= 2023 Livingstone Blue Bears football team =

American college football season

2023 Livingstone Blue Bears football
- Conference: Central Intercollegiate Athletic Association
- Southern Division
- Record: 4–6 (4–4 CIAA)
- Head coach: Sean Gilbert (2nd season)
- Offensive coordinator: Christian LaMay
- Defensive coordinator: Michael Austin
- Co-defensive coordinator: Mark Williams
- Home stadium: Alumni Memorial Stadium

2023 Central Intercollegiate Athletic Association football standings
| | Conf. | | | Overall |
| Team | W | | L | W | | L |
|---|---|---|---|---|---|---|
Northern Division
| No. 20 Virginia Union xy$^ | 7 | – | 1 | 10 | – | 2 |
| Virginia State | 6 | – | 2 | 8 | – | 2 |
| Bowie State | 5 | – | 3 | 6 | – | 4 |
| Lincoln (PA) | 3 | – | 5 | 4 | – | 6 |
| Elizabeth City State | 2 | – | 6 | 3 | – | 7 |
| Bluefield State | 0 | – | 8 | 1 | – | 9 |
Southern Division
| Fayetteville State xy | 8 | – | 0 | 8 | – | 3 |
| Johnson C. Smith # | 6 | – | 2 | 7 | – | 4 |
| Livingstone | 4 | – | 4 | 4 | – | 6 |
| Winston-Salem State | 4 | – | 4 | 4 | – | 6 |
| Shaw | 3 | – | 5 | 3 | – | 7 |
| St. Augustine's | 0 | – | 8 | 0 | – | 10 |
Championship: Virginia Union 21, Fayetteville State 10
$ – Conference champion; x – Division champion/co-champions; y – Championship game participant; ^ – NCAA Division II playoff participant; Rankings from AFCA poll

The 2023 Livingstone Blue Bears football team was an American football team that represented Livingstone College as a member of the Southern Division of the Central Intercollegiate Athletic Association (CIAA) during the 2023 NCAA Division II football season. In their second year under head coach Sean Gilbert, the Blue Bears compiled a 4–6 record (4–4 in CIAA games) and tied for third place in the CIAA's Southern Division. They were expected to finish in 11th place in the CIAA, but won consecutive upset victories over Bowie State and Winston-Salem State.

The team's statistical leaders included Marcus Drish with 960 passing yards, Matthew Henry with 650 receiving yards, JyMikah Wells with 254 rushing yards, Devontay Deloatch and Matthew Henry with 36 points each, and Jaden Echols with 80 total tackles. Henry gave himself the nickname "Mr. Waffle House" for being "always open".

Livingstone played home games at Alumni Memorial Stadium in Salisbury, North Carolina.

== Schedule ==
| Date | Time | Opponent | Site | Result | Attendance | Source |
|---|---|---|---|---|---|---|
| September 2 | 6:00 p.m. | Bluefield State* | Alumni Memorial Stadium; Salisbury, NC | L 7–41 | 3,287 | |
| September 9 | 6:00 p.m. | at Catawba* | Shuford Stadium; Salisbury, NC | L 15–55 | 3,374 | |
| September 16 | 6:00 p.m. | No. 17 Virginia Union | Alumni Memorial Stadium; Salisbury, NC | L 20–28 | 1,250 | |
| September 23 | 6:00 p.m. | at Virginia State | Rogers Stadium; Petersburg, VA | L 0–33 | 38 | |
| September 30 | 4:00 p.m. | Bowie State | Alumni Memorial Stadium; Salisbury, NC | W 31–18 | 2,753 | |
| October 7 | 1:00 p.m. | at Winston-Salem State | Bowman Gray Stadium; Winston-Salem, NC | W 23–21 | 1,202 | |
| October 14 | 2:00 p.m. | at Fayetteville State | Luther "Nick" Jeralds Stadium; Fayetteville, NC | L 14–19 | 1,835 | |
| October 21 | 1:30 p.m. | Shaw^{†} | Alumni Memorial Stadium; Salisbury, NC | W 27–26 | 4,501 | |
| October 28 | 4:00 p.m. | St. Augustine's | Alumni Memorial Stadium; Salisbury, NC | W 34–14 | 1,092 | |
| November 4 | 1:00 p.m. | Johnson C. Smith | Irwin Belk Complex; Charlotte, NC | L 17–38 | 3,333 | |
*Non-conference game; ^{†}Homecoming; Rankings from AFCA Poll released prior to the game; All times are in Eastern time

== Game summaries ==
=== Virginia Union ===
Game Three – Livingstone Blue Bears (0–2) vs Virginia Union Panthers (2–0)

| Quarter | 1 | 2 | 3 | 4 | Total |
|---|---|---|---|---|---|
| Virginia Union | 0 | 21 | 7 | 0 | 28 |
| Livingstone | 13 | 0 | 7 | 0 | 20 |

at Alumni Memorial Stadium • Salisbury, North Carolina

- Date: Sunday, September 16, 2023
- Game time: 6:00 P.M. EST
- Game attendance: 1,250
- Referee: A. Randolph
- Box score

Game information

First quarter

- (3:45) LIV – Angel Carrillo 79-yard pass from Brenton Hilton, Tyler Priddy kick failed (Drive: 4 plays, 89 yards, 1:38; Livingstone 0–6)
- (1:23) LIV – Matthew Henerey 25-yard pass from Brenton Hilton, Jason Zapata kick (Drive: 3 plays, 27 yards, 1:37; Livingstone 0–13)

Second quarter

- (11:39) VUU – Rashard Jackson 9-yard run, Brady Myers kick (Drive: 11 plays, 75 yards, 4:44; Livingstone 7–13)
- (5:15) VUU – Rashard Jackson 1-yard run, Brady Myers kick (Drive: 9 plays, 80 yards, 4:27; Virginia Union 14–13)
- (1:31) VUU – Curis Allen 3-yard run, Brady Myers kick (Drive: 3 plays, 46 yards, 1:08; Virginia Union 21–13)

Third quarter

- (8:29) VUU – RJ Rosales 25-yard run, Brady Myers kick (Drive: 2 plays, 11 yards, 0:39; Virginia Union 28–13)
- (6:20) LIV – Matthew Henerey 42-yard pass from Brenton Hilton, Jason Zapata kick (Drive: 5 plays, 54 yards, 2:02; Virginia Union 28–20)

Fourth quarter

No scoring

| Statistics | VUU | LIV |
|---|---|---|
| First downs | 20 | 12 |
| Plays–yards | 393 | 332 |
| Rushes–yards | 320 | 313 |
| Passing yards | 73 | 19 |
| Passing: comp–att–int | 5–9–2 | 18–29–4 |
| Turnovers | | |
| Time of possession | 33:47 | 26:13 |

| Team | Category | Player | Statistics |
|---|---|---|---|
| Virginia Union | Passing | Christian Reid | 5/8, 73 yards, 2 INTs |
| Virginia Union | Rushing | Rashard Jackson | 32 carries, 185 yards, 2 TDs |
| Virginia Union | Receiving | Said Sadibe | 2 receptions, 50 yards |
| Livingstone | Passing | Brenton Hilton | 17/26, 314 yards, 3 TDs, 4 INTs |
| Livingstone | Rushing | JyMikaah Wells | 11 carries, 14 yards |
| Livingstone | Receiving | Angelo Carrillo | 5 receptions, 147 yards, 1 TD |

== Coaching staff ==
| Name | Position |
|---|---|
| Sean Gilbert | Head coach |
| Michael Austin | Assistant head coach Defensive coordinator |
| Mark Williams | Associate head coach Co–Defensive coordinator Recruiting coordinator Defensive line coach |
| Troy Veale | Defensive special assistant |
| Christian LaMay | Offensive coordinator Quarterbacks coach |
| J. C. McDonald | Offensive special assistant |
| Ebony Kimbrough | Special teams coordinator Running backs coach |
| Marcelo Cavers | Wide receivers coach |
| Robert Sherrod | Offensive line coach |
| Markeem Bell | Graduate assistant Assistant linebackers coach |
| Otis Powell | Defensive backs coach |
