= Alvin Parker =

American football coach (born c. 1977)

Current position
- Title: Head coach
- Team: Virginia Union
- Conference: CIAA
- Record: 59–20

Biographical details
- Born: c. 1977 (age 48–49); Washington, D.C., U.S.
- Education: Virginia Union University (1999); Virginia Commonwealth University (2001); Northcentral University (2017)

Playing career
- 1995–1998: Virginia Union
- Position: Running back

Coaching career (HC unless noted)
- 1999–2000: Virginia Union (OA)
- 2001–2002: Virginia Union (RB)
- 2003: Virginia Union (OC/RB)
- 2004–2015: Elizabeth City State (AHC/OC)
- 2016–2017: St. Augustine's (AHC/OC)
- 2018–present: Virginia Union

Administrative career (AD unless noted)
- 2021–present: Virginia Union (associate AD)

Head coaching record
- Overall: 59–20
- Tournaments: 2–4 (NCAA D-II playoffs)

Accomplishments and honors

Championships
- 2 CIAA (2023–2024); 1 CIAA Northern Division (2023)

Awards
- CIAA Coach of the Year (2023)

Alvin D. Parker (born c. 1977) is an American college football coach. He is the head football coach for Virginia Union University, a position he has held since 2018. He also coached for Elizabeth City State and St. Augustine's. He played college football for Virginia Union as a running back.

== Head coaching record ==
| Year | Team | Overall | Conference | Standing | Bowl/playoffs | AFCA^{#} | D2^{°} |
|---|---|---|---|---|---|---|---|
Virginia Union Panthers (Central Intercollegiate Athletic Association) (2018–present)
| 2018 | Virginia Union | 8–2 | 5–1 | 2nd (Northern) | | | |
| 2019 | Virginia Union | 7–3 | 5–2 | 3rd (Northern) | | | |
| 2020–21 | No team—COVID-19 | | | | | | |
| 2021 | Virginia Union | 6–4 | 5–2 | 2nd (Northern) | | | |
| 2022 | Virginia Union | 9–2 | 7–1 | 2nd (Northern) | L NCAA Division II First Round | 18 | |
| 2023 | Virginia Union | 10–2 | 7–1 | 1st (Northern) | L NCAA Division II First Round | 20 | 24 |
| 2024 | Virginia Union | 10–4 | 7–1 | 1st | L NCAA Division II Quarterfinal | 11 | 12 |
| 2025 | Virginia Union | 9–3 | 7–1 | 2nd | L NCAA Division II First Round | 21 | |
| Virginia Union: | | 59–20 | 42–9 | | | | |
| Total: | | 59–20 | | | | | |
National championship Conference title Conference division title or championship game berth
