= 2023 Virginia Union Panthers football team =

American college football season

2023 Virginia Union Panthers football

CIAA champion

NCAA Division II First Round, L 14–38 vs. Kutztown
- Conference: Central Intercollegiate Athletic Association

Ranking
- AFCA: No. 20
- Record: 10–2 (7–1 CIAA)
- Head coach: Alvin Parker (5th season)
- Offensive coordinator: Luke Bengtson (1st season)
- Defensive coordinator: Edward Pointer (5th season)
- Home stadium: Hovey Field

2023 Central Intercollegiate Athletic Association football standings
	Conf.			Overall
Team	W		L	W		L
Northern Division
No. 20 Virginia Union xy$^	7	–	1	10	–	2
Virginia State	6	–	2	8	–	2
Bowie State	5	–	3	6	–	4
Lincoln (PA)	3	–	5	4	–	6
Elizabeth City State	2	–	6	3	–	7
Bluefield State	0	–	8	1	–	9
Southern Division
Fayetteville State xy	8	–	0	8	–	3
Johnson C. Smith #	6	–	2	7	–	4
Livingstone	4	–	4	4	–	6
Winston-Salem State	4	–	4	4	–	6
Shaw	3	–	5	3	–	7
St. Augustine's	0	–	8	0	–	10
Championship: Virginia Union 21, Fayetteville State 10
$ – Conference champion; x – Division champion/co-champions; y – Championship game participant; ^ – NCAA Division II playoff participant; Rankings from AFCA poll

The 2023 Virginia Union Panthers football team represented Virginia Union University as a member of the Central Intercollegiate Athletic Association (CIAA) during the 2023 NCAA Division II football season. Led by 5th-year head coach Alvin Parker, the Panthers compiled an overall record of 10–2 with a mark of 7–1 in conference play; winning the CIAA championship.

Virginia Union lost to Kutztown in the first round of the playoffs for back-to-back first round losses and the programs' twelfth consecutive loss in the playoffs with no playoff wins.

== Offseason ==
Positions key
Offense	Defense	Special teams
QB — Quarterback; RB — Running back; FB — Fullback; WR — Wide receiver; TE — Tight end; OL — Offensive lineman; T — Tackle; G — Guard; C — Center	DL — Defensive lineman; DT — Defensive tackle (Note: Includes nose tackle (NT)); DE — Defensive end; EDGE — Edge rusher; LB — Linebacker (Note: Includes middle linebacker (MLB/MIKE), weakside linebacker (WILL), strongside linebacker (SAM), off-ball linebacker, and outside linebacker (OLB)); DB — Defensive back; CB — Cornerback; S — Safety (Note: Includes free safety (FS) and strong safety (SS))	K — Kicker (Note: Also known as a placekicker (PK)); P — Punter; LS — Long snapper; RS — Return specialist (Note: Includes kickoff and punt returners)

=== Team departures ===
2023 Virginia Union offseason departures
Name	Number	Pos.	Height, Weight	Year	Hometown	Notes
John Jiles	#0	WR	6'3, 190	Junior	Wake Forest, NC	Elected to transfer to West Florida
Jahkari Grant	#1	QB	6'1, 190	Graduate	Windsor, CT	Graduated/declared for 2023 NFL draft
Alvin Howard	#4	WR	6'0, 175	Junior	Key West, FL	Elected to transfer to Concord
Devin Sanders	#4	DE	6'1, 220	Junior	Seat Pleasant, MD	N/A
James Jackson	#5	WR	6'1, 170	Senior	Richmond, VA	Graduated
Damontay Rhem	#6	LB	6'0, 225	Graduate	Wendell, NC	Graduated/declared for 2023 NFL draft
Demetrius Mann	#7	S	5'9, 180	Graduate	Tampa, FL	Graduated
Kyron McKinnie-Harper	#8	CB	6'1, 190	Sophomore	Detroit, MI	N/A
Xzavier Hines	#9	DE	6'4, 235	Senior	Lanham, MD	Graduated
Zion Edwards	#15	S	6'0, 180	Junior	Palm Beach, FL	N/A
K'Jon Coley	#19	CB	6'0, 180	Graduate	Richmond, VA	Graduated
Joseph J. Johnson	#24	WR	5'6, 175	Sophomore	Forestville, MD	N/A
Dev'on Grant	#28	LB	6'1, 210	Junior	Wake Forest, NC	Elected to transfer to Elizabeth City State
Shamore Collins	#33	LB	6'0, 220	Sophomore	Millville, NJ	N/A
Donovan Owens	#34	S	6'0, 185	Freshman	Chesapeake, VA	N/A
Mingo Peterson	#37	DB	5'11, 175	Graduate	Arlington, VA	Graduated
Wali-Shahad Sabree	#38	LB	6'4, 210	Senior	Chester, PA	Graduated
R. J. Rountree	#39	S	6'0, 185	Graduate	Silver Spring, MD	Graduated/declared for 2023 NFL draft
Vince Willis	#40	LB	5'11, 195	Sophomore	Los Angeles, CA	N/A
Xavier Wilson	#41	CB	5'10, 170	Freshman	Richmond, VA	N/A
Malique Miller	#45	LB	6'1, 215	Sophomore	Washington, DC	N/A
Andrew Kibler	#47	K/P	6'1, 220	Graduate	Cape Coral, FL	Graduated
Kole Williams	#52	LB	6'0, 215	Sophomore	Suffolk, VA	N/A
Christian Solomon	#54	OL	6'3, 285	Freshman	Hammonton, NJ	N/A
Brian Gibson	#57	OL	6'4, 285	(redshirt) Senior	Baltimore, MD	Graduated
Justin Meade	#58	OL	6'2, 275	Senior	Richmond, VA	Graduated
Demetrie Massey	#73	OL	6'3, 275	(redshirt) Senior	Miami, FL	Graduated
Darian Bryant	#76	OL	6’6, 320	Graduate	Philadelphia, PA	Graduated/declared for 2023 NFL draft
Ahmad Holloway	#85	TE	6'2, 230	Junior	Richmond, VA	N/A
Dwayne Chandler	#89	TE	6'5, 225	(redshirt) Freshman	Manassas, VA	Elected to transfer to Old Dominion
Keenan Evans	#90	DL	6'3, 285	Senior	Raleigh, NC	Graduated/declared for 2023 NFL draft

=== Transfer portal ===
==== Outgoing transfers ====
Four Virginia Union Panthers players left via the NCAA transfer portal during or after the 2022 season.

Virginia Union outgoing transfers
Name	No.	Pos.	Height/Weight	Year	Hometown	College transferred to	Sources
John Jiles	#0	WR	6'3, 190	Junior	Wake Forest, NC	West Florida	
Alvin Howard	#4	WR	6'0, 175	Junior	Key West, FL	Concord	
Dev'on Grant	#28	LB	6'1, 210	Junior	Wake Forest, NC	Elizabeth City State	
Dwayne Chandler	#89	TE	6'5, 225	(redshirt) Freshman	Manassas, VA	Old Dominion	

==== Incoming transfers ====
Over the off-season, Virginia Union added seventeen players via the transfer portal.

Virginia Union incoming transfers
Name	No.	Pos.	Height/Weight	Year	Hometown	Previous school	Sources
Nehemiah Scott	#1	S	6'1, 175	Sophomore	Richmond, VA	Emory and Henry	
J'Bore' Gibbs	#4	QB	6'3, 225	Graduate	Chicago, IL	Idaho	
Navarro Price	#12	QB	6'1, 195	(redshirt) Junior	Hampton, VA	Elizabeth City State	
Kory Fleming	#15	TE	6'3, 230	Graduate	Clarksburg, MD	Morehouse	
Nahsir Morgan Sr.	#16	WR	6'5, 190	Junior	Atlantic City, NJ	Delaware Valley	
David Freeman	#21	RB	5'10, 195	Senior	Baltimore, MD	Hartnell College	
Elijah Rice	#23	WR	5'9, 185	Senior	Williamsburg, VA	Emory and Henry	
Xzavier Barnes	#25	CB	6'0, 185	(redshirt) Sophomore	Kilmarnock, VA	Virginia–Wise	
Decari Randle	#33	LB	6'1, 230	(redshirt) Junior	Chicago, IL	Iowa Central CC	
Kyle Kidewell	#37	S	6'3, 195	(redshirt) Sophomore	Bowie, MD	Atlanta Tech	
Jabrill Norman	#44	LB	6'2, 220	Junior	Salisbury, NC	Mars Hill	
Jerry Newmy	#46	FB	6'0, 245	(redshirt) Freshman	Chester, VA	Chowan	
Jahmel Flowers	#48	DE	6'5, 215	(redshirt) Junior	Atlanta, GA	Arkansas–Monticello	
Josue Hernandez	#50	K/P	6'1, 180	Junior	Middlesex, NJ	Keystone	
Dillon Porter	#70	OL	6'5, 285	Sophomore	Pulaski, VA	Virginia–Lynchburg	
Tajhir Tate	#99	DL	6'1, 300	Graduate	Elizabeth, NJ	Wagner	
Corie Addo		WR	5'10, 195	(redshirt) Sophomore	Richmond, VA	Norfolk State	

=== Recruiting class ===
Virginia Union signed 26 players in the class of 2023.

College recruiting
Name	Hometown	School	Height	Weight	Commit date
Jonathan Derricott; QB	Richmond, VA	Varina High School	6 ft 3 in (1.91 m)	175 lb (79 kg)	
Jonathan Derricott; QB	Recruit ratings: No ratings found				
Tayvon Tyler; QB	Newport News, VA	Woodside High School	6 ft 4 in (1.93 m)	185 lb (84 kg)	Feb 15, 2023
Tayvon Tyler; QB	Recruit ratings: No ratings found				
Jayden Earley; CB	Hampton, VA	Phoebus High School	6 ft 2 in (1.88 m)	190 lb (86 kg)	Jan 28, 2023
Jayden Earley; CB	Recruit ratings: No ratings found				
Roberto Alvarez Jr. RB	Temple Hills, MD	St. Thomas More School	5 ft 9 in (1.75 m)	180 lb (82 kg)	
Roberto Alvarez Jr. RB	Recruit ratings: No ratings found				
Aarenamon Johnson; CB	Richmond, VA	Glen Allen High School	6 ft 2 in (1.88 m)	180 lb (82 kg)	Mar 24, 2023
Aarenamon Johnson; CB	Recruit ratings: No ratings found				
Damon Etheridge; S	Chesapeake, VA	Oscar F. Smith High School	6 ft 0 in (1.83 m)	190 lb (86 kg)	
Damon Etheridge; S	Recruit ratings: No ratings found				
Jayden White; CB	Emporia, VA	Southampton High School	5 ft 11 in (1.80 m)	190 lb (86 kg)	
Jayden White; CB	Recruit ratings: No ratings found				
Damari Mason; S	Richmond, VA	Hermitage High School	6 ft 2 in (1.88 m)	170 lb (77 kg)	Feb 27, 2023
Damari Mason; S	Recruit ratings: No ratings found				
Brandan Cammarasana; LB	Chester, VA	Thomas Dale High School	6 ft 2 in (1.88 m)	225 lb (102 kg)	Jan 1, 2023
Brandan Cammarasana; LB	Recruit ratings: No ratings found				
Nathaniel Knox; S	Norfolk, VA	Matthew Fontaine Maury High School	6 ft 0 in (1.83 m)	190 lb (86 kg)	
Nathaniel Knox; S	Recruit ratings: No ratings found				
Alexandre Lafontant; LS	Orlando, FL	Cypress Creek High School	5 ft 10 in (1.78 m)	185 lb (84 kg)	
Alexandre Lafontant; LS	Recruit ratings: No ratings found				
Adrian Crespin; OL	Woodbridge, VA	Freedom High School	6 ft 3 in (1.91 m)	285 lb (129 kg)	Feb 1, 2023
Adrian Crespin; OL	Recruit ratings: No ratings found				
Diamondz Wells; LB	Norfolk, VA	Booker T. Washington High School	5 ft 11 in (1.80 m)	215 lb (98 kg)	Feb 1, 2023
Diamondz Wells; LB	Recruit ratings: No ratings found				
Mathias Nielson; OL	Gentofte, Denmark	Gentofte Skole	6 ft 5 in (1.96 m)	295 lb (134 kg)	
Mathias Nielson; OL	Recruit ratings: No ratings found				
Isaiah Butcher; OL	Glen Allen, VA	Glen Allen High School	6 ft 2 in (1.88 m)	310 lb (140 kg)	
Isaiah Butcher; OL	Recruit ratings: No ratings found				
Justin Royes; OL	Suffolk, VA	Lakeland High School	6 ft 5 in (1.96 m)	310 lb (140 kg)	Feb 7, 2023
Justin Royes; OL	Recruit ratings: No ratings found				
Isaiah Whitehurst; OL	Norfolk, VA	Matthew Fontaine Maury High School	6 ft 0 in (1.83 m)	270 lb (120 kg)	
Isaiah Whitehurst; OL	Recruit ratings: No ratings found				
Trai'von Callis; OL	Brunswick, VA	Brunswick High School	6 ft 8 in (2.03 m)	330 lb (150 kg)	
Trai'von Callis; OL	Recruit ratings: No ratings found				
Shawn Battle II; OL	Franklin, VA	Franklin High School	6 ft 2 in (1.88 m)	315 lb (143 kg)	
Shawn Battle II; OL	Recruit ratings: No ratings found				
Isaiah Wallace; WR	Newport News, VA	Warwick High School	5 ft 11 in (1.80 m)	175 lb (79 kg)	
Isaiah Wallace; WR	Recruit ratings: No ratings found				
Juelz Cooper; TE	Courtland, VA	Southampton High School	6 ft 2 in (1.88 m)	230 lb (100 kg)	
Juelz Cooper; TE	Recruit ratings: No ratings found				
Samuel Arrey; DL	Lanham, MD	DuVal High School	6 ft 2 in (1.88 m)	290 lb (130 kg)	
Samuel Arrey; DL	Recruit ratings: No ratings found				
Kamari Federick; DL	Pompano Beach, FL	Blanche Ely High School	5 ft 11 in (1.80 m)	280 lb (130 kg)	
Kamari Federick; DL	Recruit ratings: No ratings found				
Jordan Kamara; DL	Baltimore, MD	Seneca Valley High School	6 ft 3 in (1.91 m)	230 lb (100 kg)	Jan 14, 2023
Jordan Kamara; DL	Recruit ratings: No ratings found				
Lyvarius Gilbert; WR	Lynchburg, VA	E. C. Glass High School	6 ft 0 in (1.83 m)	185 lb (84 kg)	
Lyvarius Gilbert; WR	Recruit ratings: No ratings found				
Sean Macon; CB	Richmond, VA	Henrico High School	6 ft 0 in (1.83 m)	165 lb (75 kg)	Feb 2, 2023
Sean Macon; CB	Recruit ratings: No ratings found				
Overall recruit ranking:
‡ Refers to 40-yard dash; Note: In many cases, Scout, Rivals, 247Sports, On3, and ESPN may conflict in their listings of height, weight and 40 time.; In these cases, the average was taken. ESPN grades are on a 100-point scale.; Sources: "2023 Team Ranking". Rivals.com.

=== CIAA media day ===
The 2023 CIAA Media day were held at 9:30 a.m. on July 20, 2023. Each team had their head coach available to talk to the media at the event.

Predicted Order of finish
Rank	Team
1	Fayetteville State
2	Bowie State
3	Virginia Union
4	Shaw
5	Virginia State
6	Johnson C. Smith
7	Winston-Salem State
8	Elizabeth City State
9	Bluefield State
10	Lincoln (PA)
11	Livinstone
12	St. Augustine's

Predicted Order of finish (Northern)
Rank	Team
1	Bowie State
2	Virginia Union
3	Virginia State
4	Elizabeth City State
5	Bluefield State
6	Lincoln (PA)

Predicted Order of finish (Southern)
Rank	Team
1	Fayetteville State
2	Shaw
3	Johnson C. Smith
4	Winston-Salem State
5	Livingstone
6	St. Augustine's

=== Preseason All-CIAA teams ===
Position	Player	Class	Team
Offense
RB	Jada Byers	Jr	Virginia Union
TE	Kalen Carver	Redshirt Jr	Virginia Union
OL	Justin Meade	Sr	Virginia Union
Defense
DL	Isaac Anderson	Redshirt Jr	Virginia Union
DL	Armonii Burden	Gr	Virginia Union
LB	Shamar Graham	Redshirt So	Virginia Union
Special teams
PK	Brady Myers	So	Virginia Union
KR	Larry Hackey	Jr	Virginia Union

== Schedule ==
Date	Time	Opponent	Rank	Site	TV	Result	Attendance	Source
September 3	4:00 p.m.	vs. Morehouse*	No. 18	Tom Benson Hall of Fame Stadium; Canton, OH (Black College HOF Classic)	NFL Network	W 45–13	9,333	
September 9	1:00 p.m.	at Shaw*	No. 17	Durham County Memorial Stadium; Durham, NC		W 26–13	1,863	
September 16	1:00 p.m.	at Livingstone	No. 17	Alumni Memorial Stadium; Salisbury, NC		W 28–20	1,250	
September 23	6:00 p.m.	Fayetteville State	No. 15	Hovey Field; Richmond, VA		L 7–10	671	
September 30	1:00 p.m.	at St. Augustine's		John H. Baker Stadium; Raleigh, NC		W 47–7	513	
October 7	1:00 p.m.	at Elizabeth City State		Roebuck Stadium; Elizabeth City, NC		W 42–20	925	
October 14	1:00 p.m.	Bowie State		Hovey Field; Richmond, VA		W 52–3	610	
October 21	1:00 p.m.	Lincoln (PA)^{†}		Hovey Field; Richmond, VA		W 57–0	5,250	
October 28	1:00 p.m.	at Bluefield State	No. 23	Mitchell Stadium; Bluefield, WV		W 57–12	283	
November 4	1:00 p.m.	No. 22 Virginia State	No. 19	Hovey Field; Richmond, VA		W 30–20	15,000	
November 11	3:00 p.m.	vs. Fayetteville State*	No. 18	Salem Civic Center; Salem, VA (CIAA Championship Game)		W 21–10		
November 18	12:00 p.m.	at No. 7 Kutztown*	No. 13	Andre Reed Stadium; Kutztown, PA (NCAA Division II First Round)		L 14–38	1,470	
*Non-conference game; ^{†}Homecoming; Rankings from AFCA Poll released prior to the game; All times are in Eastern Standard time

== Game summaries ==
=== Vs. Morehouse (Black College Football HOF Classic) ===
Game One – No. 18 Virginia Union Panthers (0–0) vs Morehouse Maroon Tigers (0–0)

Quarter	1	2	3	4	Total
Morehouse	0	0	7	6	13
No. 18 Virginia Union	7	7	7	24	45

at Tom Benson Hall of Fame Stadium • Canton, Ohio

- Date: Sunday, September 3, 2023
- Game time: 4:00 P.M. EST
- Game weather: Temperature: 86 °F (30 °C) • Weather: Sunny, humid
- Game attendance: 9,333
- Referee: Larry Smith
- TV: NFL Network
- Recap, box score

Game information

First quarter

- (9:52) VUU – Jada Byers 29-yard run, Brady Myers kick (Drive: 10 plays, 84 yards, 5:08; Virginia Union 7–0)

Second quarter

- (6:46) VUU – Jabrill Norman 68-yard interception, Brady Myers kick (Virginia Union 14–0)

Third quarter

- (8:53) MORE – Delvin Olawumi Jr. 10-yard blocked punt return, Danny Elrod kick (Virginia Union 14–7)
- (1:29) VUU – Jada Byers 24-yard run, Brady Myers kick (Drive: 6 plays, 78 yards, 1:57; Virginia Union 21–7)

Fourth quarter

- (14:56) VUU – Jada Byers 21-yard run, Brady Myers kick (Drive: 2 plays, 39 yards, 0:20; Virginia Union 28–7)
- (12:08) VUU – Joe Johnson 21-yard pass from Christian Reid, Brady Myers kick (Drive: 3 plays, 47 yards, 1:41; Virginia Union 35–7)
- (8:26) VUU – RJ Rosales 12-yard run, Brady Myers kick (Drive: 4 plays, 46 yards, 2:10; Virginia Union 42–7)
- (6:03) MORE – Brogan Korta 31-yard pass from Jaylon West, Danny Elrod kick blocked (Drive: 4 plays, 57 yards, 2:12; Virginia Union 42–13)
- (0:36) VUU – Brady Myers 27-yard field goal (Drive: 9 plays, 88 yards, 5:20; Virginia Union 45–13)

Statistics	MORE	VUU
First downs	15	21
Plays–yards	230	440
Rushes–yards	72	230
Passing yards	158	210
Passing: comp–att–int	14–32–1	13–19–0
Time of possession	29:26	30:34

Team	Category	Player	Statistics
Morehouse	Passing	Derrach West	13/30, 127 yards, 1 INT
Morehouse	Rushing	Zion Bioue	12 carries, 28 yards
Morehouse	Receiving	Brogan Korta	2 receptions, 45 yards, 1 TD
Virginia Union	Passing	Christian Reid	11/15, 153 yards, 1 TD
Virginia Union	Rushing	Jada Byers	24 carries, 147 yards, 3 TDs
Virginia Union	Receiving	Kalen Carver	3 receptions, 61 yards

On January 13, 2023, Virginia Union was picked to play against fellow HBCU Morehouse in the fourth-annual Black College Football Hall of Fame Classic. Virginia Union came into the game looking to build upon the previous seasons success as they finished with a 9–2 record and made an appearance in the NCAA Division II playoffs under head coach Alvin Parker. Morehouse came into the season with first-year head coach Gerard Wilcher as the team looked to improve following a 1–9 season with former head coach Rich Freeman at the helm.

Virginia Union beat Morehouse while running back Jada Byers scored three touchdowns and the Panther defense held the Maroon Tigers to less than 250 total-yards of offense throughout the entire game.

=== At Shaw ===
Game Two – No. 17 Virginia Union Panthers (1–0) vs Shaw Bears (0–1)

Quarter	1	2	3	4	Total
No. 17 Virginia Union	16	0	10	0	26
Shaw	0	6	7	0	13

at Durham County Memorial Stadium • Durham, North Carolina

- Date: Saturday, September 9, 2023
- Game time: 3:30 P.M. EST
- Game weather: Temperature: 70 °F (21 °C) • Weather: Rainy, cloudy
- Game attendance: 1,863
- Referee: Richard Caldwell
- Recap, box score

Game information

First quarter

- (9:16) VUU – Jada Byers 1-yard run, Brady Myers kick (Drive: 6 plays, 48 yards, 2:55; Virginia Union 7–0)
- (9:09) VUU – Team safety (Virginia Union 9–0)
- (4:29) VUU – Said Sidibe 41-yard pass from Christian Reid, Brady Myers kick (Drive: 6 plays, 65 yards, 4:40; Virginia Union 16–0)

Second quarter

- (2:28) SHAW – Donte Lee Jr. 85-yard pass from Silas Cruise, Silas Cruse two-point pass failed (Drive: 2 plays, 90 yards, 0:39; Virginia Union 16–6)

Third quarter

- (6:54) VUU – Brady Myers 29-yard field goal (Drive: 7 plays, 19 yards, 2:24; Virginia Union 19–6)
- (6:41) SU – Donte Lee Jr. 98-yard kickoff return, Dev Vesteegen kick (Virginia Union 19–13)
- (0:28) VUU – William Davis 50-yard interception, Brady Myers kick (Virginia Union 26–13)

Fourth quarter

No scoring

Statistics	VUU	SHAW
First downs	21	10
Plays–yards	401	217
Rushes–yards	136	14
Passing yards	265	203
Passing: comp–att–int	24–37–1	15–31–2
Time of possession	37:25	20:01

Team	Category	Player	Statistics
Virginia Union	Passing	Christian Reid	21/32, 232 yards, 1 TD
Virginia Union	Rushing	Curtis Allen	8 carries, 53 yards
Virginia Union	Receiving	Said Sidibe	6 receptions, 91 yards, 1 TD
Shaw	Passing	Silas Cruse	15/31, 203 yards, 1 TD, 2 INTs
Shaw	Rushing	Sidney Gibbs	12 carries, 24 yards
Shaw	Receiving	Donte Lee Jr.	2 receptions, 84 yards, 1 TD

=== At Livingstone ===
Game Three – No. 17 Virginia Union Panthers (2–0) vs Livingstone Blue Bears (0–2)

Quarter	1	2	3	4	Total
No. 17 Virginia Union	0	21	7	0	28
Livingstone	13	0	7	0	20

at Alumni Memorial Stadium • Salisbury, North Carolina

- Date: Saturday, September 16, 2023
- Game time: 6:00 P.M. EST
- Game attendance: 1,250
- Referee: A. Randolph
- Recap, box score

Game information

First quarter

- (3:45) LIV – Angel Carrillo 79-yard pass from Brenton Hilton, Tyler Priddy kick failed (Drive: 4 plays, 89 yards, 1:38; Livingstone 0–6)
- (1:23) LIV – Matthew Henerey 25-yard pass from Brenton Hilton, Jason Zapata kick (Drive: 3 plays, 27 yards, 1:37; Livingstone 0–13)

Second quarter

- (11:39) VUU – Rashard Jackson 9-yard run, Brady Myers kick (Drive: 11 plays, 75 yards, 4:44; Livingstone 7–13)
- (5:15) VUU – Rashard Jackson 1-yard run, Brady Myers kick (Drive: 9 plays, 80 yards, 4:27; Virginia Union 14–13)
- (1:31) VUU – Curis Allen 3-yard run, Brady Myers kick (Drive: 3 plays, 46 yards, 1:08; Virginia Union 21–13)

Third quarter

- (8:29) VUU – RJ Rosales 25-yard run, Brady Myers kick (Drive: 2 plays, 11 yards, 0:39; Virginia Union 28–13)
- (6:20) LIV – Matthew Henerey 42-yard pass from Brenton Hilton, Jason Zapata kick (Drive: 5 plays, 54 yards, 2:02; Virginia Union 28–20)

Fourth quarter

No scoring

Statistics	VUU	LIV
First downs	20	12
Plays–yards	393	332
Rushes–yards	320	313
Passing yards	73	19
Passing: comp–att–int	5–9–2	18–29–4
Time of possession	33:47	26:13

Team	Category	Player	Statistics
Virginia Union	Passing	Christian Reid	5/8, 73 yards, 2 INTs
Virginia Union	Rushing	Rashard Jackson	32 carries, 185 yards, 2 TDs
Virginia Union	Receiving	Said Sadibe	2 receptions, 50 yards
Livingstone	Passing	Brenton Hilton	17/26, 314 yards, 3 TDs, 4 INTs
Livingstone	Rushing	JyMikaah Wells	11 carries, 14 yards
Livingstone	Receiving	Angelo Carrillo	5 receptions, 147 yards, 1 TD

=== Fayetteville State ===
Game Four – No. 15 Virginia Union Panthers (3–0) vs Fayetteville State Broncos (1–2)

Quarter	1	2	3	4	Total
Fayetteville State	7	0	0	3	10
No. 15 Virginia Union	0	7	0	0	7

at Hovey Field • Richmond, Virginia

- Date: Saturday, September 23, 2023
- Game time: 6:00 P.M. EST
- Game weather: Temperature: 66 °F (19 °C) • Weather: Rain
- Game attendance: 671
- Referee: John Holmes
- Recap, box score

Game information

First quarter

- (4:15) FSU – Christian Powell 4-yard pass from Caden Davis, Jacob Meneses kick (Drive: 4 plays, 2 yards, 1:48; Fayetteville State 7–0)

Second quarter

- (11:42) VUU – Kalen Carver 9-yard pass from Christian Reid, Brady Myers kick (Drive: 1 plays, 9 yards, 0:07; Tied 7–7)

Third quarter

No scoring

Fourth quarter

- (0:06) FSU – Jacob Meneses 27-yard field goal (Drive: 9 plays, 28 yards, 4:14; Fayetteville State 10–7)

Statistics	FSU	VUU
First downs	6	12
Plays–yards	92	184
Rushes–yards	41	164
Passing yards	51	20
Passing: comp–att–int	7–13–0	3–6–0
Time of possession	28:27	31:33

Team	Category	Player	Statistics
Fayetteville State	Passing	Joe Owens	6/12, 47 yards
Fayetteville State	Rushing	Julian Milligan	14 carries, 34 yards
Fayetteville State	Receiving	Julian Milligan	4 receptions, 34 yards
Virginia Union	Passing	Christian Reid	3/6, 20 yards, 1 TD
Virginia Union	Rushing	Curtis Allen	30 carries, 155 yards
Virginia Union	Receiving	Said Sidibe	2 receptions, 11 yards

=== At St. Augustine's ===
Game Five – Virginia Union Panthers (3–1) vs St. Augustine's Falcons (0–4)

Quarter	1	2	3	4	Total
Virginia Union	0	24	14	9	47
St. Augustine's	0	0	0	7	7

at John H. Baker Stadium • Raleigh, North Carolina

- Date: Saturday, September 30, 2023
- Game time: 1:00 P.M. EST
- Game weather: Temperature: 73 °F (23 °C) • Weather: Cloudy
- Game attendance: 513
- Referee: Ryan Massey
- Recap, box score

Game information

First quarter

No scoring

Second quarter

- (12:12) VUU – Brady Myers 37-yard field goal (Drive: 4 plays, 18 yards, 0:54; Virginia Union 3–0)
- (6:25) VUU – Isaac Anderson 0-yard fumble recovery, Brady Myers kick (Virginia Union 10–0)
- (4:24) VUU – Nahsir Morgan Sr. 56-yard pass from Christian Reid, Brady Myers kick (Drive: 1 play, 56 yards, 0:11; Virginia Union 17–0)
- (1:18) VUU – Said Sidibe 15-yard pass from RJ Rosales, Brady Myers kick (Drive: 4 plays, 25 yards, 1:31; Virginia Union 24–0)

Third quarter

- (14:41) VUU – Curtis Allen 60-yard run, Brady Myers kick (Drive: 1 play, 60 yards, 0:13; Virginia Union 31–0)
- (8:24) VUU – Ricky Key Jr. 33-yard pass from RJ Rosales, Brady Myers kick (Drive: 1 play, 33 yards, 0:06; Virginia Union 38–0)

Fourth quarter

- (14:00) VUU – Curtis Allen 2-yard run, Brady Myers kick (Drive: 6 plays, 55 yards, 1:58; Virginia Union 45–0)
- (4:48) VUU – Lamumba Howard 21-yard safety (Virginia Union 47–0)
- (2:40) SAU – Booker Peake 76-yard fumble recovery, James Hobson kick (Virginia Union 47–7)

Statistics	VUU	SAU
First downs	20	8
Plays–yards	367	163
Rushes–yards	230	-24
Passing yards	137	187
Passing: comp–att–int	9–19–1	20–40–0
Time of possession	29:44	30:16

Team	Category	Player	Statistics
Virginia Union	Passing	RJ Rosales	5/9, 74 yards, 2 TDs, 1 INT
Virginia Union	Rushing	Curtis Allen	19 carries, 151 yards, 2 TDs
Virginia Union	Receiving	Nahsir Morgan Sr.	1 reception, 56 yards, 1 TD
St. Augustine's	Passing	Anthony Butler	15/31, 150 yards
St. Augustine's	Rushing	Anthony Butler	2 carries, 5 yards
St. Augustine's	Receiving	Christ Perkins	3 receptions, 70 yards

=== At Elizabeth City State ===
Game Six – Virginia Union Panthers (4–1) vs Elizabeth City State Vikings (1–4)

Quarter	1	2	3	4	Total
Virginia Union	7	7	7	21	42
Elizabeth City State	0	0	7	13	20

at Roebuck Stadium • Elizabeth City, North Carolina

- Date: Saturday, October 7, 2023
- Game time: 1:00 P.M. EST
- Game weather: Temperature: 74 °F (23 °C) • Weather: Cloudy
- Game attendance: 925
- Referee: Derek Hatten
- Recap, box score

Game information

First quarter

- (4:57) VUU – Ricky Key Jr. 24-yard pass from Christian Reid, Brady Myers kick (Drive: 7 plays, 65 yards, 3:46; Virginia Union 7–0)

Second quarter

- (5:27) VUU – Jada Byers 21-yard run, Brady Myers kick (Drive: 7 plays, 54 yards, 3:21; Virginia Union 14–0)

Third quarter

- (7:28) ECSU – Quinzel Lockhart 41-yard pass from Donoven Davenport, Carson Hancock kick (Drive: 9 plays, 80 yards, 4:27; Virginia Union 14–7)
- (2:26) VUU – Ricky Key Jr. 21-yard pass from RJ Rosales, Brady Myers kick (Drive: 3 plays, 25 yards, 1:06; Virginia Union 21–7)

Fourth quarter

- (14:50) VUU – Donald Gatling 45-yard interception, Brady Myers kick (Virginia Union 28–7)
- (13:45) ECSU – Quinzel Lockhart 95-yard pass from Donoven Davenport, Carson Hancock kick (Drive: 3 plays, 84 yards, 1:01; Virginia Union 28–14)
- (8:41) ECSU – Quinzel Lockhart 4-yard pass from Donoven Davenport (Drive: 3 plays, 15 yards, 1:16; Virginia Union 28–20)
- (7:42) VUU – Jada Byers 40-yard run, Brady Myers kick (Drive: 2 plays, 58 yards, 0:51; Virginia Union 35–20)
- (3:21) VUU – Said Sidibe 14-yard pass from Christian Reid, Brady Myers kick (Drive: 5 plays, 45 yards, 1:55; Virginia Union 42–20)

Statistics	VUU	ECSU
First downs	20	11
Plays–yards	397	311
Rushes–yards	295	10
Passing yards	102	301
Passing: comp–att–int	6–17–1	20–40–4
Time of possession	31:58	28:02

Team	Category	Player	Statistics
Virginia Union	Passing	RJ Rosales	3/7, 59 yards, 1 TD, 1 INT
Virginia Union	Rushing	Jada Byers	27 carries, 246 yards, 2 TDs
Virginia Union	Receiving	Ricky Key Jr.	3 receptions, 78 yards, 2 TDs
Elizabeth City State	Passing	Donoven Davenport	20/40, 301 yards, 3 TDs, 4 INTs
Elizabeth City State	Rushing	Ian Edwards	3 carries, 16 yards
Elizabeth City State	Receiving	Quinzel Lockhart	9 receptions, 175 yards, 3 TDs

=== Bowie State ===
Game Seven – Virginia Union Panthers (5–1) vs Bowie State Bulldogs (3–3)

Quarter	1	2	3	4	Total
Bowie State	0	3	0	0	3
Virginia Union	0	7	0	0	7

at Hovey Field • Richmond, Virginia

- Date: Saturday, October 14, 2023
- Game time: 1:00 P.M. EST
- Game weather: Temperature: 62 °F (17 °C) • Weather: Showers
- Game attendance: 610
- Referee: Richard Caldwell
- Recap, box score

Game information

First quarter

- (12:00) VUU – Said Sidibe 33-yard pass from Christian Reid, Brady Myers kick (Drive: 6 plays, 70 yards, 3:00; Virginia Union 7–0)
- (3:29) VUU – Jada Byers 7-yard run, Brady Myers kick (Drive: 5 plays, 85 yards, 2:52; Virginia Union 14–0)

Second quarter

- (8:58) BSU – Justin Zavala 48-yard field goal (Drive: 7 plays, 39 yards, 3:11; Virginia Union 14–3)
- (1:34) VUU – Curtis Allen 3-yard run, Brady Myers kick (Drive: 5 plays, 78 yards, 2:38; Virginia Union 21–3)
- (0:29) VUU – Jada Byers 1-yard run, Brady Myers kick (Drive: 3 plays, 60 yards, 0:23; Virginia Union 28–3)

Third quarter

- (8:19) VUU – Jalen Mayo 0-yard blocked punt return, Brady Myers kick (Virginia Union 35–3)
- (7:13) VUU – Donald Gatling 40-yard fumble recovery, Brady Myers kick (Virginia Union 42–3)
- (5:00) VUU – Kory Fleming 48-yard pass from Christian Reid, Brady Myers kick (Drive: 1 plays, 48 yards, 0:11; Virginia Union 49–3)

Fourth quarter

- (7:14) VUU – Brady Myers 46-yard field goal (Drive: 7 plays, 39 yards, 4:08; Virginia Union 52–3)

Statistics	BSU	VUU
First downs	13	18
Plays–yards	138	458
Rushes–yards	76	299
Passing yards	62	159
Passing: comp–att–int	7–18–2	9–17–1
Time of possession	32:52	26:56

Team	Category	Player	Statistics
Bowie State	Passing	Amir Jenkins	4/9, 33 yards, 1 INT
Bowie State	Rushing	Corey Johnson	22 carries, 80 yards
Bowie State	Receiving	James McNeill III	2 receptions, 23 yards
Virginia Union	Passing	Christian Reid	6/14, 127 yards, 2 TDs, 1 INT
Virginia Union	Rushing	Jada Byers	19 carries, 223 yards, 2 TDs
Virginia Union	Receiving	Said Sidibe	5 receptions, 78 yards, 1 TD

=== Lincoln (PA) ===
Game Eight – Virginia Union Panthers (6–1) vs Lincoln (PA) Lions (4–3)

Quarter	1	2	3	4	Total
Lincoln (PA)	0	0	0	0	0
Virginia Union	17	7	26	7	57

at Hovey Field • Richmond, Virginia

- Date: Saturday, October 21, 2023
- Game time: 1:00 P.M. EST
- Game weather: Temperature: 66 °F (19 °C) • Weather: Sunny
- Game attendance: 5,250
- Referee: S. Demingo
- Box score

Game information

First quarter

- (12:44) VUU – Jada Byers 7-yard run, Brady Myers kick (Drive: 4 plays, 38 yards, 1:23; Virginia Union 7–0)
- (12:34) VUU – Said Sidibe 0-yard fumble recovery, Brady Myers kick (Virginia Union 14–0)
- (3:15) VUU – Brady Myers 24-yard field goal (Drive: 11 plays, 51 yards, 5:55; Virginia Union 17–0)

Second quarter

- (10:02) VUU – Jada Byers 5-yard run, Brady Myers kick (Drive: 5 plays, 74 yards, 3:03; Virginia Union 24–0)

Third quarter

- (10:14) VUU – Jada Byers 1-yard run, Brady Myers kick (Drive: 9 plays, 31 yards, 4:46; Virginia Union 31–0)
- (6:56) VUU – Jada Byers 9-yard run, Brady Myers kick (Drive: 6 plays, 55 yards, 2:08; Virginia Union 38–0)
- (3:57) VUU – Jada Byers 30-yard pass from Nahsir Morgan Sr., Brady Myers kick failed (Drive: 1 play, 30 yards, 0:07; Virginia Union 44–0)
- (2:25) VUU – Ricky Key Jr. 26-yard pass from RJ Rosales, Brady Myers kick failed (Drive: 1 play, 41 yards, 0:00; Virginia Union 50–0)

Fourth quarter

- (0:47) VUU – RJ Rosales 19-yard run, Brady Myers kick (Drive: 6 plays, 50 yards, 3:27; Virginia Union 57–0)

Statistics	LIN	VUU
First downs	10	23
Plays–yards	168	481
Rushes–yards	86	249
Passing yards	82	232
Passing: comp–att–int	10–23–0	11–20–0
Time of possession	33:16	26:44

Team	Category	Player	Statistics
Lincoln (PA)	Passing	Isaiah Freeman	8/21, 69 yards
Lincoln (PA)	Rushing	Amir Gerald	12 carries, 44 yards
Lincoln (PA)	Receiving	Malachi Langley	4 receptions, 24 yards
Virginia Union	Passing	Christian Reid	9/16, 176 yards
Virginia Union	Rushing	Christian Reid	4 carries, 65 yards
Virginia Union	Receiving	Reginald Vick Jr.	1 reception, 58 yards

=== At Bluefield State ===
Game Nine – No. 23 Virginia Union Panthers (7–1) vs Bluefield State Big Blues (1–7)

Quarter	1	2	3	4	Total
No. 23 Virginia Union	7	20	14	16	57
Bluefield State	0	6	0	6	12

at Mitchell Stadium • Bluefield, West Virginia

- Date: Saturday, October 28, 2023
- Game time: 1:00 P.M. EST
- Game weather: Temperature: 70 °F (21 °C) • Weather: Partly cloudy
- Game attendance: 283
- Referee: Derek Hatten
- Recap, box score

Game information

First quarter

- (7:53) VUU – Curtis Allen 2-yard run, Brady Myers kick (Drive: 8 plays, 80 yards, 4:15; Virginia Union 7–0)

Second quarter

- (10:47) VUU – Said Sidibe 10-yard run, Brady Myers kick (Drive: 6 plays, 86 yards, 2:59; Virginia Union 14–0)
- (3:16) VUU – Reginald Vick Jr. 81-yard pass from Christian Reid, Brady Myers kick blocked (Drive: 3 plays, 76 yards, 1:06; Virginia Union 20–0)
- (1:22) BLU – Darius Thompson 3-yard pass from Isiah Teal, Braxton Vanscoy kick blocked (Drive: 6 plays, 72 yards, 1:46; Virginia Union 20–6)
- (1:01) VUU – Nahsir Morgan Sr. 87-yard kickoff return, Brady Myers kick (Virginia Union 27–6)

Third quarter

- (12:52) VUU – Jada Byers 9-yard run, Brady Myers kick (Drive: 5 plays, 55 yards, 2:01; Virginia Union 34–6)
- (5:33) VUU – Curtis Allen 7-yard run, Brady Myers kick (Drive: 8 plays, 88 yards, 3:26; Virginia Union 41–6)

Fourth quarter

- (13:59) VUU – RJ Rosales 2-yard run, Brady Myers kick (Drive: 7 plays, 73 yards, 3:26; Virginia Union 48–6)
- (10:57) BLU – Lucas Moore 31-yard pass from Isiah Teal, Isiah Teal pass intercepted (Drive: 5 plays, 75 yards, 2:58; Virginia Union 48–12)
- (10:57) VUU – Ephraim Moore 98-yard PAT return (Virginia Union 50–12)
- (5:18) VUU – Kenneth Davis 1-yard run, Josue Hernandez kick (Drive: 6 plays, 33 yards, 2:18; Virginia Union 57–12)

Statistics	VUU	BLU
First downs	26	9
Plays–yards	520	180
Rushes–yards	186	-5
Passing yards	334	185
Passing: comp–att–int	16–31–1	15–30–2
Time of possession	33:19	26:41

Team	Category	Player	Statistics
Virginia Union	Passing	Christian Reid	12/19, 276 yards, 1 TD
Virginia Union	Rushing	Jada Byers	12 carries, 67 yards, 1 TD
Virginia Union	Receiving	Said Sidibe	8 receptions, 165 yards
Bluefield State	Passing	Isiah Teal	15/30, 185 yards, 2 TDs, 2 INTs
Bluefield State	Rushing	Jahdi Loftlant	9 carries, 29 yards
Bluefield State	Receiving	Khyon Smith	2 receptions, 49 yards

=== No. 22 Virginia State ===
Game Ten – No. 19 Virginia Union Panthers (8–1) vs No. 22 Virginia State Trojans (8–1)

Quarter	1	2	3	4	Total
No. 22 Virginia State	0	0	0	0	0
No. 19 Virginia Union	17	7	26	7	57

at Hovey Field • Richmond, Virginia

- Date: Saturday, November 4, 2023
- Game time: 1:00 P.M. EST
- Game weather: Temperature: 64 °F (18 °C) • Weather: Sunny
- Game attendance: 15,000
- Referee: Ryan Massey
- Recap, box score

Game information

First quarter

- (12:10) VUU – Kory Fleming 29-yard pass from Christian Reid, Brady Myers kick (Drive: 5 plays, 65 yards, 2:50; Virginia Union 7–0)

Second quarter

- (8:12) VUU – Said Sidibe 62-yard pass from Christian Reid, Brady Myers kick (Drive: 2 plays, 62 yards, 0:51; Virginia Union 14–0)
- (6:14) VSU – Jordan Davis 1-yard run, Kyler Miller kick (Drive: 4 plays, 72 yards, 1:51; Virginia Union 14–7)
- (1:34) VSU – Malik Hunter 34-yard pass from Jordan Davis, Kyler Miller kick blocked (Drive: 6 plays, 70 yards, 3:03; Virginia Union 14–13)
- (1:34) VUU – Ephraim Moore 98-yard PAT return (Virginia Union 16–13)
- (0:24) VUU – Ricky Key Jr. 21-yard pass from Christian Reid, Brady Myers kick (Drive: 5 plays, 61 yards, 1:08; Virginia Union 23–13)

Third quarter

- (9:29) VUU – Jada Byers 7-yard pass from Christian Reid, Brady Myers kick (Drive: 8 plays, 40 yards, 5:22; Virginia Union 30–13)
- (4:39) VSU – Roy Jackson III 43-yard pass from Jordan Davis, Kyle Miller kick (Drive: 3 plays, 67 yards, 0:54; Virginia Union 30–20)

Fourth quarter

No scoring

Statistics	VSU	VUU
First downs	23	17
Plays–yards	465	337
Rushes–yards	85	186
Passing yards	380	151
Passing: comp–att–int	24–42–3	8–14–2
Time of possession	29:27	30:33

Team	Category	Player	Statistics
Virginia State	Passing	Jordan Davis	24/42, 380 yards, 2 TDs, 3 INTs
Virginia State	Rushing	Kymani Clarke	18 carries, 59 yards
Virginia State	Receiving	Roy Jackson III	3 receptions, 127 yards, 1 TD
Virginia Union	Passing	Christian Reid	8/14, 151 yards, 4 TDs, 2 INTs
Virginia Union	Rushing	Jada Byers	27 carries, 155 yards
Virginia Union	Receiving	Said Sidibe	1 reception, 62 yards, 1 TD

=== Vs. Fayetteville State (CIAA Championship) ===
Game Eleven – No. 18 Virginia Union Panthers (9–1) vs Fayetteville State Broncos (8–2)

Quarter	1	2	3	4	Total
No. 18 Virginia Union	7	7	7	0	21
Fayetteville State	0	7	3	0	10

at Salem Civic Center • Salem, Virginia

- Date: Sunday, November 11, 2023
- Game time: 3:00 P.M. EST
- Game weather: Temperature: 58 °F (14 °C) • Weather: Sunny
- Referee: Richard Caldwell
- Recap, box score

Game information

First quarter

- (7:27) VUU – Jada Byers 1-yard run, Brady Myers kick (Drive: 13 plays, 75 yards, 7:25; Virginia Union 7–0)

Second quarter

- (1:00) VUU – Christian Reid 1-yard run, Brady Myers kick (Drive: 10 plays, 49 yards, 4:12; Virginia Union 14–0)
- (0:47) FSU – Barry Elliott 91-yard kickoff return, Jacob Meneses kick (Virginia Union 14–7)

Third quarter

- (11:57) FSU – Jacob Meneses 20-yard field goal (Virginia Union 14–10)
- (7:25) VUU – Jada Byers 16-yard run, Brady Myers kick (Drive: 5 plays, 27 yards, 2:46; Virginia Union 21–10)

Fourth quarter

No scoring

Statistics	VUU	FSU
First downs	20	7
Plays–yards	222	130
Rushes–yards	158	36
Passing yards	64	94
Passing: comp–att–int	8–15–0	6–20–0
Time of possession	39:28	20:38

Team	Category	Player	Statistics
Virginia Union	Passing	Christian Reid	8/15, 64 yards
Virginia Union	Rushing	Jada Byers	40 carries, 135 yards, 2 TDs
Virginia Union	Receiving	Reginald Vick Jr.	5 receptions, 42 yards
Fayetteville State	Passing	Demari Daniels	5/12, 89 yards
Fayetteville State	Rushing	Julian Milligan	7 carries, 28 yards
Fayetteville State	Receiving	Kameron King	3 receptions, 74 yards

=== At No. 7 Kutztown (NCAA Division II First Round) ===
Game Eleven – No. 13 Virginia Union Panthers (10–1) vs No. 7 Kutztown Golden Bears (9–2)

Quarter	1	2	3	4	Total
No. 13 Virginia Union	0	7	7	0	14
No. 7 Kutztown	21	14	0	3	38

at Andre Reed Stadium • Kutztown, Pennsylvania

- Date: Saturday, November 18, 2023
- Game time: 12:00 P.M. EST
- Game weather: Temperature: 46 °F (8 °C) • Weather: Sunny
- Game attendance: 1,470
- Referee: Derek Hatten
- Recap, box score

Game information

First quarter

- (8:53) KUT – Darryl Davis-McNeil 1-yard run, Dawson Evitts kick (Drive: 10 plays, 75 yards, 6:07; Kutztown 7–0)
- (3:09) KUT – Mekhi Gibson 8-yard run, Dawson Evitts kick (Drive: 7 plays, 65 yards, 3:38; Kutztown 14–0)
- (0:43) KUT – Luke Szabo 2-yard punt return, Dawson Evitts kick (Kutztown 21–0)

Second quarter

- (9:44) KUT – Tyreek Husser 7-yard pass from Judd Novak, Dawson Evitts kick (Drive: 6 plays, 70 yards, 3:41; Kutztown 28–0)
- (3:26) VUU – Kenneth Davis 10-yard punt return, Brady Myers kick (Kutztown 28–7)
- (0:35) KUT – Kurtis Ravenel Jr. 29-yard pass from Judd Novak, Dawson Evitts kick (Drive: 8 plays, 80 yards, 2:44; Kutztown 35–7)

Third quarter

- (9:29) VUU – Jada Byers 8-yard run, Brady Myers kick (Drive: 9 plays, 76 yards, 5:24; Kutztown 35–14)

Fourth quarter

- (5:03) KUT – Dawson Evitts 24-yard field goal (Drive: 10 plays, 44 yards, 5:54; Kutztown 38–14)

Statistics	VUU	KUT
First downs	13	22
Plays–yards	272	367
Rushes–yards	149	210
Passing yards	123	157
Passing: comp–att–int	16–27–0	8–18–0
Time of possession	28:04	31:56

Team	Category	Player	Statistics
Virginia Union	Passing	Christian Reid	16/26, 123 yards
Virginia Union	Rushing	Jada Byers	20 carries, 101 yards, 1 TD
Virginia Union	Receiving	Ricky Key Jr.	3 receptions, 34 yards
Kutztown	Passing	Judd Novak	8/18, 157 yards, 2 TDs
Kutztown	Rushing	Darryl Davis-McNeill	25 carries, 94 yards, 1 TD
Kutztown	Receiving	Kurtis Ravenel Jr.	3 receptions, 65 yards, 1 TD

== Personnel ==
=== Coaching staff ===
Virginia Union Panthers
Name	Position	Consecutive season at Virginia Union Panthers in current position	Previous position	VUU profile
Alvin Parker	Head coach	5th	St. Augustine's assistant head coach and offensive coordinator (2016–2017)	
Edward Pointer	Assistant head coach, defensive coordinator, and linebackers coach	5th	St. Augustine's defensive coordinator (2016–2017)	
Diego Ryland	Associate head coach, special teams coordinator, and running backs coach	5th	Hampton running backs coach (2017)	
Monterio Hand	Wide receivers coach	5th	Elizabeth City State special teams coordinator, wide receivers coach, and tight ends coach (2004–2017)	
Luke Bengston	Offensive coordinator and quarterbacks coach	1st	Virginia Union pass game coordinator and quarterbacks coach (2022)	
Quinn Brown	Run game coordinator and offensive line coach	1st	Henderson State assistant head coach, run game coordinator, and offensive line coach (2019–2022)	
Solomon Brown	Defensive run game coordinator and defensive line coach	1st	Virginia Union defensive line coach (2022)	
Nico Rogers	Secondary coach	1st	Virginia Union safeties coach (2022)	
Justin Smith	Tight ends coach	1st	Virginia Union graduate assistant (2021–2022)	
Evan Jones	Cornerbacks coach	1st	Stevenson defensive pass game coordinator and defensive backs coach (2020–2022)	
Ryan Gould	Defensive ends coach	1st	Richard J. Reynolds HS (NC) co-offensive coordinator, run game coordinator, and offensive line coach (2021–2022)	

==== Support staff ====
- Lane Washington – Director of football operations
- Bernard Rucker – Equipment manager
- Keith Swinson – Assistant equipment manager
- Joe Ellison – Team chaplain

=== Roster ===
2023 Virginia Union Panthers football team roster
Players
Coaches
Offense

Pos.	#	Name	Class
QB	1	Christian Reid	GS
WR	2	Said Sidibe	Sr
RB	3	Jada Byers	Jr
QB	4	J'Bore' Gibbs	GS
RB	5	Rashard Jackson	Sr
RB	9	Curtis Allen	So
QB	10	Jonathan Derricott	Fr
WR	11	Larry Hackey	Jr
QB	12	Navarro Price	Jr
QB	13	Tayvon Tyler	Fr
WR	14	Mykael Anderson	Jr
TE	15	Kory Fleming	GS
WR	16	Nahsir Morgan Sr.	Jr
QB	18	RJ Rosales	So
WR	19	Keyon Dickens	Jr
RB	20	Kenneth Davis	GS
RB	21	David Freeman	Sr
WR	23	Elijah Rice	Sr
RB	24	Jerome Jones	Fr
RB	30	Roberto Alvarez Jr.	Fr
FB	34	Steven McKinney	Jr
WR	38	Uriah Lawrence	So
FB	42	Joe Johnson	GS
FB	43	Jimmie Reed	So
FB	46	Jerry Newmy	Fr
OL	55	Adrian Crespin	Fr
OL	57	Mathias Nielsen	Fr
OL	58	Justin Meade	Sr
OL	59	Mark Lawton	Jr
OL	60	Joseph Rounds	Fr
OL	61	DeMont Wynee	Jr
OL	62	Keondre Ruff	So
OL	63	Larry Jones Jr.	So
OL	65	Jamaree Moyer	So
OL	68	Isaiah Butcher	Fr
OL	70	Dillon Porter	So
OL	72	Devonte Boyd	So
OL	75	Dequan Boone	So
OL	76	Justin Royes	Fr
OL	77	Isaiah Whitehurst	Fr
OL	78	Trai'von Callis	Fr
OL	79	Shawn Battle II	Fr
TE	80	Kalen Carver	Jr
WR	81	Ricky Key Jr.	So
WR	82	Jasim Brown	So
WR	83	Jordan Cotman	So
WR	84	Isaiah Wallace	Fr
TE	85	Juelz Cooper	Fr
WR	86	Reginald Vick Jr.	Fr
WR	89	Shane McNeil	So
WR		Corie Addo	So
WR		Lyvarius Gilbert	Fr
WR		Jeremiah Jordan	So

Defense

Pos.	#	Name	Class
S	0	William Davis	Jr
S	1	Nehemiah Scott	So
CB	4	Raylyn Manley	So
DE	5	Armonii Burden	GS
LB	6	Shamar Graham	So
S	7	Sean Bowers	Sr
DE	8	Jah'Ke Hilliard	Jr
DL	9	Isaac Anderson	Jr
CB	10	Ephraim Moore	Sr
S	12	Donald Gatling	So
S	17	Jabari Parker	So
S	22	Jalen Mayo	Fr
S	23	R'mondo Walker	So
CB	25	Xzavier Barnes	So
CB	26	Satchel McKinney	Jr
S	27	Jymere Melendez	Fr
CB	28	Jayden Earley	Fr
LB	32	Lamumba Howard	Jr
LB	33	Decari Randle	Jr
CB	35	Niko McKay	So
CB	36	Aarenamon Johnson	Fr
S	37	Kyle Kidewell	So
S	39	Damon Etheridge	Fr
CB	40	Jayden White	Fr
S	41	Demari Mason	Fr
LB	45	Brandan Cammarasana	Fr
S	47	Nathaniel Knox	Fr
DE	48	Jahmel Flowers	Jr
LB	49	Zachary Weaver	Fr
LB	51	Noah Livingston	So
DL	52	De'Andre Crump	Fr
DE	53	Carlik Humes	Sr
LB	56	Diamondz Wells	Fr
DL	90	Samuel Arrey	Fr
DL	93	Kamari Federick	Fr
DL	94	Bramon Lane	Jr
DL	95	Isaiah Dickens	GS
DL	96	Jalen Williamson	So
DL	97	Jordan Kamara	Fr
DL	98	Jadacus Logan	So
DL	99	Tajhir Tate	GS
CB		Sean Macon	Fr

Special teams

Pos.	#	Name	Class
P	29	Marvin Holmes	Jr
PK	50	Josue Hernandez	Jr
LS	54	Alexandre Lafontant	Fr
LS	87	Rodney Manning	So
PK	88	Brady Myers	So

Head coach

- Alvin Parker

Coordinators/assistant coaches

- Edward Pointer – Assistant head coach/defensive coordinator/linebackers
- Diego Ryland – Associate head coach/special teams coordinator/running backs
- Monterio Hand – Wide receivers
- Luke Bengtson – Offensive coordinator/quarterbacks
- Quinn Brown – Offensive line/run game coordinator
- Solomon Brown – Defensive line/defensive run game coordinator
- Nico Rogers – Secondary
- Anthony Prevost – Specialist
- Justin Smith – Tight ends
- Evan Jones – Cornerbacks
- Ryan Gould – Defensive ends
- Lane Washington – Director of football operations
- Bernard Rucker – Equipment manager
- Keith Swinson – Assistant equipment manager
- Joe Ellison – Team chaplain

Legend

- (C) Team captain
- (S) Suspended
- (I) Ineligible
- Injured
- Redshirt

Roster
Last update: 1/18/24

== Rankings ==
Ranking movements Legend: ██ Increase in ranking ██ Decrease in ranking RV = Received votes
	Week												
Poll	Pre	1	2	3	4	5	6	7	8	9	10	11	Final
AFCA	18	17	17	15	RV	RV	RV	RV	23	19	18	13	20
D2	22	24	18	16	24	23	22	20	20	20	18	17	24

== Statistics ==
=== Team ===
	Virginia Union	Opp
Points per game	35.5	13.8
Total	426	166
First downs	231	146
Rushing	132	42
Passing	74	78
Penalty	25	26
Rushing yards	2,602	620
Avg per play	5.2	1.7
Avg per game	216.8	51.7
Rushing touchdowns	31	3
Passing yards	1,870	2,173
Att–Comp–Int	231–128–9	336–164–18
Avg per pass	8.1	6.5
Avg per game	155.8	181.1
Passing touchdowns	18	15
Total offense	4,472	2,793
Avg per play	6.1	4.0
Avg per game	372.7	232.8
Fumbles–Lost	7–6	21–10
Penalties–Yards	97–933	91–795
Avg per game	77.8	66.3
Punts–Yards	52–1,944	82–2,730
Avg per punt	33.3	28.7
Time of possession/Game	31:40	28:06
3rd down conversions	50–138	45–167
4th down conversions	6–17	7–22
Sacks–Yards	25–129	19–128
Touchdowns scored	58	23
Field goals–Attempts	5–11	4–7
PAT–Attempts	55–58	16–21
Red Zone Attempts–Score	34–39	10–18
Red Zone TD	30	7
Attendance	21,531	4,158
Games/Avg per Game	5,382.8	831.6
Neutral Site	9,333	

=== Individual leaders ===
==== Offense ====
Passing statistics
#	NAME	POS	RAT	CMP	ATT	YDS	AVG/G	CMP%	TD	INT	LONG
1	Christian Reid	QB	143.23	106	185	1,501	125.1	57.3%	13	5	81
18	RJ Rosales	QB	128.01	20	41	301	37.6	48.8%	4	3	33
16	Nashir Morgan Sr.	WR	367.1	2	3	68	9.7	75.0%	1	0	38
4	J'Bore' Gibbs	QB	-100.0	0	2	0	0.0	0.0%	0	1	0

Rushing statistics
#	NAME	POS	ATT	GAIN	AVG	TD	LONG	AVG/G
3	Jada Byers	RB	205	1,186	5.8	16	57	118.6
9	Curtis Allen	RB	117	660	5.6	6	60	55.0
5	Rashard Jackson	RB	52	281	5.4	2	13	46.8
18	RJ Rosales	QB	20	130	6.5	4	25	16.3
21	David Freeman	RB	23	115	5.0	0	38	23.0
1	Christian Reid	QB	48	55	1.1	1	29	4.6
20	Kenneth Davis	RB	8	48	6.0	1	22	4.8
11	Larry Hackey	WR	5	36	7.2	0	13	3.0
2	Said Sidibe	WR	7	34	4.9	1	20	2.8
24	Jerome Jones	RB	3	21	7.0	0	11	3.0
30	Robert Alvarez Jr.	RB	4	19	4.8	0	10	19.0
16	Nahsir Morgan Sr.	WR	1	18	18.0	0	18	2.6
14	Mykael Anderson	WR	1	15	15.0	0	15	2.5
29	Marvin Holmes	P	1	-7	-7.0	0	0	-0.6

Receiving statistics
#	NAME	POS	CTH	YDS	AVG	TD	LONG	AVG/G

== After the season ==
=== Awards and CIAA honors ===
Weekly Honors
Recipient	Weekly Award (CIAA)	Week #	Date awarded	Ref.
Justin Meade, OL	Offensive Lineman of the Week	1	September 5, 2023	
Jada Byers, RB	Offensive Back of the Week	1	September 5, 2023	
Brady Myers, PK	Special Teams Player of the Week	1	September 5, 2023	
William Davis, DB	Defensive Back of the Week	2	September 11, 2023	
Shamar Graham, LB	Linebacker of the Week	2	September 11, 2023	
Isaac Anderson, DE	Defensive Lineman of the Week	4	September 25, 2023	
Curtis Allen, RB	Offensive Back of the Week	5	October 2, 2023	
Jada Byers, RB	Offensive Back of the Week	6	October 9, 2023	
Justin Meade, OL	Offensive Lineman of the Week	7	October 16, 2023	
Jada Byers, RB	Offensive Back of the Week	7	October 16, 2023	
Isaac Anderson, DL	Defensive Lineman of the Week	7	October 16, 2023	
Justin Meade	Offensive Lineman of the Week	8	October 23, 2023	
Justin Meade, OL	Offensive Lineman of the Week	9	October 30, 2023	
Said Sidibe, WR	Receiver of the Week	9	October 30, 2023	
Justin Meade, OL	Offensive Lineman of the Week	10	November 6, 2023	
Jada Byers, RB	Offensive Back of the Week	10	November 6, 2023	
Shamar Graham, LB	Linebacker of the Week	10	November 6, 2023	

Central Intercollegiate Athletic Association Individual Awards
Recipient	Award	Date awarded	Ref.
Alvin Parker	Coach of the Year	November 10, 2023	
Justin Meade	Offensive Lineman of the Year	November 10, 2023	
Brady Myers	Special teams Player of the Year	November 10, 2023	

=== All-CIAA ===
All-CIAA First-Team
Player	Position
Jada Byers	RB
Kalen Carver	TE
Justin Meade	OL
Jamaree Mayer	OL
Isaac Anderson	DL
Shamar Graham	LB
Brady Myers	PK

All-CIAA Second-Team
Player	Position
Mathias Nelson	OL

All-CIAA Rookie
Player	Position
Mathias Nelson	OL
Jalen Mayo	S
Kamari Federick	DL
