= Sean Gilbert =

American football player and coach (born 1970)

Livingstone Blue Bears
- Title: Head coach

Personal information
- Born: April 10, 1970 (age 56); Aliquippa, Pennsylvania, U.S.
- Listed height: 6 ft 5 in (1.96 m)
- Listed weight: 318 lb (144 kg)

Career information
- High school: Aliquippa
- College: Pittsburgh
- NFL draft: 1992: 1st round, 3rd overall pick

Career history

Playing
- Los Angeles / St. Louis Rams (1992–1995); Washington Redskins (1996); Carolina Panthers (1998–2002); Oakland Raiders (2003)

Coaching
- Livingstone (2020–present) Head coach

Awards and highlights
- Pro Bowl (1993); PFWA All-Rookie Team (1992); First-team All-East (1991)

Career NFL statistics
- Tackles: 475
- Sacks: 42.5
- Forced fumbles: 11
- Fumble recoveries: 3
- Interceptions: 2
- Stats at Pro Football Reference

Head coaching record
- Career: 20–29 (.408)

Sean Gilbert (born April 10, 1970) is an American college football coach and former professional player. He is the head football coach for Livingstone College, a position he has held since 2020. Gilbert played as a defensive tackle in the National Football League (NFL) . He was selected by the Los Angeles Rams as the third overall pick of the 1992 NFL draft. He played college football at University of Pittsburgh.

== Early life ==
Gilbert played football for the Aliquippa Quips. As a senior Gilbert was a Parade Magazine All-America and the USA Today Prep Defensive Player of the Year and the Associated Press named him to its First-team All-state after leading the "Quips" to a 14–1 record and a Western Pennsylvania AAA championship. He made 91 tackles as a senior and recovered two fumbles for touchdowns. He also played guard on offense for Aliquippa.

== College career ==
As a defensive tackle Gilbert was an All-America choice in 1991. He had 99 tackles (21 for a loss) and 6 sacks in his final two seasons at Pitt. In 1991 against Penn State, Gilbert totaled 11 tackles (6 for a loss) and 1 sack. One observer said Gilbert "played like a man possessed.".As a senior Gilbert had 17 tackles for a loss and 4 sacks. Gilbert played in 6 games, missing almost half of the season with a knee injury. He did not play as a freshman due to the NCAA "Prop 48 rule." While playing at the University of Pittsburgh, he played with a stellar list of teammates and coaches. On the coaching staff while he was there were Jon Gruden, Mike McCarthy and Marvin Lewis, all of whom later became NFL head coaches. His teammates included NFL standouts Curtis Martin, Billy Davis, Keith Hamilton, Anthony Dorsett and WWE wrestler Matt Bloom.

== Professional career ==
=== Pre-draft ===
Pre-draft measurables
Height	Weight	Arm length	Hand span	40-yard dash	Bench press
6 ft 4 1/4 in (1.94 m)	315 lb (143 kg)	35 1/4 in (0.90 m)	9 3/4 in (0.25 m)	4.80 s	22 reps
All values from NFL Combine

Bench Press: 440 lbs.

Gilbert entered the 1992 NFL Draft as a junior after only two collegiate seasons, where he was selected as the third overall pick by the Los Angeles Rams.

=== Los Angeles / St. Louis Rams ===
On April 27, 1992, Gilbert signed a five-year $7.5 million contract, including a $3 million signing bonus.

Gilbert started as a rookie, recorded 5 sacks, and was named All-rookie by Pro Football Writers Association. In 1993 Gilbert was voted to his first Pro Bowl and recorded 10.5 sacks. He was also an All-NFC choice by UPI and Pro Football Weekly. In addition he was named All-Madden and was the NFC Defensive Player of the Week after a 4 sack performance against the Pittsburgh Steelers.

In 1995 Gilbert moved to right defensive end (RDE) and was a Pro Bowl alternate, recording 5.5 sacks. The signing of Pro Bowl RDE Leslie O'Neal made Gilbert expendable. "We've got Kevin Carter, D'Marco Farr, Jimmie Jones, and Leslie O'Neal", Rams vice president and director of football operations Steve Ortmayer said.

=== Washington Redskins ===
On April 8, 1996, he was traded to the Washington Redskins for a first-round pick (sixth overall) in the 1996 NFL draft.

With the Redskins, Gilbert was again an alternate to the Pro Bowl. He had 113 tackles and 3 sacks and was a force against the run. As Rams quarterback Steve Walsh said, "Sean Gilbert is playing like a monster." He also helped the defense by drawing double-team blocking. He sprained his knee against the Dallas Cowboys on Thanksgiving Day.

The Redskins made Gilbert their franchise player, but rather than sign the one-year $3.4 million tender offer, Gilbert sat out the 1997 season. After the 1997 season the Redskins again made Gilbert a franchise player, this time offering a one-year contract for $2.97 million (the average of the 5 highest paid DTs). Gilbert objected and asked for arbitration saying the Redskins did not have the right to place their franchise player tag on him for a second straight year. On March 17, 1998, the NFLPA and the NFL had an all-day hearing to resolve the case.

=== Carolina Panthers ===
The Redskins received compensation of two first round draft picks from the Carolina Panthers for not matching the Panthers offer of $46.5 million. Gilbert returned to right defensive end in 1998 and recorded 81 tackles, 25 quarterback pressures, and 6 sacks, starting all 16 games. In 1999 and 2000 Gilbert moved to his preferred right defensive tackle position and averaged 50 tackles and 3 sacks during those two seasons. In 2001, Gilbert switched to left defensive tackle and recorded 25 tackles and 2 sacks, playing and starting in only nine games due to injury.

Gilbert broke his right hip on October 27, 2002, during a game versus the Tampa Bay Buccaneers and missed the last eight games of the season. Gilbert totaled 5 tackles during the injury-shortened season.

On March 10, 2003, the Panthers released Gilbert.

=== Oakland Raiders ===
The Raiders signed him on October 29, 2003. He ended the year with 7 tackles. After the season. Gilbert became an unrestricted free agent and after not being picked up by a team, he decided to retire.

== Coaching career ==
Gilbert was an assistant football coach at South Mecklenburg High School and West Charlotte High School in Charlotte, North Carolina. In January 2020, he was hired as the head football coach at Livingstone College in Salisbury, North Carolina.

== Family ==
Gilbert and his wife, Nicole, have four children: Deshaun, A'lexus, Zaccheaus, and A'lea. Gilbert is the uncle of former NFL cornerback Darrelle Revis and current cornerback Mark Gilbert.

== Head coaching record ==
Year	Team	Overall	Conference	Standing	Bowl/playoffs
Livingstone Blue Bears (Central Intercollegiate Athletic Association) (2020–present)
2020–21	No team—COVID-19				
2021	Livingstone	1–8	1–5	T–4th (Southern)	
2022	Livingstone	4–6	3–5	4th (Southern)	
2023	Livingstone	4–6	4–4	T–3rd (Southern)	
2024	Livingstone	6–4	4–3	T–5th	
2025	Livingstone	5–5	3–4	6th	
Livingstone:		20–29	15–21		
Total:		20–29			
