= 2023 NCAA Division II football season =

American college football season

- Total No. of teams: 163
- Regular season: August 31 – November 11, 2023
- Playoffs: November 18 – December 16, 2023
- National Championship: McKinney Independent School District Stadium; McKinney, TX; December 16, 2023
- Champion: Harding
- Harlon Hill Trophy: Zach Zebrowski, QB, Central Missouri

The 2023 NCAA Division II football season, part of college football in the United States organized by the National Collegiate Athletic Association (NCAA) at the Division II level, began on August 31 and ended on December 16 with the Division II championship at the McKinney Independent School District Stadium in McKinney, Texas. Harding won the title, defeating Colorado Mines, 38–7.

== D-II team wins over FCS teams ==
September 2: Bowie State 22, Delaware State 11
September 2: Virginia State 33, Norfolk State 24
September 2: Central State (OH) 24, Mississippi Valley State 21
September 8: Barton 33, Davidson 31
September 9: Colorado Mesa 28, San Diego 21 ^{OT}
September 9: Miles 21, Alabama State 17
September 16: Delta State 35, Mississippi Valley State 7

== Conference changes and new programs ==
School	Former conference	New conference
Alderson Broaddus Battlers	Mountain East	School closed
Bluefield State Big Blue	Independent (D-II)	CIAA
Chowan Hawks	CIAA	Gulf South
Lincoln (MO) Blue Tigers	MIAA	GLVC
Simon Fraser Red Leafs	Lone Star	Dropped program
Thomas More Saints	Mid-South (NAIA)	G-MAC
Upper Iowa Peacocks	Northern Sun	GLVC

== Headlines ==
- January 14 – At the 2023 NCAA Convention, the D-II football membership approved a change to redshirt rules to allow freshmen to play in up to three games without losing a season of athletic eligibility.
- January 26 – Conference Carolinas announced that Shorter University would join from the Gulf South Conference in 2024. This gave the conference 6 football sponsoring members, and accordingly, it was announced that they would begin sponsoring football again effective for the 2025 season, a sport they had previously discontinued in 1975. Inaugural members of the new league would be Barton and Erskine, who currently play in the South Atlantic Conference; UNC Pembroke, who plays in the Mountain East Conference; and Chowan, North Greenville, and Shorter, who all play in the Gulf South Conference.
- December 14 – The NCAA Division II Championships Committee approved a restructuring of the football super regions effective for the 2025 season once Conference Carolinas begins sponsoring football. The new super region alignment is as follows:
  - Super Region 1: Central Intercollegiate Athletic Association, Mountain East Conference, Northeast-10 Conference, Pennsylvania State Athletic Conference
  - Super Region 2: Conference Carolinas, Gulf South Conference, South Atlantic Conference, Southern Intercollegiate Athletic Conference
  - Super Region 3: Great Lakes Intercollegiate Athletic Conference, Great Lakes Valley Conference, Great Midwest Athletic Conference, Northern Sun Intercollegiate Conference
  - Super Region 4: Great American Conference, Lone Star Conference, Mid-America Intercollegiate Athletics Association, Rocky Mountain Athletic Conference

== Rankings ==
The top 25 from the AFCA Coaches' Poll.

=== Preseason Poll ===
AFCA
Ranking	Team
1	Ferris State (29)
2	Colorado Mines
3	Grand Valley State
4	Pittsburg State
5	Angelo State
6	NW Missouri State
7	West Florida
8	Ouachita Baptist
9	Minnesota State
10	Delta State
11	Bemidji State
12	Ashland
13	Shepherd
14	Harding
15	Slippery Rock
16	IUP
17	Benedict (1)
18	Virginia Union
19	Emporia State
20	Indianapolis
21	Wingate
22	West Georgia
23	Assumption
24	Newberry
25	Lenoir–Rhyne

== Conference standings ==
=== Super Region 1 ===
2023 Great Midwest Athletic Conference football standings
	Conf.			Overall
Team	W		L	W		L
No. 14 Tiffin $^	9	–	0	11	–	1
Ashland #	8	–	1	9	–	3
Findlay	6	–	3	7	–	4
Hillsdale	6	–	3	6	–	5
Northwood	5	–	4	5	–	6
Thomas More*	4	–	5	5	–	6
Kentucky Wesleyan	3	–	6	4	–	7
Ohio Dominican	3	–	6	4	–	7
Walsh	1	–	8	3	–	8
Lake Erie	0	–	9	1	–	10
$ – Conference champion; ^ – NCAA Division II playoff participant; * – Thomas More ineligible for postseason play due to transition from NAIA # – America's Crossroads Bowl participant; Rankings from AFCA poll

2023 Mountain East Conference football standings
	Conf.			Overall
Team	W		L	W		L
No. 19 Charleston (WV) $^	8	–	1	10	–	2
Fairmont State	6	–	3	8	–	3
Frostburg State	6	–	3	7	–	3
Notre Dame (OH)	6	–	3	7	–	3
UNC Pembroke	6	–	3	7	–	3
Glenville State	5	–	4	6	–	4
Wheeling	4	–	5	5	–	5
West Liberty	4	–	5	4	–	6
West Virginia State	4	–	5	4	–	6
Concord	1	–	9	1	–	10
West Virginia Wesleyan	0	–	9	0	–	10
$ – Conference champion; ^ – NCAA Division II playoff participant; Rankings from AFCA Poll

2023 Northeast-10 Conference football standings
	Conf.			Overall
Team	W		L	W		L
New Haven $^	6	–	1	8	–	3
Bentley	5	–	2	6	–	4
Saint Anselm	5	–	2	6	–	4
Assumption	3	–	4	5	–	5
Franklin Pierce	3	–	4	4	–	6
Southern Connecticut	3	–	4	4	–	6
Pace	2	–	5	3	–	7
American International	1	–	6	3	–	8
$ – Conference champion; ^ – NCAA Division II playoff participant; Rankings from AFCA Poll

2023 Pennsylvania State Athletic Conference football standings
	Conf.			Overall
Team	W		L	W		L
East Division
No. 7 Kutztown xy$^	7	–	0	11	–	2
East Stroudsburg ^	5	–	2	9	–	3
Shepherd ^	5	–	2	9	–	3
West Chester	3	–	4	6	–	5
Lock Haven	3	–	4	5	–	6
Shippensburg	2	–	5	3	–	8
Bloomsburg	2	–	5	3	–	8
Millersville	1	–	6	3	–	8
West Division
No. 10 Slippery Rock xy^	7	–	0	12	–	2
California (PA)	6	–	1	7	–	3
Gannon	5	–	2	5	–	6
Seton Hill	4	–	3	6	–	5
IUP	3	–	4	6	–	5
Edinboro	1	–	6	3	–	8
Clarion	1	–	6	2	–	9
Mercyhurst	1	–	6	2	–	9
Championship: Kutztown 31, Slippery Rock 7
$ – Conference champion; x – Division champion/co-champions; y – Championship game participant; ^ – NCAA Division II playoff participant; Rankings from AFCA Poll

2023 NCAA Division II Super Region 1 independents football records
	Conf.			Overall
Team	W		L	W		L
Post		–		1	–	9
Rankings from AFCA Poll

=== Super Region 2 ===
2023 Central Intercollegiate Athletic Association football standings
	Conf.			Overall
Team	W		L	W		L
Northern Division
No. 20 Virginia Union xy$^	7	–	1	10	–	2
Virginia State	6	–	2	8	–	2
Bowie State	5	–	3	6	–	4
Lincoln (PA)	3	–	5	4	–	6
Elizabeth City State	2	–	6	3	–	7
Bluefield State	0	–	8	1	–	9
Southern Division
Fayetteville State xy	8	–	0	8	–	3
Johnson C. Smith #	6	–	2	7	–	4
Livingstone	4	–	4	4	–	6
Winston-Salem State	4	–	4	4	–	6
Shaw	3	–	5	3	–	7
St. Augustine's	0	–	8	0	–	10
Championship: Virginia Union 21, Fayetteville State 10
$ – Conference champion; x – Division champion/co-champions; y – Championship game participant; ^ – NCAA Division II playoff participant; # – Florida Beach Bowl participant; Rankings from AFCA Poll

2023 Gulf South Conference football standings
	Conf.			Overall
Team	W		L	W		L
No. 8 Valdosta State +^	7	–	1	12	–	2
No. 11 Delta State +^	7	–	1	10	–	2
No. 23 West Florida ^	6	–	2	8	–	4
West Georgia	5	–	3	6	–	4
North Greenville	4	–	4	5	–	5
West Alabama	4	–	4	5	–	5
Mississippi College	2	–	6	3	–	7
Shorter	1	–	7	3	–	8
Chowan	0	–	8	0	–	10
+ – Conference co-champions; ^ – NCAA Division II playoff participant; Rankings from AFCA Poll

2023 South Atlantic Conference football standings
	Conf.			Overall
Team	W		L	W		L
Mountain Division
Mars Hill x	7	–	2	8	–	2
Tusculum xy	6	–	3	6	–	5
Carson–Newman	4	–	5	5	–	6
Emory & Henry*	3	–	6	5	–	6
Virginia–Wise	1	–	8	2	–	9
Erskine	0	–	9	0	–	11
Piedmont Division
No. 4 Lenoir–Rhyne xy$^	8	–	1	13	–	2
Limestone x^	8	–	1	8	–	4
Wingate	7	–	2	8	–	3
Barton	4	–	5	6	–	5
Catawba	3	–	6	5	–	6
Newberry	3	–	6	4	–	7
Championship: Lenoir-Rhyne 48, Tusculum 7
$ – Conference champion; x – Division champion/co-champions; y – Championship game participant; ^ – NCAA Division II playoff participant; * – Emory & Henry ineligible for postseason play due to transition from NCAA Division III; Rankings from AFCA Poll

2023 Southern Intercollegiate Athletic Conference football standings
	Conf.			Overall
Team	W		L	W		L
No. 12 Benedict y$^	8	–	0	11	–	1
Albany State y	6	–	2	6	–	5
Fort Valley State #	6	–	2	8	–	3
Miles	6	–	2	7	–	3
Tuskegee	6	–	2	7	–	4
Allen*	5	–	3	7	–	3
Edward Waters*	5	–	3	6	–	4
Central State (OH)	4	–	4	5	–	5
Kentucky State	2	–	6	3	–	7
Lane	2	–	6	2	–	8
Morehouse	1	–	7	1	–	9
Savannah State	1	–	7	2	–	8
Clark Atlanta	0	–	8	0	–	10
Championship: Benedict 47, Albany State 10
$ – Conference champion; y – Championship game participant; ^ – NCAA Division II playoff participant; * – Allen and Edward Waters ineligible for postseason play due to transition from NAIA # – Florida Beach Bowl participant; Rankings from AFCA Poll

=== Super Region 3 ===
2023 Great American Conference football standings
	Conf.			Overall
Team	W		L	W		L
No. 1 Harding $^	11	–	0	15	–	0
No. 24 Henderson State ^	9	–	2	9	–	3
Ouachita Baptist	9	–	2	9	–	2
Southern Arkansas #	9	–	2	10	–	2
Oklahoma Baptist	6	–	5	6	–	5
Southern Nazarene #	6	–	5	6	–	6
Arkansas Tech	5	–	6	5	–	6
SE Oklahoma State	5	–	6	5	–	6
East Central	3	–	8	3	–	8
Arkansas–Monticello	2	–	9	2	–	9
NW Oklahoma State	1	–	10	1	–	10
SW Oklahoma State	0	–	11	0	–	11
$ – Conference champion; ^ – NCAA Division II playoff participant; # – bowl participant (Southern Nazarene: Heritage Bowl, Southern Arkansas: Live United Texarkana Bowl); Rankings from AFCA poll

2023 Great Lakes Intercollegiate Athletic Conference football standings
	Conf.			Overall
Team	W		L	W		L
No. 3 Grand Valley State $^	6	–	0	11	–	2
No. 9 Ferris State ^	5	–	1	8	–	3
Davenport	4	–	2	8	–	2
Saginaw Valley State	3	–	3	6	–	5
Wayne State (MI)	2	–	4	3	–	8
Michigan Tech	1	–	5	5	–	5
Northern Michigan	0	–	6	0	–	11
$ – Conference champion; ^ – NCAA Division II playoff participant; Rankings from AFCA Poll

2023 Great Lakes Valley Conference football standings
	Conf.			Overall
Team	W		L	W		L
No. 22 Indianapolis $^	6	–	1	9	–	2
Truman State	5	–	2	9	–	2
McKendree #	5	–	2	5	–	6
Missouri S&T	4	–	3	4	–	7
Quincy	3	–	4	6	–	5
Southwest Baptist	3	–	4	4	–	7
Upper Iowa	1	–	6	3	–	8
William Jewell	1	–	6	2	–	8
$ – Conference champion; ^ – NCAA Division II playoff participant; # – America's Crossroads Bowl participant; Rankings from AFCA Poll

2023 Mid-America Intercollegiate Athletics Association football standings
	Conf.			Overall
Team	W		L	W		L
No. 6 Central Missouri +^	9	–	1	11	–	2
No. 5 Pittsburg State +^	9	–	1	11	–	2
Emporia State #	7	–	3	9	–	3
Missouri Western #	7	–	3	8	–	4
Fort Hays State	6	–	4	7	–	4
NW Missouri State	6	–	4	7	–	4
Central Oklahoma	4	–	6	5	–	6
Missouri Southern	4	–	6	5	–	6
Nebraska–Kearney	2	–	8	3	–	8
Washburn	1	–	9	2	–	9
Northeastern State	0	–	10	1	–	10
+ – Conference co-champions; ^ – NCAA Division II playoff participant; # – bowl participant (Emporia State: Heritage Bowl, Missouri Western: Live United Texarkana Bowl); Rankings from AFCA Poll

2023 NCAA Division II Super Region 3 independents football records
	Conf.			Overall
Team	W		L	W		L
Lincoln (MO)		–		0	–	11
Rankings from AFCA Poll

=== Super Region 4 ===
2023 Lone Star Conference football standings
	Conf.			Overall
Team	W		L	W		L
No. 18 UT Permian Basin $^	8	–	0	10	–	2
No. 17 Central Washington ^	7	–	1	9	–	4
Angelo State	6	–	2	7	–	3
Texas A&M–Kingsville	5	–	3	7	–	3
Midwestern State	3	–	5	4	–	6
Eastern New Mexico	2	–	6	5	–	6
West Texas A&M	2	–	6	3	–	7
Western Oregon	2	–	6	3	–	8
Western New Mexico	1	–	7	2	–	8
$ – Conference champion; ^ – NCAA Division II playoff participant; Rankings from AFCA Poll

2023 Northern Sun Intercollegiate Conference football standings
	Conf.			Overall
Team	W		L	W		L
No. 13 Augustana (SD) $^	9	–	1	11	–	2
No. 25 Minnesota Duluth	8	–	2	9	–	2
No. 16 Bemidji State ^	8	–	2	9	–	3
No. 21 Minnesota State ^	8	–	2	9	–	3
Wayne State (NE)	7	–	3	8	–	3
MSU Moorhead	6	–	4	7	–	4
Winona State	5	–	5	5	–	6
Northern State	4	–	6	5	–	6
Sioux Falls	3	–	7	3	–	8
Concordia–St. Paul	2	–	8	3	–	8
SW Minnesota State	2	–	8	2	–	9
Mary	2	–	8	2	–	9
Minot State	1	–	9	1	–	10
$ – Conference champion; ^ – NCAA Division II playoff participant; Rankings from AFCA Poll

2023 Rocky Mountain Athletic Conference football standings
	Conf.			Overall
Team	W		L	W		L
No. 2 Colorado Mines $^	9	–	0	14	–	1
No. 15 Western Colorado ^	8	–	1	10	–	2
CSU Pueblo	7	–	2	8	–	3
Black Hills State	5	–	4	6	–	5
Colorado Mesa	5	–	4	6	–	5
Chadron State	4	–	5	5	–	6
South Dakota Mines	4	–	5	5	–	6
Adams State	2	–	7	3	–	8
New Mexico Highlands	1	–	8	2	–	9
Fort Lewis	0	–	9	0	–	11
$ – Conference champion; ^ – NCAA Division II playoff participant; Rankings from AFCA Poll

== Postseason ==
=== Qualifiers ===
Playoff teams
Super Region	School	Conference	Record	Appearance	Last bid
Super Region 1	Tiffin	G-MAC	11–0	2nd	2019
Super Region 1	Charleston (WV)	Mountain East	9–1	2nd	2015
Super Region 1	Kutztown	PSAC	9–2	6th	2021
Super Region 1	Slippery Rock	PSAC	10–1	11th	2022
Super Region 1	East Stroudsburg	PSAC	9–2	5th	2009
Super Region 1	Virginia Union*	CIAA	10–1	11th	2022
Super Region 1	New Haven	Northeast-10	8–2	9th	2022
Super Region 2	Benedict	SIAC	11–0	2nd	2022
Super Region 2	Delta State	Gulf South	9–1	11th	2022
Super Region 2	Valdosta State	Gulf South	10–1	19th	2021
Super Region 2	Lenoir–Rhyne	SAC	10–1	7th	2021
Super Region 2	Shepherd*	PSAC	9–2	15th	2022
Super Region 2	Limestone	SAC	8–3	2nd	2022
Super Region 2	West Florida	Gulf South	8–3	5th	2022
Super Region 3	Harding	GAC	11–0	6th	2021
Super Region 3	Grand Valley State	GLIAC	9–1	22nd	2022
Super Region 3	Pittsburg State	MIAA	10–1	20th	2022
Super Region 3	Central Missouri	MIAA	10–1	5th	2019
Super Region 3	Henderson State	GAC	9–2	4th	2015
Super Region 3	Indianapolis	GLVC	9–1	8th	2022
Super Region 3	Ferris State	GLIAC	8–2	14th	2022
Super Region 4	Colorado Mines	RMAC	11–0	9th	2022
Super Region 4	Western Colorado	RMAC	10–1	5th	2021
Super Region 4	Texas–Permian Basin	Lone Star	10–1	1st	—
Super Region 4	Augustana (SD)	NSIC	10–1	7th	2021
Super Region 4	Minnesota State	NSIC	9–2	14th	2022
Super Region 4	Bemidji State	NSIC	8–2	3rd	2022
Super Region 4	Central Washington	Lone Star	7–3	7th	2021

* — Indicates a team playing outside of its assigned super region.

=== Bracket ===
==== Super Region 1 ====
First Round; November 18, 2023; Campus sites
East Stroudsburg	14
4	Slippery Rock*	45
3	Kutztown*	38
Virginia Union	15
New Haven	44
2	Charleston (WV)*	52

Second Round; November 25, 2023; Campus sites
1	Tiffin*	35
4	Slippery Rock	45
3	Kutztown	32
2	Charleston (WV)*	31

Quarterfinals; December 2, 2023; Campus sites
4	Slippery Rock*	16
3	Kutztown	28

==== Super Region 2 ====
First Round; November 18, 2023; Campus sites
Shepherd	17
4	Lenoir–Rhyne*	63
3	Valdosta State*	62
Limestone	41
West Florida	14
2	Delta State*	48

Second Round; November 25, 2023; Campus sites
1	Benedict*	25
4	Lenoir–Rhyne	35
3	Valdosta State	38
2	Delta State*	31

Quarterfinals; December 2, 2023; Campus sites
4	Lenoir–Rhyne	35
3	Valdosta State*	7

==== Super Region 3 ====
First Round; November 18, 2023; Campus sites
Henderson State	14
4	Central Missouri*	56
3	Pittsburg State*	35
Indianapolis	14
Ferris State	14
2	Grand Valley State*	21

Second Round; November 25, 2023; Campus sites
1	Harding*	35
4	Central Missouri	34
3	Pittsburg State	21
2	Grand Valley State*	24

Quarterfinals; December 2, 2023; Campus sites
1	Harding*	7
2	Grand Valley State	6

==== Super Region 4 ====
First Round; November 18, 2023; Campus sites
Minnesota State	24
4	Augustana (SD)*	51
3	Texas–Permian Basin*	3
Bemidji State	10
Central Washington	16
2	Western Colorado*	13

Second Round; November 25, 2023; Campus sites
1	Colorado Mines*	56
4	Augustana (SD)	10
Bemidji State*	17
Central Washington	21

Quarterfinals; December 2, 2023; Campus sites
1	Colorado Mines*	38
Central Washington	14

=== Semifinals & Championship ===
Teams were re-seeded prior to semifinals.

Semifinals; December 9, 2023; Hosted by higher seeded team
1	Colorado Mines	35
4	Kutztown	7
3	Lenoir–Rhyne	14
2	Harding	55

Championship; December 16, 2023; McKinney, Texas
1	Colorado Mines	7
2	Harding	38

=== Bowl games ===
There were four bowl games, which featured teams that did not qualify for the Division II postseason tournament.

The schedule included the inaugural edition of the Florida Beach Bowl, contested between teams from the Southern Intercollegiate Athletic Conference (SIAC) and Central Intercollegiate Athletic Association (CIAA), two conferences mostly consisting of historically black colleges and universities (HBCUs).

Date	Time (EST)	Game	Site	Television	Teams	Affiliations	Results
Dec. 1	7:00 p.m.	America's Crossroads Bowl	Hammond Central High School; Hammond, Indiana	No broadcast	McKendree (5–5); Ashland (8–3)	GLVC; GMAC	Ashland 23; McKendree 20
Dec. 2	1:00 p.m.	Live United Bowl	Arkansas High School; Texarkana, Arkansas	No broadcast	Southern Arkansas (9–2); Missouri Western (8–3)	GAC; MIAA	Southern Arkansas 43; Missouri Western 27
Dec. 2	1:00 p.m.	Heritage Bowl	Tiger Stadium; Corsicana, Texas	No broadcast	Southern Nazarene (6–5); Emporia State (8–3)	GAC; MIAA	Emporia State 55; Southern Nazarene 24
Dec. 13	7:30 p.m.	Florida Beach Bowl	DRV PNK Stadium; Fort Lauderdale, Florida	HBCU Go	Johnson C. Smith (7–3); Fort Valley State (7–3)	CIAA; SIAC	Fort Valley State 23; Johnson C. Smith 10

== Coaching changes ==
=== Preseason and in-season ===
This is restricted to coaching changes that took place on or after May 1, 2023, and will include any changes announced after a team's last regularly scheduled games but before its playoff games.

School	Outgoing coach	Date	Reason	Replacement	Previous position
Clark Atlanta	Willie Slater	October 2, 2023	Fired	Richard Moncrief	Clark Atlanta offensive coordinator and quarterbacks coach (2022–2023)
St. Augustine's	Howard Feggins	October 13, 2023	Fired	Jody Owens	St. Augustine's defensive coordinator (2023)

=== End of season ===
This list includes coaching changes announced during the season that did not take effect until the end of the season.

School	Outgoing coach	Date	Reason	Replacement	Previous position
Morehouse	Gerard Wilcher	November 6, 2023	Fired	Terance Mathis	Fellowship Christian (GA) assistant coach (2021)
West Chester	Bill Zwaan	November 6, 2023	Retired	Duke Greco	Delaware Valley head coach (2014–2023)
Northeastern State	J. J. Eckert	November 13, 2023	Contract expired	Darrin Chiaverini	Chaffey College head coach (2023)
Mississippi College	John Bland	November 13, 2023	Resigned	Mike Kershaw	Rice wide receivers coach (2019–2023)
West Georgia	David Dean	November 13, 2023	Resigned	Joel Taylor	Mercer defensive coordinator (2020–2023)
Wingate	Joe Reich	November 14, 2023	Resigned (became school's athletic director)	Rashaan Jordan	Wingate defensive coordinator and linebackers coach (2013–2023)
Hillsdale	Keith Otterbein	November 14, 2023	Retired	Nate Shreffler	Hillsdale offensive coordinator (2011–2023)
UVA Wise	Dane Damron	November 14, 2023	Resigned	Gary Bass	Quincy head coach (2017–2023)
Southwestern Oklahoma State	Ruzell McCoy (interim)	November 16, 2023	Permanent replacement	Andrew Rice	Southern Arkansas offensive coordinator (2022–2023)
Lake Erie	DJ Boldin	November 21, 2023	Resigned	David Price	Tiffin assistant head coach, defensive coordinator, and defensive line coach (2023)
Clark Atlanta	Richard Moncrief (interim)	November 27, 2023	Permanent replacement	Teddy Keaton	Allen head coach (2018–2023)
Allen	Teddy Keaton	November 27, 2023	Hired by Clark Atlanta	Cedric Pearl	Alabama A&M defensive line coach (2022–2023)
William Jewell	Neil Linhart (interim)	November 28, 2023	Permanent replacement	Jason Ambroson	Smithville HS (MO) head coach (2015–2023)
Carson–Newman	Mike Clowney	November 29, 2023	Fired	Ashley Ingram	Navy assistant head coach and offensive line coach (2023)
Pittsburg State	Brian Wright	December 3, 2023	Hired by Northern Arizona	Tom Anthony	Pittsburg State assistant head coach and defensive coordinator (2022)
Benedict	Chennis Berry	December 7, 2023	Hired by South Carolina State	Ron Dickerson Jr.	West Florida offensive coordinator and wide receivers coach (2023)
Tusculum	Jerry Odom	December 8, 2023	Resigned	Billy Taylor	East Tennessee State associate head coach and defensive coordinator (2013–2023)
Midwestern State	Bill Maskill	December 10, 2023	Retired	Rich Renner	Midwestern State defensive coordinator (2008–2023)
Lincoln (MO)	Jermaine Gales	December 11, 2023	Hired as offensive coordinator by Alcorn State	Moses Harper	Nebraska–Kearney wide receivers coach (2023)
Tiffin	Cris Reisert	December 12, 2023	Hired by Gardner–Webb	Brett Ekkens	Saginaw Valley State offensive coordinator and offensive line coach (2022–2023)
Quincy	Gary Bass	December 13, 2023	Hired by UVA Wise	Jason Killday	Truman assistant head coach, offensive coordinator, and quarterbacks coach (2016–2023)
Fairmont State	Jason Woodman	December 19, 2023	Hired by Morehead State	Luke Barker	Charleston (WV) associate head coach and offensive coordinator (2021–2023)
Bluefield State	Tony Coaxum	January 10, 2024	Fired	Davon Morgan	Florida A&M defensive coordinator and defensive backs coach (2022–2023)
Lenoir–Rhyne	Mike Jacobs	January 18, 2024	Hired as head coach by Mercer	Doug Socha	Keiser head coach (2017–2023)
Truman	Gregg Nesbitt	February 9, 2024	Retired	Kellen Nesbitt (full-season interim; named full-time on December 30, 2024)	Truman assistant head coach, defensive coordinator, and special teams coordinator (2016–2023)
Limestone	Mike Furrey	February 29, 2024	Hired as wide receivers coach for South Carolina	Jerricho Cotchery	Limestone assistant head coach and wide receivers coach (2022–2023)

== See also ==
- 2023 NCAA Division I FBS football season
- 2023 NCAA Division I FCS football season
- 2023 NCAA Division III football season
- 2023 NAIA football season
- 2023 U Sports football season
- 2023 junior college football season
