= Willie J. Slater =

American football player, coach, and college athletics administrator

Biographical details
- Born: Coffeeville, Alabama, U.S.

Playing career
- 1974–1977: Livingston
- Position: Quarterback

Coaching career (HC unless noted)
- 1978: Livingston (GA)
- 1979–1980: Jess Lanier HS (AL)
- 1981–1982: T. R. Miller HS (AL)
- 1983–1990: Troy State (OC/RB/QB)
- 1991: Livingston (OC)
- 1992–1999: North Alabama (OC)
- 2000–2003: Jacksonville State (OC)
- 2004–2005: Temple (OC/WR)
- 2006–2021: Tuskegee
- 2022–2023: Clark Atlanta

Administrative career (AD unless noted)
- 2017–2021: Tuskegee

Head coaching record
- Overall: 126–59 (college)
- Bowls: 3–1
- Tournaments: 3–4 (NCAA D-II playoffs)

Accomplishments and honors

Championships
- 5 Black college national (2007–2009, 2015–2016); 7 SIAC (2006–2009, 2012, 2014, 2017); 5 SIAC West Division (2012–2014, 2016–2017)

Awards
- 5× NCAA Div II Assistant Coach of the Year

Willie James Slater is an American football coach and college athletics administrator. He was most recently the head football coach for Clark Atlanta University; a position he held from 2022 to 2023. Slater served as the head football coach at Tuskegee University in Tuskegee, Alabama, from 2006 to 2021. His teams won the Pioneer Bowl in 2006, 2007, and 2009. In 2007, his undefeated squad was named the black small college football national champions and claimed outright or has shared that crown more times. Slater was appointed as athletic director at Tuskegee in 2017. In December 2021, Tuskegee hired Reginald Ruffin from Miles College to succeed Slater as head football coach and athletic director.

== Head coaching record ==
=== College ===
Year	Team	Overall	Conference	Standing	Bowl/playoffs	AFCA^{#}
Tuskegee Golden Tigers (Southern Intercollegiate Athletic Conference) (2006–2021)
2006	Tuskegee	10–2	6–1	T–1st	W Pioneer	
2007	Tuskegee	12–0	7–0	1st	W Pioneer	16
2008	Tuskegee	10–1	9–0	1st		14
2009	Tuskegee	10–2	8–1	1st	W Pioneer	17
2010	Tuskegee	9–2	7–2	T–2nd		
2011	Tuskegee	4–6	4–3	3rd (West)		
2012	Tuskegee	10–2	7–0	T–1st (West)	L Pioneer	23
2013	Tuskegee	8–3	6–1	T–1st (West)	L NCAA Division II First Round	25
2014	Tuskegee	9–3	7–0	1st (West)	L NCAA Division II First Round	25
2015	Tuskegee	10–3	4–1	2nd (West)	L NCAA Division II Quarterfinal	11
2016	Tuskegee	9–3	6–1	1st (West)	L NCAA Division II Second Round	20
2017	Tuskegee	9–2	6–0	1st (West)		
2018	Tuskegee	5–5	3–3	T–2nd (West)		
2019	Tuskegee	5–5	4–2	2nd (West)		
2020–21	No team—COVID-19					
2021	Tuskegee	3–8	2–4	4th (West)		
Tuskegee:		123–47	86–19			
Clark Atlanta Panthers (Southern Intercollegiate Athletic Conference) (2022–2023)
2022	Clark Atlanta	3–7	2–6	6th (East)		
2023	Clark Atlanta	0–5 (Note: Slater was fired with six weeks remaining in the season and Richard Moncrief was named as interim head coach.)	0–4			
Clark Atlanta:		3–12	2–10			
Total:		126–59				
National championship Conference title Conference division title or championship game berth
