= Central High School (St. Joseph, Missouri) =

Location
- 2602 Edmond Street; St. Joseph, Missouri 64501; United States
- 39°45′54″N 94°49′44″W

Information
- Founded: 1895
- School district: St. Joseph School District
- Principal: (vacant)
- Teaching staff: 105.35 (FTE)
- Enrollment: 1,733 (2024–2025)
- Student to teacher ratio: 16.45
- Colors: Blue and white
- Athletics conference: Greater Suburban Kansas City
- Nickname: Indians
- Yearbook: Wakitan
- Website: central.sjsd.k12.mo.us

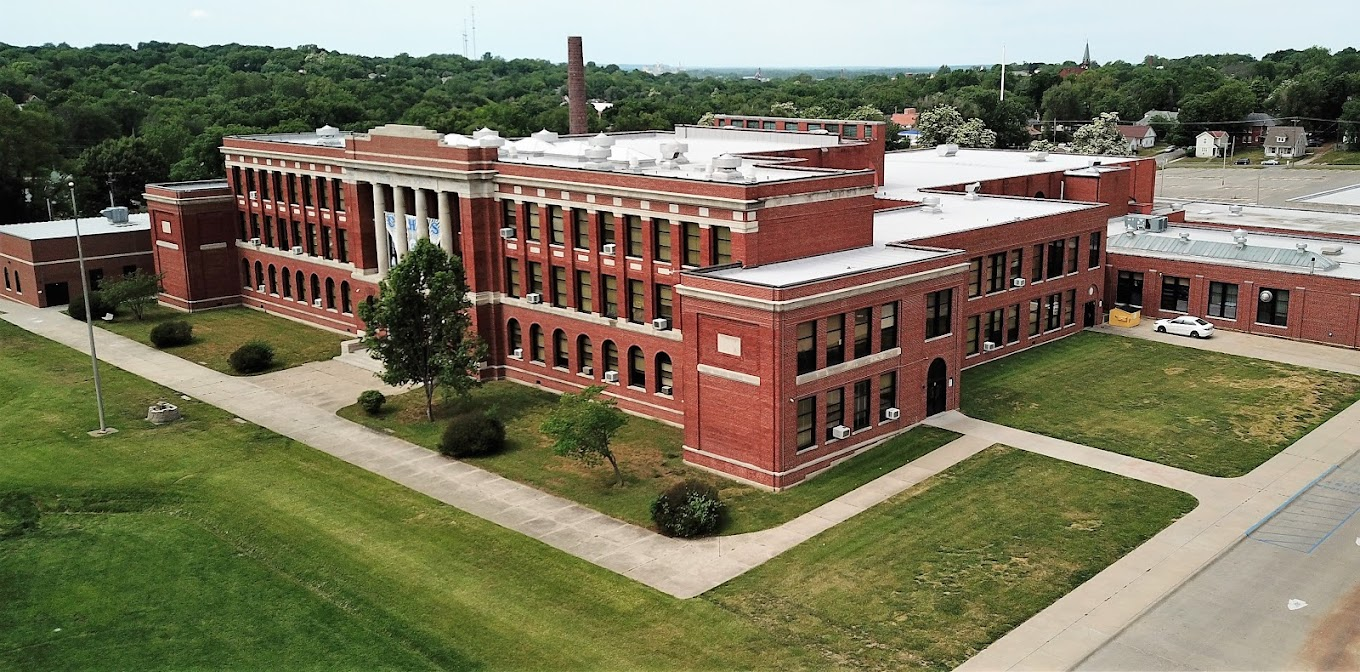
Central High School in 2019.

Central High School is a public secondary school in St. Joseph, Missouri, United States. The school is part of the St. Joseph School District.

== History ==
The school was established in March 1861 as St Joseph High School and closed a few months later due to the Civil War. It re-opened in 1864. On May 8, 1895, the cornerstone was laid for a new building at 13th & Olive Street. The building opened on May 6, 1896. In 1907 a second high school was built in the city thus St. Joseph High School was renamed St. Joseph Central High School. In 1932, a new Central High School was established at 26th & Edmond Street. With a rapidly growing student population, the school expanded in 1961 with a 24-room addition, now called the Sophomore Annex (or Sophomore hallway). In 1968, the 25-room addition now known as the Freshman Annex (or Freshman Building). A bond-renovation project was completed in 2002 that included relocation and centralization of the administrative and counseling offices, as well as the addition of a new media center and library, a gym renovation, and science lab upgrades. In 2013, the Morgan Multipurpose Building was established including with it being locker rooms, a weight room, space for office, training rooms, and more classrooms.

== Notable alumni ==
- Byron Browne, former MLB player (Chicago Cubs, Houston Astros, St. Louis Cardinals, Philadelphia Phillies)
- Dwayne Blakley, former American football tight end (Atlanta Falcons)
- Keith Compton, U.S. Air Force lieutenant general
- Richard B. Frank, lawyer and military historian
- Richard Heinberg, environmental writer
- Edward Wiskoski Professional wrestler
- Noah Cameron, current pitcher for the Kansas City Royals
