= Platte County High School =

Coordinates: 39.359°N 94.771°W

Platte County R-3 High School
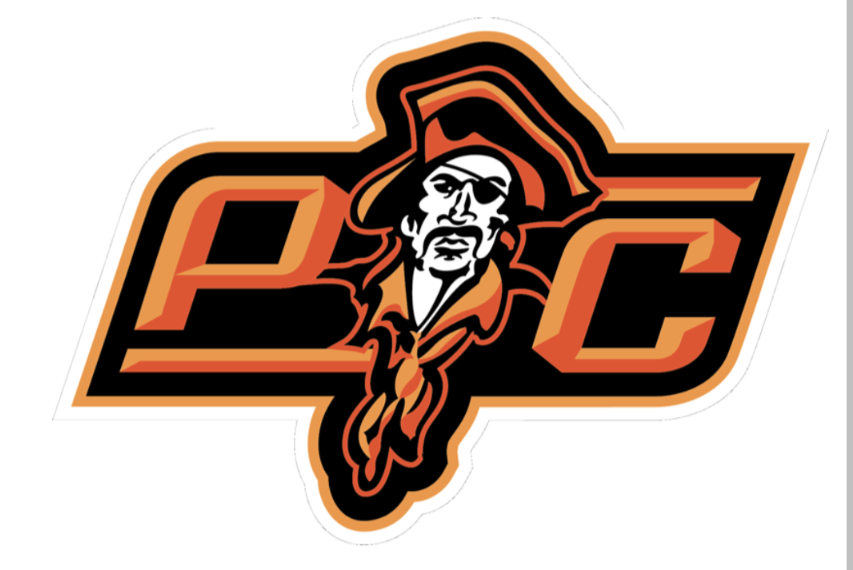

Location
- 1501 Branch Street; Platte City, Missouri 64079-8384; United States

Information
- Type: Public
- Principal: Kiel Giese
- Staff: 82.12 (FTE)
- Grades: 9–12
- Enrollment: 1,342 (2024-2025)
- Student to teacher ratio: 16.20
- Campus: Town
- Colors: Black, orange, and white
- Athletics: Men: Baseball; Basketball; Football; Swimming; Track and Field; Men's Volleyball; Golf; Tennis; Cross Country; Wrestling; Soccer; Women: Basketball; Volleyball; Golf; Cross Country; Tennis; Softball; Soccer; Track and Field; Wrestling
- Athletics conference: Greater Kansas City Suburban
- Mascot: Pirate
- Website: pchs.plattecountyschooldistrict.com

Platte County R-3 High School is located in Platte City, Missouri. It is the sole high school of Platte County School District Number 3. The school district includes portions of Kansas City, as well as Ferrelview, Platte City, Tracy, and the Platte County portion of Smithville.

== Campus ==
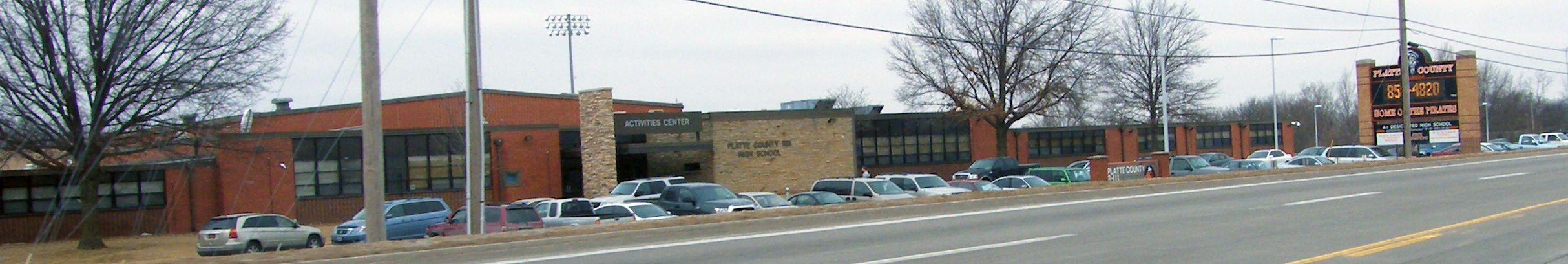
High School campus in 2009.

The building itself has been expanded several times from its original configuration, with additional wings built over the years, including an auditorium and choir/band room. In the summer of 2005, a new middle school was built, and the district's original middle school, which was attached to the high school via a single narrow hallway, was incorporated into the high school. A new main entrance, library, and atrium were built in what was formerly an open courtyard between the high school and middle school. Also in the summer of 2009, there was a new choir room acoustically built for the choir members.

The building has three offices: a technology department, an attendance office, and a central office. The campus itself also has three basketball courts, a field house, an auxiliary gym, a football field (with Fieldturf, and press box), two weight training rooms a theater, two acoustic rooms for choir and band practice, A softball field, a baseball field, and a multi-purpose room mostly used for wrestling. In the fall of 2009 the north annex, the old central office, was added to the campus located to the north of the main high school building. In the fall of 2016 the south annex, formerly Paxton elementary school was added to the campus. The building has expanded once again starting construction in 2021, with a 73 million no-tax increase, opening phase one of two of the new high school. Construction started in 2021 and ended in December 2022 and opened up to students in January. The new building featured a wide variety of new amenities including a brand new field house, auxiliary gym, and brand-new weight room.

== Athletics ==
Fall sports include Girls softball, Girls Golf, Girls Tennis, Girls and Boys Cross Country, Boys Soccer, Girls Volleyball, Boys Swimming and Diving and Football. Winter sports include Boys and Girls Basketball, Girls Swimming and Diving, and Wrestling. Spring sports include Girls Soccer, Boys Tennis, Boys Golf, and Girls and Boys Track and Field. Dance team and Cheerleading run from fall to mid-February. The Platte County High School football team at one point amassed 52 uninterrupted wins in the 2000 (14–0), 2001 (14–0), 2002 (14–0), and 2003 (10–1) seasons. Platte County High School football program earned its fourth state championship in 2024 (2000, 2001, 2002) and finished the 2024 season with a perfect 14–0 record, the only state champion, that year, in Missouri to go undefeated. The baseball team won Missouri state championships in 2002 and 2022.

== Controversies ==
In December 2019, a noose, made out of white shoestrings, was found hanging in a boys bathroom. It followed an incident in 2018 where nooses made out of paper were discovered stuck to the walls of the high school.

== See also ==
- North Platte High School
