= Jason Ambroson =

American football coach (born c. 1970)

Current position
- Title: Head coach
- Team: William Jewell
- Conference: GLVC
- Record: 15–17

Biographical details
- Born: c. 1970 (age 55–56); Leland, Iowa, U.S.
- Education: Iowa State University (1993); University of Kansas

Playing career
- 1989–1993: Iowa State
- Position: Quarterback

Coaching career (HC unless noted)
- 1994: Iowa State (GA)
- 1995: Kansas (GA)
- 1996: Central Missouri (QB)
- 1997–1999: William Jewell (OC/ST/RB)
- 2000: Morningside (OC)
- 2001–2014: Moberly HS (MO)
- 2015–2023: Smithville HS (MO)
- 2024–present: William Jewell

Head coaching record
- Overall: 15–17 (college); 172–92 (high school)

Accomplishments and honors

Awards
- Missouri Football Coaches Association Hall of Fame (2023)

Jason Ambroson (born c. 1970) is an American college football coach. He is the head football coach for William Jewell College, a position he has held since 2024. He was the head football coach for Moberly High School from 2001 to 2014 and Smithville High School from 2015 to 2023. He also coached for Iowa State, Kansas, Central Missouri, and Morningside. He played college football for Iowa State as a quarterback.

== Head coaching record ==
=== College ===
Year	Team	Overall	Conference	Standing	Bowl/playoffs
William Jewell Cardinals (Great Lakes Valley Conference) (2024–present)
2024	William Jewell	5–6	3–5	T–6th	
2025	William Jewell	3–8	1–7	8th	
2026	William Jewell	7–3	6–2	T–2nd	
William Jewell:		15–17	10–14		
Total:		15–17			

=== High school ===
Year	Team	Overall	Conference	Standing	Bowl/playoffs
Moberly Spartans (North Central Missouri Conference) (2001–2014)
2001	Moberly	0–10	0–7	8th	
2002	Moberly	1–9	1–6	7th	
2003	Moberly	6–6	4–3		
2004	Moberly	4–6	1–4	5th	
2005	Moberly	8–4	3–2	3rd	
2006	Moberly	7–4	4–1	1st	
2007	Moberly	11–1	5–0	1st	
2008	Moberly	7–4	3–3	4th	
2009	Moberly	4–6	3–3	3rd	
2010	Moberly	6–5	4–2	3rd	
2011	Moberly	5–7	4–2	3rd	
2012	Moberly	9–3	5–1	2nd	
2013	Moberly	10–1	6–0	1st	
2014	Moberly	4–7	2–4	6th	
Moberly:		82–73	45–37		
Smithville Warriors (Midland Empire Conference) (2015–2017)
2015	Smithville	8–3	6–1	2nd	
2016	Smithville	8–3	5–2	3rd	
2017	Smithville	9–2	6–1	2nd	
Smithville Warriors (Greater Kansas City Suburban Conference) (2018–2023)
2018	Smithville	12–2	5–1	1st	L MSHSAA Class 4 State Semifinals
2019	Smithville	9–2	5–1	2nd	
2020	Smithville	10–3	5–1	2nd	L MSHSAA Class 4 State Semifinals
2021	Smithville	13–0	5–0	1st	W MSHSAA Class 4 State Championship
2022	Smithville	12–2	5–1	2nd	L MSHSAA Class 4 State Semifinals
2023	Smithville	9–2	6–0	1st	
Smithville:		90–19	48–8		
Total:		172–92			
National championship Conference title Conference division title or championship game berth
