= Neil Linhart =

American football coach (born c. 1984)

Current position
- Title: Co-offensive coordinator & quarterbacks coach
- Team: Colorado Mesa
- Conference: RMAC

Biographical details
- Born: c. 1985 (age 40–41); Mokena, Illinois, U.S.
- Education: Millikin University (2007); University of Illinois (2010)

Playing career
- 2003–2006: Millikin
- Position: Wide receiver

Coaching career (HC unless noted)
- 2007: Eureka (WR)
- 2008: Eureka (OC)
- 2009–2011: Bemidji State (WR)
- 2012–2015: Central Lakes (AHC/OC/QB/WR)
- 2016: Presentation (QB/WR/TE)
- 2017: Presentation (OC/QB/WR)
- 2018–2019: South Dakota Mines (OC/WR)
- 2020–2022: William Jewell (OC)
- 2023: William Jewell (interim HC)
- 2024: Colorado Mesa (WR)
- 2025: Colorado Mesa (co-OC/TE)
- 2026–present: Colorado Mesa (co-OC/QB)

Administrative career (AD unless noted)
- 2024: William Jewell (assistant AD)

Head coaching record
- Overall: 2–8

Neil Linhart (born c. 1985) is an American college football coach. He is the co-offensive coordinator and quarterbacks coach for Colorado Mesa University, positions he has held since 2026. He was the interim head football coach for William Jewell College in 2023. He also coached for Eureka, Bemidji State, Central Lakes College, Presentation, and South Dakota Mines. He played college football for Millikin as a wide receiver.

== Head coaching record ==
Year	Team	Overall	Conference	Standing	Bowl/playoffs
William Jewell Cardinals (Great Lakes Valley Conference) (2023)
2023	William Jewell	2–8	1–6	T–7th	
William Jewell:		2–8	1–6		
Total:		2–8			
