= Howard Feggins =

American gridiron football player (born 1965)

Hampton Pirates
- Title: Special teams coordinator & running backs coach

Personal information
- Born: May 6, 1965 (age 61); South Hill, Virginia, U.S.
- Listed height: 5 ft 10 in (1.78 m)
- Listed weight: 190 lb (86 kg)

Career information
- High school: Park View (South Hill, Virginia)
- College: North Carolina
- NFL draft: 1988: undrafted

Career history

Playing
- New England Patriots (1988–1989); New York Giants (1990)*; London Monarchs (1991-1992); Hamilton Tiger-Cats (1992)
- * Offseason or practice squad member only

Coaching
- New York Giants (1991) Minority coaching intern; Colerain HS (OH) (1993) Defensive line coach & running backs coach; Finneytown HS (OH) (1994) Defensive coordinator & defensive backs coach; Wingate (1995–1996) Defensive backs coach & kick returners coach; Miami (OH) (1997–1998) Wide receivers coach; Northwestern (1999–2004) Wide receivers coach; New England Patriots (2003) Minority coaching intern; Eastern Michigan (2004–2006) Offensive coordinator & wide receivers coach; Eastern Michigan (2007) Running backs coach; South Carolina State (2008–2010) Running backs coach & passing game coordinator; Norfolk State (2011) Wide receivers coach; Norfolk State (2012–2013) Offensive coordinator; Warren Central HS (KY) (2014) Head coach; CSU Pueblo (2015–2016) Running backs coach; Western Hills HS (OH) (2017) Assistant coach; Fayetteville State (2018–2022) Offensive coordinator; St. Augustine's (2023) Head coach; Hampton (2024–present) Special teams coordinator & running backs coach

Career NFL statistics
- Interceptions: 1
- Stats at Pro Football Reference

Head coaching record
- Career: 0–6 (.000) (college); 6–5 (.545) (high school)

Howard Anthony Feggins (born May 6, 1965) is an American college football coach and former player. He is the special teams coordinator and running backs coach for Hampton University, a position he has held since 2024. He was the head football coach for St. Augustine's University in Raleigh, North Carolina; a position he has held in 2023. Feggins played professionally as a defensive back. He spent several seasons in the National Football League (NFL), but only played during the 1989 season with the New England Patriots. Feggins played college football at the University of North Carolina at Chapel Hill. As a cornerback and safety for the North Carolina Tar Heels, he totaled 169 career tackles.

== Head coaching record ==
=== College ===
Year	Team	Overall	Conference	Standing	Bowl/playoffs
St. Augustine's Falcons (Central Intercollegiate Athletic Association) (2023)
2023	St. Augustine's	0–6 (Note: Feggins was fired with four weeks remaining in the season and Jody Owens was named as interim head coach.)	0–5		
St. Augustine's:		0–6	0–5		
Total:		0–6			

=== High school ===
Year	Team	Overall	Conference	Standing	Bowl/playoffs
Warren Central Dragons () (2014)
2014	Warren Central	6–5	3–1	2nd	
Warren Central:		6–5	3–1		
Total:		6–5			
