= J. J. Eckert =

American football player and coach

Playing career
- 1994–1997: Northeastern State
- Position(s): Quarterback

Coaching career (HC unless noted)
- 1998–1999: Northeastern State (QB/WR)
- 2000: Kilgore (QB/WR)
- 2001–2004: Kilgore (OC)
- 2005–2006: Garden City
- 2007–2018: Kilgore
- 2019–2023: Northeastern State

Head coaching record
- Overall: 4–40 (college); 85–61 (junior college)
- Bowls: 1–5 (junior college)

Accomplishments and honors

Championships
- 2 SWJCFC (2015, 2018); 3 SWJCFC regular season (2007, 2012, 2018)

Awards
- SWJCFC Coach of the Year (2018)

J. J. Eckert is an American college football coach. He was the head football coach for Northeastern State University from 2019 to 2023. He was previously head coach at Kilgore College in Texas and Garden City Community College in Kansas. Eckert is also the son of long-time Northeastern State head coach Tom Eckert.

== Playing career ==
In high school, Eckert was starting quarterback at Tahlequah High School for two seasons. He was also a Tulsa World All-Stater in 1993.

After a year at the University of Central Arkansas, Eckert transferred to Northeastern State University in 1994 to play quarterback under head coach Tom Eckert, his father. He was a part of the teams that won the NAIA National Championship in 1994 and were National Runner-Ups in 1995.

== Coaching career ==
Eckert began his coaching career as a quarterback and wide receivers coach at Northeastern State in 1998. In 2000, he was hired by Jim Rieves at Kilgore College, a junior college in Kilgore, Texas, for the same position. The following season, he became Kilgore's offensive coordinator.

In 2005, Eckert became the head coach at Garden City Community College in Garden City, Kansas. During his two-year stint there, the Broncbusters won 13 games and made a bowl appearance.

In 2007 Eckert returned to Kilgore as their head coach. Over the next 12 seasons, he led Kilgore to a 72–53 record, two Southwest Junior College Football Conference championships, three regular season conference titles, and five bowl appearances. Eckert was awarded as Conference Coach of the Year in 2018 after a 10-2 championship season.

In December 2018, Eckert returned to Northeastern State as their 20th head football coach.

== Personal life ==
Eckert and his wife, Amanda, have three children. He is a citizen of the Cherokee Nation.

== Head coaching record ==
=== Junior college ===
Year	Team	Overall	Conference	Standing	Bowl/playoffs	NJCAA^{#}
Garden City Broncbusters (Kansas Jayhawk Community College Conference) (2005–2006)
2005	Garden City	7–4	6–1	2nd	L Dixie Rotary Bowl	
2006	Garden City	6–4	4–3	4th		
Garden City:		13–8	10–4			
Kilgore Rangers (Southwest Junior College Football Conference) (2007–2018)
2007	Kilgore	8–4	5–1	1st	L C.H.A.M.P.S. Heart of Texas Bowl	
2008	Kilgore	6–4	5–2	T–2nd		
2009	Kilgore	4–6	3–3	4th		
2010	Kilgore	4–6	3–3	T–3rd		
2011	Kilgore	3–6	2–4	6th		
2012	Kilgore	8–3	5–1	T–1st	L Brazos Valley Bowl	
2013	Kilgore	4–5	3–3	T–3rd		
2014	Kilgore	7–3	4–2	T–2nd		
2015	Kilgore	7–5	3–3	4th	L C.H.A.M.P.S. Heart of Texas Bowl	
2016	Kilgore	6–5	4–3	2nd	L Mississippi Bowl	
2017	Kilgore	5–4	4–3	T–4th		
2018	Kilgore	10–2	6–2	T–1st	W SWJCFC Championship, W C.H.A.M.P.S. Heart of Texas Bowl	4
Kilgore:		72–53	47–30			
Total:		86–61				
National championship Conference title Conference division title or championship game berth

=== College ===
Year	Team	Overall	Conference	Standing	Bowl/playoffs
Northeastern State RiverHawks (Mid-America Intercollegiate Athletics Association) (2019–2023)
2019	Northeastern State	0–11	0–11	12th	
2020–21	Northeastern State	0–1	0–0	N/A	
2021	Northeastern State	2–9	2–9	11th	
2022	Northeastern State	1–10	1–10	11th	
2023	Northeastern State	2–9	1–9	10th	
Northeastern State:		5–40	4–39		
Total:		5–40			
