= Jody Owens =

American football coach (born 1990)

Current position
- Title: Assistant head coach & linebackers coach
- Team: Montana State
- Conference: Big Sky

Biographical details
- Born: September 12, 1990 (age 36); Dallas, Texas, U.S.
- Education: Montana State University (2012); University of Nevada, Reno (2017); University of Washington (2019)

Playing career
- 2008–2012: Montana State
- Position: Linebacker

Coaching career (HC unless noted)
- 2013: Community HS (TX) (assistant)
- 2014: L. D. Bell HS (TX) (assistant)
- 2015: Montana State (LB)
- 2016: Kansas City Chiefs (intern)
- 2016: Nevada (GA)
- 2017–2018: Washington (LB)
- 2019: Chicago Bears (intern)
- 2019: Briar Cliff (DC)
- 2020–2021: Pittsburg State (co-DC/LB)
- 2022: Carolina Panthers (OA)
- 2023: St. Augustine's (DC)
- 2023: St. Augustine's (interim HC/DC)
- 2024: Montana State (S)
- 2025–present: Montana State (AHC/LB)

Head coaching record
- Overall: 0–4

Accomplishments and honors

Awards
- Big Sky Conference Defensive Player of the Year (2012); 2× First Team All-Big Sky (2011–2012); Second Team All-American (2011); First Team All-American (2012)

Jody Deshawn Owens (born September 12, 1990) is an American college football coach. He is the assistant head football coach and linebackers coach for Montana State University, a position he has held since 2025. He was the interim head football coach for St. Augustine's University in 2023. He also coached for Community High School, L. D. Bell High School, Montana State, Nevada, Washington, Briar Cliff, Pittsburg State, and the Kansas City Chiefs, Chicago Bears, and Carolina Panthers of the National Football League (NFL). He played college football for Montana State as a linebacker.

== Head coaching record ==
Year	Team	Overall	Conference	Standing	Bowl/playoffs
St. Augustine's Falcons (Central Intercollegiate Athletic Association) (2023)
2023	St. Augustine's	0–4 (Note: Owens was named interim head coach with four weeks remaining in the season following the firing of Howard Feggins.)	0–4	6th (Southern)	
St. Augustine's:		0–4	0–4		
Total:		0–4			
