= Ruzell McCoy =

American football coach (born c. 1986)

Current position
- Title: Linebackers coach & recruiting coordinator
- Team: Nebraska–Kearney
- Conference: MIAA

Biographical details
- Born: c. 1986 (age 39–40); Frederick, Oklahoma, U.S.
- Education: Southwestern Oklahoma State University (2009, 2010)

Playing career
- 2005–2008: Southwestern Oklahoma State
- Position: Linebacker

Coaching career (HC unless noted)
- 2012–2013: Highland (KS) (DL/LB)
- 2014–2015: Highland (KS) (DC/LB)
- 2016–2017: Coffeyville (DC/LB)
- 2018: McPherson (DC/LB)
- 2019: Ellsworth (DC/LB)
- 2019–2020: Southwestern Oklahoma State (DL)
- 2021–2022: Southwestern Oklahoma State (DC)
- 2023: Southwestern Oklahoma State (interim HC)
- 2024: Madonna (DC/DB)
- 2025–present: Nebraska–Kearney (LB/RC)

Head coaching record
- Overall: 0–11

Accomplishments and honors

Awards
- First Team All-American (2008)

Ruzell McCoy Jr. (born c. 1986) is an American college football coach. He is the linebackers coach and recruiting coordinator for the University of Nebraska at Kearney, positions he has held since 2025. He was the interim head football coach for Southwestern Oklahoma State University in 2023. He previously coached for Highland (KS), Coffeyville, McPherson, Ellsworth, and Madonna. He played college football for Southwestern Oklahoma State as a linebacker.

== Head coaching record ==
Year	Team	Overall	Conference	Standing	Bowl/playoffs
Southwestern Oklahoma State Bulldogs (Great American Conference) (2023)
2023	Southwestern Oklahoma State	0–11	0–11	12th	
Southwestern Oklahoma State:		0–11	0–11		
Total:		0–11			
