= Jalen Mayo =

American football player

No. 2 – Houston Cougars
- Position: Cornerback
- Class: Redshirt Senior

Personal information
- Listed height: 6 ft 2 in (1.88 m)
- Listed weight: 190 lb (86 kg)

Career information
- High school: Phoebus (Hampton, Virginia)
- College: Virginia Union (2022–2024); Stephen F. Austin (2025); Houston (2026–present)

Awards and highlights
- FCS Second-team All-American (2025); First-team All-Southland (2025)
- Stats at ESPN

Jalen Mayo is an American college football cornerback for the Houston Cougars. He previously played for the Virginia Union Panthers and the Stephen F. Austin Lumberjacks.

== Early life ==
Mayo attended Phoebus High School in Hampton, Virginia, where he excelled in football as a wide receiver and defensive back. As a senior in 2021, he earned first-team all-state honors at both positions after tallying 34 receptions for 585 yards and seven touchdowns on offense and seven interceptions and 15 pass breakups on defense. Mayo helped the Phantoms compile a 14–1 record and win the Virginia High School League (VHSL) Class 3 state championship. Mayo returned two interceptions for touchdowns in a 28–7 win over the defending state champions, Hopewell High School, in the regional playoffs. In the state title game the next month, he caught a touchdown in the first quarter before notching an interception in the final minute of a 22–14 win over Liberty Christian Academy, securing the school's eighth state championship in 20 years.

Mayo was an unrated recruit. He received just one college offer from Virginia Union University, a school located about 30 minutes from his home in Hampton with an Division II football program, and signed to play for the Panthers on National Signing Day in February 2022.

== College career ==
As a freshman in 2022, Mayo took a redshirt after suffering an ankle injury and did not play any games. In 2023, he registered 20 tackles, two tackles for loss, three interceptions, and three pass breakups, earning Central Intercollegiate Athletic Association (CIAA) all-rookie accolades. In 2024, Mayo recorded 52 tackles, 3.5 tackles for loss, three interceptions, one forced fumble, and seven pass breakups. He also helped the Panthers win back-to-back CIAA titles.

Mayo transferred to Stephen F. Austin State University to play for the Lumberjacks. In 2025, he posted 48 tackles, 3.5 tackles for loss, four interceptions, nine pass breakups, and one forced fumble, helping the Lumberjacks win the Southland Conference title. Mayo earned first-team all-Southland honors, and was named a second-team FCS All-American by multiple publications. He entered the NCAA transfer portal after the season and was rated as the No. 9 and No. 27 cornerback in the portal by Rivals.com and 247Sports, respectively.

Mayo transferred to the University of Houston during the January 2026 transfer window to play for the Cougars, following his former cornerbacks coach Marcus Trice, who had been hired in the same role with the Cougars a few weeks prior. After a strong performances in the spring and fall camps, Mayo was named a starter at cornerback heading into the 2026 season.
