= Dwayne Blakley =

American football player (born 1979)

No. 85
- Position: Tight end

Personal information
- Born: August 10, 1979 (age 47); St. Joseph, Missouri, U.S.
- Listed height: 6 ft 4 in (1.93 m)
- Listed weight: 257 lb (117 kg)

Career information
- High school: Central (St. Joseph)
- College: Missouri
- NFL draft: 2002: undrafted

Career history
- Kansas City Chiefs (2002–2003)*; Rhein Fire (2003–2004); San Diego Chargers (2003)*; Miami Dolphins (2003)*; Tennessee Titans (2003–2004)*; Atlanta Falcons (2004–2007); Tennessee Titans (2008)
- * Offseason or practice squad member only

Career NFL statistics
- Receptions: 21
- Receiving yards: 189
- Receiving touchdowns: 1
- Stats at Pro Football Reference

Dwayne David Blakley (born August 10, 1979) is an American former professional football player who was a tight end for the Atlanta Falcons of the National Football League (NFL). He played college football for the Missouri Tigers.

== Early life ==
Blakley was born in Saint Joseph, Missouri. He attended Central High School in St. Joseph, and graduated in 1997. Blakley played college football at the University of Missouri.

== Professional career ==
Blakley was signed by the Kansas City Chiefs as an undrafted free agent in 2002. He played for the Atlanta Falcons from 2004 to 2007.
