= Mike Clowney =

American football coach (born c. 1971)

Biographical details
- Born: c. 1971 (age 54–55); Union, South Carolina, U.S.
- Education: Carson–Newman University (1997, 2000, 2015)

Playing career
- 1993–1996: Carson–Newman
- Position: Linebacker

Coaching career (HC unless noted)
- 1998–1999: Carson–Newman (RB)
- 2000–2003: Greenwood HS (SC) (DC/LB)
- 2004–2005: Carson–Newman (RB)
- 2006–2008: Emerald HS (SC)
- 2009–2015: Carson–Newman (DC/LB)
- 2016–2019: Carson–Newman (AHC/RB)
- 2020–2023: Carson–Newman

Head coaching record
- Overall: 13–20 (college); 10–22 (high school)

Accomplishments and honors

Awards
- First Team All-American (1996); SAC Defensive Player of the Year (1996)

Michael Clowney (born c. 1971) is an American college football coach. He was the head football coach for Carson–Newman University from 2020 to 2023. He previously coached for Greenwood High School and Emerald High School. He played college football for Carson–Newman as a linebacker.

== Head coaching record ==
=== College ===
Year	Team	Overall	Conference	Standing	Bowl/playoffs
Carson–Newman Eagles (South Atlantic Conference) (2020–2023)
2020–21	Carson–Newman	1–0	1–0	2nd (Mountain)	
2021	Carson–Newman	1–9	1–7	T–8th	
2022	Carson–Newman	6–5	5–4	3rd (Mountain)	
2023	Carson–Newman	5–6	4–4	3rd (Mountain)	
Carson–Newman:		13–20	10–15		
Total:		13–20			

=== High school ===
Year	Team	Overall	Conference	Standing	Bowl/playoffs
Emerald Vikings () (2006–2008)
2006	Emerald	3–7	2–3	5th	
2007	Emerald	3–7	1–4	5th	
2008	Emerald	4–8	3–3	3rd	
Emerald:		10–22	6–10		
Total:		10–22			
