= Richard Moncrief =

American football coach (born 1971)

Current position
- Title: Head coach
- Team: Heritage School (GA)
- Record: 0–0

Biographical details
- Born: October 19, 1971 (age 55); Montgomery, Alabama, U.S.
- Education: Clemson University (1993)

Playing career
- 1989–1993: Clemson
- Position: Quarterback

Coaching career (HC unless noted)
- 1997–2000: Sidney Lanier HS (AL) (OC)
- 2001–2002: UAB (WR)
- 2003–2005: Sidney Lanier HS (AL)
- 2006: Selma HS (AL) (OC/QB)
- 2007–2008: Alabama State (QB)
- 2008: Alabama State (interim OC/QB)
- 2009–2012: Alabama State (QB)
- 2013–2014: Pace (QB/WR)
- 2015–2018: Clark Atlanta (OC/QB)
- 2019–2021: Alabama State (QB)
- 2022–2023: Clark Atlanta (OC/QB)
- 2023: Clark Atlanta (interim HC/OC/QB)
- 2024–present: Heritage School (GA)

Administrative career (AD unless noted)
- 2003–2005: Sidney Lanier HS (AL)

Head coaching record
- Overall: 0–5 (college); 6–21 (high school)

Richard D. Moncrief (born October 17, 1971) is an American high school football coach. He was the head football coach for The Heritage School, a position he held in 2024. He was the interim head football coach for Clark Atlanta University for 2023. He was the head football coach for Sidney Lanier High School from 2003 to 2005. He also coached for UAB, Selma High School, Alabama State, and Pace. He played college football as a quarterback for Clemson.

== Head coaching record ==
=== College ===
Year	Team	Overall	Conference	Standing	Bowl/playoffs
Clark Atlanta Panthers (Southern Intercollegiate Athletic Conference) (2023)
2023	Clark Atlanta	0–5 (Note: Moncrief was named interim head coach with six weeks remaining in the season following the firing of Willie J. Slater.)	0–4	13th	
Clark Atlanta:		0–5	0–4		
Total:		0–5			

=== High school ===
Year	Team	Overall	Conference	Standing	Bowl/playoffs
Sidney Lanier Poets () (2003–2005)
2003	Sidney Lanier	2–7	1–4		
2004	Sidney Lanier	4–5	2–3		
2005	Sidney Lanier	0–9	0–5		
Sidney Lanier:		6–21	3–12		
Heritage School Hawks () (2024–present)
2024	Heritage School	0–0	0–0		
Heritage School:		0–0	0–0		
Total:		6–21			
