= Rashaan Jordan =

American football coach (born c. 1971)

Current position
- Title: Head coach
- Team: Wingate
- Conference: SAC
- Record: 18–5

Biographical details
- Born: c. 1971 (age 54–55)

Playing career
- 1990–1993: Alfred
- Position: Halfback

Coaching career (HC unless noted)
- 1994: Alfred (RB)
- 1995–1998: Buffalo (DB)
- 1999–2000: Buffalo (OLB)
- 2001–2007: Wingate (AHC/DC/LB)
- 2008–2010: Cornell (LB)
- 2011–2012: Brockport (DC)
- 2013–2023: Wingate (DC)
- 2024–present: Wingate

Head coaching record
- Overall: 18–5
- Tournaments: 0–2 (NCAA D-II playoffs)

Accomplishments and honors

Championships
- 1 SAC (2024); 1 SAC Piedmont Division (2024)

Rashaan M. Jordan (born c. 1971) is an American college football coach. He is the head football coach for Wingate University, a position he has held since 2024. He also coached for Alfred, Buffalo, Cornell, and Brockport. He played college football for Alfred as a halfback.

== Head coaching record ==
Year	Team	Overall	Conference	Standing	Bowl/playoffs	AFCA^{#}	D2^{°}
Wingate Bulldogs (South Atlantic Conference) (2024–present)
2024	Wingate	9–2	7–1	1st (Piedmont)	L NCAA Division II First Round	21	22
2025	Wingate	9–3	7–2	2nd	L NCAA Division II First Round		
2026	Wingate	0–0	0–0				
Wingate:		18–5	14–3				
Total:		18–5					
National championship Conference title Conference division title or championship game berth
