= Greater Kansas City Suburban Conference =

High school athletic conference in metropolitan Kansas City, Missouri, United States

Greater Kansas City Suburban Conference (GKCSC)
- Association: MSHSAA
- No. of teams: 28
- Region: Greater Kansas City, Missouri
- Website: gkcscathletics.org

The Greater Kansas City Suburban Conference (GKCSC) is a high school athletic conference comprising large to mid-size high schools located in the greater Kansas City, Missouri metro area. The conference members are located in Buchanan, Cass, Clay, Jackson, and Platte counties.

== Member schools ==
The GKCSC is divided into sub-conferences, based on school size, and is re-structured on a regular basis to account for changes in enrollment. As of the 2024–25 school year, there are four conferences, with gold being the largest schools, and red, white and blue conferences in descending order of enrollment

=== Gold Division ===
School	Nickname	Colors	City	County	Type	9–12 Enrollment (2024)	Primary MSHSAA Classification
Blue Springs	Wildcats		Blue Springs	Jackson	Public	2,383	Class 5/6
Blue Springs South	Jaguars		Blue Springs	Jackson	Public	2,261	Class 5/6
Lee's Summit West	Titans		Lee's Summit	Jackson	Public	1,992	Class 5/6
Raymore-Peculiar	Panthers		Peculiar	Cass	Public	2,091	Class 5/6
Liberty North	Eagles		Liberty	Clay	Public	2,330	Class 5/6
Lee's Summit	Tigers		Lee's Summit	Jackson	Public	1,920	Class 5/6
Lee's Summit North	Broncos		Lee's Summit	Jackson	Public	2,009	Class 5/6
Staley	Falcons		Kansas City	Clay	Public	1,897	Class 5/6

=== Red Division ===
School	Nickname	Colors	City	County	Type	9–12 Enrollment (2024)	Primary MSHSAA Classification
Liberty	Blue Jays		Liberty	Clay	Public	1,908	Class 5/6
Park Hill	Trojans		Kansas City	Platte	Public	1,857	Class 5/6
Park Hill South	Panthers		Riverside	Platte	Public	1,860	Class 5/6
North Kansas City	Hornets		North Kansas City	Clay	Public	1,640	Class 5/6
Oak Park	Northmen		Kansas City	Clay	Public	1,756	Class 5/6
Central	Indians		St. Joseph	Buchanan	Public	1,728	Class 5/6

=== White Division ===
School	Nickname	Colors	City	County	Type	9–12 Enrollment (2024)	Primary MSHSAA Classification
Belton	Pirates		Belton	Cass	Public	1,374	Class 5
Grain Valley	Eagles		Grain Valley	Jackson	Public	1,438	Class 5
Platte County	Pirates		Platte City	Platte	Public	1,330	Class 5
Raytown	Blue Jays		Raytown	Jackson	Public	1,365	Class 5
William Chrisman	Bears		Independence	Jackson	Public	1,406	Class 5
Ruskin	Golden Eagles		Kansas City	Jackson	Public	1,273	Class 4
Fort Osage	Indians		Independence	Jackson	Public	1,442	Class 5
Truman	Patriots		Independence	Jackson	Public	1,662	Class 5

=== Blue Division ===
School	Nickname	Colors	City	County	Type	9–12 Enrollment (2024)	Primary MSHSAA Classification
Kearney	Bulldogs		Kearney	Clay	Public	824	Class 4
Raytown South	Cardinals		Raytown	Jackson	Public	1,185	Class 4
Smithville	Warriors		Smithville	Clay	Public	906	Class 4
Winnetonka	Griffins		Kansas City	Clay	Public	1,284	Class 5
Grandview	Bulldogs		Grandview	Jackson	Public	1,122	Class 4
Excelsior Springs	Tigers		Excelsior Springs	Clay	Public	787	Class 4
