= David Price (American football) =

American football coach (born c. 1984)

Current position
- Title: Head coach
- Team: Lake Erie
- Conference: G-MAC
- Record: 4–18

Biographical details
- Born: c. 1984 (age 41–42); Charlottesville, Virginia, U.S.
- Education: University of Akron (2008)

Coaching career (HC unless noted)
- 2010–2012: Hiram (DL)
- 2013: Hiram (OLB)
- 2014–2015: Hiram (AHC/DC/DL)
- 2016–2017: Ohio Northern (DL)
- 2018: Wheeling (co-DC/ST/DL)
- 2019–2022: Tiffin (AHC/DL)
- 2023: Tiffin (AHC/DC/DL)
- 2024–present: Lake Erie

Head coaching record
- Overall: 4–18

David Price (born c. 1984) is an American college football coach. He is the head football coach for Lake Erie College, a position he has held since 2024. He also coached for Hiram, Ohio Northern, Wheeling, and Tiffin.

== Head coaching record ==
Year	Team	Overall	Conference	Standing	Bowl/playoffs
Lake Erie Storm (Great Midwest Athletic Conference) (2024–present)
2024	Lake Erie	2–9	1–8	T–9th	
2025	Lake Erie	2–9	2–7	8th	
Lake Erie:		4–18	3–15		
Total:		4–18			
