= Alumni Memorial Stadium (Livingstone) =

Stadium in Salisbury, North Carolina

- Interactive map of Alumni Memorial Stadium
- Full name: Alumni Memorial Stadium
- Location: Salisbury, North Carolina
- Coordinates: 35°40′14″N 80°29′13″W
- Owner: Livingstone College
- Capacity: 6,000

Tenant
- Livingstone College Blue Bears (NCAA Div II) CIAA

Alumni Memorial Stadium is a 6,000-seat college football stadium located in Salisbury, North Carolina. The Stadium is home to the Blue Bears of Livingstone College. They compete in the National Collegiate Athletic Association (NCAA) Division II Central Intercollegiate Athletic Association (CIAA).
