= List of earthquakes in Texas =

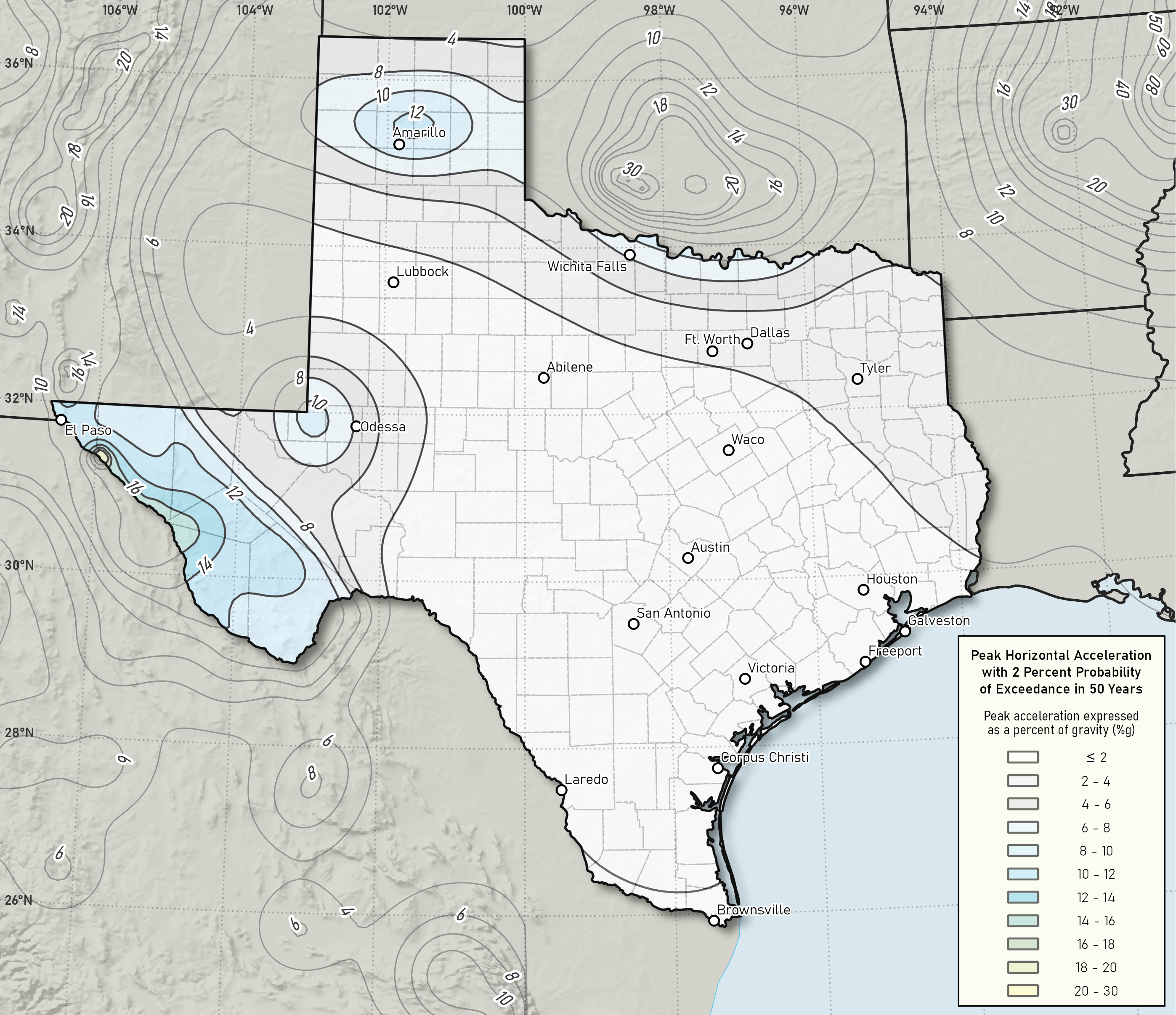
Map of seismic hazard in Texas as of 2014, as determined using the peak ground acceleration with 2% probability of exceedance in 50 years

Earthquakes intense enough to be perceptible occur annually in the U.S. state of Texas. Most earthquakes in the state have been small or have produced minimal impacts. No earthquake-related fatalities have been reported in the state, though one earthquake in Texas caused a death in the neighboring Mexican state of Chihuahua in 1923. The earliest recorded earthquake in Texas occurred near Seguin and New Braunfels on February 13, 1847. Information on the intensities of early Texas earthquakes mainly arose from reports of personal experiences; more seismograph stations were installed in Texas after around 1970. In the 20th century, over 100 earthquakes strong enough to be felt occurred in the state, with epicenters in 40 Texas counties. While many earthquakes in Texas have natural origins, many have been induced from the waste disposal of petroleum extraction, previously believed to be the byproduct of hydraulic fracturing, beginning with the Texas oil boom of the early 20th century. The average number of earthquakes per year with magnitudes greater than 3 increased from roughly 2 to 12 between 2008 and 2016.

The regions within the state with the greatest seismic hazard include West Texas, the Texas Panhandle, North Texas, and South Central Texas. Among these areas, West Texas experiences the strongest and most frequent earthquakes, with El Paso featuring the greatest risk from earthquakes among sizable urban areas in Texas. There are several geologic features in West Texas of interest to seismology, including the Central Basin Platform, the Hueco Bolson, and the Marathon Uplift. Several faultlines are also located in West Texas. The strongest and most destructive earthquake in state history was the 1931 Valentine earthquake, which had an estimated magnitude of m_{b} 5.6–6.4. The second strongest earthquake in Texas history also occurred in West Texas, registering as a magnitude 5.7 tremor near Alpine in 1995. A 2021 study concluded that most seismic activity in West Texas since 2000 resulted from increased wastewater disposal injected at depths deeper than 1.5 km (0.9 mi).

The Texas Panhandle exhibits the second highest seismic risk among regions in the state. The earthquakes in this area primarily occur on buried faults between the Amarillo Uplift and the Anadarko Basin. An earthquake with a magnitude of 5.5–6.0 is expected to occur every 50–100 years in the Texas Panhandle, while an earthquake with a magnitude greater than 6.0 is expected to occur every 300 years. The strongest earthquake in this region was a magnitude 5.4 earthquake that occurred in 1925. Some of the seismic activity in the Texas Panhandle may be caused or influenced by the extraction of petroleum. The northern and northeastern parts of Texas, including the Dallas–Fort Worth metroplex, are another region of seismic risk. Though the area does experience some minor earthquakes, including induced earthquakes naturally occurring tremors potentially along buried faults, shaking from distant earthquakes presents the primary seismic hazard for the region. Some earthquakes of mostly minor strength also occur in South Central Texas and the Texas Coastal Plain. Some of these earthquakes may be associated with geological features produced by the Ouachita orogeny, and many have been attributed to petroleum production.

== Notable earthquakes ==
Earthquakes in Texas (magnitude 4.5+)

| Date and time (UTC) | Location | Epicenter | Mag. | MMI | Depth | Notes | Casualties | | Ref |
| Date and time (UTC) | Location | Epicenter | Mag. | MMI | Depth | Notes | Dead | Injured | Ref |
|---|---|---|---|---|---|---|---|---|---|
| August 16, 1931; 11:40:22 | Presidio County | 30.502°N 104.575°W | 5.8 mb_{Lg} | MMI VIII (Severe) | 1.0 km (0.62 mi) | All buildings in Valentine aside from wood-frame houses were damaged. Property damage was reported in Brewster, Culberson, Jeff Davis, and Presidio counties with landslides triggered as far as the Big Bend of Texas. | — | — | |
| April 14, 1995; 00:32:56 | Brewster County | 30.385°N 103.347°W | 5.7 M_{w} | MMI VII (Very strong) | 17.8 km (11.1 mi) | Slight damage occurred in Alpine and Fort Davis. Two people suffered minor injuries in Brewster County. Shaking was felt as far east as the Dallas–Fort Worth metroplex and San Antonio. | — | 2 | |
| May 4, 2025; 01:47:05 | Culberson County | 31.647°N 104.458°W | 5.4 M_{L} | MMI VII (Very strong) | 7.5 km (4.7 mi) | | — | — | |
| November 16, 2022; 21:32:44 | Reeves County | 31.637°N 103.999°W | 5.4 M_{L} | MMI VII (Very strong) | 6.9 km (4.3 mi) | Possibly the mainshock of a sequence of 881 earthquakes. | — | — | |
| November 8, 2023; 10:27:49 | Reeves County | 31.622°N 103.982°W | 5.2 M_{L} | MMI VII (Very strong) | 7.4 km (4.6 mi) | Possibly the mainshock of a sequence of 278 earthquakes. | — | — | |
| December 16, 2022; 23:35:27 | Martin County | 32.191°N 102.141°W | 5.2 M_{L} | MMI VI (Strong) | 8.2 km (5.1 mi) | | — | — | |
| July 26, 2024; 14:28:29 | Fisher County | 32.764°N 100.659°W | 5.1 M_{L} | MMI VI (Strong) | 3.2 km (2.0 mi) | Possibly the mainshock of a sequence of 69 earthquakes. | — | — | |
| September 17, 2024; 00:49:42 | Martin County | 32.411°N 102.059°W | 5.1 M_{L} | MMI V (Moderate) | 7.9 km (4.9 mi) | Possibly the mainshock of a sequence of 50 earthquakes. | — | — | |
| July 23, 2026; 10:21:43 | Roberts County | 35.902°N 100.976°W | 5.0 M_{L} | MMI VI (Strong) | 5.7 km (3.5 mi) | | — | — | |
| February 15, 2025; 05:23:21 | Culberson County | 31.661°N 104.180°W | 5.0 M_{L} | MMI VI (Strong) | 6.6 km (4.1 mi) | | — | — | |
| March 26, 2020; 15:16:27 | Reeves County | 31.717°N 104.042°W | 5.0 M_{ww} | MMI V (Moderate) | 9.5 km (5.9 mi) | Research published in Geophysical Research Letters in December 2020 concluded that stress introduced by wastewater injection likely triggered the earthquake. | — | — | |
| July 30, 1925; 12:17:00 | Carson County | 35.400°N 101.300°W | 4.9 M_{fa} | MMI VI (Strong) | — | The earthquake was the strongest on record in the Texas Panhandle and caused minor damage. | — | — | |
| July 23, 2024; 03:38:42 | Fisher County | 32.766°N 100.659°W | 4.9 M_{L} | MMI V (Moderate) | 3.2 km (2.0 mi) | | — | — | |
| July 21, 2022; 13:35:58 | Culberson County | 31.680°N 104.421°W | 4.9 M_{L} | MMI V (Moderate) | 5.9 km (3.7 mi) | | — | — | |
| February 28, 2025; 19:33:24 | Martin County | 32.370°N 101.926°W | 4.8 M_{L} | MMI VI (Strong) | 6.8 km (4.2 mi) | | — | — | |
| October 20, 2011; 12:24:41 | Karnes County | 28.865°N 98.079°W | 4.8 M_{wr} | MMI VI (Strong) | 5.0 km (3.1 mi) | Felt throughout South Central Texas and South Texas. | — | — | |
| May 17, 2012; 08:12:00 | Shelby County | 31.926°N 94.369°W | 4.8 M_{wr} | MMI V (Moderate) | 5.0 km (3.1 mi) | | — | — | |
| August 1, 1975; 07:27:57 | Reeves County | 31.425°N 104.012°W | 4.8 m_{b} | — | 5.0 km (3.1 mi) | | — | — | |
| February 17, 2024; 06:32:54 | Karnes County | 28.954°N 98.001°W | 4.7 M_{L} | MMI VI (Strong) | 6.8 km (4.2 mi) | | — | — | |
| February 16, 2023; 10:29:04 | Scurry County | 32.746°N 100.659°W | 4.7 M_{L} | MMI V (Moderate) | 7.8 km (4.8 mi) | | — | — | |
| November 24, 2022; 19:19:28 | Reeves County | 31.627°N 104.003°W | 4.7 M_{L} | MMI V (Moderate) | 8.5 km (5.3 mi) | | — | — | |
| February 18, 2025; 12:16:28 | Culberson County | 31.722°N 104.474°W | 4.6 M_{L} | MMI V (Moderate) | 6.5 km (4.0 mi) | | — | — | |
| June 1, 2022; 15:46:10 | Culberson County | 31.715°N 104.551°W | 4.6 M_{L} | MMI V (Moderate) | 6.2 km (3.9 mi) | | — | — | |
| March 25, 2022; 03:01:58 | Culberson County | 31.669°N 104.420°W | 4.6 M_{L} | MMI V (Moderate) | 6.8 km (4.2 mi) | | — | — | |
| December 28, 2021; 01:55:43 | Martin County | 32.286°N 101.774°W | 4.6 M_{L} | MMI V (Moderate) | 8.4 km (5.2 mi) | | — | — | |
| March 12, 1948; 04:29:06 | Dallam County | 36.221°N 102.478°W | 4.5 M_{fa} | MMI VI (Strong) | 5.0 km (3.1 mi) | Minor damage was reported in the Texas Panhandle. | — | — | |
| January 30, 2025; 03:26:38 | Karnes County | 29.078°N 97.845°W | 4.5 M_{L} | MMI V (Moderate) | 3.7 km (2.3 mi) | | — | — | |
| July 27, 2024; 21:08:31 | Scurry County | 32.744°N 100.696°W | 4.5 M_{L} | MMI V (Moderate) | 3.4 km (2.1 mi) | | — | — | |
| November 24, 2022; 19:14:19 | Reeves County | 31.634°N 103.988°W | 4.5 M_{L} | MMI V (Moderate) | 7.4 km (4.6 mi) | | — | — | |
| August 11, 2022; 07:17:16 | Culberson County | 31.683°N 104.425°W | 4.5 M_{L} | MMI V (Moderate) | 6.6 km (4.1 mi) | | — | — | |
| March 17, 2021; 04:19:28 | Culberson County | 31.654°N 104.357°W | 4.5 M_{L} | MMI V (Moderate) | 6.2 km (3.9 mi) | | — | — | |
| February 15, 1974; 13:33:49 | Ochiltree County | 36.500°N 100.693°W | 4.5 m_{b} | MMI V (Moderate) | 24.0 km (14.9 mi) | Damage to the plaster walls of buildings occurred in Oklahoma and Kansas. | — | — | |
