= 2026 Eastern New Mexico Greyhounds football team =

American college football season

2026 Eastern New Mexico Greyhounds football
- Conference: Lone Star Conference
- Record: 0–11 (0–9 LSC)
- Head coach: Art Briles (1st season)
- Offensive coordinator: Cameron Nellor (1st season)
- Offensive scheme: Veer and shoot
- Defensive coordinator: Jeff Hulme (1st season)
- Base defense: Multiple 4–2–5
- Home stadium: Steve Loy Family Foundation Stadium

2026 Lone Star Conference football standings
	Conf.			Overall
Team	W		L	W		L
No. 7 Central Washington $^	9	–	0	9	–	2
No. 16 Midwestern State ^	8	–	1	9	–	2
Texas A&M–Kingsville	6	–	3	6	–	5
Western Oregon	5	–	4	7	–	4
UT Permian Basin	5	–	4	6	–	5
Angelo State	5	–	4	5	–	6
West Texas A&M	4	–	5	4	–	7
Western New Mexico	2	–	7	3	–	8
Sul Ross	1	–	8	2	–	9
Eastern New Mexico	0	–	9	0	–	11
$ – Conference champion; ^ – NCAA Division II playoff participant; As of November 18, 2026; Rankings from AFCA poll

The 2026 Eastern New Mexico Greyhounds football team represented Eastern New Mexico University (ENMU) during the 2026 NCAA Division II football season as a member of the Lone Star Conference. The Greyhounds played home games at the Steve Loy Family Foundation Stadium in Portales, New Mexico and were led by first-year head coach Art Briles.

== Offseason ==
=== Coaching changes ===
On November 18, 2025, Kelley Lee was fired as the Greyhounds' head coach, finishing his tenure with an overall record of 32–34 through six seasons. Six days later, November 24, Art Briles was hired as the Greyhounds' new head coach. The hiring of Briles caught national attention, as he had not coached at the college level following Baylor's 2015 season due to a university-wide sexual assault scandal involving several football players. In 2021, an NCAA infractions panel ruled that Briles was not guilty of any NCAA violations, but also concluded that he "failed to meet even the most basic expectations of how a person should react to the kind of conduct at issue in this case."

== LSC media poll ==
The Lone Star Conference released its preseason prediction poll on July 23, 2026. The Greyhounds were predicted to finish 7th, but also received one first-place vote.

== Schedule ==
Date	Time	Opponent	Site	Result	Attendance
August 27	6:00 p.m.	at New Mexico Highlands*	Sanchez Family Stadium; Las Vegas, NM	L 34–35	2,545
September 5	2:00 p.m.	Colorado Mesa*	Steve Loy Family Foundation Stadium; Portales, NM	L 23–42	N/A
September 19	6:00 p.m.	at Texas A&M–Kingsville	Javelina Stadium; Kingsville, TX	L 22–56	8,000
September 26	2:00 p.m.	UT Permian Basin	Steve Loy Family Foundation Stadium; Portales, NM	L 10–56	N/A
October 3	6:00 p.m.	at Sul Ross	Jackson Field; Alpine, TX	L 43–56	N/A
October 10	2:00 p.m.	at Western New Mexico	Altamirano Stadium; Silver City, NM	L 55–61	831
October 17	3:00 p.m.	West Texas A&M^{†}	Steve Loy Family Foundation Stadium; Portales, NM (Wagon Wheel)	L 27–41	N/A
October 24	1:05 p.m.	at Western Oregon	McArthur Field; Monmouth, OR	L 35–50	1,327
October 31	2:00 p.m.	No. 12 Central Washington	Steve Loy Family Foundation Stadium; Portales, NM	L 20–49	1,580
November 7	5:00 p.m.	at Angelo State	LeGrand Sports Complex; San Angelo, TX	L 7–20	303
November 14	2:00 p.m.	No. 19 Midwestern State	Steve Loy Family Foundation Stadium; Portales, NM	L 32–57	750
*Non-conference game; ^{†}Homecoming; Rankings from AFCA Poll released prior to the game; All times are in Mountain time

== Game summaries ==
=== At New Mexico Highlands ===
Eastern New Mexico Greyhounds at New Mexico Highlands Cowboys – Game summary

Quarter	1	2	3	4	Total
Greyhounds	7	14	0	13	34
Cowboys	7	14	7	7	35

at Sanchez Family Stadium, Las Vegas, New Mexico

- Date: August 27
- Game time: 6:00 p.m. MDT
- Game weather: Sunny
- Game attendance: 2,545
- Referee: Jeff Bloszies
- Box score, Recap

Game information
First quarter
- NMH – Giovanni Ribalta 14-yard pass from Kadyn Parr (Daniel Estrada kick), 12:39. Cowboys 7–0. Drive: 4 plays, 39 yards, 2:00.
- ENM – Trei Kibbles 1-yard run (Clayton Vincent kick), 5:46. Tied 7–7. Drive: 8 plays, 55 yards, 4:03.

Second quarter

- NMH – Ashton Bradford 5-yard run (Daniel Estrada kick), 14:53. Cowboys 14–7. Drive: 9 plays, 78 yards, 5:48.
- ENM – Lake Bennett 20-yard run (Clayton Vincent kick), 9:36. Tied 14–14. Drive: 15 plays, 75 yards, 5:17.
- NMH – Ashton Bradford 51-yard pass from Kadyn Parr (Daniel Estrada kick), 8:06. Cowboys 21–14. Drive: 3 plays, 65 yards, 1:30.
- ENM – Jose Trevino 9-yard pass from Lake Bennett (Clayton Vincent kick), 1:34. Tied 21–21. Drive: 9 plays, 75 yards, 2:39.

Third quarter

- NMH – Kadyn Parr 13-yard run (Daniel Estrada kick), 5:51. Cowboys 28–21. Drive: 9 plays, 65 yards, 5:45.

Fourth quarter

- ENM – Emeka Megwa 31-yard run (Clayton Vincent kick), 14:52. Tied 28–28. Drive: 4 plays, 57 yards, 0:47.
- NMH – Kerya Powell 3-yard pass from Kadyn Parr (Daniel Estrada kick), 6:27. Cowboys 35–28. Drive: 13 plays, 85 yards, 8:19.
- ENM – Jose Trevino 6-yard pass from Clifton Cooper (run failed), 1:34. Cowboys 35–34. Drive: 8 plays, 65 yards, 1:20.

Statistics	ENM	NMH
First downs	20	24
Total yards	428	460
Rushing yards	220	236
Passing yards	208	224
Passing: comp–att–int	20–40–2	14–20–1
Turnovers	2	1
Time of possession	22:34	37:26

Team	Category	Player	Statistics
Eastern New Mexico	Passing	Jake South	11/18, 148 yards, INT
Eastern New Mexico	Rushing	Clifton Cooper	7 rushes, 56 yards
Eastern New Mexico	Receiving	Darwin Parker	3 receptions, 64 yards
New Mexico Highlands	Passing	Kadyn Parr	14/20, 224 yards, 3 TD, INT
New Mexico Highlands	Rushing	Ashton Bradford	13 rushes, 109 yards, TD
New Mexico Highlands	Receiving	Ashton Bradford	2 receptions, 66 yards, TD

=== Colorado Mesa ===
Colorado Mesa Mavericks at Eastern New Mexico Greyhounds – Game summary

Quarter	1	2	3	4	Total
Mavericks	7	14	14	7	42
Greyhounds	6	3	0	14	23

at Steve Loy Family Foundation Stadium, Portales, New Mexico

- Date: September 5
- Game time: 2:00 p.m. MDT
- Game weather: Sunny, 94 °F (34 °C)
- Referee: Tracy Hernandez
- Box score, Recap

Game information
First quarter
- ENM – Darwin Parker 46-yard pass from Clifton Cooper (kick failed), 13:59. Greyhounds 6–0. Drive: 4 plays, 65 yards, 0:57.
- CM – Trek Keyworth 48-yard pass from Liu Aumavae (Kale Purvis kick), 3:39. Mavericks 7–6. Drive: 6 plays, 80 yards, 3:01.

Second quarter

- ENM – Clayton Vincent 29-yard field goal, 13:53. Greyhounds 9–7. Drive: 14 plays, 69 yards, 4:46.
- CM – Jalen Hankins 28-yard run (Kale Purvis kick), 11:09. Mavericks 14–9. Drive: 5 plays, 75 yards, 2:44.
- CM – Ky Oday 13-yard pass from Liu Aumavae (Kale Purvis kick), 4:42. Mavericks 21–9. Drive: 11 plays, 55 yards, 6:03.

Third quarter

- CM – Ky Oday 54-yard pass from Liu Aumavae (Kale Purvis kick), 10:45. Mavericks 28–9. Drive: 8 plays, 75 yards, 4:15.
- CM – Bronco Hartson 11-yard run (Kale Purvis kick), 1:43. Mavericks 35–9. Drive: 1 play, 11 yards, 0:02.

Fourth quarter

- CM – Bronco Hartson 2-yard run (Kale Purvis kick), 13:22. Mavericks 42–9. Drive: 5 plays, 49 yards, 1:43.
- ENM – Jose Trevino 8-yard run (Kaden Dow kick), 8:47. Mavericks 42–16. Drive: 13 plays, 80 yards, 4:29.
- ENM – Trei Kibbles 41-yard pass from Jake South (Kaden Dow kick), 3:39. Mavericks 42–23. Drive: 5 plays, 77 yards, 1:55.

Statistics	CM	ENM
First downs	27	22
Total yards	412	533
Rushing yards	188	167
Passing yards	224	366
Passing: comp–att–int	15–29–1	23–38–1
Turnovers	1	1
Time of possession	40:35	19:25

Team	Category	Player	Statistics
Colorado Mesa	Passing	Liu Aumavae	8/12, 160 yards, 3 TD
Colorado Mesa	Rushing	Bronco Hartson	12 rushes, 61 yards, 2 TD
Colorado Mesa	Receiving	Trek Keyworth	5 receptions, 93 yards, TD
Eastern New Mexico	Passing	Clifton Cooper	8/15, 196 yards, TD, INT
Eastern New Mexico	Rushing	Emeka Megwa	12 rushes, 64 yards
Eastern New Mexico	Receiving	Trei Kibbles	4 receptions, 118 yards, TD

=== At Texas A&M–Kingsville ===
Eastern New Mexico Greyhounds at Texas A&M–Kingsville – Game summary

Quarter	1	2	3	4	Total
Greyhounds	8	7	0	7	22
Javelinas	14	18	7	17	56

at Javelina Stadium, Kingsville, Texas

- Date: September 19
- Game time: 6:00 p.m. MDT / 7:00 p.m. CDT
- Game weather: Sunny, 90 °F (32 °C)
- Game attendance: 8,000
- Referee: Robert Newton
- Box score, Recap

Game information
First quarter
- TAMK – Christian Kretz 32-yard pass from Mills Dawson (Daniel Gauna kick), 11:35. Javelinas 7–0. Drive: 8 plays, 70 yards, 3:20.
- ENM – Emeka Megwa 1-yard run (Elias Santana run), 6:33. Greyhounds 8–7. Drive: 13 plays, 68 yards, 5:02.
- TAMK – Edward Chumley 22-yard run (Angel Lopez kick), 0:48. Javelinas 14–8. Drive: 12 plays, 46 yards, 5:37.

Second quarter

- ENM – Jose Trevino 6-yard pass from Clifton Cooper (Clayton Vincent kick), 10:01. Greyhounds 15–14. Drive: 10 plays, 61 yards, 3:33.
- TAMK – Edward Chumley 65-yard run (Mills Dawson pass to Christian Kretz), 9:50. Javelinas 22–15. Drive: 1 play, 65 yards, 0:11.
- TAMK – Edward Chumley 4-yard run (Daniel Gauna kick), 6:36. Javelinas 29–15. Drive: 6 plays, 53 yards, 2:16.
- TAMK – Daniel Gauna 40-yard field goal, 0:01. Javelinas 32–15. Drive: 5 plays, 13 yards, 0:26.

Third quarter

- TAMK – Mills Dawson 27-yard run (Daniel Gauna kick), 1:43. Javelinas 39–15. Drive: 4 plays, 54 yards, 1:31.

Fourth quarter

- TAMK – Levi Fontenot 1-yard run (Daniel Gauna kick), 13:25. Javelinas 46–15. Drive: 2 plays, 51 yards, 0:17.
- TAMK – Mills Dawson 2-yard run (Daniel Gauan kick), 10:33. Javelinas 53–15. Drive: 3 plays, 39 yards, 1:24.
- ENM – Trei Kibbles 44-yard pass from Lake Bennett (Clayton Vincent kick), 8:34. Javelinas 53–22. Drive: 5 plays, 73 yards, 1:49.
- TAMK – Daniel Gauna 36-yard field goal, 4:32. Javelinas 56–22. Drive: 4 plays, 3 yards, 1:54.

Statistics	ENM	TAMK
First downs	20	18
Total yards	389	480
Rushing yards	245	232
Passing yards	144	248
Passing: comp–att–int	12–24–2	21–31–0
Turnovers	4	0
Time of possession	29:38	30:15

Team	Category	Player	Statistics
Eastern New Mexico	Passing	Clifton Cooper	6/11, 63 yards, TD, INT
Eastern New Mexico	Rushing	Clifton Cooper	12 rushes, 48 yards
Eastern New Mexico	Receiving	Jose Trevino	5 receptions, 57 yards, TD
Texas A&M–Kingsville	Passing	Mills Dawson	21/30, 248 yards, TD
Texas A&M–Kingsville	Rushing	Edward Chumley	14 rushes, 118 yards, 3 TD
Texas A&M–Kingsville	Receiving	Christian Kretz	6 receptions, 75 yards, TD

=== UT Permian Basin ===
UT Permian Basin Falcons at Eastern New Mexico Greyhounds – Game summary

Quarter	1	2	3	4	Total
Falcons	14	14	7	21	56
Greyhounds	3	0	7	0	10

at Steve Loy Family Foundation Stadium, Portales, New Mexico

- Date: September 26
- Game time: 2:00 p.m. MDT
- Game weather: Sunny, 76 °F (24 °C)
- Referee: Steve Hill
- Box score, Recap

Game information
First quarter
- ENM – Kaden Dow 25-yard field goal, 4:12. Greyhounds 3–0. Drive: 19 plays, 65 yards, 7:08.
- UTPB – Cheno Navarrette 52-yard pass from Nate TenBarge (Diego Chavarria kick), 4:03. Falcons 7–3. Drive: 1 play, 52 yards, 0:09.
- UTPB – Aiden Serrano 4-yard pass from Nate TenBarge (Diego Chavarria kick), 0:51. Falcons 14–3. Drive: 4 plays, 60 yards, 1:01.

Second quarter

- UTPB – Nate TenBarge 3-yard run (Diego Chavarria kick), 8:04. Falcons 21–3. Drive: 7 plays, 89 yards, 3:16.
- UTPB – Traylen Suel 10-yard pass from Nate TenBarge (Diego Chavarria kick), 0:54. Falcons 28–3. Drive: 12 plays, 74 yards, 4:17.

Third quarter

- UTPB – J. T. Seagraves 3-yard pass from Nate TenBarge (Diego Chavarria kick), 5:56. Falcons 35–3. Drive: 9 plays, 80 yards, 4:08.
- ENM – Trei Kibbles 6-yard pass from Jake South (Kaden Dow kick), 0:08. Falcons 35–10. Drive: 9 plays, 80 yards, 5:48.

Fourth quarter

- UTPB – Solomon James 9-yard run (Diego Chavarria kick), 14:50. Falcons 42–10. Drive: 8 plays, 86 yards, 3:34.
- UTPB – Traylen Suel 42-yard pass from Solomon James (Diego Chavarria kick), 12:27. Falcons 49–10. Drive: 3 plays, 54 yards, 1:27.
- UTPB – Solomon James 11-yard run (Diego Chavarria kick), 4:46. Falcons 56–10. Drive: 3 plays, 15 yards, 1:36.

Statistics	UTPB	ENM
First downs	32	19
Total yards	583	294
Rushing yards	281	56
Passing yards	302	238
Passing: comp–att–int	21–33–1	20–38–2
Turnovers	1	3
Time of possession	41:38	18:22

Team	Category	Player	Statistics
UT Permian Basin	Passing	Nate TenBarge	18/28, 245 yards, 4 TD, INT
UT Permian Basin	Rushing	Cheno Navarrette	7 rushes, 82 yards
UT Permian Basin	Receiving	Tarylen Suel	5 receptions, 95 yards, 2 TD
Eastern New Mexico	Passing	Jake South	17/27, 229 yards, TD, 2 INT
Eastern New Mexico	Rushing	Jose Trevino	10 rushes, 36 yards
Eastern New Mexico	Receiving	Trei Kibbles	3 receptions, 61 yards, TD

=== At Sul Ross ===
Eastern New Mexico Greyhounds at Sul Ross Lobos – Game summary

Quarter	1	2	3	4	Total
Greyhounds	14	7	15	7	43
Lobos	21	3	12	20	56

at Jackson Field, Alpine, Texas

- Date: October 3
- Game time: 6:00 p.m. MDT / 7:00 p.m. CDT
- Game weather: Cloudy, 67 °F (19 °C)
- Referee: Jon Sasse
- Box score, Recap

Game information
First quarter
- SRS – Keithron Lee 42-yard pass from Will Howell (Jason Maltos kick), 7:25. Lobos 7–0. Drive: 8 plays, 68 yards, 4:14.
- SRS – Will Howell 1-yard run (Jason Maltos kick), 3:51. Lobos 14–0. Drive: 4 plays, 74 yards, 1:17.
- ENM – Trei Kibbles 17-yard pass from Jake South (Kaden Dow kick), 2:19. Lobos 14–7. Drive: 5 plays, 75 yards, 1:26.
- ENM – Malachi Hannah 10-yard interception return (Kaden Dow kick), 1:43. Tied 14–14.
- SRS – Will Howell 19-yard run (Jason Maltos kick), 0:06. Lobos 21–14. Drive: 4 plays, 72 yards, 1:31.

Second quarter

- ENM – Jose Trevino 45-yard run (Kaden Dow kick), 1:19. Tied 21–21. Drive: 5 plays, 60 yards, 0:47.
- SRS – Jason Maltos 19-yard field goal, 0:00. Lobos 24–21. Drive: 7 plays, 56 yards, 1:19.

Third quarter

- SRS – Keithron Lee 11-yard pass from Will Howell (kick blocked), 12:24. Lobos 30–21. Drive: 6 plays, 65 yards, 2:36.
- SRS – Jason Sanford 40-yard interception return (kick failed), 11:41. Lobos 36–21.
- ENM – Clifton Cooper 1-yard run (Kaden Dow kick), 10:05. Lobos 36–28. Drive: 7 plays, 63 yards, 1:28.
- ENM – Clifton Cooper 5-yard run (Emeka Megwa kick), 6:30. Tied 36–36. Drive: 7 plays, 46 yards, 1:46.

Fourth quarter

- ENM – Jose Trevino 61-yard run (Kaden Dow kick), 9:38. Greyhounds 43–36. Drive: 2 plays, 88 yards, 0:39.
- SRS – Rashad Madden 14-yard run (Jason Maltos kick), 7:35. Tied 43–43. Drive: 5 plays, 56 yards, 2:02.
- SRS – Keithron Lee 13-yard pass from Will Howell (Jason Maltos kick), 2:35. Lobos 50–43. Drive: 3 plays, 20 yards, 1:08.
- SRS – Kyree Payton 29-yard pass from Will Howell (kick failed), 1:39. Lobos 56–43. Drive: 3 plays, 34 yards, 0:19.

Statistics	ENM	SRS
First downs	23	36
Total yards	625	589
Rushing yards	521	135
Passing yards	104	454
Passing: comp–att–int	9–23–2	37–46–1
Turnovers	5	4
Time of possession	25:27	34:33

Team	Category	Player	Statistics
Eastern New Mexico	Passing	Jake South	5/9, 53 yards, TD, INT
Eastern New Mexico	Rushing	Jose Trevino	13 rushes, 202 yards, 2 TD
Eastern New Mexico	Receiving	Trei Kibbles	3 receptions, 45 yards, TD
Sul Ross	Passing	Will Howell	37/46, 454 yards, 4 TD, INT
Sul Ross	Rushing	Will Howell	22 rushes, 82 yards, 2 TD
Sul Ross	Receiving	Taribbean Ramirez	14 receptions, 125 yards

=== At Western New Mexico ===
Eastern New Mexico Greyhounds at Western New Mexico Mustangs – Game summary

Quarter	1	2	3	4	Total
Greyhounds	7	14	14	20	55
Mustangs	13	21	7	20	61

at Altamirano Stadium, Silver City, New Mexico

- Date: October 10
- Game time: 2:00 p.m. MDT
- Game weather: Sunny, 69 °F (21 °C)
- Game attendance: 831
- Referee: Daniel Mena
- Box score, Recap

Game information
First quarter
- ENM – Jose Trevino 3-yard run (Kaden Dow kick), 6:07. Greyhounds 7–0. Drive: 7 plays, 66 yards, 7:10.
- WNM – Zakkarii Black 2-yard run (run failed), 4:01. Greyhounds 7–6. Drive: 6 plays, 75 yards, 1:48.
- WNM – Devon Nofoa-Masoe 14-yard run (Nathan Flores kick), 1:08. Mustangs 13–7. Drive: 11 plays, 97 yards, 2:18.

Second quarter

- ENM – Clifton Cooper 5-yard run (Kaden Dow kick), 11:02. Greyhounds 14–13. Drive: 3 plays, 61 yards, 0:59.
- WNM – Zakkarii Black 69-yard pass from Jase Ashley (Nathan Flores kick), 10:33. Mustangs 20–14. Drive: 2 plays, 69 yards, 0:27.
- ENM – Jose Trevino 15-yard run (Kaden Dow kick), 8:59. Greyhounds 21–20. Drive: 5 plays, 57 yards, 1:26.
- WNM – Joshua Gaines 4-yard run (Nathan Flores kick), 2:06. Mustangs 27–21. Drive: 11 plays, 63 yards, 6:47.
- WNM – Demarion Postell 4-yard pass from Jase Ashley (Nathan Flores kick), 0:00. Mustangs 34–21. Drive: 10 plays, 50 yards, 1:14.

Third quarter

- ENM – Clifton Cooper 7-yard run (Kaden Dow kick), 10:52. Mustangs 34–28. Drive: 11 plays, 75 yards, 4:08.
- WNM – Jase Ashley 6-yard run (Nathan Flores kick), 6:46. Mustangs 41–28. Drive: 7 plays, 67 yards, 3:58.
- ENM – Dawson Hall 4-yard pass from Clifton Cooper (Kaden Dow kick), 1:42. Mustangs 41–35. Drive: 15 plays, 86 yards, 4:54.

Fourth quarter

- WNM – Dennis Ionica 25-yard pass from Jase Ashley (Nathan Flores kick), 14:42. Mustangs 48–35. Drive: 5 plays, 54 yards, 1:50.
- ENM – Clifton Cooper 20-yard run (Kaden Dow kick), 8:12. Mustangs 48–42. Drive: 6 plays, 78 yards, 1:53.
- WNM – Jase Ashley 78-yard run (run failed), 7:13. Mustangs 54–42. Drive: 2 plays, 82 yards, 0:54.
- ENM – Emeka Megwa 5-yard run (pass failed), 3:54. Mustangs 54–48. Drive: 11 plays, 70 yards, 3:13.
- WNM – Devon Nofoa-Masoe 24-yard run (Nathan Flores kick), 1:06. Mustangs 61–48. Drive: 8 plays, 75 yards, 2:48.
- ENM – Clifton Cooper 10-yard run (Kaden Dow kick), 0:59. Mustangs 61–55. Drive: 5 plays, 55 yards, 0:04.

Statistics	ENM	WNM
First downs	36	29
Total yards	630	669
Rushing yards	335	419
Passing yards	295	242
Passing: comp–att–int	22–30–1	12–19–0
Turnovers	1	0
Time of possession	31:11	29:54

Team	Category	Player	Statistics
Eastern New Mexico	Passing	Clifton Cooper	22/30, 295 yards, TD, INT
Eastern New Mexico	Rushing	Clifton Cooper	21 rushes, 168 yards, 4 TD
Eastern New Mexico	Receiving	Darwin Parker	6 receptions, 103 yards
Western New Mexico	Passing	Jase Ashley	12/19, 242 yards, 3 TD
Western New Mexico	Rushing	Devon Nofoa-Maose	26 rushes, 201 yards, 2 TD
Western New Mexico	Receiving	Zakkarii Black	4 receptions, 105 yards, TD

=== West Texas A&M ===
West Texas A&M Buffaloes at Eastern New Mexico Greyhounds – Game summary

Quarter	1	2	3	4	Total
Buffaloes	17	21	3	0	41
Greyhounds	0	0	21	6	27

at Steve Loy Family Foundation Stadium, Portales, New Mexico

- Date: October 17
- Game time: 3:00 p.m. MDT
- Game weather: Sunny, 50 °F (10 °C)
- Referee: Royce Smith
- Box score, Recap

Game information
First quarter
- WTAM – Alan Anaya 29-yard field goal, 13:52. Buffaloes 3–0. Drive: 4 plays, 4 yards, 0:57.
- WTAM – J. B. Mitchell III 8-yard pass from Jayden Macedo (Alan Anaya kick), 7:14. Buffaloes 10–0. Drive: 7 plays, 56 yards, 2:10.
- WTAM – Trace Clarkson 69-yard pass from Jayden Macedo (Alan Anaya kick), 3:59. Buffaloes 17–0. Drive: 6 plays, 93 yards, 2:18.

Second quarter

- WTAM – Contae Cason 10-yard run (Alan Anaya kick), 10:17. Buffaloes 24–0. Drive: 5 plays, 87 yards, 1:44.
- WTAM – Geramayah Porter 14-yard pass from Jayden Macedo (Alan Anaya kick), 5:17. Buffaloes 31–0. Drive: 8 plays, 56 yards, 3:02.
- WTAM – Langston Anderson 14-yard pass from Colt Mercer (Alan Anaya kick), 1:35. Buffaloes 38–0. Drive: 6 plays, 49 yards, 1:25.

Third quarter

- ENM – Clifton Cooper 2-yard run (Kaden Dow kick), 11:28. Buffaloes 38–7. Drive: 12 plays, 75 yards, 3:32.
- WTAM – Alan Anaya 18-yard field goal, 8:57. Buffaloes 41–7. Drive: 7 plays, 41 yards, 2:25.
- ENM – Jose Trevino 9-yard run (Kaden Dow kick), 2:51. Buffaloes 41–14. Drive: 4 plays, 33 yards, 0:53.
- ENM – Trei Kibbles 92-yard pass from Clifton Cooper (Kaden Dow kick), 0:38. Buffaloes 41–21. Drive: 2 plays, 95 yards, 0:32.

Fourth quarter

- ENM – Kyler Fossett 35-yard pass from Clifton Cooper (kick blocked), 1:54. Buffaloes 41–27. Drive: 17 plays, 70 yards, 4:44.

Statistics	WTAM	ENM
First downs	22	23
Total yards	461	626
Rushing yards	254	124
Passing yards	207	502
Passing: comp–att–int	13–26–0	37–65–1
Turnovers	0	1
Time of possession	27:25	32:35

Team	Category	Player	Statistics
West Texas A&M	Passing	Jayden Macedo	9/17, 170 yards, 3 TD
West Texas A&M	Rushing	Tory Simmons	11 rushes, 117 yards
West Texas A&M	Receiving	Trace Clarkson	4 receptions, 97 yards, TD
Eastern New Mexico	Passing	Clifton Cooper	36/64, 502 yards, 2 TD, INT
Eastern New Mexico	Rushing	Jose Trevino	16 rushes, 75 yards, TD
Eastern New Mexico	Receiving	Trei Kibbles	5 receptions, 160 yards, TD

=== At Western Oregon ===
Eastern New Mexico Greyhounds at Western Oregon Wolves – Game summary

Quarter	1	2	3	4	Total
Greyhounds	14	14	7	0	35
Wolves	7	13	9	21	50

at McArthur Field, Monmouth, Oregon

- Date: October 24
- Game time: 1:05 p.m. MDT / 12:05 p.m. PDT
- Game weather: Cloudy, 59 °F (15 °C)
- Game attendance: 1,327
- Referee: Tracy Hernandez
- Box score, Recap

Game information
First quarter
- ENM – Clifton Cooper 21-yard run (Kaden Dow kick), 11:40. Greyhounds 7–0. Drive: 9 plays, 75 yards, 3:20.
- WOU – Tyler Konold 6-yard run (Kadyn Butcher kick), 4:17. Tied 7–7. Drive: 7 plays, 58 yards, 3:53.
- ENM – Ryder Lambert 18-yard run (Kaden Dow kick), 0:42. Greyhounds 14–7. Drive: 11 plays, 58 yards, 3:30.

Second quarter

- WOU – Jaylen Fite 78-yard pass from Jordan McCarty (kick failed), 6:30. Greyhounds 14–13. Drive: 3 plays, 80 yards, 1:05.
- ENM – Darwin Parker 43-yard pass from Clifton Cooper (Kaden Dow kick), 4:03. Greyhounds 21–13. Drive: 7 plays, 75 yards, 2:27.
- ENM – Darwin Parker 74-yard pass from Clifton Cooper (Kaden Dow kick), 2:30. Greyhounds 28–13. Drive: 1 play, 74 yards, 0:10.
- WOU – E'lijiah McChristian 18-yard pass from Jordan McCarty (Kadyn Butcher kick), 1:01. Greyhounds 28–20. Drive: 6 plays, 77 yards, 1:29.

Third quarter

- WOU – Kadyn Butcher 24-yard field goal, 9:47. Greyhounds 28–23. Drive: 12 plays, 62 yards, 5:09.
- ENM – Jose Trevino 24-yard run (Kaden Dow kick), 7:28. Greyhounds 35–23. Drive: 6 plays, 75 yards, 2:19.
- WOU – Jordan McCarty 4-yard run (pass failed), 2:57. Greyhounds 35–29. Drive: 10 plays, 63 yards, 4:25.

Fourth quarter

- WOU – Tyler Konold 2-yard run (Kadyn Butcher kick), 9:14. Wolves 36–35. Drive: 12 plays, 91 yards, 5:36.
- WOU – Emmitt Fee 6-yard pass from Jordan McCarty (Kadyn Butcher kick), 3:18. Wolves 43–35. Drive: 9 plays, 55 yards, 4:20.
- WOU – Keagan Howard 21-yard fumble return (Kadyn Butcher kick), 3:07. Wolves 50–35.

Statistics	ENM	WOU
First downs	29	26
Total yards	623	484
Rushing yards	200	239
Passing yards	423	245
Passing: comp–att–int	31–40–1	13–23–1
Turnovers	2	1
Time of possession	27:20	32:40

Team	Category	Player	Statistics
Eastern New Mexico	Passing	Clifton Cooper	31/40, 423 yards, 2 TD, INT
Eastern New Mexico	Rushing	Clifton Cooper	18 rushes, 68 yards, TD
Eastern New Mexico	Receiving	Darwin Parker	6 receptions, 183 yards, 2 TD
Western Oregon	Passing	Jordan McCarty	13/23, 245 yards, 3 TD, INT
Western Oregon	Rushing	Tyler Konold	13 rushes, 88 yards, 2 TD
Western Oregon	Receiving	Jaylen Fite	1 reception, 78 yards, TD

=== No. 12 Central Washington ===
No. 12 Central Washington Wildcats at Eastern New Mexico Greyhounds – Game summary

Quarter	1	2	3	4	Total
No. 12 Wildcats	7	14	21	7	49
Greyhounds	6	0	7	7	20

at Steve Loy Family Foundation Stadium, Portales, New Mexico

- Date: October 31
- Game time: 2:00 p.m. MDT
- Game weather: Cloudy, 67 °F (19 °C)
- Game attendance: 1,580
- Referee: Jason Hickey
- Box score, Recap

Game information
First quarter
- ENM – Xavier Johnson 4-yard pass from Clifton Cooper (kick blocked), 10:27. Greyhounds 6–0. Drive: 13 plays, 75 yards, 4:33.
- CWU – Ryder Bumgarner 2-yard run (David Weber kick), 4:35. Wildcats 7–6. Drive: 12 plays, 65 yards, 5:48.

Second quarter

- CWU – Isaac Torres 25-yard pass from Justin Brennan (David Weber kick), 13:09. Wildcats 14–6. Drive: 7 plays, 60 yards, 3:59.
- CWU – Ryder Bumgarner 5-yard run (David Weber kick), 7:04. Wildcats 21–6. Drive: 4 plays, 76 yards, 1:53.

Third quarter

- CWU – Mason Juergens 18-yard pass from Justin Brennan (David Weber kick), 11:24. Wildcats 28–6. Drive: 7 plays, 57 yards, 3:32.
- ENM – Emeka Megwa 15-yard run (Kaden Dow kick), 9:03. Wildcats 28–13. Drive: 7 plays, 75 yards, 2:21.
- CWU – Mason Juergens 20-yard pass from Justin Brennan (David Weber kick), 4:48. Wildcats 35–13. Drive: 8 plays, 75 yards, 4:15.
- CWU – Justice Taylor 1-yard run (David Weber kick), 0:49. Wildcats 42–13. Drive: 5 plays, 15 yards, 2:45.

Fourth quarter

- CWU – Antoine Lee 58-yard run (David Weber kick), 9:09. Wildcats 49–13. Drive: 3 plays, 75 yards, 1:33.
- ENM – Trei Kibbles 37-yard pass from Clifton Cooper (Kaden Dow kick), 6:14. Wildcats 49–20. Drive: 8 plays, 70 yards, 2:55.

Statistics	CWU	ENM
First downs	29	27
Total yards	600	427
Rushing yards	301	179
Passing yards	299	248
Passing: comp–att–int	13–14–0	26–40–2
Turnovers	0	2
Time of possession	33:33	26:27

Team	Category	Player	Statistics
Central Washington	Passing	Justin Brennan	12/13, 290 yards, 2 TD
Central Washington	Rushing	Ryder Bumgarner	24 rushes, 132 yards, 2 TD
Central Washington	Receiving	A. J. Perez	3 receptions, 123 yards
Eastern New Mexico	Passing	Clifton Cooper	26/40, 248 yards, 2 TD, 2 INT
Eastern New Mexico	Rushing	Clifton Cooper	17 rushes, 82 yards
Eastern New Mexico	Receiving	Darwin Parker	10 receptions, 106 yards

=== At Angelo State ===
Eastern New Mexico Greyhounds at Angelo State Rams – Game summary

Quarter	1	2	3	4	Total
Greyhounds	0	7	0	0	7
Rams	13	0	0	7	20

at LeGrand Sports Complex, San Angelo, Texas

- Date: November 7
- Game time: 5:00 p.m. MST / 6:00 p.m. CST
- Game weather: Sunny
- Game attendance: 303
- Referee: Jeffrey Thigpen
- Box score, Recap

Game information
First quarter
- ASU – Cameron Dischler 11-yard run (run failed), 8:35. Rams 6–0. Drive: 13 plays, 70 yards, 6:19.
- ASU – Trevor Winn 23-yard pass from Maddox Maher (Paden Maass kick), 0:53. Rams 13–0. Drive: 12 plays, 80 yards, 4:48.

Second quarter

- ENM – Mekhi Norris 7-yard run (Clayton Vincent kick), 11:21. Rams 13–7. Drive: 12 plays, 71 yards, 4:25.

Third quarter

- No scoring plays

Fourth quarter

- ASU – Jayden Jones 6-yard run (Paden Maass kick), 4:32. Rams 20–7. Drive: 7 plays, 82 yards, 3:07.

Statistics	ENM	ASU
First downs	18	20
Total yards	287	328
Rushing yards	251	258
Passing yards	36	70
Passing: comp–att–int	8–23–1	7–14–0
Turnovers	1	1
Time of possession	28:01	31:59

Team	Category	Player	Statistics
Eastern New Mexico	Passing	Clifton Cooper	8/23, 36 yards, INT
Eastern New Mexico	Rushing	Clifton Cooper	24 rushes, 99 yards
Eastern New Mexico	Receiving	Darwin Parker	2 receptions, 16 yards
Angelo State	Passing	Maddox Maher	7/14, 70 yards, TD
Angelo State	Rushing	Canon Wiese	19 rushes, 119 yards
Angelo State	Receiving	Alan Dobbins	3 receptions, 37 yards

=== No. 19 Midwestern State ===
No. 19 Midwestern State Mustangs at Eastern New Mexico Greyhounds – Game summary

Quarter	1	2	3	4	Total
No. 19 Mustangs	14	0	14	29	57
Greyhounds	0	3	6	23	32

at Steve Loy Family Foundation Stadium, Portales, New Mexico

- Date: November 14
- Game time: 2:00 p.m. MST
- Game weather: Sunny, 53 °F (12 °C)
- Game attendance: 750
- Referee: Steve Hill
- Box score

Game information
First quarter
- MSU – Joseph Dodds 6-yard run (Kohen Maroney kick), 11:20. Mustangs 7–0. Drive: 7 plays, 42 yards, 2:17.
- MSU – Fabian Baez 10-yard run (Kohen Maroney kick), 2:41. Mustangs 14–0. Drive: 5 plays, 89 yards, 1:09.

Second quarter

- ENM – Clayton Vincent 21-yard field goal, 13:38. Mustangs 14–3. Drive: 9 plays, 64 yards, 4:03.

Third quarter

- MSU – Junior Heimuli 1-yard pass from Kaden Brown (Kohen Maroney kick), 9:37. Mustangs 21–3. Drive: 13 plays, 65 yards, 5:23.
- ENM – Trei Kibbles 44-yard pass from Clifton Cooper (run failed), 7:25. Mustangs 21–9. Drive: 7 plays, 70 yards, 2:12.
- MSU – Dominic Cox 25-yard pass from Kaden Brown (Kohen Maroney kick), 5:56. Mustangs 28–9. Drive: 5 plays, 64 yards, 1:23.

Fourth quarter

- MSU – Brock Temple 5-yard pass from Kaden Brown (Kaden Brown pass to Kenjo Johnson), 14:55. Mustangs 36–9. Drive: 11 plays, 45 yards, 4:40.
- MSU – Kenji Johnson 24-yard run (Kohen Maroney kick), 13:57. Mustangs 43–9. Drive: 2 plays, 29 yards, 0:50.
- ENM – Mekhi Norris 32-yard pass from Clifton Cooper (Clifton Cooper pass to Lucas George), 11:37. Mustangs 43–17. Drive: 7 plays, 75 yards, 2:20.
- ENM – Kyler Fossett 2-yard pass from Clifton Cooper (Clayton Vincent kick), 5:19. Mustangs 43–24. Drive: 8 plays, 70 yards, 3:38.
- MSU – Davian Watson 30-yard pass from Kaden Brown (Kohen Maroney kick), 2:17. Mustangs 50–24. Drive: 7 plays, 69 yards, 3:00.
- MSU – Clifton Cooper 2-yard run (Elias Santana run), 1:48. Mustangs 50–32. Drive: 3 plays, 21 yards, 0:15.
- MSU – Jaden Coulter 9-yard pass from Sean Jastrab (Kohen Maroney kick), 0:08. Mustangs 57–32. Drive: 5 plays, 75 yards, 1:40.

Statistics	MSU	ENM
First downs	33	21
Total yards	629	482
Rushing yards	460	158
Passing yards	169	324
Passing: comp–att–int	17–26–1	18–28–0
Turnovers	2	1
Time of possession	32:59	27:01

Team	Category	Player	Statistics
Midwestern State	Passing	Kaden Brown	15/24, 140 yards, 4 TD, INT
Midwestern State	Rushing	Joseph Dodds	24 rushes, 196 yards, TD
Midwestern State	Receiving	Dominic Cox	2 receptions, 42 yards, TD
Eastern New Mexico	Passing	Clifton Cooper	14/23, 261 yards, 3 TD
Eastern New Mexico	Rushing	Clifton Cooper	27 rushes, 74 yards, TD
Eastern New Mexico	Receiving	Mekhi Norris	4 receptions, 104 yards, TD
