= Museum of the Big Bend =

Museum in Alpine, Texas

- Location within Texas
- Established: 1937
- Location: 400 North Harrison Street; Alpine, Texas
- Coordinates: 30.36397°N 103.65153°W
- Type: History museum
- Owner: Sul Ross State University
- Website: Official web site

The Museum of the Big Bend is a museum on the campus of and governed by Sul Ross State University in Alpine, Texas, United States that showcases the natural history, culture, and art of the Big Bend region of Texas. The Works Progress Administration built the original museum in 1937. The museum expanded in 2023 to double its original size.

== History ==
The Commission of Control for Texas Centennial Celebrations (better known as the Texas Centennial Commission) was the state body created in 1935 by the Texas Legislature to organize Texas's 1936 centennial, marking 100 years of independence from Mexico. In 1936 the commission allocated funds for a museum facility on the Sul Ross State University campus. The Works Progress Administration (WPA) provided additional funding to cover the $75,000 cost. Sul Ross industrial arts professor Victor J. Smith, a self-trained architect, designed the building and supervised construction. The WPA provided the labor force to build the project. Former Governor Pat Morris Neff dedicated the museum on May 1, 1937.

By 1966 the West Texas Historical and Scientific Society, the original steward of the museum, was inactive. The museum closed and the collections passed to Sul Ross. The museum building became the university student center. The university housed the collections in a former bowling alley and then in Lawrence Hall, an academic building on campus. A new student center opened in 2000, and the original museum building was abandoned. In 2003 a successful $3.3 million capital campaign funded the renovation of the building, and the university dedicated the new Museum of the Big Bend on August 15, 2007.

An $11 million, 10,000 square foot expansion opened on June 23, 2023. Miriam McCoy, whose family owns McCoy's Building Supply, donated $5 million for the project. University of Texas School of Architecture professor Larry Speck, also a principal in the architecture firm Page Southerland Page, designed the modern new weathering steel building that sits close to the original building, and is connected by an enclosed walkway. It is named the Emmett and Miriam McCoy Building. The building has a events center that can be configured for 300 people standing or 80 people seated.

== Collection ==
The Museum of the Big Bend houses diverse collections with ties to the Big Bend region.

=== Maps ===
The Yana & Marty Davis Map Collection is over 2,000 maps focusing on the Texas-Mexico borderlands. It is one of the largest and most diversified collections of Texas maps in the state. The collection is housed in a special map room.

=== Art ===
The Betty Byerley Collection is a group of over twenty-five retablo, small devotional paintings usually on tin. The Mr. & Mrs. Robert E. McKee III Family Fred Darge Collection is a collection of paintings by Friedrich “Fred” Ernst Darge who chronicled the everyday lives of people living in the area during the early to mid-20th century.

=== Natural history ===
The museum houses paleontological collections covering 130 million years, from the age of dinosaurs to the age of mammals, with exhibits that feature fossils like the Bravoceratops and a replica of a giant Quetzalcoatlus. Interpretive exhibits focus on the unique ecosystem of the Chihuahuan Desert.

== See also ==
- List of museums in West Texas
