= McCoy's =

McCoy's may refer to:

- A British potato snack
- The public house in Fair City
- McCoy's Building Supply

== See also ==
- McCoy (disambiguation)
