= Scott Power =

American football coach (born 1982)

Current position
- Title: Head coach
- Team: Central Washington
- Conference: LSC
- Record: 10–2

Biographical details
- Born: c. 1982 (age 43–44); Fowler, Indiana, U.S.
- Education: Indiana University–Purdue University Indianapolis (2005)

Playing career
- 2000–2001: Wisconsin–Platteville
- 2002–2003: Hanover
- 2004: Turku Trojans
- 2005: Quad City Steamwheelers
- 2006: Louisville Fire
- Positions: Linebacker, fullback

Coaching career (HC unless noted)
- 2007–2008: Benton Central HS (IN) (DC)
- 2009–2010: Wartburg (DL)
- 2011–2012: Wartburg (LB)
- 2013–2015: Marian (IN) (DC)
- 2016–2017: Central Washington (DC)
- 2018: Texas A&M–Commerce (DC)
- 2019–2021: Stephen F. Austin (DC/LB)
- 2022–2023: Louisiana Tech (DC/LB)
- 2024: Western Michigan (DC/S)
- 2025: Wisconsin (assistant DB)
- 2026–present: Central Washington

Head coaching record
- Overall: 10–2
- Tournaments: 1–0 (NCAA D-II playoffs)

Accomplishments and honors

Championships
- LSC (2026)

Awards
- 2× First-team All-HCAC (2002, 2003); LSC Co-Coach of the Year (2026)

Scott Power (born c. 1982) is an American college football coach. He is the head football coach for Central Washington University, a position he has held since 2026.

== Playing career ==
Power graduated from Benton Central Junior-Senior High School in 2000. He then enrolled in the University of Wisconsin–Platteville, where he was a two-year member of the Pioneers football team as a linebacker. In 2002, Power transferred to Hanover. In two seasons with the school, he earned two First-team All-Heartland Collegiate Athletic Conference (HCAC) honors. During his senior year, Power recorded 118 tackles, which was good enough for second on his team and earned him the honor of Hanover's top linebacker, as voted by his teammates.

In 2004, Power played for the Turku Trojans of the Vaahteraliiga. The team went 11–1, with their only loss coming in the Vaahteramalja XXV. After the season, he was voted as one of the league's top Americans.

After one season in Finland, Power returned to the United States and played for the Quad City Steamwheelers of the AF2. In 2006, he played for the Louisville Fire. With Louisville, Power was teammates with former Hanover quarterback Brett Dietz.

== Coaching career ==
=== Assistant coach ===
In 2007, Power returned to his alma mater, Benton Central, as the school's defensive coordinator.

In 2009, Power was hired as a part-time defensive line coach at Wartburg under head coach Rick Willis. In 2011, Power was promoted to a full-time assistant and became the team's linebackers coach.

From 2013 to 2024, Power spent time as a defensive coordinator for Marian (IN), Central Washington, Texas A&M–Commerce, Stephen F. Austin, Louisiana Tech, and Western Michigan.

In 2025, Power was hired as the assistant defensive backs coach for Wisconsin.

=== Head coach ===
==== Central Washington ====
After one season, Power was named the head football coach for Central Washington. He rejoined the team after ten years following the departure of Chris Fisk for Portland State.

In his first season as the Wildcats' head coach, Power led Central Washington to its second-straight Lone Star Conference (LSC) title, going a perfect 9–0 in LSC play. For the NCAA Division II playoffs, the Wildcats were selected as the 4th seed in Super Region 4. Power was named the 2026 Lone Star Conference Co-Coach of the Year, along with Rich Renner of Midwestern State.

== Personal life ==
In November 2008, Power married Megan Bronnenberg.

== Head coaching record ==
Year	Team	Overall	Conference	Standing	Bowl/playoffs	AFCA^{#}	D2^{°}
Central Washington Wildcats (Lone Star Conference) (2026–present)
2026	Central Washington	10–2	9–0	1st	TBD NCAA Division II playoffs		
Central Washington:		10–2	9–0				
Total:		10–2					
National championship Conference title Conference division title or championship game berth
