= 2026 Central Washington Wildcats football team =

American college football season

2026 Central Washington Wildcats football

LSC champion

NCAA Division II playoffs
- Conference: Lone Star Conference

Ranking
- AFCA: No. 7
- Record: 10–2 (9–0 LSC)
- Head coach: Scott Power (1st season)
- Offensive coordinator: Sam King (1st season)
- Offensive scheme: Pro spread
- Defensive coordinator: Tyler Stinn (1st season)
- Base defense: Multiple 4–2–5
- Home stadium: Tomlinson Stadium

2026 Lone Star Conference football standings
	Conf.			Overall
Team	W		L	W		L
No. 7 Central Washington $^	9	–	0	10	–	2
No. 16 Midwestern State ^	8	–	1	9	–	3
Texas A&M–Kingsville	6	–	3	6	–	5
Western Oregon	5	–	4	7	–	4
UT Permian Basin	5	–	4	6	–	5
Angelo State	5	–	4	5	–	6
West Texas A&M	4	–	5	4	–	7
Western New Mexico	2	–	7	3	–	8
Sul Ross	1	–	8	2	–	9
Eastern New Mexico	0	–	9	0	–	11
$ – Conference champion; ^ – NCAA Division II playoff participant; As of November 22, 2026; Rankings from AFCA poll

The 2026 Central Washington Wildcats football team represents Central Washington University during the 2026 NCAA Division II football season as a football-only member of the Lone Star Conference (LSC). The Wildcats are led by first-year head coach Scott Power and play home games at Tomlinson Stadium in Ellensburg, Washington.

The Wildcats finished the regular season with an overall record of 9–2 and went 9–0 in LSC play, capturing the program's second straight LSC title. For the NCAA Division II playoffs, Central Washington was selected as the 4th seed in Super Region 4.

Scott Power was named LSC co-coach of the year (along with Rich Renner of Midwestern State), linebacker Brycen Indell was named LSC defensive player of the year, and wide receiver Isaac Torres was named LSC newcomer of the year.

== Schedule ==
Date	Time	Opponent	Rank	Site	TV	Result	Attendance
September 5	5:00 p.m.	at Cal Poly*	No. 6	Mustang Memorial Field; San Luis Obispo, CA	ESPN+	L 17–24	8,034
September 12	6:00 p.m.	No. 1 Ferris State*	No. 9	Tomlinson Stadium; Ellensburg, WA	FloSports	L 14–28	4,889
September 19	6:00 p.m.	No. 10 Western Oregon	No. 16	Tomlinson Stadium; Ellensburg, WA	FloSports	W 45–36	5,199
September 26	6:00 p.m.	Sul Ross	No. 14	Tomlinson Stadium; Ellensburg, WA	FloSports	W 61–22	4,877
October 3	5:00 p.m.	at Angelo State	No. 12	LeGrand Sports Complex; San Angelo, TX	FloSports	W 41–14	2,112
October 10	6:00 p.m.	Midwestern State^{†}	No. 13	Tomlinson Stadium; Ellensburg, WA	FloSports	W 44–29	5,983
October 17	5:00 p.m.	at Texas A&M–Kingsville	No. 11	Javelina Stadium; Kingsville, TX	FloSports	W 52–49	4,350
October 24	6:00 p.m.	UT Permian Basin	No. 13	Tomlinson Stadium; Ellensburg, WA	FloSports	W 42–13	5,947
October 31	1:00 p.m.	at Eastern New Mexico	No. 12	Steve Loy Family Foundation Stadium; Portales, NM	FloSports	W 49–20	1,580
November 7	1:00 p.m.	Western New Mexico	No. 9	Tomlinson Stadium; Ellensburg, WA	FloSports	W 52–10	5,001
November 14	12:00 p.m.	at West Texas A&M	No. 8	Bain–Schaeffer Buffalo Stadium; Canyon, TX	FloSports	W 51–14	3,324
November 21	1:00 p.m.	No. 8 Western Colorado*	No. 7	Tomlinson Stadium; Ellensburg, WA (NCAA Division II First Round)	ESPN+	W 24–17	4,221
November 28	11:00 a.m.	at No. 3 CSU Pueblo*	No. 7	ThunderBowl; Pueblo, CO (NCAA Division II Second Round)	ESPN+		
*Non-conference game; ^{†}Homecoming; Rankings from AFCA Poll released prior to the game; All times are in Pacific time

== Rankings ==
Ranking movements Legend: ██ Increase in ranking ██ Decrease in ranking
	Week													
Poll	Pre	1	2	3	4	5	6	7	8	9	10	11	12	Final
AFCA	7	6	9	16	14	12	13	11	13	12	9	8	7	
D2 Football	9	8	9	10	9	8	8	7	7	7	7	5	4	

== Offseason ==
=== Coaching changes ===
On December 12, 2025, head coach Chris Fisk was hired for the same position at FCS Portland State. On December 30, Scott Power, who previously served as the Wildcats' defensive coordinator in 2016 and 2017, was named Central Washington's new head coach.

== Preseason ==
=== LSC media poll ===
The Lone Star Conference released its preseason prediction poll on July 23, 2026. The Wildcats were predicted to finish first in the conference.

=== LSC players to watch ===
Linebacker Brycen Indell was named the Lone Star Conference Preseason Defensive Player of the Year. Indell was also included on the LSC's "Preseason Defensive Players to Watch" list, while offensive lineman Tyler Luzan was included on the "Preseason Offensive Players to Watch" list.

== Game summaries ==
=== At Cal Poly (FCS) ===
No. 6 Central Washington Wildcats at Cal Poly Mustangs (FCS) – Game summary

Quarter	1	2	3	4	Total
No. 6 Wildcats	7	0	0	10	17
Mustangs (FCS)	0	17	7	0	24

at Mustang Memorial Field, San Luis Obispo, California

- Date: September 5
- Game time: 5:00 p.m. PDT
- Game weather: Sunny, 76 °F (24 °C)
- Game attendance: 8,034
- Referee: Jim Crowley
- TV: ESPN+
- Box score, Recap

Game information
First quarter
- CWU – Justin Brennan 1-yard run (David Weber kick), 1:47. Wildcats 7–0. Drive: 16 plays, 85 yards, 9:24.

Second quarter

- CP – Ray Hall 55-yard pass from Anthony Grigsby Jr. (Noah Thayer kick), 10:58. Tied 7–7. Drive: 1 play, 55 yards, 0:07.
- CP – Fidel Pitts 4-yard pass from Anthony Grigsby Jr. (Noah Thayer kick), 6:47. Mustangs 14–7. Drive: 5 plays, 53 yards, 1:59.
- CP – Noah Thayer 33-yard field goal, 0:00. Mustangs 17–7. Drive: 6 plays, 58 yards, 0:38.

Third quarter

- CP – Ray Hall 35-yard pass from Anthony Grigsby Jr. (Noah Thayer kick), 14:12. Mustangs 24–7. Drive: 2 plays, 35 yards, 0:37.

Fourth quarter

- CWU – Mason Juergens 9-yard pass from Justin Brennan (David Weber kick), 11:06. Mustangs 24–14. Drive: 9 plays, 80 yards, 5:14.
- CWU – David Weber 23-yard field goal, 1:49. Mustangs 24–17. Drive: 12 plays, 66 yards, 4:41.

Statistics	CWU	CP
First downs	23	19
Total yards	430	384
Rushing yards	168	180
Passing yards	262	204
Turnovers	2	0
Time of possession	36:06	23:53

Team	Category	Player	Statistics
Central Washington	Passing	Justin Brennan	25/36, 262 yards, TD, INT
Central Washington	Rushing	Ryder Bumgarner	21 rushes, 99 yards
Central Washington	Receiving	Mason Juergens	10 receptions, 114 yards, TD
Cal Poly	Passing	Anthony Grigsby Jr.	15/27, 204 yards, 3 TD
Cal Poly	Rushing	Jaden Green	13 rushes, 94 yards
Cal Poly	Receiving	Ray Hall	5 receptions, 125 yards, 2 TD

=== No. 1 Ferris State ===
No. 1 Ferris State Bulldogs at No. 9 Central Washington Wildcats – Game summary

Quarter	1	2	3	4	Total
No. 1 Bulldogs	14	7	0	7	28
No. 9 Wildcats	0	14	0	0	14

at Tomlinson Stadium, Ellensburg, Washington

- Date: September 12
- Game time: 6:00 p.m. PDT
- Game weather: Cloudy, 68 °F (20 °C)
- Game attendance: 4,889
- Referee: Jerry Springer
- Box score, Recap

Game information
First quarter
- FSU – Wyatt Bower 1-yard run (Jay Cady kick), 11:52. Bulldogs 7–0. Drive: 3 plays, 52 yards, 1:05.
- FSU – Zak Ahern 17-yard run (Jay Cady kick), 4:21. Bulldogs 14–0. Drive: 10 plays, 93 yards, 4:26.

Second quarter

- CWU – Isaac Torres 9-yard pass from Justin Brennan (David Weber kick), 13:41. Bulldogs 14–7. Drive: 11 plays, 75 yards, 5:40.
- FSU – Wyatt Bower 3-yard run (Jay Cady kick), 9:37. Bulldogs 21–7. Drive: 9 plays, 75 yards, 4:04.
- CWU – Stephen Woodward 2-yard pass from Justin Brennan (David Weber kick), 0:08. Bulldogs 21–14. Drive: 13 plays, 80 yards, 6:35.

Third quarter

- No scoring plays

Fourth quarter

- FSU – Wyatt Bower 43-yard run (Jay Cady kick), 12:32. Bulldogs 28–14. Drive: 8 plays, 99 yards, 3:37.

Statistics	FSU	CWU
First downs	23	18
Total yards	480	347
Rushing yards	308	144
Passing yards	172	203
Turnovers	2	0
Time of possession	25:17	34:43

Team	Category	Player	Statistics
Ferris State	Passing	Wyatt Bower	8/15, 172 yards
Ferris State	Rushing	Wyatt Bower	20 rushes, 124 yards, 3 TD
Ferris State	Receiving	Jaylin Townsend	3 receptions, 89 yards
Central Washington	Passing	Justin Brennan	23/29, 203 yards, 2 TD
Central Washington	Rushing	Antoine Lee	12 rushes, 82 yards
Central Washington	Receiving	Mason Juergens	13 receptions, 134 yards

=== No. 10 Western Oregon ===
No. 10 Western Oregon at No. 16 Central Washington Wildcats – Game summary

Quarter	1	2	3	4	Total
No. 10 Wolves	10	14	0	12	36
No. 16 Wildcats	0	17	14	14	45

at Tomlinson Stadium, Ellensburg, Washington

- Date: September 19
- Game time: 6:00 p.m. PDT
- Game weather: Sunny, 78 °F (26 °C)
- Game attendance: 5,199
- Referee: Brett Sledge
- Box score, Recap

Game information
First quarter
- WOU – Ashton Wolff 41-yard field goal, 10:20. Wolves 3–0. Drive: 10 plays, 51 yards, 4:40.
- WOU – Jermaine Land 29-yard run (Ashton Wolff kick), 1:46. Wolves 10–0. Drive: 4 plays, 62 yards, 1:41.

Second quarter

- CWU – David Weber 24-yard field goal, 11:58. Wolves 10–3. Drive: 6 plays, 14 yards, 2:52.
- WOU – Tyler Konold 13-yard pass from Jordan McCarty (Ashton Wolff kick), 6:56. Wolves 17–3. Drive: 10 plays, 75 yards, 5:02.
- CWU – Isaac Torres 45-yard pass from Justin Brennan (David Weber kick), 5:35. Wolves 17–10. Drive: 3 plays, 60 yards, 1:21.
- WOU – Jaydan Burns 46-yard pass from Jordan McCarty (Ashton Wolff kick), 2:24. Wolves 24–10. Drive: 7 plays, 75 yards, 3:11.
- CWU – Isaac Torres 32-yard pass from Justin Brennan (David Weber kick), 0:22. Wolves 24–17. Drive: 8 plays, 81 yards, 1:55.

Third quarter

- CWU – Ryder Bumgarner 1-yard run (David Weber kick), 9:25. Tied 24–24. Drive: 7 plays, 74 yards, 2:43.
- CWU – Stephen Woodward 2-yard pass from Justin Brennan (David Weber kick), 3:20. Wildcats 31–24. Drive: 6 plays, 34 yards, 2:25.

Fourth quarter

- WOU – Tyler Konold 18-yard pass from Jordan McCarty (kick failed), 12:20. Wildcats 31–30. Drive: 11 plays, 75 yards, 6:00.
- CWU – Wiley Donnerberg 28-yard pass from Justin Brennan (David Weber kick), 10:43. Wildcats 38–30. Drive: 3 plays, 71 yards, 1:32.
- WOU – Terayon Sweet 1-yard run (pass failed), 4:57. Wildcats 38–36. Drive: 10 plays, 75 yards, 5:46.
- CWU – Ryder Bumgarner 2-yard run (David Weber kick), 1:32. Wildcats 45–36. Drive: 8 plays, 71 yards, 3:18.

Statistics	WOU	CWU
First downs	28	17
Total yards	449	418
Rushing yards	243	104
Passing yards	206	314
Turnovers	3	0
Time of possession	35:30	24:30

Team	Category	Player	Statistics
Western Oregon	Passing	Jordan McCarty	17/28, 206 yards, 3 TD, 2 INT
Western Oregon	Rushing	Jordan McCarty	23 rushes, 122 yards
Western Oregon	Receiving	Jaydan Burns	2 receptions, 61 yards, TD
Central Washington	Passing	Justin Brennan	19/26, 314 yards, 4 TD
Central Washington	Rushing	Antione Lee	2 rushes, 46 yards
Central Washington	Receiving	Mason Juergens	7 receptions, 134 yards

=== Sul Ross ===
Sul Ross Lobos at No. 14 Central Washington Wildcats – Game summary

Quarter	1	2	3	4	Total
Lobos	13	9	0	0	22
No. 14 Wildcats	16	24	7	14	61

at Tomlinson Stadium, Ellensburg, Washington

- Date: September 26
- Game time: 6:00 p.m. PDT
- Game weather: Sunny, 63 °F (17 °C)
- Game attendance: 4,877
- Referee: Tremain Williams
- Box score, Recap

Game information
First quarter
- CWU – Ryder Bumgarner 21-yard run (kick failed), 14:42. Wildcats 6–0. Drive: 2 plays, 21 yards, 0:15.
- SRS – Will Howell 22-yard run (kick failed), 12:36. Tied 6–6. Drive: 9 plays, 75 yards, 2:06.
- CWU – David Weber 38-yard field goal, 10:15. Wildcats 9–6. Drive: 6 plays, 47 yards, 2:14.
- CWU – Ryder Bumgarner 6-yard run (David Weber kick), 6:12. Wildcats 16–6. Drive: 6 plays, 73 yards, 3:13.
- SRS – Aaron Martinez 2-yard pass from Will Howell (Marcos Garcia kick), 1:09. Wildcats 16–13. Drive: 12 plays, 75 yards, 5:03.

Second quarter

- CWU – Antoine Lee 2-yard run (David Weber kick), 12:43. Wildcats 23–13. Drive: 6 plays, 67 yards, 3:19.
- SRS – Marcos Garcia 24-yard field goal, 6:50. Wildcats 23–16. Drive: 13 plays, 70 yards, 4:30.
- CWU – Ki'Marree Washington 12-yard run (David Weber kick), 5:48. Wildcats 30–16. Drive: 3 plays, 60 yards, 0:52.
- CWU – Samaje Featherstone 6-yard pass from Justin Brennan (David Weber kick), 3:06. Wildcats 37–16. Drive: 3 plays, 29 yards, 0:39.
- SRS – Ronald Bell 10-yard pass from Will Howell (kick failed), 0:41. Wildcats 37–22. Drive: 11 plays, 75 yards, 2:25.
- CWU – David Weber 39-yard field goal, 0:00. Wildcats 40–22. Drive: 6 plays, 43 yards, 0:34.

Third quarter

- CWU – Ryder Bumgarner 1-yard run (David Weber kick), 11:36. Wildcats 47–22. Drive: 7 plays, 65 yards, 3:19.

Fourth quarter

- CWU – Peyton Cunningham 35-yard interception return (Austin Ferencz kick), 14:05. Wildcats 54–22.
- CWU – Chance Webster 5-yard run (Austin Ferencz kick), 7:49. Wildcats 61–22. Drive: 10 plays, 79 yards, 4:18.

Statistics	SRS	CWU
First downs	23	31
Total yards	269	620
Rushing yards	143	443
Passing yards	126	177
Turnovers	3	1
Time of possession	25:13	34:47

Team	Category	Player	Statistics
Sul Ross	Passing	Will Howell	15/35, 108 yards, 2 TD, INT
Sul Ross	Rushing	Will Howell	12 rushes, 84 yards, TD
Sul Ross	Receiving	Taribbean Ramirez	7 receptions, 51 yards
Central Washington	Passing	Justin Brennan	9/15, 115 yards, TD
Central Washington	Rushing	Ryder Bumgarner	14 rushes, 196 yards, 3 TD
Central Washington	Receiving	A. J. Perez	2 receptions, 62 yards

=== At Angelo State ===
No. 12 Central Washington Wildcats at Angelo State Rams – Game summary

Quarter	1	2	3	4	Total
No. 12 Wildcats	6	21	0	14	41
Rams	0	7	0	7	14

at LeGrand Sports Complex, San Angelo, Texas

- Date: October 3
- Game time: 5:00 p.m. PDT / 7:00 p.m. CDT
- Game weather: Cloudy, 74 °F (23 °C)
- Game attendance: 2,112
- Referee: Andy Dunklin
- Box score, Recap

Game information
First quarter
- CWU – Ryder Bumgarner 1-yard run (kick failed), 2:02. Wildcats 6–0. Drive: 8 plays, 70 yards, 3:58.

Second quarter

- CWU – A. J. Perez 29-yard pass from Justin Brennan (David Weber kick), 10:37. Wildcats 13–0. Drive: 3 plays, 63 yards, 1:52.
- CWU – Justin Brennan 76-yard run (David Weber kick), 5:26. Wildcats 20–0. Drive: 1 play, 76 yards, 0:12.
- CWU – A. J. Perez 30-yard pass from Justin Brennan (David Weber kick), 4:49. Wildcats 27–0. Drive: 1 play, 30 yards, 0:07.
- ASU – Ashton Dickens 59-yard run (Paden Maass kick), 0:25. Wildcats 27–7. Drive: 3 plays, 67 yards, 0:35.

Third quarter

- No scoring plays

Fourth quarter

- CWU – Justin Brennan 1-yard run (David Weber kick), 12:52. Wildcats 34–7. Drive: 11 plays, 72 yards, 5:51.
- ASU – Ayden Arp 1-yard run (Paden Maass kick), 8:50. Wildcats 34–14. Drive: 10 plays, 75 yards, 4:02.
- CWU – Wiley Donnerberg 2-yard pass from Justin Brennan (David Weber kick), 5:02. Wildcats 41–14. Drive: 7 plays, 25 yards, 3:37.

Statistics	CWU	ASU
First downs	19	22
Total yards	476	420
Rushing yards	231	264
Passing yards	245	156
Turnovers	1	4
Time of possession	30:09	29:51

Team	Category	Player	Statistics
Central Washington	Passing	Justin Brennan	17/23, 245 yards, 3 TD
Central Washington	Rushing	Ryder Bumgarner	21 rushes, 108 yards, TD
Central Washington	Receiving	Isaac Torres	4 receptions, 101 yards
Angelo State	Passing	Ayden Arp	15/26, 156 yards, 2 INT
Angelo State	Rushing	Ashton Dickens	16 rushes, 102 yards, TD
Angelo State	Receiving	Alan Dobbins	6 receptions, 49 yards

=== Midwestern State ===
Midwestern State Mustangs at No. 13 Central Washington Wildcats – Game summary

Quarter	1	2	3	4	Total
Mustangs	7	14	0	8	29
No. 13 Wildcats	14	17	6	7	44

at Tomlinson Stadium, Ellensburg, Washington

- Date: October 10
- Game time: 6:00 p.m. PDT
- Game weather: Rain, 49 °F (9 °C)
- Game attendance: 5,983
- Referee: Jerry Springer
- Box score, Recap

Game information
First quarter
- CWU – Isaac Torres 5-yard pass from Justin Brennan (David Weber kick), 11:06. Wildcats 7–0. Drive: 5 plays, 51 yards, 2:02.
- MSU – Dominic Cox 6-yard pass from Kaden Brown (Ryan Ostboe kick), 5:35. Tied 7–7. Drive: 13 plays, 75 yards, 5:31.
- CWU – Ryder Bumgarner 2-yard run (David Weber kick), 1:33. Wildcats 14–7. Drive: 7 plays, 74 yards, 3:57.

Second quarter

- MSU – Dexter Stigall IV 1-yard pass from Kaden Brown (Ryan Ostboe kick), 13:15. Tied 14–14. Drive: 8 plays, 75 yards, 3:18.
- CWU – Ryder Bumgarner 5-yard run (David Weber kick), 6:54. Wildcats 21–14. Drive: 12 plays, 81 yards, 6:13.
- MSU – Joseph Dodds 3-yard run (Ryan Ostboe kick), 6:14. Tied 21–21. Drive: 4 plays, 75 yards, 0:40.
- CWU – Isaac Torres 41-yard pass from Justin Brennan (David Weber kick), 2:10. Wildcats 28–21. Drive: 9 plays, 75 yards, 4:04.
- CWU – David Weber 47-yard field goal, 0:00. Wildcats 31–21. Drive: 7 plays, 25 yards, 0:52.

Third quarter

- CWU – Ryder Bumgarner 1-yard run (kick blocked), 11:24. Wildcats 37–21. Drive: 8 plays, 81 yards, 3:30.

Fourth quarter

- CWU – Justin Brennan 3-yard run (David Weber kick), 12:51. Wildcats 44–21. Drive: 7 plays, 81 yards, 3:41.
- MSU – Ace Traylor 11-yard run (Kaden Brown pass to Case Peacock), 3:11. Wildcats 44–29. Drive: 7 plays, 70 yards, 2:40.

Statistics	MSU	CWU
First downs	22	25
Total yards	370	506
Rushing yards	132	207
Passing yards	238	299
Turnovers	3	1
Time of possession	24:50	35:10

Team	Category	Player	Statistics
Midwestern State	Passing	Kaden Brown	23/37, 238 yards, 2 TD, 2 INT
Midwestern State	Rushing	Joseph Dodds	16 rushes, 114 yards, TD
Midwestern State	Receiving	Malakai Matthews	1 reception, 52 yards
Central Washington	Passing	Justin Brennan	20/29, 299 yards, 2 TD, INT
Central Washington	Rushing	Ryder Bumgarner	22 rushes, 89 yards, 3 TD
Central Washington	Receiving	Isaac Torres	8 receptions, 182 yards, 2 TD

=== At Texas A&M–Kingsville ===
No. 11 Central Washington Wildcats at Texas A&M–Kingsville Javelinas – Game summary

Quarter	1	2	3	4	Total
No. 11 Wildcats	14	21	14	3	52
Javelinas	3	17	14	15	49

at Javelina Stadium, Kingsville, Texas

- Date: October 17
- Game time: 5:00 p.m. PDT / 7:00 p.m. CDT
- Game weather: Sunny, 64 °F (18 °C)
- Game attendance: 4,350
- Box score, Recap

Game information
First quarter
- TMK – Daniel Guana 32-yard field goal, 10:12. Javelinas 3–0. Drive: 7 plays, 26 yards, 2:01.
- CWU – Ryder Bumgarner 38-yard run (David Weber kick), 6:02. Wildcats 7–3. Drive: 9 plays, 90 yards, 4:02.
- CWU – Ryder Bumgarner 1-yard run (David Weber kick), 1:02. Wildcats 14–3. Drive: 8 plays, 60 yards, 4:30.

Second quarter

- TMK – Mills Dawson 5-yard run (Daniel Guana kick), 13:53. Wildcats 14–10. Drive: 6 plays, 75 yards, 2:09.
- CWU – Antoine Lee 6-yard run (David Weber kick), 9:38. Wildcats 21–10. Drive: 10 plays, 60 yards, 4:07.
- CWU – Ryder Bumgarner 18-yard run (David Weber kick), 9:25. Wildcats 28–10. Drive: 1 play, 18 yards, 0:09.
- TMK – Daniel Guana 24-yard field goal, 5:06. Wildcats 28–13. Drive: 11 plays, 67 yards, 4:19.
- CWU – Ryder Bumgarner 3-yard run (David Weber kick), 1:53. Wildcats 35–13. Drive: 7 plays, 68 yards, 3:08.
- TMK – Christian Kretz 15-yard pass from Mills Dawson (Daniel Guana kick), 0:05. Wildcats 35–20. Drive: 3 plays, 18 yards, 0:29.

Third quarter

- TMK – Christian Kretz 80-yard pass from Mills Dawson (Daniel Guana kick), 12:53. Wildcats 35–27. Drive: 1 play, 80 yards, 0:12.
- CWU – Ryder Bumgarner 4-yard run (David Weber kick), 10:57. Wildcats 42–27. Drive: 4 plays, 48 yards, 1:53.
- TMK – Kenhide Atunrase 2-yard pass from Mills Dawson (Daniel Guana kick), 7:32. Wildcats 42–34. Drive: 9 plays, 82 yards, 3:20.
- CWU – Isaac Torres 26-yard pass from Justin Brennan (David Weber kick), 4:04. Wildcats 49–34. Drive: 7 plays, 66 yards, 3:22.

Fourth quarter

- TMK – Marquis Singleton 1-yard pass from Mills Dawson (Mills Dawson pass to Christian Kretz), 11:08. Wildcats 49–42. Drive: 9 plays, 70 yards, 4:01.
- TMK – Levi Fontenot 40-yard run (Daniel Guana kick), 7:37. Tied 49–49. Drive: 5 plays, 85 yards, 1:28.
- CWU – David Weber 32-yard field goal, 1:48. Wildcats 52–49. Drive: 13 plays, 59 yards, 5:42.

Statistics	CWU	TMK
First downs	31	25
Total yards	495	557
Rushing yards	325	161
Passing yards	170	396
Turnovers	1	3
Time of possession	38:06	21:54

Team	Category	Player	Statistics
Central Washington	Passing	Justin Brennan	19/27, 170 yards, TD
Central Washington	Rushing	Ryder Bumgarner	27 rushes, 165 yards, 5 TD
Central Washington	Receiving	Mason Juergens	9 receptions, 60 yards
Texas A&M–Kingsville	Passing	Mills Dawson	19/30, 396 yards, 4 TD, 2 INT
Texas A&M–Kingsville	Rushing	Levi Fontenot	30 rushes, 167 yards, TD
Texas A&M–Kingsville	Receiving	Christian Kretz	6 receptions, 218 yards, 2 TD

=== UT Permian Basin ===
UT Permian Basin Falcons at No. 13 Central Washington Wildcats – Game summary

Quarter	1	2	3	4	Total
Falcons	0	6	0	7	13
No. 13 Wildcats	14	7	7	14	42

at Tomlinson Stadium, Ellensburg, Washington

- Date: October 24
- Game time: 6:00 p.m. PDT
- Game weather: Clear, 48 °F (9 °C)
- Game attendance: 5,947
- Referee: Daniel Mena
- Box score, Recap

Game information
First quarter
- CWU – Mason Juergens 15-yard pass from Justin Brennan (David Weber kick), 7:29. Wildcats 7–0. Drive: 10 plays, 70 yards, 4:08.
- CWU – Justin Brennan 1-yard run (David Weber kick), 0:11. Wildcats 14–0. Drive: 11 plays, 58 yards, 5:46.

Second quarter

- CWU – Ryder Bumgarner 13-yard run (David Weber kick), 1:43. Wildcats 21–0. Drive: 7 plays, 44 yards, 2:43.
- UTPB – Traylen Suel 3-yard pass from Braxton Baker (kick failed), 0:05. Wildcats 21–6. Drive: 9 plays, 75 yards, 1:38.

Third quarter

- CWU – Isaac Torres 26-yard pass from Justin Brennan (David Weber kick), 9:35. Wildcats 28–6. Drive: 10 plays, 69 yards, 5:20.

Fourth quarter

- UTPB – J. T. Seagraves 6-yard pass from Braxton Baker (Diego Chavarria kick), 12:10. Wildcats 28–13. Drive: 9 plays, 80 yards, 3:16.
- CWU – Omar Lazcano 75-yard interception return (David Weber kick), 5:40. Wildcats 35–13.
- CWU – Ryder Bumgarner 11-yard run (David Weber kick), 0:15. Wildcats 42–13. Drive: 7 plays, 39 yards, 4:38.

Statistics	UTPB	CWU
First downs	18	26
Total yards	290	359
Rushing yards	114	191
Passing yards	176	168
Turnovers	1	1
Time of possession	23:42	36:07

Team	Category	Player	Statistics
UT Permian Basin	Passing	Braxton Baker	14/25, 168 yards, 2 TD, INT
UT Permian Basin	Rushing	Cheno Navarrette	12 rushes, 63 yards
UT Permian Basin	Receiving	Traylen Suel	4 receptions, 56 yards, TD
Central Washington	Passing	Justin Brennan	17/26, 168 yards, 2 TD, INT
Central Washington	Rushing	Ryder Bumgarner	25 rushes, 113 yards, 2 TD
Central Washington	Receiving	Mason Juergens	7 receptions, 64 yards, TD

=== At Eastern New Mexico ===
No. 12 Central Washington Wildcats at Eastern New Mexico Greyhounds – Game summary

Quarter	1	2	3	4	Total
No. 12 Wildcats	7	14	21	7	49
Greyhounds	6	0	7	7	20

at Steve Loy Family Foundation Stadium, Portales, New Mexico

- Date: October 31
- Game time: 1:00 p.m. PDT / 2:00 p.m. MDT
- Game weather: Cloudy, 67 °F (19 °C)
- Game attendance: 1,580
- Referee: Jason Hickey
- Box score, Recap

Game information
First quarter
- ENM – Xavier Johnson 4-yard pass from Clifton Cooper (kick blocked), 10:27. Greyhounds 6–0. Drive: 13 plays, 75 yards, 4:33.
- CWU – Ryder Bumgarner 2-yard run (David Weber kick), 4:35. Wildcats 7–6. Drive: 12 plays, 65 yards, 5:48.

Second quarter

- CWU – Isaac Torres 25-yard pass from Justin Brennan (David Weber kick), 13:09. Wildcats 14–6. Drive: 7 plays, 60 yards, 3:59.
- CWU – Ryder Bumgarner 5-yard run (David Weber kick), 7:04. Wildcats 21–6. Drive: 4 plays, 76 yards, 1:53.

Third quarter

- CWU – Mason Juergens 18-yard pass from Justin Brennan (David Weber kick), 11:24. Wildcats 28–6. Drive: 7 plays, 57 yards, 3:32.
- ENM – Emeka Megwa 15-yard run (Kaden Dow kick), 9:03. Wildcats 28–13. Drive: 7 plays, 75 yards, 2:21.
- CWU – Mason Juergens 20-yard pass from Justin Brennan (David Weber kick), 4:48. Wildcats 35–13. Drive: 8 plays, 75 yards, 4:15.
- CWU – Justice Taylor 1-yard run (David Weber kick), 0:49. Wildcats 42–13. Drive: 5 plays, 15 yards, 2:45.

Fourth quarter

- CWU – Antoine Lee 58-yard run (David Weber kick), 9:09. Wildcats 49–13. Drive: 3 plays, 75 yards, 1:33.
- ENM – Trei Kibbles 37-yard pass from Clifton Cooper (Kaden Dow kick), 6:14. Wildcats 49–20. Drive: 8 plays, 70 yards, 2:55.

Statistics	CWU	ENM
First downs	29	27
Total yards	600	427
Rushing yards	301	179
Passing yards	299	248
Turnovers	0	2
Time of possession	33:33	26:27

Team	Category	Player	Statistics
Central Washington	Passing	Justin Brennan	12/13, 290 yards, 2 TD
Central Washington	Rushing	Ryder Bumgarner	24 rushes, 132 yards, 2 TD
Central Washington	Receiving	A. J. Perez	3 receptions, 123 yards
Eastern New Mexico	Passing	Clifton Cooper	26/40, 248 yards, 2 TD, 2 INT
Eastern New Mexico	Rushing	Clifton Cooper	17 rushes, 82 yards
Eastern New Mexico	Receiving	Darwin Parker	10 receptions, 106 yards

=== Western New Mexico ===
Western New Mexico Mustangs at No. 9 Central Washington Wildcats – Game summary

Quarter	1	2	3	4	Total
Mustangs	3	0	0	7	10
No. 9 Wildcats	17	7	21	7	52

at Tomlinson Stadium, Ellensburg, Washington

- Date: November 7
- Game time: 1:00 p.m. PST
- Game weather: Cloudy, 52 °F (11 °C)
- Game attendance: 5,001
- Referee: Tremain Williams
- Box score, Recap

Game information
First quarter
- CWU – Cale Allen 24-yard interception return (David Weber kick), 14:54. Wildcats 7–0.
- CWU – Isaac Torres 62-yard pass from Justin Brennan (David Weber kick), 11:21. Wildcats 14–0. Drive: 4 plays, 75 yards, 1:51.
- WNM – Nathan Flores 32-yard field goal, 5:01. Wildcats 14–3. Drive: 11 plays, 61 yards, 6:20.
- CWU – David Weber 30-yard field goal, 1:23. Wildcats 17–3. Drive: 8 plays, 48 yards, 3:32.

Second quarter

- CWU – Isaac Torres 24-yard pass from Justin Brennan (David Weber kick), 0:23. Wildcats 24–3. Drive: 8 plays, 90 yards, 3:47.

Third quarter

- CWU – Isaac Torres 9-yard pass from Justin Brennan (David Weber kick), 11:40. Wildcats 31–3. Drive: 7 plays, 73 yards, 3:18.
- CWU – Isaac Torres 51-yard pass from Justin Brennan (David Weber kick), 11:30. Wildcats 38–3. Drive: 1 play, 51 yards, 0:09.
- CWU – Stephen Woodward 4-yard pass from Justin Brennan (David Weber kick), 0:56. Wildcats 45–3. Drive: 5 plays, 65 yards, 2:30.

Fourth quarter

- WNM – Rene Huerta Jr. 12-yard pass from Kainan Manna (Nathan Flores kick), 9:30. Wildcats 45–10. Drive: 11 plays, 75 yards, 6:26.
- CWU – Justice Taylor 1-yard run (David Weber kick), 4:44. Wildcats 52–10. Drive: 2 plays, 75 yards, 0:42.

Statistics	WNM	CWU
First downs	14	21
Total yards	266	578
Rushing yards	188	338
Passing yards	78	240
Turnovers	2	1
Time of possession	34:52	25:08

Team	Category	Player	Statistics
Western New Mexico	Passing	Kainan Manna	8/15, 78 yards, TD, 2 INT
Western New Mexico	Rushing	Devon Nofoa-Masoe	29 rushes, 147 yards
Western New Mexico	Receiving	Gavin Placencio	4 receptions, 37 yards
Central Washington	Passing	Justin Brennan	11/16, 240 yards, 5 TD, INT
Central Washington	Rushing	Ryder Bumgarner	12 rushes, 143 yards
Central Washington	Receiving	Isaac Torres	8 receptions, 220 yards, 4 TD

=== At West Texas A&M ===
No. 8 Central Washington Wildcats at West Texas A&M Buffaloes – Game summary

Quarter	1	2	3	4	Total
No. 8 Wildcats	3	21	13	14	51
Buffaloes	0	0	7	7	14

at Bain–Schaeffer Buffalo Stadium, Canyon, Texas

- Date: November 14
- Game time: 12:00 p.m. PST / 2:00 p.m. CST
- Game weather: Sunny
- Game attendance: 3,324
- Referee: Esrael Silva
- Box score, Recap

Game information
First quarter
- CWU – David Weber 45-yard field goal, 10:04. Wildcats 3–0. Drive: 8 plays, 5 yards, 3:36.

Second quarter

- CWU – Ryder Bumgarner 1-yard run (David Weber kick), 12:31. Wildcats 10–0. Drive: 10 plays, 57 yards, 5:03.
- CWU – Antoine Lee 1-yard run (David Weber kick), 10:08. Wildcats 17–0. Drive: 5 plays, 14 yards, 2:04.
- CWU – Ryder Bumgarner 4-yard run (David Weber kick), 0:40. Wildcats 24–0. Drive: 13 plays, 85 yards, 5:12.

Third quarter

- CWU – Antoine Lee 47-yard run (David Weber kick), 13:05. Wildcats 31–0. Drive: 4 plays, 70 yards, 1:48.
- WT – Trace Clarkson 73-yard pass from Ryan Gafford (Alan Anaya kick), 12:48. Wildcats 31–7. Drive: 1 play, 73 yards, 0:11.
- CWU – Ryder Bumgarner 1-yard run (kick blocked), 6:47. Wildcats 37–7. Drive: 13 plays, 75 yards, 6:01.

Fourth quarter

- CWU – Ki'Marree Washington 47-yard run (David Weber kick), 11:44. Wildcats 44–7. Drive: 10 plays, 80 yards, 5:35.
- CWU – Ki'Marree Washington 25-yard run (David Weber kick), 10:52. Wildcats 51–7. Drive: 2 plays, 24 yards, 0:44.
- WT – Antoine Sullivan 15-yard pass from Ryan Gafford (Alan Anaya kick), 7:23. Wildcats 51–14. Drive: 10 plays, 75 yards, 3:29.

Statistics	CWU	WT
First downs	28	15
Total yards	409	287
Rushing yards	385	18
Passing yards	24	269
Turnovers	0	5
Time of possession	29:41	30:19

Team	Category	Player	Statistics
Central Washington	Passing	Justin Brennan	3/6, 24 yards
Central Washington	Rushing	Ryder Bumgarner	27 rushes, 149 yards, 3 TD
Central Washington	Receiving	Mason Juergens	1 reception, 11 yards
West Texas A&M	Passing	Ryan Gafford	18/32, 240 yards, 2 TD, 2 INT
West Texas A&M	Rushing	Tyreke Lewis	7 rushes, 21 yards
West Texas A&M	Receiving	Trace Clarkson	7 receptions, 110 yards, TD

=== No. 8 Western Colorado (NCAA Division II First Round) ===
2026 NCAA Division II Playoffs First Round
No. 8 Western Colorado Mountaineers at No. 7 Central Washington Wildcats – Game summary

Quarter	1	2	3	4	Total
No. 8 Mountaineers	3	7	0	7	17
No. 7 Wildcats	3	0	13	8	24

at Tomlinson Stadium, Ellensburg, Washington

- Date: November 21
- Game time: 1:00 p.m. PST
- Game weather: Cloudy, 37 °F (3 °C)
- Game attendance: 4,221
- Referee: John Adams
- TV: ESPN+
- Box score, Recap

Game information
First quarter
- WCU – J. T. Miller 23-yard field goal, 10:14. Mountaineers 3–0. Drive: 8 plays, 56 yards, 3:28.
- CWU – David Weber 22-yard field goal, 5:16. Tied 3–3. Drive: 9 plays, 70 yards, 4:50.

Second quarter

- WCU – Lamonte James 6-yard run (J. T. Miller kick), 1:56. Mountaineers 10–3. Drive: 5 plays, 48 yards, 2:19.

Third quarter

- CWU – Ryder Bumgarner 10-yard run (David Weber kick), 7:41. Tied 10–10. Drive: 9 plays, 70 yards, 4:28.
- CWU – Wiley Donnerberg 50-yard pass from Justin Brennan (run failed), 4:19. Wildcats 16–10. Drive: 5 plays, 61 yards, 2:07.

Fourth quarter

- CWU – Ryder Bumgarner 50-yard run (Justin Brennan pass to Wiley Donnerberg), 13:20. Wildcats 24–10. Drive: 7 plays, 82 yards, 2:35.
- WCU – Damien Nevil 1-yard run (J. T. Miller kick), 10:05. Wildcats 24–17. Drive: 11 plays, 74 yards, 3:08.

Statistics	WCU	CWU
First downs	21	18
Total yards	381	350
Rushing yards	174	155
Passing yards	207	195
Turnovers	1	0
Time of possession	32:18	27:42

Team	Category	Player	Statistics
Western Colorado	Passing	Josiah Roy	24/40, 207 yards, INT
Western Colorado	Rushing	Damien Nevil	14 rushes, 56 yards, TD
Western Colorado	Receiving	D. J. Allen Jr.	9 receptions, 94 yards
Central Washington	Passing	Justin Brennan	13/19, 195 yards, TD
Central Washington	Rushing	Ryder Bumgarner	29 rushes, 151 yards, 2 TD
Central Washington	Receiving	Mason Juergens	6 receptions, 60 yards

=== At No. 3 CSU Pueblo (NCAA Divison II Second Round) ===
2026 NCAA Division II Playoffs Second Round
No. 7 Central Washington Wildcats at No. 3 CSU Pueblo ThunderWolves – Game summary

Quarter	1	2	3	4	Total
No. 7 Wildcats	0	0	0	0	0
No. 3 ThunderWolves	0	0	0	0	0

at ThunderBowl, Pueblo, Colorado

- Date: November 28
- Game time: 11:00 a.m. PST / 12:00 p.m. MST
- TV: ESPN+

Statistics	CWU	CSUP
First downs		
Total yards		
Rushing yards		
Passing yards		
Turnovers		
Time of possession		

Team	Category	Player	Statistics
Central Washington	Passing		
Central Washington	Rushing		
Central Washington	Receiving		
CSU Pueblo	Passing		
CSU Pueblo	Rushing		
CSU Pueblo	Receiving		
