= 1931 Valentine earthquake =

Most powerful earthquake in Texas history

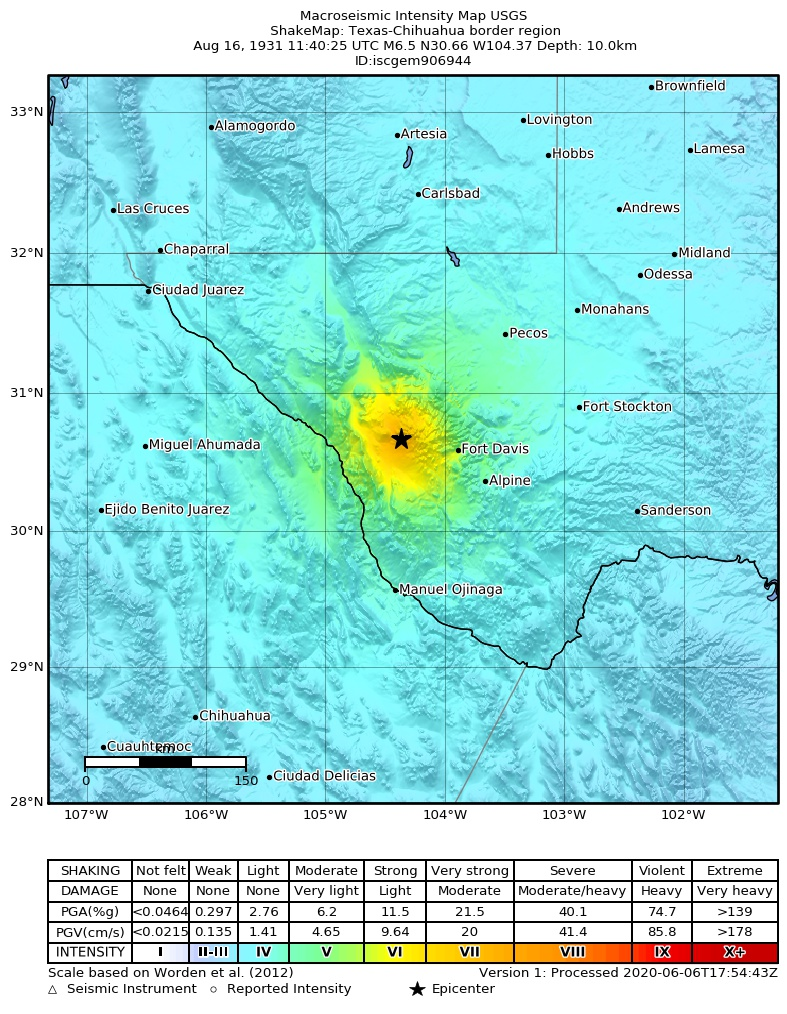
- USGS ShakeMap

- Location within Texas
- UTC time: 1931-08-16 11:40:25
- ISC event: 906944
- USGS-ANSS: ComCat
- Local date: August 16, 1931
- Local time: 05:40 CST (UTC−06:00)
- Magnitude: mb 5.8 – 6.4
- Depth: 10 km (6.2 mi)
- Epicenter: 30.502°N 104.575°W (USGS); 30.66°N 104.37°W (ISC–GEM)
- Type: Oblique-slip
- Areas affected: Southwestern U.S., Northern Mexico
- Total damage: $50,000–$75,000 (1931 USD)
- Max. intensity: MMI VIII (Severe)
- Casualties: No fatalities

In the early morning hours of August 16, 1931, a powerful earthquake occurred in West Texas with a maximum Mercalli intensity of VIII (Severe). Estimates of its magnitude range between 5.8 and 6.4 m_{b}, making it the most powerful earthquake ever recorded in Texas history. Its epicenter was near the town of Valentine, Texas; there, the earthquake caused damage to many homes and buildings. The earthquake may have been caused by movement along oblique-slip faulting in West Texas, the most seismically active region in the state. Shaking from the earthquake was perceptible within a 400 mi (640 km) radius of the epicenter, affecting four U.S. states and northern Mexico. Several foreshocks and aftershocks accompanied the primary temblor, with the aftershocks continuing until at least November 3, 1931. The main earthquake caused no fatalities, though several people sustained minor injuries; the damage in Valentine amounted to $50,000–$75,000 ($962,195–$1,443,293 today).

== Geology ==
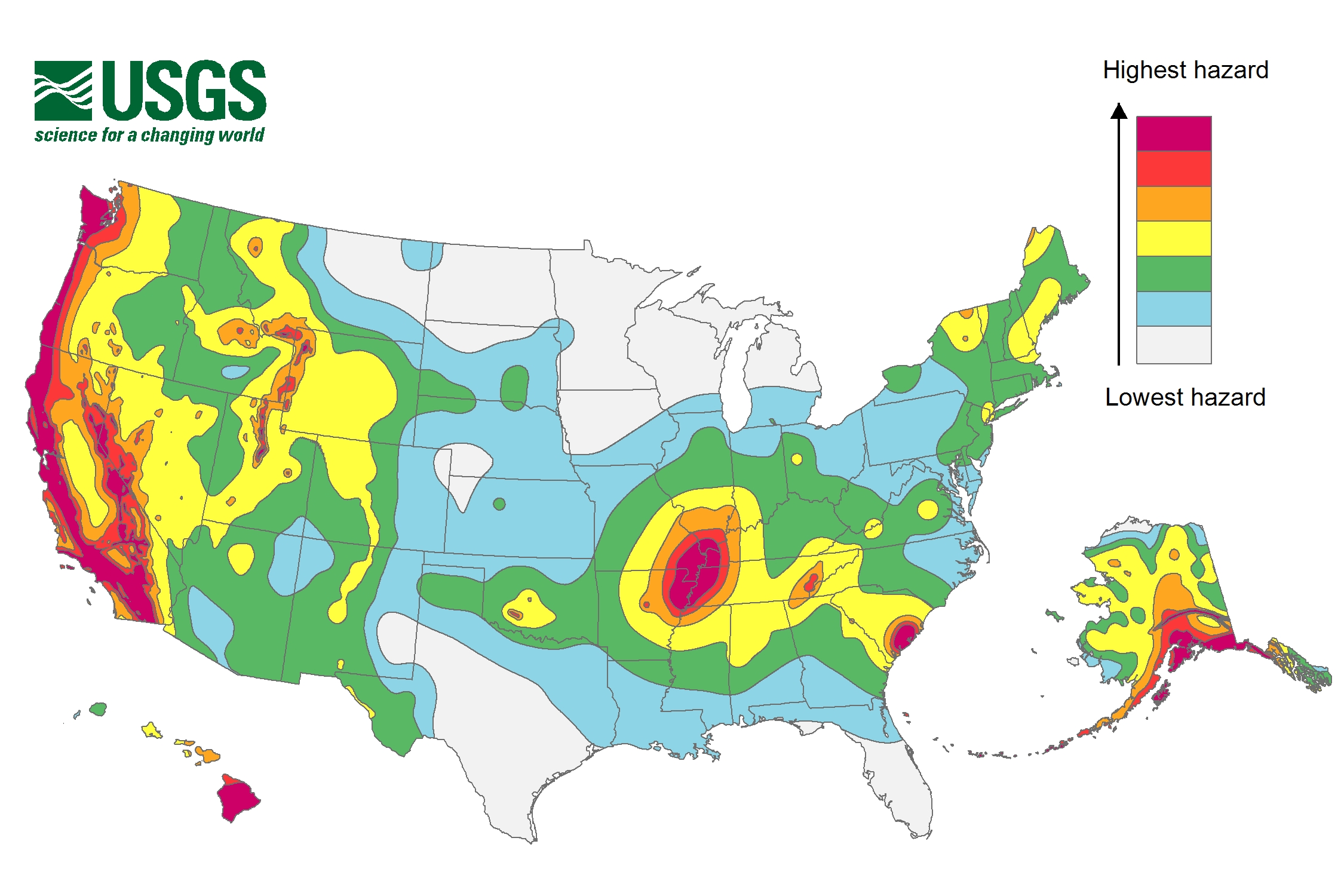
West Texas has the highest seismic hazard of any region in Texas.

The largest earthquakes in Texas history have occurred in West Texas, which is the state's most seismically active region. Earthquakes have been reported in El Paso – near the state's westernmost extent – since as early as 1887. There are several faults in the region, including the Mayfield Fault, Rim Rock Fault, and Valentine Fault, in addition to other major geologic features such as the Central Basin Platform, the Ouachita Tectonic Front, and the Rio Grande rift. The 1931 Valentine earthquake may have been generated by movement along either the Mayfield or Rim Rock Faults, though no investigation of fault displacement was performed in the area after the earthquake. One 1987 study published in the Bulletin of the Seismological Society of America suggested that the earthquake was caused by either normal or strike-slip faulting at a depth of 6 mi (10 km), with a dip of 54° to the east, a strike of 10–20° and a rake of –150°. The tremor may have resulted in broad subsidence of 4 in (11 mm) over a 10–20 mi (20–30 km) long stretch near Valentine. Though no surface rupture was reported in connection with the earthquake along a fault, cracks in the alluvium within the nearby Quitman Canyon developed during the earthquake, retaining depths of 7 ft (2.1 m) and widths as wide as 3 ft (0.91 m) at least 17 years after the earthquake.

=== Earthquake ===
The main Valentine earthquake occurred at 5:40 a.m. Central Standard Time (11:40 UTC) on August 16, 1931, with an epicenter near 30.502°N 104.575°W, roughly 7 mi (12 km) southwest of Valentine, Texas, and towards the southeastern end of the Rio Grande rift. The earthquake was felt across most of Texas and in portions of Kansas, New Mexico, Oklahoma, and northern Mexico, producing perceptible shaking as far as 400 mi (640 km) away from the epicenter. Its hypocenter was beneath the Lobo Valley, a northwest-trending alluvial plain. Estimates for its magnitude range between m_{b} 5.6–6.4, making it the strongest earthquake in Texas on record. The United States Geological Survey (USGS) lists the earthquake as having a magnitude of mb_{Lg} 5.8 based on the amplitude of short-period surface Lg waves. The ISC–GEM catalogue lists the earthquake as having a magnitude of M_{w} 6.3. Seismographs as far as St. Louis, Missouri, recorded both foreshocks and aftershocks beginning on August 16 and continuing well after the main earthquake. The foreshocks drove many people to sleep outdoors, possibly mitigating human casualties caused by the main shock. Numerous aftershocks occurred after the main tremor, particularly in the ensuing eight hours. The strongest aftershock occurred at 1:37 p.m. CST (19:37 UTC) on August 18, cracking walls in Valentine and stopping clocks in El Paso. The aftershock had a magnitude of approximately 4.2 and produced a maximum intensity of V (Moderate). A magnitude 3.0 or 3.2 aftershock occurred near Valentine at 9:50 a.m. CST (15:50 UTC) on November 3 and was detected by a seismometer in Tucson, Arizona.

== Damage ==
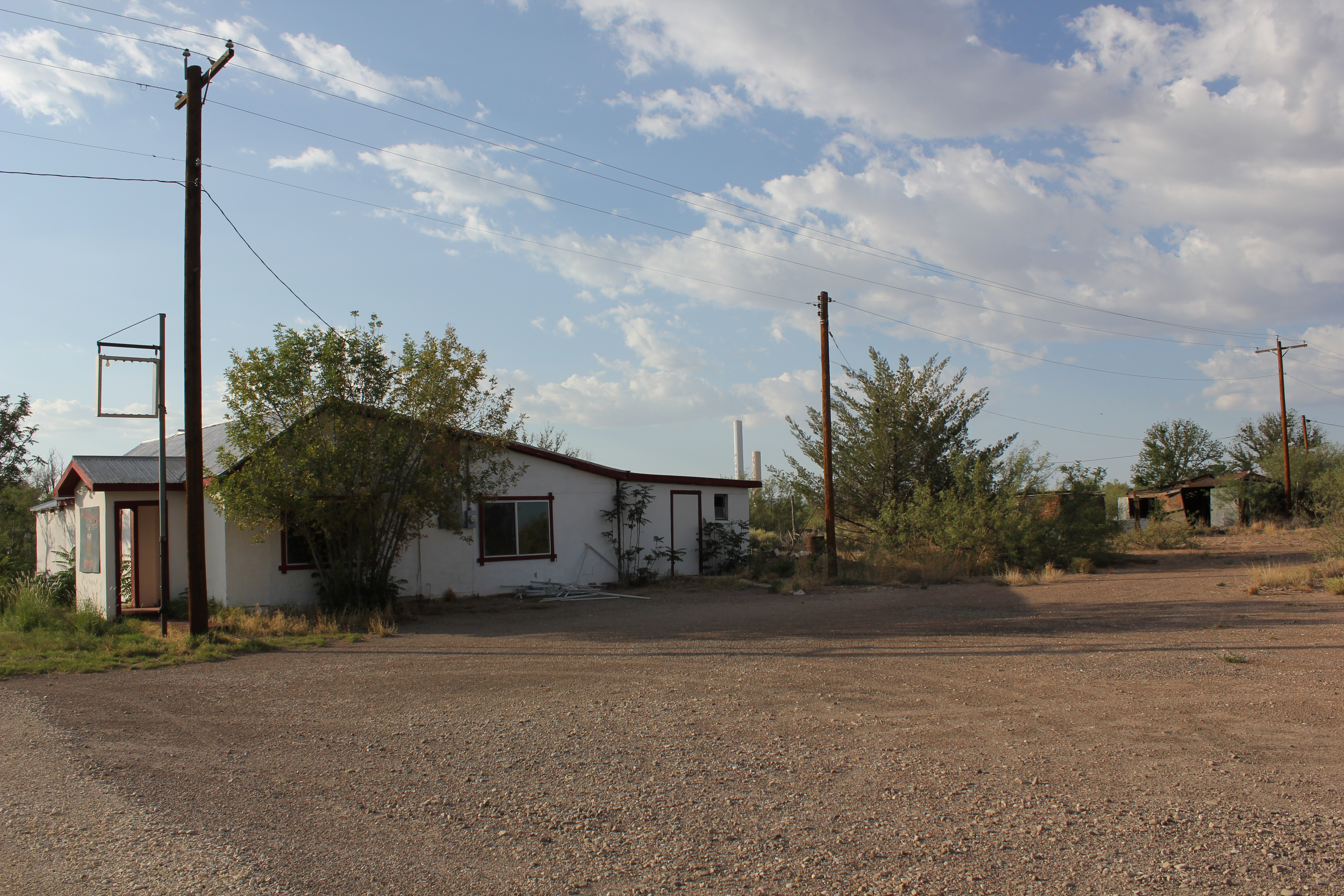
Valentine, Texas, in 2014

Shaking from the earthquake was most intense in the Valentine, Texas, area. At Valentine, the shaking intensity reached level VIII (Damaging tremor) on the Rossi–Forel scale and level VIII (Severe) on the Modified Mercalli scale. Every building in the town excluding those made from wood frames sustained damage. Many chimneys toppled or cracked following the quake. The local school facility was damaged beyond repair, and its yard sustained minor cracks. Buildings built with adobe had walls collapse, while wooden structures displayed cracked ceilings. Other walls consisting of concrete, brick, and similar materials had large cracks. Damage also occurred in the counties of Brewster, Culberson, Jeff Davis, and Presidio. While there were no fatalities, some minor injuries resulted from falling adobe. The cost of damage in Valentine amounted to $50,000–$75,000.

Shaking from the earthquake was noticed in the Texas Panhandle, rocking buildings and awakening many people. The Mercalli intensity in Houston was estimated to be as high as III (Weak). The intensity was mild in Ciudad Jiménez, 250 mi (410 km) to the south in Mexico. Although the Houston Post-Dispatch attributed the collapse of homes in Oaxaca City to the Valentine earthquake despite being over 1,080 mi (1,750 km) away from the epicenter, the considerable distance suggested that such effects were caused by a more local earthquake. Several landslides resulted from the tremor. Such incidents took place in the Van Horn Mountains, the Chisos Mountains, southwest of Lobo, near the Big Bend, and to the northwest near Pilares and Porvenir. In New Mexico, the Guadalupe Mountains also hosted landslides; in Picacho, rock- and mudslides were reported. Hydrologic issues occurred in several artificial water bodies, leading to muddied water.

== See also ==
- List of earthquakes in 1931
- List of earthquakes in the United States
- 1995 Marathon earthquake
