= Alpine Avalanche =

- Type: Weekly newspaper
- Publisher: J.T. Maroney
- Editor: Kara Gerbert
- Founded: 1891
- Language: English
- Headquarters: 118 N. Fifth, Alpine, Texas United States
- Circulation: 2,047 (as of 2023)
- Website: Official website

The Alpine Avalanche is a weekly newspaper based in Alpine, Texas, United States, and covering Brewster County. In 1982, its circulation was 4,850, with vendor/counter/dealer sales being 2,196.
