= 1995 Marathon earthquake =

Earthquake in Texas, United States

- UTC time: 1995-04-14 00:32:56
- ISC event: 109176
- USGS-ANSS: ComCat
- Local date: 13 April 1995
- Local time: 19:32 CDT
- Magnitude: 5.7 M_{w}
- Depth: 17.8 km (11 mi)
- Epicenter: 30.285°N 103.347°E
- Areas affected: Texas, United States
- Max. intensity: MMI VII (Very strong)
- Casualties: 2 injured

Striking on April 13, 1995, the 1995 Marathon earthquake was recorded at moment magnitude of 5.7. It rattled buildings near the epicenter.

== Geography ==
The earthquake struck western Texas with magnitude 5.7 force. It was the 3rd largest earthquake in the United States in 1995. The epicenter was probably in Alpine.

== Damage and casualties ==
Not a particularly damaging earthquake, the event caused two direct injuries. Both were slight.

== See also ==
- List of earthquakes in 1995
- List of earthquakes in the United States
- List of earthquakes in Texas
