= Alpine, Texas =

- City
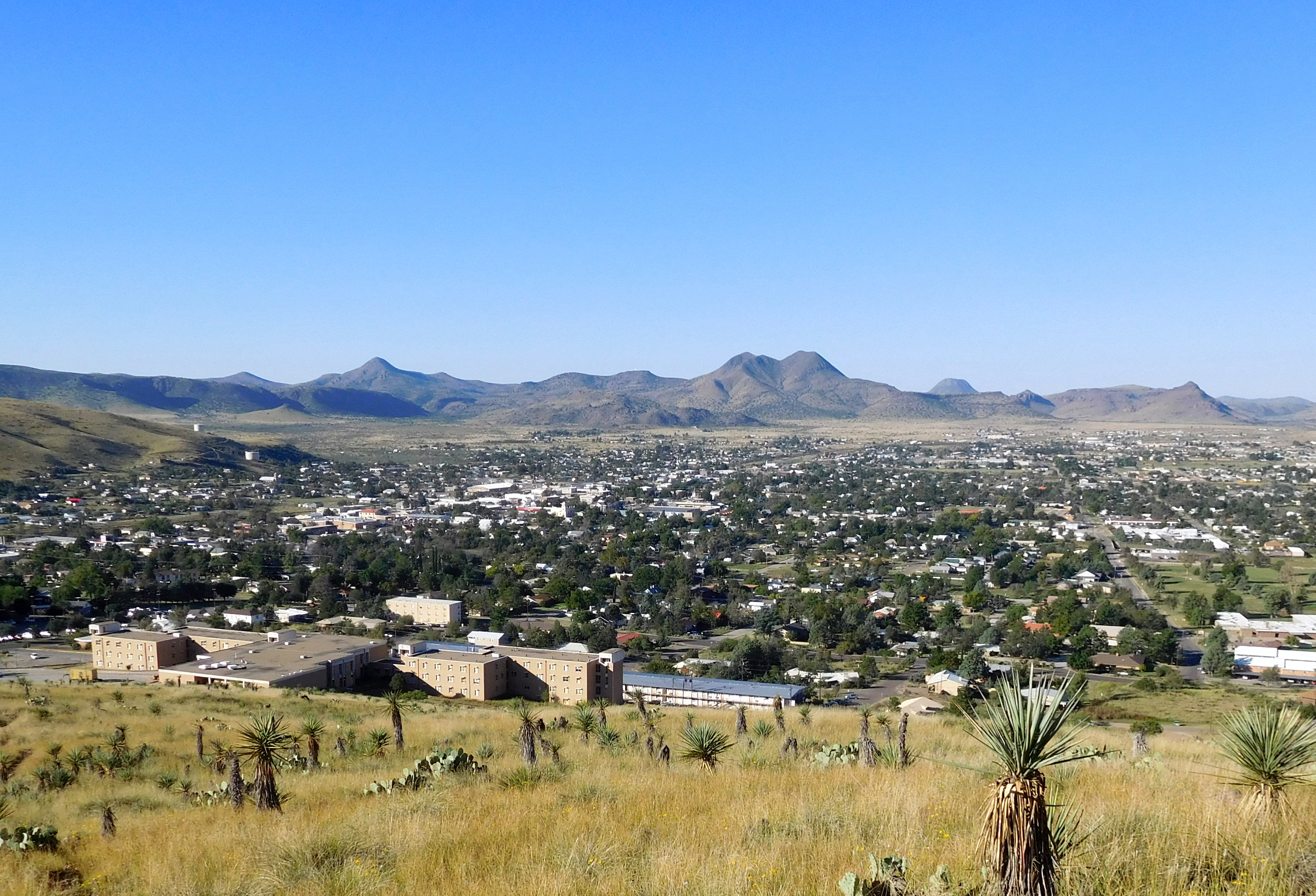
- Alpine from atop Hancock Hill to the southwest.
- Nickname: The Heart of Big Bend
- Interactive map of Alpine, Texas
- Location within Texas Location within the United States
- Coordinates: 30°22′20″N 103°40′00″W
- Country: United States
- State: Texas
- County: Brewster

Government
  - Mayor: Catherine Eaves

Area
  - Total: 4.80 sq mi (12.44 km^{2})
  - Land: 4.80 sq mi (12.43 km^{2})
  - Water: 0 sq mi (0.00 km^{2})
- Elevation: 4,462 ft (1,360 m)

Population (2020)
  - Total: 6,035
  - Density: 1,246.0/sq mi (481.09/km^{2})
- Time zone: UTC-06:00 (CST)
  - Summer (DST): UTC-05:00 (CDT)
- ZIP codes: 79830-79832
- Area code: 432
- FIPS code: 48-02104
- GNIS feature ID: 2409685
- Website: cityofalpine.com

Alpine (/ˈælpaɪn/ AL-pyne) is a city in and the county seat of Brewster County, Texas, United States. Its population was 6,035 at the 2020 census. The town has an elevation of 4,462 feet (1,360 m), and the surrounding mountain peaks are over 1 mile (1.6 km) above sea level. Sul Ross State University, a hospital, library, and retail make Alpine the center of the sprawling 12,000 square miles (3,108,000 ha) wide-open Big Bend area (combined population 12,500) including Brewster, Presidio, and Jeff Davis Counties.

== History ==
The area had been a campsite for cattlemen tending their herds between 1878 and the spring of 1882, when a town of tents was created by railroad workers and their families. Because the section of the railroad was called Osborne, that was the name of the small community for a brief time. The railroad needed access to water from springs owned by brothers named Daniel and Thomas Murphy, so it entered into an agreement with the Murphys to change the name of the section and settlement to Murphyville in exchange for a contract to use the spring. In November 1883, the Murphys registered a plat for the town of Murphyville with the county clerk of Presidio County.

The town's name was changed to Alpine on February 3, 1888, following a petition by its residents. At this time, a description of the town mentioned a dozen houses, three saloons, a hotel and rooming house, a livery stable, a butcher shop, and a drugstore, which also housed the post office.

Alpine grew very slowly until Sul Ross State Normal College (now Sul Ross State University) was opened in 1920. The development of Big Bend National Park in the 1930s and '40s spurred further growth. The population was estimated at only 396 in 1904, but by 1927, it had risen to 3,000. The 1950 census reported Alpine's population at 5,256, and a high of roughly 6,200 was reached by 1976. In 1990, the population was down to 5,637. In 2000, the population grew modestly to 5,786 and 5,905 by 2010.

In 1995, the epicenter of the Marathon earthquake was likely near the city.

The Holland Hotel, built during a brief mercury-mining boom, was designed by Henry Trost, a distinguished regional architect. Today, it helps to anchor a traditional downtown of early 20th-century buildings still occupied by family-owned retailers and restaurants.

== Geography ==
The town sits on a high plateau, in the Chihuahuan Desert, with the Davis Mountains to the north and the Chisos Mountains to the south. Outcrops of ancient volcanic rocks spread to the northwest. Other layers of rocks have been exposed over time as the mountains were forced up and then eroded. The high elevation cools the desert air in the evenings. The small rocky outcrop just northeast of the historic downtown strip is informally referred to by long-time locals as Bollinger Ridge, named after a family of early 20th-century ranchers.

According to the United States Census Bureau, the city has a total area of 4.7 square miles (12.1 km^{2}), all land.

=== Climate ===
According to the Köppen climate classification system, Alpine has a semiarid climate, BSk on climate maps.

Climate data for Alpine, Texas (Mar 1, 1900–Mar 31, 2013)
Month	Jan	Feb	Mar	Apr	May	Jun	Jul	Aug	Sep	Oct	Nov	Dec	Year
Record high °F (°C)	81 (27)	89 (32)	91 (33)	99 (37)	102 (39)	107 (42)	106 (41)	103 (39)	101 (38)	97 (36)	87 (31)	83 (28)	107 (42)
Mean daily maximum °F (°C)	60.5 (15.8)	64.5 (18.1)	70.9 (21.6)	78.7 (25.9)	85.4 (29.7)	90.8 (32.7)	89.4 (31.9)	88.5 (31.4)	83.8 (28.8)	77.8 (25.4)	67.8 (19.9)	61.5 (16.4)	76.6 (24.8)
Daily mean °F (°C)	46.4 (8.0)	49.8 (9.9)	55.5 (13.1)	63.2 (17.3)	70.5 (21.4)	76.8 (24.9)	76.7 (24.8)	75.8 (24.3)	70.9 (21.6)	63.6 (17.6)	53.5 (11.9)	47.7 (8.7)	62.5 (16.9)
Mean daily minimum °F (°C)	32.7 (0.4)	35.2 (1.8)	40.1 (4.5)	47.5 (8.6)	55.5 (13.1)	62.7 (17.1)	64.0 (17.8)	63.1 (17.3)	58.0 (14.4)	49.5 (9.7)	39.3 (4.1)	33.9 (1.1)	48.5 (9.2)
Record low °F (°C)	0 (−18)	−2 (−19)	10 (−12)	20 (−7)	29 (−2)	32 (0)	52 (11)	49 (9)	36 (2)	21 (−6)	−2 (−19)	−3 (−19)	−3 (−19)
Average precipitation inches (mm)	0.53 (13)	0.48 (12)	0.36 (9.1)	0.50 (13)	1.24 (31)	2.30 (58)	2.75 (70)	2.65 (67)	2.57 (65)	1.30 (33)	0.51 (13)	0.60 (15)	15.80 (401)
Average snowfall inches (cm)	1.3 (3.3)	0.5 (1.3)	0.3 (0.76)	0 (0)	0 (0)	0 (0)	0 (0)	0 (0)	0 (0)	0.1 (0.25)	0.4 (1.0)	0.7 (1.8)	3.1 (7.9)
Average precipitation days (≥ 0.001 in)	3.41	2.92	2.44	2.52	5.20	7.48	8.46	8.38	7.86	4.74	2.99	3.14	60.29
Source: Western Regional Climate Center, Desert Research Institute

== Demographics ==
Historical population
Census	Pop.	Note	%±
1920	931		—
1930	3,495		275.4%
1940	3,866		10.6%
1950	5,261		36.1%
1960	4,740		−9.9%
1970	5,971		26.0%
1980	5,465		−8.5%
1990	5,622		2.9%
2000	5,786		2.9%
2010	5,905		2.1%
2020	6,035		2.2%
1850-2000, 2010

=== 2020 census ===
As of the 2020 census, 6,035 people, 2,586 households, and 1,414 families resided in the city.

The median age was 37.4 years. About 18.5% of residents were under 18 and 19.2% of residents were 65 or older. For every 100 females, there were 102.1 males, and for every 100 females 18 and over, there were 100.0 males 18 and over.

About 97.7% of residents lived in urban areas, while 2.3% lived in rural areas.

Of the 2,586 households in Alpine, 24.0% had children under 18 living in them, 35.7% were married-couple households, 25.7% were households with a male householder and no spouse or partner present, and 32.1% were households with a female householder and no spouse or partner present. About 40.4% of all households were made up of individuals, and 15.7% had someone living alone who was 65 or older.

About 18.8% of the 3,185 housing units were vacant. Among occupied housing units, 56.5% were owner-occupied and 43.5% were renter-occupied. The homeowner vacancy rate was 2.6%, and the rental vacancy rate was 14.3%.

Racial composition as of the 2020 census
Race	Percent
White	62.9%
Black or African American	2.9%
American Indian and Alaska Native	1.7%
Asian	1.3%
Native Hawaiian and Other Pacific Islander	0.1%
Some other race	9.2%
Two or more races	21.7%
Hispanic or Latino (of any race)	48.7%

=== 2000 census ===
As of the 2000 census, 5,786 people, 2,429 households, and 1,435 families resided in the city. The population density was 1,416.5 inhabitants per square mile (546.9/km^{2}). The 2,852 housing units averaged 698.2 per square mile (269.9/km^{2}). The racial makeup of the city was 79.19% White, 1.33% African American, 0.81% Native American, 0.45% Asian, 0.07% Pacific Islander, 15.45% from other races, and 2.70% from two or more races. Hispanics or Latinos of any race were 50.31% of the population.

Of the 2,429 households, 28.7% had children under 18 living with them, 43.7% were married couples living together, 11.8% had a female householder with no husband present, and 40.9% were not families. About 34.3% of all households were made up of individuals, and 13.1% had someone living alone who was 65 or older. The average household size was 2.34 and the average family size was 3.04.

In the city, the population was distributed as 24.3% under the age of 18, 14.1% from 18 to 24, 26.0% from 25 to 44, 20.8% from 45 to 64, and 14.9% who were 65 years of age or older. The median age was 34 years. For every 100 females, there were 93.7 males. For every 100 females 18 and over, there were 90.4 males.

The median income for a household in the city was $23,979 and for a family was $31,658. Males had a median income of $27,720 versus $19,575 for females. The per capita income for the city was $13,587. About 15.5% of families and 20.9% of the population were below the poverty line, including 22.3% of those under 18 and 17.1% of those 65 or over.

== Arts and culture ==
Museum of the Big Bend

=== Museum ===
The Museum of the Big Bend on the Sul Ross campus uses exhibits of Native American artifacts, cultural history, geology, paleontology, and Western art to introduce the visitor to the Big Bend region. Subjects include the area's Indian tribes, the Buffalo soldiers, the mining era, the stagecoach, the railroad, and the history of Big Bend National Park. The overview includes historic photographs and short videos. The building was constructed in 1937 with local stone. Funding came from the Texas Centennial Commission and the Works Progress Administration, a federal make-work program during the Depression.

=== National Register of Historic Places ===
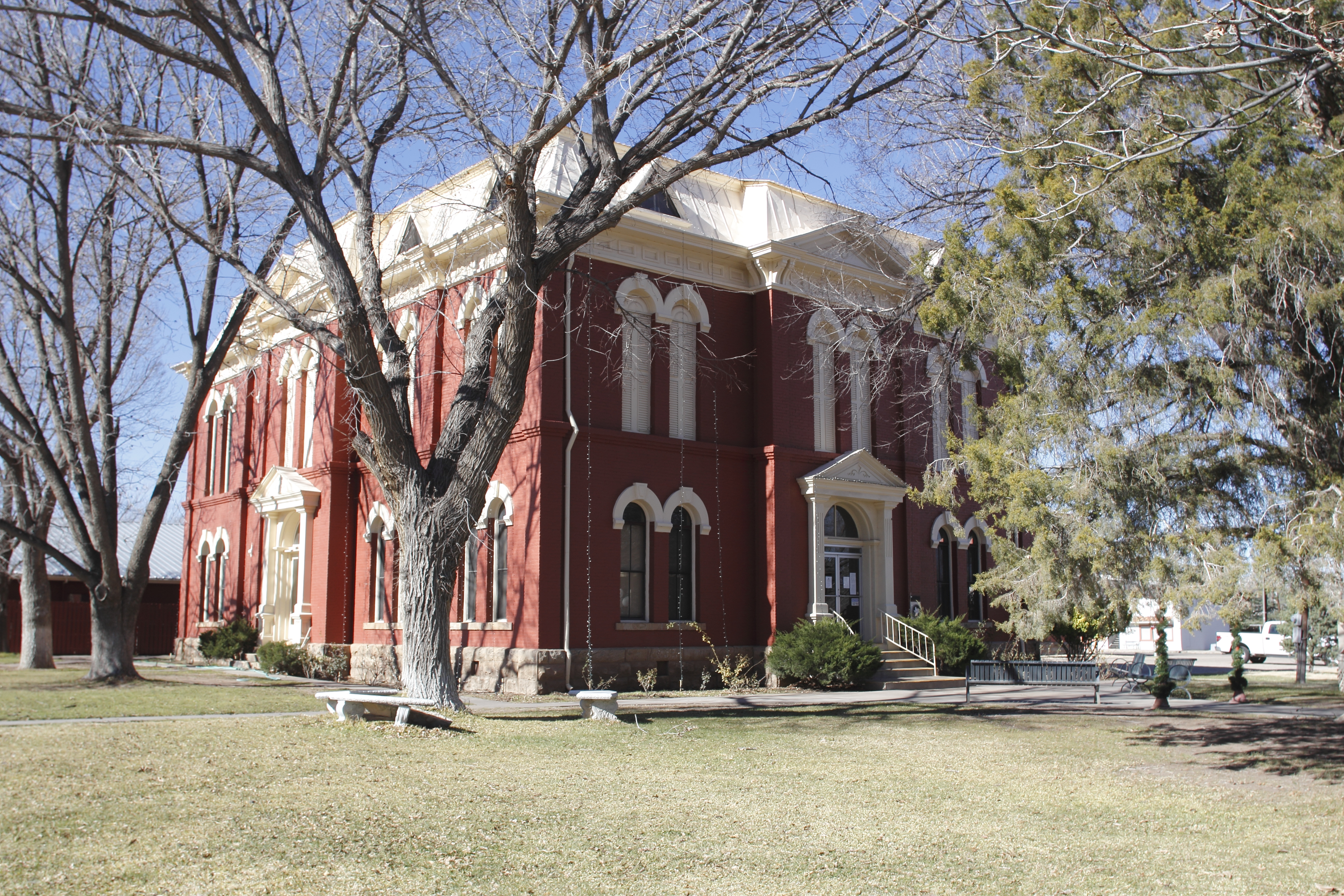
Brewster County Courthouse, built in 1888 by local contractor Tom Lovell

Brewster County Courthouse, built in 1887, is listed on the National Register of Historic Places. The adjoining Brewster County Jail features a crenelated brick parapet wall, suggesting "a fortress-like impregnability".

=== Annual events ===
- Texas Cowboy Poetry Gathering, usually late February, is a celebration of the oral tradition of working cowboys in poetry, song, and music.
- Trappings of Texas, in April, is an exhibit and sale of custom gear and Western art held at the Museum of the Big Bend.
- Big Bend Gem and Mineral Show, in April, is held at the Civic Center.
- 'Cinco de Mayo includes a parade, enchilada dinner, music and dancing, car show, and Grand Mercado at Kokernot Field.
- Alpine Cowboys professional baseball games take place at historic Kokernot Field.
- Theater of the Big Bend, for over 50 years, this local theater troupe has performed various plays and musicals at the Kokernot Lodge outdoor amphitheater.
- Fourth of July/Fiestas Barrios, July 4, parade, food, music, fireworks
- Viva Big Bend, music festival, in July, more than 50 bands play at venues from Marathon to Marfa, Fort Davis to Alpine.
- Drive Big Bend has driving tours, music, parties, and a car show at Kokernot Field for antique, classic, and performance automobiles.
- Big Bend Ranch Rodeo, in August, displays the skills of working cowboys (rather than rodeo professionals).
- National Intercollegiate Rodeo
- Big Bend Octane Fest, hosted by The Stable Performance Cars in early October. This weekend-long festival includes a car show, driving tours around the Big Bend, Marfa, Alpine, Fort Davis, and Marathon areas, auctions, and more, for antique, classic, and performance automobiles.
- No Country For Old Men, in October, this bike race lists itself as "America's Premiere 1000 Mile Road Race".
- ARTWALK, The weekend before Thanksgiving, art spills from the galleries onto the streets and Arbolitos Park, with chalk art on the sidewalks, live music, and a parade of flags.
- Parade of Lights, December

=== Public art ===
Downtown Alpine. Photo by Carol M. Highsmith.

A mural in the former post office at 109 West E St was painted as part of the New Deal public works programs during the Great Depression. Surviving murals from the project are found in 60 or so Texas cities and towns. Completed in 1940, this mural is by a Spanish-born and trained artist, Jose Moya del Pino, who was living and working in San Francisco. In the foreground, three figures recline on a rocky overlook. They are each reading: a book, a magazine, and a tabloid newspaper, celebrating how the post office brings information and education to small towns and cattle ranches. On the horizon, the Twin Sisters Mountain marks the location, with the town in the middle distance, including, at the behest of townspeople, the characteristic red-brick buildings of the Sul Ross State campus.

=== Library ===
Begun by volunteers in 1947, the Alpine Public Library remains an independent entity with its own board of directors, and supported by the taxpayers of Brewster County and the City of Alpine. The Alpine Public Library opened a new facility in 2012.

== Sports ==
Alpine is home to the Alpine Cowboys independent baseball team. A member of the Pecos League, the Cowboys play their home games at Kokernot Field.

== Education ==
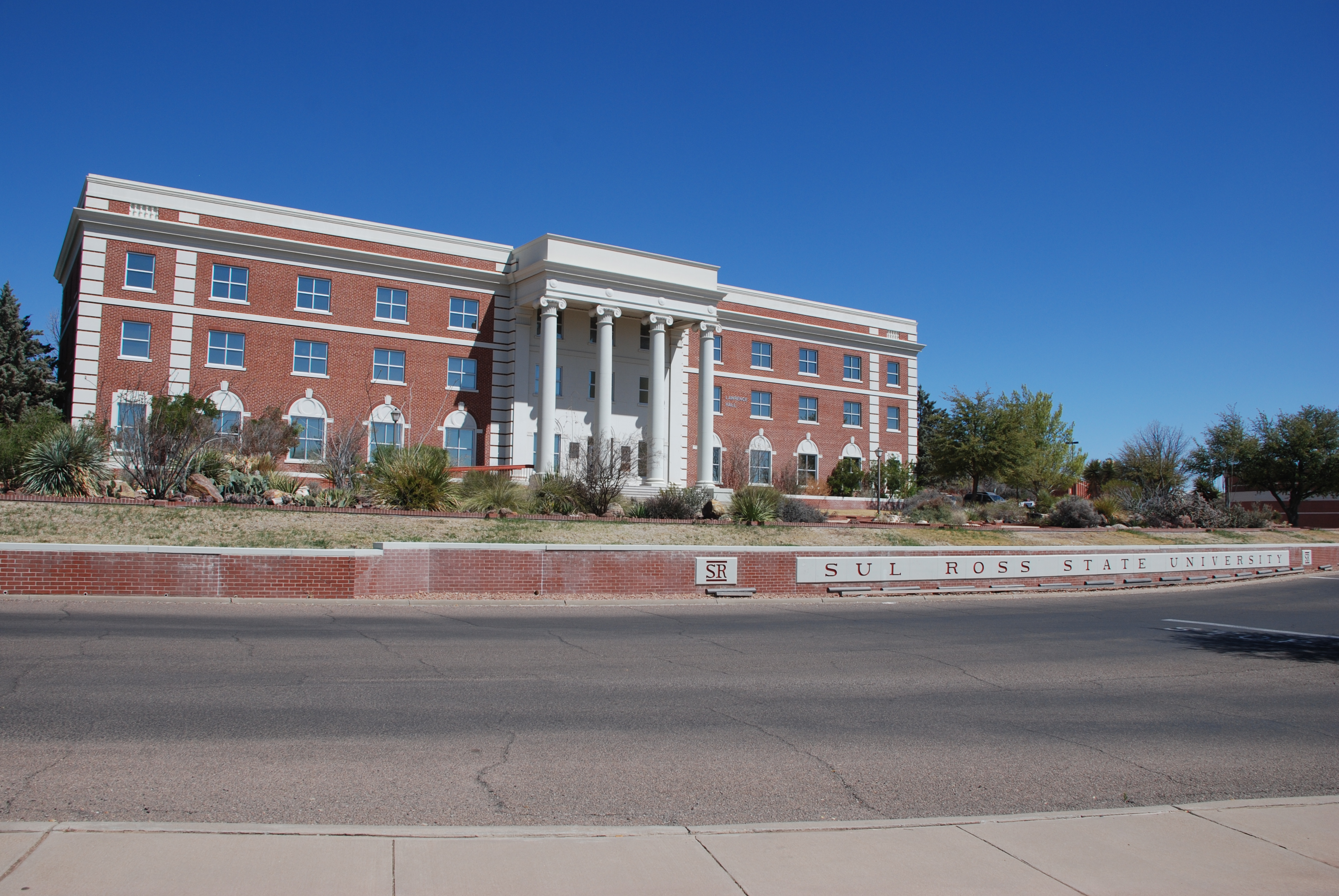
Lawrence Hall at Sul Ross State University

=== University ===
Sul Ross State University began as a teachers' college in 1920, with its original campus in Alpine. Named for Lawrence Sullivan Ross, a Confederate States Army general during the American Civil War, Texas' 19th governor and later president of the new land grant college which became Texas A&M, it is now a member of the Texas State University System. About 2,000 students attend the university. Sul Ross was the founding location of the National Intercollegiate Rodeo Association in 1949. The Sul Ross Rodeo Club competes in 10 NIRA rodeos each year. The NIRA rodeo hosted in Alpine is a big event for the school and the community.

Brewster County is within the Odessa College District for community college.

=== Schools ===
Alpine Independent School District serves more than 1,000 local students attending Alpine Elementary School, Alpine Middle School, and Alpine High School, in classes from prekindergarten, kindergarten, and first through 12th grades.

Alpine Montessori School is a private, nonsectarian, nonprofit school which serves prekindergarten through sixth grade.

Alpine Christian School is a nondenominational Christian school serving prekindergarten through grade 12.

== Media ==
In 1985, KVLF-AM, the only radio station licensed in Brewster County, was in Alpine. An individual quoted in a Federal Communications Commission report stated that in daylight hours, getting radio from Fort Stockton was possible.

The local daily paper is The Alpine Avalanche, which has local news stories and advertisements, but has almost no coverage of news outside of the area. Additionally, Sul Ross students publish the Skyline and a resort sale publication called The Lajitas Sun is published. An FCC report in 1985 stated that while readers in the county read the San Angelo Standard Times and the Odessa American, "The two papers seldom carry articles covering the Alpine area."

=== Filming location ===
- Boyhood, the 2014 movie featured places in and around Alpine.

== Infrastructure ==
=== Transportation ===
==== Highways ====
- U.S. Route 90
- U.S. Route 67
- Texas State Highway 118
- Texas State Highway 223

==== Rail ====
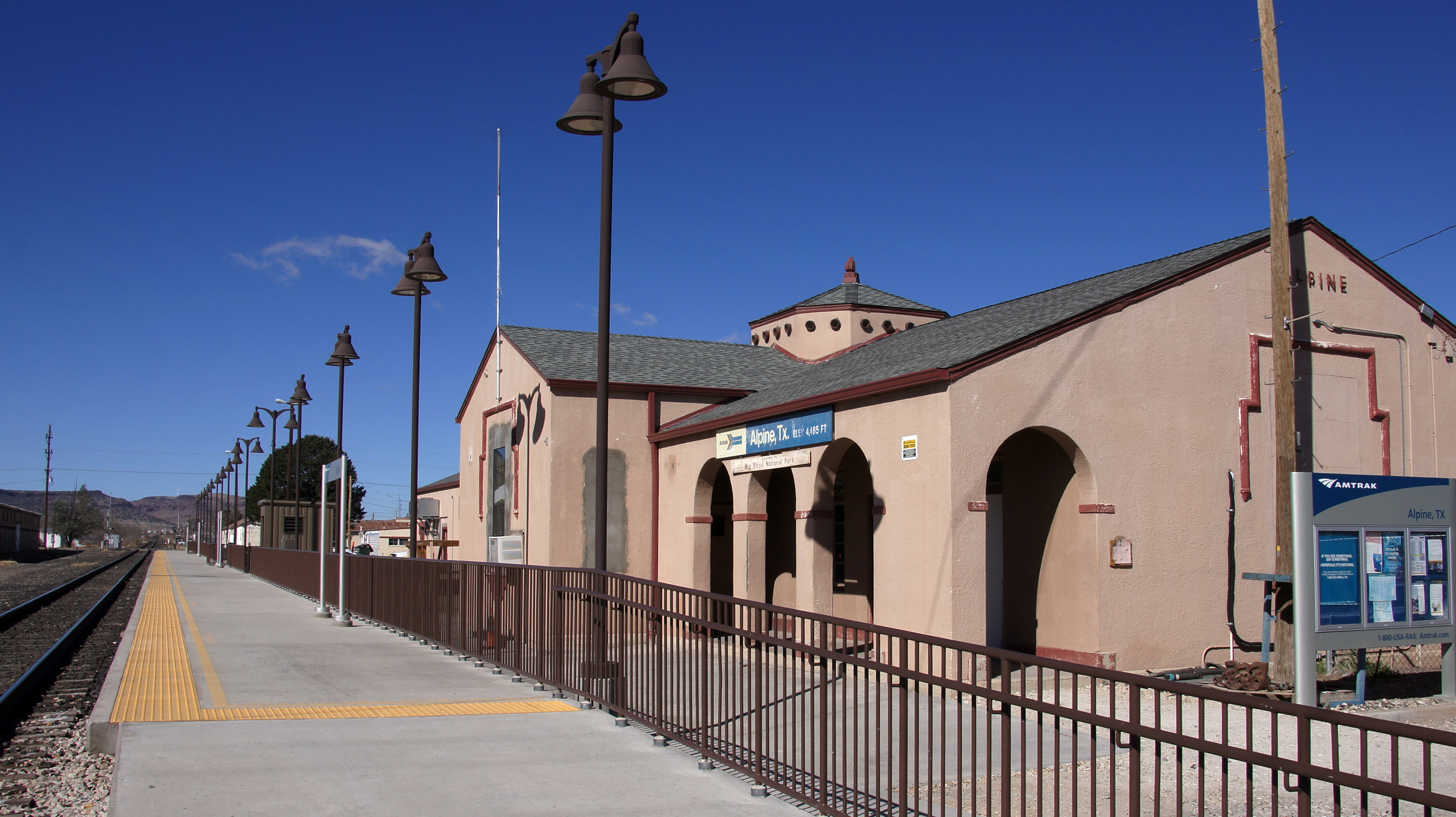
Alpine station

Amtrak's Sunset Limited long-distance train stops three times a week at the Alpine station on the former Southern Pacific Railroad's Sunset Line, the nation's second transcontinental route, now part of Union Pacific. Alpine is a crew change location for Union Pacific freight trains, making for constant activity along the tracks. In the past, Alpine was also served by the Kansas City, Mexico and Orient Railway.

==== Intercity bus ====
All Aboard America!'s "Presidio Route" stops at Midland International Air and Space Port.

==== Airports ====
Alpine-Casparis Municipal Airport is a city-owned, public-use airport northwest of Alpine serving general aviation.

=== Hospital ===
Big Bend Regional Medical Center is a 25-bed facility. Inpatient and outpatient services are provided.

== Notable people ==
- Carl W. Bauer, former Louisiana state senator
- John Coleman, founder of the Weather Channel
- Pete Gallego, former Texas state senator and U.S. representative
- Joaquin Jackson, former Texas Ranger and actor
- Fritz Kiersch, film director (Children of the Corn, Tuff Turf)
- Amanda Marcotte, feminist blogger for Slate and The Guardian
- Eric O'Keefe, author, journalist, and editor
- Bake Turner, former National Football League (NFL) wide receiver
- Case Keenum, NFL quarterback
