= McCoy's Building Supply =

American building supply retail chain

- Company type: Private
- Industry: lumber, building materials and farm & ranch equipment.
- Founded: 1927
- Founder: F.R. McCoy
- Headquarters: San Marcos, Texas, United States
- Number of locations: 85+
- Area served: Texas, Oklahoma & New Mexico
- Key people: Brian McCoy - Board Chairman Meagan McCoy Jones -President & Chief Executive Officer Reid B. McCoy - Vice Chairman / Board of Directors Wetonnah McCoy - Board Member
- Revenue: $1 billion USD (2020)
- Owner: McCoy family
- Website: www.mccoys.com

McCoy’s Building Supply Company (McCoy's) is a regional, family-owned building materials retailer that has been in operation for over 95 years. It sells lumber, panels, home improvement supplies and farm & ranch equipment as well as cleaning and lawn care materials. Headquartered in San Marcos, Texas, McCoy’s has grown to become one of the largest privately held independent building supply companies in the United States. The company operates primarily in Texas, but it also has a presence in neighboring states like New Mexico and Oklahoma.

== History ==
McCoy’s Building Supply was founded in 1927 in Galveston, Texas, by F.R. McCoy, as a small, local roofing business. The company’s early focus was on providing construction materials like lumber and hardware to local builders, contractors, ranchers and DIY'ers.

Over the decades, McCoy’s expanded its product offerings to include a range of building supplies, including plumbing, electrical, paint, flooring, and home improvement products. The company is still privately held by the McCoy family, with leadership passing down through several generations.

In 2024, USA Today listed McCoy's as one of America's top retailers, as reviewed by consumers.

== Retail Operations ==
McCoy’s Building Supply operates 85 retail locations across Texas, Oklahoma, and New Mexico.

In the 2020s, McCoy's started to introduce robotics into its retail locations. These robots were introduced to provide ongoing tracking of inventory and retail prices.
