= List of current NCAA Division II football coaches =

The National Collegiate Athletic Association (NCAA) Division II includes 160 teams. Each team has one head coach. As of the upcoming 2026 season, Division II is composed of sixteen conferences: the Conference Carolinas, Central Intercollegiate Athletic Association (CIAA), Great American Conference (GAC), Great Lakes Intercollegiate Athletic Conference (GLIAC), Great Lakes Valley Conference (GLVC), Great Midwest Athletic Conference (G-MAC), Gulf South Conference (GSC), Lone Star Conference (LSC), Mountain East Conference (MEC), Mid-America Intercollegiate Athletics Association (MIAA), Northeast-10 Conference (NE-10), Northern Sun Intercollegiate Conference (NSIC), Pennsylvania State Athletic Conference (PSAC), Rocky Mountain Athletic Conference (RMAC), South Atlantic Conference (SAC), and the Southern Intercollegiate Athletic Conference (SIAC), as well as one school that competes as an independent.

As of the start of the 2026 season, the longest-tenured coach in Division II is expected to be Todd Knight of Ouachita Baptist, who has been head coach at the school since 1999. In all, 27 Division II programs will have new head coaches in 2026.

Conference affiliations are current for the 2026 season. Two future Division II teams have hired their head coaches; those teams are indicated with a light blue background. Records are current as of 8/8/2026.

== Coaches ==
Team	Conference	Head coach	First season	W	L	W%	W	L	W%	Offensive coordinator(s)	Defensive coordinator(s)	Special teams coordinator(s)
				Current			College Career					
Barton Bulldogs	Carolinas	Chip Hester	2020	22	37	.373	92	86	.517	Jazz Vinson	Kim Brown / Quayon Gilbert	Vacant
Chowan Hawks	Carolinas	Paul Johnson	2023	7	24	.226	7	24	.226	Vacant	Cody Gray	Maverick Wolfley
Erskine Flying Fleet	Carolinas	Shap Boyd	2020	8	51	.121	8	51	.121	Terry Anton	Vacant	Chris Williams
Ferrum Panthers	Carolinas	Kevin Sherman	2024	9	12	.429	9	12	.429	Cameron Clark	Anthony Konieczka	Lawrence Robinson
North Greenville Crusaders	Carolinas	Nate Garner	2025	7	5	.583	7	5	.583	Dustin Noller	JR Clark	Vacant
Shorter Hawks	Carolinas	Zach Morrison	2018	17	63	.213	17	63	.213	John Dietl	Harlen Jacobs	Vacant
UNC Pembroke Braves	Carolinas	Mark Hall	2023	21	11	.656	37	20	.649	Vacant	Colin Neely	Brian Frierson
Bluefield State Big Blues	CIAA	Davon Morgan	2024	4	16	.200	4	16	.200	Keith Willis-Auger	Nicholas Pearce	Jaden Allen
Bowie State Bulldogs	CIAA	Dawson Odums	2026	0	0	–	79	72	.523	Jason Phillips	Vacant	Blake Yorloff
Elizabeth City State Vikings	CIAA	Adrian Jones	2025	4	6	.400	39	51	.433	Toryeon Hester	Andre George	Vacant
Fayetteville State Broncos	CIAA	Richard Hayes Jr.	2016	59	33	.641	59	33	.641	Tim Reynolds Jr.	Kienus Boulware	Tyrone Jones
Johnson C. Smith Golden Bulls	CIAA	Maurice Flowers	2022	27	15	.643	34	20	.630	Vacant	Barry Tripp	James Lott
Lincoln Lions	CIAA	Frank Turner	2023	6	24	.200	6	24	.200	Joel Hirsch	Vacant	Malik Jones
Livingstone Blue Bears	CIAA	Sean Gilbert	2020	20	29	.408	20	29	.408	Matthew Finnin / Glenn Reese	Michael Austin / Mark Williams	Damani Neal
Shaw Bears	CIAA	Lamar Manigo	2025	2	8	.200	2	8	.200	Vacant	Vacant	Vacant
Virginia State Trojans	CIAA	Henry Frazier III	2022	27	14	.659	104	82	.559	Rahmann Lee	Carlos Fields	John Pearce
Virginia Union Panthers	CIAA	Alvin Parker	2018	59	20	.747	59	20	.747	Quinn Brown	Edward Pointer	Diego Ryland
Winston-Salem State Rams	CIAA	Tory Woodbury	2026	0	0	–	0	0	–	Calvin Randall	Errick Hargrove	Vacant
Arkansas–Monticello Boll Weevils	GAC	Gary Goff	2026	0	0	–	70	76	.479	Vacant	William Henry	JJ Mayer
Arkansas Tech Wonder Boys	GAC	Roy Thompson Jr.	2025	7	4	.636	7	4	.636	Kevin Wewers	Frank Espy	Vacant
East Central Tigers	GAC	John Litrenta	2023	14	19	.424	14	19	.424	Christopher Bolden	Vacant	Tabow Hendrix
Harding Bisons	GAC	Roddy Mote	2026	0	0	–	0	0	–	Bryce Bray	Luke Tribble / Tre'von Biglow	Cameron Tucker
Henderson State Reddies	GAC	Greg Holsworth	2024	16	6	.727	16	6	.727	Ryan O'Hara	Chuck Ross	Will Wagner
Northwestern Oklahoma State Rangers	GAC	Jerry Partridge	2026	0	0	–	149	83	.642	Jonathan Heck	Vacant	Vacant
Oklahoma Baptist Bison	GAC	Chris Jensen	2012	48	85	.361	48	85	.361	Daniel Eaton	Tyler Roberts	Austin Holton
Ouachita Baptist Tigers	GAC	Todd Knight	1999	169	106	.615	197	138	.588	Jay Derby	Brady Carson	Jaden Davis
Southeastern Oklahoma State Savage Storm	GAC	Bo Atterberry	2023	48	41	.539	89	69	.563	Rich McGuire	Troy Parker	Vacant
Southern Arkansas Muleriders	GAC	Brad Smiley	2022	32	13	.711	32	13	.711	Kyle Washington	Dionte Dean	Vacant
Southern Nazarene Crimson Storm	GAC	Dustin Hada	2020	17	42	.288	17	42	.288	Vacant	Indy Siehndel	Kenneth West
Southwestern Oklahoma State Bulldogs	GAC	Andrew Rice	2024	9	13	.409	9	13	.409	Zach Allen	Mike Lucas	Collin Leyden
Davenport Panthers	GLIAC	Sparky McEwen	2017	45	42	.517	45	42	.517	Sam Parker	Adrian McEwen	Lavelle Walker
Ferris State Bulldogs	GLIAC	Tony Annese	2012	151	21	.878	151	21	.878	Steve Annese	Tony Annese Jr. / Grant Caserta	Vacant
Grand Valley State Lakers	GLIAC	Scott Wooster	2023	29	7	.806	29	7	.806	Eli Reinhart	Jim Louis	Vacant
Michigan Tech Huskies	GLIAC	Dan Mettlach	2023	19	13	.594	19	13	.594	Vacant	Bryan Thomas	Phil Milbrath
Northern Michigan Wildcats	GLIAC	Matt Janus	2026	0	0	–	45	14	.763	Boomer Roepke	Ryan Bright	Vacant
Roosevelt Lakers	GLIAC	Billy McKeon	2025	2	8	.200	2	8	.200	C.J. Davis / Ryan Olson	Patton Fitzpatrick	Brent Johnson
Saginaw Valley State Cardinals	GLIAC	Michael Engle	2026	0	0	–	0	0	–	Cole Hoover	Jacob Pardonnet	Jack Connolly
Wayne State Warriors	GLIAC	Terrence Isaac	2026	0	0	–	28	21	.571	Donny Moore	Toby Thurman	Marc Hull
Indianapolis Greyhounds	GLVC	Chris Keevers	2019	58	14	.806	58	14	.806	Vacant	Rahju Blackmon	Vacant
Lincoln Blue Tigers	GLVC	Moses Harper	2024	3	19	.136	3	19	.136	Calvin Powell	Tony Gilbert	Kory Vaught
McKendree Bearcats	GLVC	Jason Rejfek	2024	9	13	.409	9	13	.409	Thomas Jenkins	Dalton Franks	Jackson Hall
Missouri S&T Miners	GLVC	Andy Ball	2022	17	26	.395	17	26	.395	Vacant	Corey Sudhoff	Vacant
Quincy Hawks	GLVC	Jason Killday	2024	11	9	.550	11	9	.550	Kade Warner	Elijah Shaah	Damani Neal
Southwest Baptist Bearcats	GLVC	Paul Hansen	2025	3	7	.300	33	29	.532	Vacant	Ethan Smith	Vacant
Truman Bulldogs	GLVC	Kellen Nesbitt	2024	16	8	.667	16	8	.667	Austin Zoda	Jeramey Dockery	Vacant
Upper Iowa Peacocks	GLVC	Jason Hoskins	2021	20	35	.364	20	35	.364	Max Longman	Rhett Mizer	Vacant
William Jewell Cardinals	GLVC	Jason Ambroson	2024	8	14	.364	8	14	.364	Corey Bethany	Mark Faubion	Steve Wright
Ashland Eagles	G-MAC	Doug Geiser	2023	27	9	.750	27	9	.750	A.J. Nickoli	Tim Rose	Vacant
Findlay Oilers	G-MAC	Tyler Johns	2026	0	0	–	0	0	–	Blaise Holzer	Mike Ridings	Joe Vacik
Hillsdale Chargers	G-MAC	Nate Shreffler	2024	12	10	.545	12	10	.545	Brad Otterbein	Steve Otterbein	Nick Galvan / Ryan Stokes
Kentucky Wesleyan Panthers	G-MAC	Tyrone Young	2022	8	36	.182	8	36	.182	Anthony Payton	Ramond Jackson	Jacob Brison
Lake Erie Storm	G-MAC	David Price	2024	4	18	.182	4	18	.182	Thomas Hearn / Tim Kennedy	Drew McGaughy	Macklin Coleman
Northwood Timberwolves	G-MAC	Dustin Beurer	2023	20	14	.588	49	19	.721	Jason Miran	Justin Sweeney	E. J. Arnold
Ohio Dominican Panthers	G-MAC	Kelly Cummings	2016	61	40	.604	61	40	.604	Travis Everhart	Vacant	Eric Copeland
Thomas More Saints	G-MAC	Chris Norwell	2022	16	28	.364	16	28	.364	Bill Garvey	Brad Zink	Devon Fisher
Tiffin Dragons	G-MAC	Zack Blair	2026	0	0	–	0	0	–	Caleb Rufener	Dan McKeown	Dwight Jackson
Walsh Cavaliers	G-MAC	John Fankhauser	2018	25	55	.313	25	55	.313	Jim Purtill	Adam Ferback	Vacant
Delta State Statesmen	GSC	David Dean	2026	0	0	–	127	47	.730	Vacant	Tripp Thomas	Clay Isbell
Valdosta State Blazers	GSC	Graham Craig	2025	6	5	.545	6	5	.545	Brice Carlson	Greg Harris	Aidan Panni
West Alabama Tigers	GSC	Scott Cochran	2025	5	4	.556	5	4	.556	Carmen Felus	Tanner Luker	Max Arnold Jr.
Northeastern State RiverHawks	Independent	Darrin Chiaverini	2024	9	12	.429	20	12	.625	Vacant	Jeremy Atwell	Vacant
Angelo State Rams	LSC	Jeff Girsch	2019	55	20	.733	55	20	.733	Jason Johnson	Joe Ford	Tyler O'Bryan
Central Washington Wildcats	LSC	Scott Power	2026	0	0	–	0	0	–	Sam King	Tyler Stinn	Vacant
Eastern New Mexico Greyhounds	LSC	Art Briles	2026	0	0	–	99	65	.604	Cameron Nellor	Jeff Hulme	Vacant
Midwestern State Mustangs	LSC	Rich Renner	2024	7	15	.318	7	15	.318	Kirk Bryant	Vacant	Vacant
Sul Ross Lobos	LSC	Lee Hays	2025	0	11	.000	0	11	.000	Vacant	Vacant	Vacant
Texas A&M–Kingsville Javelinas	LSC	Scott Parr	2025	5	6	.455	5	6	.455	Vacant	Cortez Carter	Gerard Wilcher
Texas A&M–Texarkana Eagles	LSC	Joshua Eargle (Note: Eargle was hired in December 2025.)	2027	0	0	–	14	16	.467	Vacant	Brock Caraboa	Luke Roth
UT Permain Basin Falcons	LSC	Chris Softley	2026	0	0	–	0	0	–	Elliott Wratten	Josh Bookbinder	Ryan Conry
West Texas A&M Buffaloes	LSC	Josh Lynn	2023	15	17	.469	80	67	.544	Kevin Bleil	Justin Richter	Kendrick Marshall
Western New Mexico Mustangs	LSC	Billy Hickman	2023	10	23	.303	10	23	.303	AC Patterson	Austin Bortle	Deion Melvin
Western Oregon Wolves	LSC	Arne Ferguson	2005	117	99	.542	117	99	.542	Brian Harris	Vacant	Matt Overlin
Charleston Golden Eagles	MEC	Mike Tesch	2025	8	3	.727	8	3	.727	Adam Carr	Alex Daugherty	Hunter Becker
Concord Mountain Lions	MEC	Cody Edwards	2025	4	7	.364	4	7	.364	Benton Duby	Dante Johnson	Jake Gleason
Fairmont State Falcons	MEC	Luke Barker	2024	13	9	.591	13	9	.591	Brandon Lemon	Zack Johnson	Justice Lucas
Frostburg State Bobcats	MEC	Eric Wagoner	2022	32	13	.711	32	13	.711	Trevor Miller	Eric Rhodes	Derek Prather
Glenville State Pioneers	MEC	Jake Casteel	2026	0	0	–	0	0	–	Nate Mullen	Vacant	Az-Zahir Smith
Shawnee State Bears	MEC	Mark Snyder (Note: Snyder was hired in March 2026.)	2028	0	0	–	22	37	.373	Greg Forest	Vacant	Vacant
West Liberty Hilltoppers	MEC	Chad Salisbury	2026	0	0	–	0	0	–	Philip Hamilton	Anthony Kellar	Jucqui Taylor
West Virginia State Yellow Jackets	MEC	John Pennington	2017	49	42	.538	49	42	.538	Matt Cavallaro	Rashad Jackson / Brian Reynolds	Vacant
West Virginia Wesleyan Bobcats	MEC	Mike Kellar	2026	0	0	–	87	67	.565	Jeremy Harmer	Mott Gaymon	Vacant
Wheeling Cardinals	MEC	Zac Bruney	2019	32	37	.464	32	37	.464	Steve McNeely	Arthur Smith	Brandon Robinson
Central Missouri Mules	MIAA	Josh Lamberson	2022	29	18	.617	30	39	.435	Hayden Hawk	Rich Wright	Neil Novak
Central Oklahoma Bronchos	MIAA	Adam Dorrel	2022	28	18	.609	123	58	.680	Patrick Briningstool	Cody Swanson	Jesse Harwell
Emporia State Hornets	MIAA	Garin Higgins	2007	118	90	.567	169	99	.631	Vincent Cashdollar	Jace McDown	Cade Harelson
Fort Hays State Tigers	MIAA	Chris Brown	2011	95	63	.601	95	63	.601	Tom Ross	Cooper Harris / Layton Hickel	Vacant
Missouri Southern Lions	MIAA	Atiba Bradley	2020	18	38	.321	18	38	.321	Colton Meyers	Joe Bettasso	Vacant
Missouri Western Griffons	MIAA	Tyler Fenwick	2023	15	19	.441	68	67	.504	Todd Throckmorton	Erik Johnson	Colin McQuillan
Nebraska–Kearney Lopers	MIAA	Ryan Held	2023	14	19	.424	49	74	.398	Tyler Harris	Tim Schaffner	Jake Mandelko
Northwest Missouri State Bearcats	MIAA	John McMenamin	2025	9	3	.750	16	7	.696	Collin Prosser	Chad Bostwick	Jake Willrich
Pittsburg State Gorillas	MIAA	Tom Anthony	2024	18	6	.750	18	6	.750	Mark Smith	Lynn Nutt / Tyrell Everett	Gregg Hollins
Washburn Ichabods	MIAA	Zach Watkins	2025	3	8	.273	3	8	.273	Dane Simoneau	Kaleb Koch	Jarvis Harrod
American International Yellow Jackets	NE-10	Daniel Chipka	2024	6	15	.286	6	15	.286	Connor Floden	Michael Blochowski	Dan Wollman
Assumption Greyhounds	NE-10	Andy McKenzie	2018	45	28	.616	45	28	.616	Evan Eastburn	David Castillo	Vacant
Bentley Falcons	NE-10	CJ Scarpa	2025	7	4	.636	7	4	.636	Vacant	Jeff Moore	Brendan Smith
Franklin Pierce Ravens	NE-10	Russell Gaskamp	2019	18	43	.295	53	81	.396	Caden Hinton	Taylor Ewen	Vacant
Pace Setters	NE-10	Chad Walker	2025	0	11	.000	0	11	.000	Conor Gilmartin-Donohue	Roderick Plummer	Vacant
Post Eagles	NE-10	Adam Schultz	2022	6	33	.154	6	33	.154	Vacant	Michael Day	Vacant
Saint Anselm Hawks	NE-10	Joe Adam	2016	33	57	.367	37	63	.370	Vacant	Chadd Braine	Trey McJunkin
Southern Connecticut Fighting Owls	NE-10	Joe Loth	2025	4	6	.400	137	115	.544	John Weiss	Frank Forcucci	Chris Redding
Augustana Vikings	NSIC	Jerry Olszewski	2013	90	47	.657	122	65	.652	Andrew Loudenback	Kelly Scholten	Chase King
Bemidji State Beavers	NSIC	Brent Bolte	2016	75	33	.694	75	33	.694	Jordan Hein	Shevin Smith Jr.	Greg Bower
Concordia Golden Bears	NSIC	Joshua Schumacher	2026	0	0	–	59	25	.702	Jordan Armstrong	Dalton Thomas	Christian Boivin
Jamestown Jimmies	NSIC	Tom Dosch	2026	25	17	.595 (Note: Includes tenure from 2004 to 2007)	78	74	.513	Shane Kelly	Shane Clancy	Tyler Wilson
Mary Marauders	NSIC	Shann Schillinger	2023	8	25	.242	8	25	.242	Austin Brown	Ben Davis	Vacant
Minnesota Duluth Bulldogs	NSIC	Curt Wiese	2013	114	29	.797	123	40	.755	Chase Vogler	Trey Dill	Luke Olson
Minnesota State Mavericks	NSIC	Todd Hoffner	2014	152	41	.788	194	69	.738	Ryan Schlichte	Graham Hevel / Todd Taylor	Jake Iery
Minnesota State–Moorhead Dragons	NSIC	Steve Laqua	2011	73	82	.471	73	82	.471	Vacant	Jesse Currier	Vacant
Minot State Beavers	NSIC	Ian Shields	2023	9	24	.273	49	71	.408	Vacant	Tommy Langford / Darryl McBride	Mike Famiglietti
Northern State Wolves	NSIC	Mike Schmidt	2020	31	24	.564	58	37	.611	Kiefer Price	Vacant	Vacant
Sioux Falls Cougars	NSIC	Jim Glogowski	2023	18	15	.545	55	58	.487	Lucas Lueders	Spencer Capitani	Alex Johnson
Southwest Minnesota State Mustangs	NSIC	Scott Underwood	2022	6	38	.136	92	89	.508	Zac Cunha / Doug Patterson	Levi Bullerman	Vacant
Wayne State Wildcats	NSIC	Logan Masters	2022	31	13	.705	31	13	.705	Brady Rohach	D'Mauria Martin	Will Anglin
Winona State Warriors	NSIC	Brian Curtin	2025	6	5	.545	6	5	.545	Nick Miller	Kendrick Van Ackeren	Nixon Heggie
Bloomsburg Huskies	PSAC	Frank Sheptock	2020	19	35	.352	126	116	.521	Tim Landis	Deon Henry Sr.	Vacant
California Vulcans	PSAC	Gary Dunn	2016	75	27	.735	75	27	.735	Vacant	Jawan Turner	Vacant
Clarion Golden Eagles	PSAC	Raymond Monica	2022	14	29	.326	93	97	.489	Kevin Magouirk	Josh Hager	Vacant
East Stroudsburg Warriors	PSAC	Jimmy Terwilliger	2018	43	27	.614	43	27	.614	Mike Terwilliger	Mike Lackey	Matt Hagelgans
Edinboro Fighting Scots	PSAC	Eric Crandall (interim)	2026	0	0	–	0	0	–	Zach Griffith	Vacant	Max Bryer
Gannon Golden Knights	PSAC	Erik Raeburn	2020	23	34	.404	166	96	.634	Mike Hallett	Rich Yahner	Matt Evans
IUP Crimson Hawks	PSAC	Paul Tortorella	2017	67	23	.744	67	23	.744	Marco Pecora	Jim Smith	Brett Brice
Kutztown Golden Bears	PSAC	Jim Clements	2014	103	30	.774	149	54	.734	Marcel Quarterman	Eric Fargo	Vacant
Lock Haven Bald Eagles	PSAC	Joe Battaglia	2025	6	5	.545	6	5	.545	Jeri Petite Jr.	Michael Derasmo	Vacant
Millersville Marauders	PSAC	Drew Folmar	2026	0	0	–	4	7	.364	Brian Ferguson	Ron Rankin	Rod White Jr.
Seton Hill Griffins	PSAC	Kevin May	2025	4	7	.364	4	7	.364	Jesse Salazar	Ross Fiegener	Jonathan Burrell
Shepherd Rams	PSAC	Ernie McCook	2018	66	22	.750	66	22	.750	Vacant	Josh Kline	Luke Wright
Shippensburg Raiders	PSAC	Drew Gallardy	2026	0	0	–	0	0	–	Brayden Long	Mike Burket	Vacant
Slippery Rock	PSAC	Shawn Lutz	2016	88	25	.779	88	25	.779	Joe Marella	Domenick Razzano	Ron Butschle / Corey Dinger
West Chester Golden Rams	PSAC	Duke Greco	2024	8	13	.381	99	28	.780	Vacant	Nick Brady	Mike Isgro
Adams State Grizzlies	RMAC	Levi Gallas	2025	0	11	.000	0	11	.000	Chase Kyser	Vacant	Caleb Kizewski
Black Hills State Yellow Jackets	RMAC	Josh Breske	2020	26	31	.456	26	31	.456	Drake Davidson	JB Brown	Brendan Hopkins
Chadron State Eagles	RMAC	Jay Long	2012	79	68	.537	94	83	.531	Micah Smith	Clint Sasse	Mitch Collicott
Colorado Mesa Mavericks	RMAC	Miles Kochevar	2022	23	20	.535	23	20	.535	Neil Linhart / Trevor Wikre	Hunter Hughes	Levi Suiaunoa
Colorado Mines Orediggers	RMAC	Bob Stitt	2025	115	66	.635 (Note: Includes tenure from 2000 to 2014)	136	80	.630	Tim Brandon	Scott McLaughlin	Yon Boone
CSU Pueblo ThunderWolves	RMAC	Phil Vigil	2023	28	7	.800	35	22	.614	Neal Davis / Jordan Dodge	Neema Behbahani / Thomas Pearson	Ben WooChing
Fort Lewis Skyhawks	RMAC	Johnny Cox	2022	5	38	.116	5	38	.116	John Grinde	Spencer Brown	Emmanuel Jordan Bible
New Mexico Highlands Cowboys	RMAC	Kurt Taufa'asau	2024	8	14	.364	8	14	.364	Drew Thatcher	Vacant	Gage Guardiola
South Dakota Mines Hardrockers	RMAC	Charlie Flohr	2020	29	30	.492	29	30	.492	Ryan Freeman	Vance Winter	Vacant
Western Colorado Mountaineers	RMAC	Jas Bains	2011	75	86	.466	75	86	.466	Joe McLain	Todd Auer	Jake Van Groll
Anderson Trojans	SAC	Bobby Lamb	2024	8	14	.364	116	93	.555	James Thurn	Brett Hickman / AJ Jones	Vacant
Carson–Newman Eagles	SAC	Tyler Almond	2026	0	0	–	0	0	–	Tanner Fleming	Caleb Goins / Antonio Goss	Anthony Goliver
Catawba Indians	SAC	Tyler Haines	2023	15	18	.455	37	51	.420	Jordan Softcheck	Khanis Hubbard / Tee Overman	Jake Vellucci
Emory and Henry Wasps	SAC	Quintin Hunter	2024	17	5	.773	17	5	.773	Vacant	Mitchell Walters	Parker Coe
Lenoir–Rhyne Bears	SAC	Doug Socha	2024	16	8	.667	70	23	.753	Steve DeMeo	Robbie Owens	Justin Hilliker
Mars Hill Lions	SAC	Kevin Barnette	2025	5	6	.455	5	6	.455	Jonathan Sarratt	Vacant	Vacant
Newberry Wolves	SAC	Todd Knight	2009	108	78	.581	108	78	.581	Cole Watson	Stephen Flynn	Drew Watson
Tusculum Pioneers	SAC	Billy Taylor	2024	2	18	.100	2	18	.100	Brock Pursley	Teddy Gaines	Payton Dixon
UVA Wise Cavaliers	SAC	Gary Bass	2024	5	15	.250	31	57	.352	Tim Ladd	Michael Gould	Vacant
Wingate Bulldogs	SAC	Rashaan Jordan	2024	18	5	.783	18	5	.783	Mike Long	Travis Knight	Vacant
Albany State Golden Rams	SIAC	David Bowser	2026	0	0	–	2	16	.111	Graham Hobbs	Vacant	Christopher Schultz
Allen Yellow Jackets	SIAC	Cedric Pearl	2024	8	13	.381	27	54	.333	Vacant	Vacant	Vacant
Benedict Tigers	SIAC	Ron Dickerson Jr.	2024	14	9	.609	21	24	.467	Stan Clayton	Shea Campbell	Jonah Campbell
Central State Marauders	SIAC	Tony Carter	2025	3	7	.300	3	7	.300	Leon Washington	Pat Clark	Vacant
Clark Atlanta Panthers	SIAC	Terry Sims	2026	0	0	–	38	39	.494	Ashton Green	Corey Barlow	Kevin Pope
Edward Waters Tigers	SIAC	Brian Jenkins	2025	5	5	.500	60	36	.625	Eric Dooley	Darrin Hayes	Vacant
Fort Valley State Wildcats	SIAC	Marlon Watson	2025	4	6	.400	4	6	.400	Willie Totten	Vacant	Vacant
Kentucky State Thorobreds	SIAC	Felton Huggins	2023	17	16	.515	17	16	.515	Steve Wallace	Earl Chambers	Marco Sanchez
Lane Dragons	SIAC	Stanley Conner	2025	0	10	.000	22	56	.282	Vacant	Joseph Carter	Vacant
Miles Golden Bears	SIAC	Chris Goode	2025	3	8	.273	3	8	.273	Vacant	Kenneth Watson	Vacant
Morehouse Maroon Tigers	SIAC	Brad Sherrod	2026	0	0	–	17	6	.739	Freddie Brown Jr.	Terry Lantz	Vacant
Savannah State Tigers	SIAC	Thomas Howard	2026	0	0	–	0	0	–	Quentin Burrell	Clyde Grady	Shawn Thomas
Tuskegee Golden Tigers	SIAC	Aaron James	2023	16	17	.485	16	17	.485	Vacant	O.C. Williams	Vacant

== See also ==
- List of current NCAA Division I FBS football coaches
- List of current NCAA Division I FCS football coaches
- List of current NCAA Division III football coaches
- List of current NAIA football coaches
- List of NCAA Division II football programs
