= 2022 Rocky Mountain Athletic Conference football season =

American college football season

Rocky Mountain Athletic Conference
- Sport: Football
- Teams: 10
- Champion: Colorado Mines

Football seasons

2022 Rocky Mountain Athletic Conference football standings
	Conf.			Overall
Team	W		L	W		L
No. 2 Colorado Mines $^	9	–	0	13	–	3
CSU Pueblo ^	7	–	2	8	–	4
Western Colorado	7	–	2	7	–	4
South Dakota Mines	6	–	3	7	–	4
Black Hills State	5	–	4	7	–	4
Colorado Mesa	3	–	6	4	–	6
New Mexico Highlands	3	–	6	3	–	7
Chadron State	3	–	6	3	–	8
Adams State	2	–	7	2	–	9
Fort Lewis	0	–	9	0	–	10
$ – Conference champion; ^ – NCAA Division II playoff participant; Rankings from AFCA Poll

The 2022 Rocky Mountain Athletic Conference football season was the season of college football played by the ten member schools of the Rocky Mountain Athletic Conference (RMAC) as part of the 2022 NCAA Division II football season.

The Colorado Mines Orediggers won the RMAC championship with a 9–2 record (9–0 against conference opponents), led the conference in both scoring offense (46.86 points per game) and scoring defense (18.64 points per game), and was ranked No. 10 in the final NCAA Division II rankings. The Orediggers' quarterback John Matocha was selected as the RMAC Offensive Player of the Year, and Brandon Moore of Colorado Mines was selected as the RMAC Coach of the Year. The team won in the first three rounds of the NCAA Division II playoffs and faces Shepherd in the semifinals on December 10.

The CSU Pueblo ThunderWolves finished in second place with an 8–4 overall record. CSU Pueblo defensive tacke Trey Botts was named RMAC Defensive Player of the Year.

== Conference overview ==
Conf. rank	Team	Head coach	Overall record	Conf. record	Points scored/game	Points against/game
1	Colorado Mines	Brandon Moore	9–2	9–0	46.86	18.64
2	CSU Pueblo	John Wristen	8–4	7–2	36.0	21.9
3	Western Colorado	Jas Baines	7–4	7–2	31.55	25.64
4	South Dakota Mines	Charlie Flohr	7–4	6–3	31.45	24.09
5	Black Hills State	Josh Breske	7–4	5–4	28.18	20.91
6	Colorado Mesa	Miles Kochevar	4–6	3–6	36.0	32.7
7	New Mexico Highlands	Ron Hudson	3–7	3–6	20.4	31.9
8	Chadron State	Jay Long	3–8	3–6	20.73	32.45
9	Adams State	Jarrell Harrison	2–9	2–7	22.82	37.91
10	Fort Lewis	Johnny Cox	0–10	0–9	8.2	60.7

== Conference awards ==
=== Individual honors ===
- Offensive Player of the Year: John Matocha, Colorado Mines
- Defensive Player of the Year: Trey Botts, CSU Pueblo
- Special Teams Player of the Year: CJ Sims, New Mexico Highlands
- Offensive Freshman of the Year: Landon Walker, Colorado Mines
- Defensive Freshman of the Year: Cooper Brown, Black Hills State
- Coach of the Year: Brandon Moore, Colorado Mines

=== All-RMAC team ===
The following players were selected as first-team players on the 2022 All-RMAC football team.

Offense

- Quarterback - John Matocha, Colorado Mines
- Running backs - Michael Zeman, Colorado Mines; Josh Cummings, Western Colorado
- Wide receivers - Jeremiah Bridges, South Dakota Mines; Josh Johnston, Colorado Mines; CJ Sims, New Mexico Highlands
- Tight end - Dagan Rienks, Colorado Mesa
- Offensive line - Matt Armendariz, Colorado Mines; Sam Ambrogio, Black Hills State; Clayton Martin, Western Colorado; Mathyus Su’a, Western Colorado; Levi Johnson, Colorado Mines

Defense

- Cornerbacks - Mason Pierce, Colorado Mines; Eli Pittman, CSU Pueblo
- Safeties - Daniel Bone, CSU Pueblo; Doodles Quinones, Black Hills State
- Inside linebackers - Kyante Christian, South Dakota Mines; Adrian Moreno, Colorado Mines
- Outside linebackers - Mack Minnehan, Colorado Mines; Luke Conilogue, CSU Pueblo
- Defensive tackles - Trey Botts, CSU Pueblo; Tayven Bray, Chadron State
- Defensive ends - Hunter O’Connor, Chadron State; Gavin Chaddock, South Dakota Mines

Special teams

- Kicker - Gunnar Jones, Chadron State
- Punter - Cole Riters, Western Colorado
- Kick returner - Victory David, Western Colorado
- Punt returner - CJ Sims, New Mexico Highlands

== Teams ==
=== Colorado Mines ===
2022 Colorado Mines Orediggers football

RMAC champion

NCAA Division II Championship Game, L 14–41 vs. Ferris State
- Conference: Rocky Mountain Athletic Conference
- Record: 13–3 (9–0 RMAC)
- Head coach: Brandon Moore (1st season)
- Offensive coordinator: Pete Sterbick (4th season)
- Defensive coordinator: Tripp Thomas (1st season)
- Home stadium: Marv Kay Stadium at Alumni Field

The 2022 Colorado Mines Orediggers football team represented the Colorado School of Mines in Golden, Colorado during the 2022 Rocky Mountain Athletic Conference (RMAC) football season. In their first year under head coach Brandon Moore, the Orediggers compiled an overall record of 13–3 with a mark of 9–0 against conference opponents, winning the RMAC championship.

Colorado Mines quarterback John Matocha was selected as the RMAC Offensive Player of the Year, and Brandon Moore was selected as the RMAC Coach of the Year.

Date	Opponent	Rank	Site	Result	Attendance	Source
September 1	at No. 5 Grand Valley State*	No. 4	Lubbers Stadium; Allendale, MI	L 22–25	12,250	
September 10	No. 7 Angelo State*		Marv Kay Stadium at Alumni Field; Golden, CO	L 27–30 ^{OT}	1,863	
September 17	at Adams State	No. 21	Rex Field; Alamosa, CO	W 84–10	0	
September 24	CSU Pueblo	No. 21	Marv Kay Stadium at Alumni Field; Golden, CO	W 45–17	2,922	
October 1	at Chadron State	No. 22	Don Beebe Stadium; Chadron, NE	W 45–9	2,852	
October 8	Colorado Mesa^{†}	No. 21	Marv Kay Stadium at Alumni Field; Golden, CO	W 48–21	4,090	
October 15	at South Dakota Mines	No. 19	O'Harra Stadium; Rapid City, SD	W 48–20	3,415	
October 22	Black Hills State	No. 9/18	Marv Kay Stadium at Alumni Field; Golden, CO	W 38–0	4,578	
October 29	at Western Colorado		Mountaineer Bowl; Gunnison, CO	W 30–20	423	
November 5	at New Mexico Highlands		Sanchez Family Stadium; Las Vegas, NM	W 54–16		
November 12	Fort Lewis		Marv Kay Stadium at Alumni Field; Golden, CO	W 80–0	3,192	
November 19	CSU Pueblo		Marv Kay Stadium at Alumni Field; Golden, CO (NCAA Division II First Round)	W 45–24	2,157	
November 26	No. 19 Minnesota State*		Marv Kay Stadium at Alumni Field; Golden, CO (NCAA Division II Second Round)	W 48–45	2,142	
December 3	at No. 2 Angelo State*		LeGrand Stadium at 1st Community Credit Union Field; San Angelo, TX (NCAA Division II Quarterfinal)	W 42–24	4,872	
December 10	No. 11 Shepherd*		Marv Kay Stadium at Alumni Field; Golden, CO (NCAA Division II Semifinal)	W 44–14	6,191	
December 17	vs. Ferris State*		McKinney ISD Stadium; McKinney, TX (NCAA Division II Championship Game)	L 14–41	6,333	
*Non-conference game; ^{†}Homecoming; Rankings from Coaches' Poll released prior to the game

=== CSU Pueblo ===
2022 CSU Pueblo ThunderWolves football

NCAA Division II First Round, L 24–45 at Colorado Mines
- Conference: Rocky Mountain Athletic Conference
- Record: 8–4 (7–2 RMAC)
- Head coach: John Wristen (15th season)
- Offensive coordinator: Daren Wilkinson (3rd season)
- Defensive coordinator: Levi Suiaunoa (1st season)
- Home stadium: ThunderBowl

The 2022 CSU Pueblo ThunderWolves football team represented the Colorado State University Pueblo in Pueblo, Colorado, during the 2022 Rocky Mountain Athletic Conference (RMAC) football season. In their 15th year under head coach John Wristen, the ThunderWolves compiled an 8–4 record (7–2 against conference opponents) and finished second in the RMAC.

CSU Pueblo defensive tackle Trey Botts was selected as the RMAC Defensive Player of the Year.

Date	Opponent	Rank	Site	Result	Attendance	Source
September 3	at No. 24 Midwestern State (TX)*		Memorial Stadium; Wichita Falls, TX	W 59–27	7,123	
September 10	No. 4 Grand Valley State*	No. 21	ThunderBowl; Pueblo, CO	L 10–35	5,990	
September 17	Western Colorado		ThunderBowl; Pueblo, CO	L 10–17	7,088	
September 24	at No. 21 Colorado Mines		Marv Kay Stadium at Alumni Field; Golden, CO	L 17–45	2,922	
October 1	Fort Lewis^{†}		ThunderBowl; Pueblo, CO	W 75–3	5,997	
October 8	at Adams State		Rex Field; Alamosa, CO	W 52–20	2,387	
October 15	New Mexico Highlands		ThunderBowl; Pueblo, CO	W 35–11	6,121	
October 22	Chadron State		ThunderBowl; Pueblo, CO	W 34–12	5,954	
October 29	at Colorado Mesa		Stocker Stadium; Grand Junction, CO	W 33–28	3,068	
November 5	South Dakota Mines		ThunderBowl; Pueblo, CO	W 45–20	6,188	
November 12	at Black Hills State		Lyle Hare Stadium; Spearfish, SD	W 38–0	1,123	
November 19	at Colorado Mines		Marv Kay Stadium at Alumni Field; Golden, CO (NCAA Division II First Round)	L 24–45	2,157	
*Non-conference game; ^{†}Homecoming; Rankings from Coaches' Poll released prior to the game

=== Western Colorado ===
2022 Western Colorado Mountaineers football
- Conference: Rocky Mountain Athletic Conference
- Record: 7–4 (7–2 RMAC)
- Head coach: Jas Bains (12th season)
- Defensive coordinator: Todd Auer (7th season)
- Home stadium: Mountaineer Bowl

The 2022 Western Colorado Mountaineers football team represented the Western Colorado University in Gunnison, Colorado, during the 2022 Rocky Mountain Athletic Conference (RMAC) football season. In their 12th year under head coach Jas Baines, the Mountaineers compiled a 7–4 record (7–2 against conference opponents) and finished third in the RMAC.

Date	Opponent	Rank	Site	Result	Attendance	Source
September 3	at West Texas A&M*	No. 17	Buffalo Stadium; Canyon, TX	L 6–44	6,781	
September 10	at Texas Permian Basin*		Astound Broadband Stadium; Midland, TX	L 31–34 ^{OT}	3,278	
September 17	at CSU Pueblo		Mountaineer Bowl; Pueblo, CO	W 17–10	7,088	
September 24	Chadron State		Mountaineer Bowl; Gunnison, CO	W 56–28	240	
October 1	at Colorado Mesa		Stocker Stadium; Grand Junction, CO	W 42–34 ^{2OT}	3,691	
October 8	South Dakota Mines^{†}		Mountaineer Bowl; Gunnison, CO	L 10–38	324	
October 15	at Black Hills State		Lyle Hare Stadium; Spearfish, SD	W 28–27	1,162	
October 22	at New Mexico Highlands		Sanchez Family Stadium; Las Vegas, NM	W 30–13	0	
October 29	Colorado Mines		Mountaineer Bowl; Gunnison, CO	L 20–30	423	
November 5	at Fort Lewis		Ray Dennison Memorial Field; Durango, CO	W 55–14	1,791	
November 12	Adams State		Katy O Rady Field; Gunnison, CO (Colorado Classic)	W 52–10	500	
*Non-conference game; ^{†}Homecoming; Rankings from Coaches' Poll released prior to the game

=== South Dakota Mines ===
2022 South Dakota Mines Hardrockers football
- Conference: Rocky Mountain Athletic Conference
- Record: 7–4 (6–3 RMAC)
- Head coach: Charlie Flohr (3rd season)
- Offensive coordinator: Ryan Gent (3rd season)
- Defensive coordinator: Vance Winter (3rd season)
- Home stadium: Dunham Field at O'Harra Stadium

The 2022 South Dakota Mines Hardrockers football team represented the South Dakota School of Mines and Technology in Rapid City, South Dakota, during the 2022 Rocky Mountain Athletic Conference football season. In their third year under head coach Charlie Flohr, the Hardrockers compiled a 7–4 record (6–3 against RMAC opponents) and finished fourth in the RMAC.

Date	Opponent	Site	Result	Attendance	Source
September 1	at Missouri S&T*	Allgood–Bailey Stadium; Rolla, MO	W 43–20	2,796	
September 10	Truman State*	Dunham Field at O'Harra Stadium; Rapid City, SD	L 20–27	1,955	
September 17	at Colorado Mesa	Stocker Stadium; Grand Junction, CO	W 31–17	3,876	
September 24	New Mexico Highlands	Dunham Field at O'Harra Stadium; Rapid City, SD	W 41–27	3,584	
October 1	Black Hills State	Dunham Field at O'Harra Stadium; Rapid City, SD (Black Hills Brawl)	L 17–24	4,985	
October 8	at Western Colorado	Mountaineer Bowl; Gunnison, CO	W 38–10	324	
October 15	No. 19 Colorado Mines	Dunham Field at O'Harra Stadium; Rapid City, SD	L 20–48	3,415	
October 22	at Fort Lewis	Ray Dennison Memorial Field; Durango, CO	W 65–20	2,179	
October 29	Adams State	Dunham Field at O'Harra Stadium; Rapid City, SD	W 23–20	1,320	
November 5	at CSU Pueblo	ThunderBowll; Pueblo, CO	L 20–45	6,188	
November 12	Chadron State	Dunham Field at O'Harra Stadium; Rapid City, SD	W 28–7	2,200	
*Non-conference game; Rankings from Coaches' Poll released prior to the game

=== Black Hills State ===
2022 Black Hills State Yellow Jackets football
- Conference: Rocky Mountain Athletic Conference
- Record: 7–4 (5–4 RMAC)
- Head coach: Josh Breske (3rd season)
- Offensive coordinator: Ben Blake (3rd season)
- Defensive coordinator: JB Brown (3rd season)
- Home stadium: Lyle Hare Stadium

The 2022 Black Hills State Yellow Jackets football team represented Black Hills State University in Spearfish, South Dakota, during the 2022 Rocky Mountain Athletic Conference football season. In their third year under head coach Josh Breske, the Yellow Jackets compiled a 7–4 record (5–4 against RMAC opponents) and finished fifth in the RMAC.

Cooper Brown was selected as the RMAC Defensive Freshman of the Year.

Date	Opponent	Site	Result	Attendance	Source
September 1	at Dickinson State*	Henry Biesiot Activities Center; Dickinson, ND	W 17–2		
September 10	William Jewell*	Lyle Hare Stadium; Spearfish, SD	W 38–19	1,226	
September 17	at Chadron State	Don Beebe Stadium; Chadron, NE	W 32–23		
September 24	Colorado Mesa^{†}	Lyle Hare Stadium; Spearfish, SD	W 31–28	2,763	
October 1	at South Dakota Mines	O'Harra Stadium; Rapid City, SD	W 24–17	4,985	
October 8	at New Mexico Highlands	Sanchez Family Stadium; Las Vegas, NV	L 28–30		
October 15	Western Colorado	Lyle Hare Stadium; Spearfish, SD	L 27–28	1,162	
October 22	at No. 9/18 Colorado Mines	Marv Kay Stadium at Alumni Field; Golden, CO	L 0–38	4,578	
October 29	Fort Lewis	Lyle Hare Stadium; Spearfish, SD	W 75–0	1,394	
November 5	at Adams State	Rex Field; Alamosa, CO	W 38–7	1,598	
November 12	CSU Pueblo	Lyle Hare Stadium; Spearfish, SD	L 0–38	1,123	
*Non-conference game; ^{†}Homecoming; Rankings from Coaches' Poll released prior to the game

=== Colorado Mesa ===
2022 Colorado Mesa Mavericks football
- Conference: Rocky Mountain Athletic Conference
- Record: 4–6 (3–6 RMAC)
- Head coach: Miles Kochevar (1st season)
- Offensive coordinator: Tom Thenell (1st season)
- Co-offensive coordinator: Trevor Wikre (1st season)
- Defensive coordinator: Trent Matthews (1st season)
- Home stadium: Stocker Stadium

The 2022 Colorado Mesa Mavericks football team represented Colorado Mesa University in Grand Junction, Colorado, during the 2022 Rocky Mountain Athletic Conference football season. In their first year under head coach Miles Kochevar, the Mavericks compiled a 4–6 record (3–6 against RMAC opponents) and finished sixth in the RMAC.

Date	Opponent	Site	Result	Attendance	Source
September 1	at William Jewell*	Greene Stadium; Liberty, MO	W 37–14		
September 17	South Dakota Mines	Stocker Stadium; Grand Junction, CO	L 17–31	3,876	
September 24	at Black Hills State	Lyle Hare Stadium; Spearfish, SD	L 28–31	2,763	
October 1	Western Colorado	Stocker Stadium; Grand Junction, CO	L 34–42 ^{2OT}	3,691	
October 8	at No. 21 Colorado Mines	Marv Kay Stadium at Alumni Field; Golden, CO	L 21–48	4,090	
October 15	Fort Lewis	Stocker Stadium; Grand Junction, CO	W 70–10	1,975	
October 22	at Adams State	Rex Field; Alamosa, CO	L 31–45	1,376	
October 29	CSU Pueblo^{†}	Stocker Stadium; Grand Junction, CO	L 28–33	3,068	
November 5	at Chadron State	Don Beebe Stadium; Chadron, NE	W 38–37 ^{OT}	1,741	
November 12	New Mexico Highlands	Stocker Stadium; Grand Junction, CO	W 56–36		
*Non-conference game; ^{†}Homecoming; Rankings from Coaches' Poll released prior to the game

=== New Mexico Highlands ===
2022 New Mexico Highlands Cowboys football
- Conference: Rocky Mountain Athletic Conference
- Record: 3–7 (3–6 RMAC)
- Head coach: Ron Hudson (1st season)
- Defensive coordinator: Roderick Plummer (1st season)
- Home stadium: Sanchez Family Stadium

The 2022 New Mexico Highlands Cowboys football team represented New Mexico Highlands University in Las Vegas, New Mexico, during the 2022 Rocky Mountain Athletic Conference football season. Led by first-year head coach Ron Hudson, the Mavericks compiled a 3–7 record (3–6 against RMAC opponents) and finished seventh in the RMAC.

New Mexico Highlands punt returner CJ Sims was selected as the RMAC Special Teams Player of the Year.

Date	Opponent	Site	Result	Attendance	Source
September 1	Eastern New Mexico*	Sanchez Family Stadium; Las Vegas, NM	L 18–34		
September 17	Fort Lewis^{†}	Sanchez Family Stadium; Las Vegas, NM	W 27–3		
September 24	at South Dakota Mines	Dunham Field at O'Harra Stadium; Rapid City, SD	L 27–41	3,584	
October 1	at Adams State	Rex Field; Alamosa, CO	W 23–21	1,769	
October 8	Black Hills State	Sanchez Family Stadium; Las Vegas, NM	W 30–28		
October 15	at CSU Pueblo	ThunderBowl; Pueblo, CO	L 11–35	6,121	
October 22	Western Colorado	Sanchez Family Stadium; Las Vegas, NM	L 13–30	0	
October 29	at Chadron State	Don Beebe Stadium; Chadron, NE	L 3–17	1,236	
November 5	Colorado Mines	Sanchez Family Stadium; Las Vegas, NM	L 16–54		
November 12	at Colorado Mesa	Stocker Stadium; Grand Junction, CO	L 36–56		
*Non-conference game; ^{†}Homecoming

=== Chadron State ===
2022 Chadron State Eagles football
- Conference: Rocky Mountain Athletic Conference
- Record: 3–8 (3–6 RMAC)
- Head coach: Jay Long (11th season)
- Offensive coordinator: Micah Smith (1st season)
- Defensive coordinator: Clint Sasse (2nd season)
- Home stadium: Don Beebe Stadium

The 2022 Chadron State Eagles football team represented Chadron State College in Chadron, Nebraska, during the 2022 Rocky Mountain Athletic Conference (RMAC) football season. In their 11th season under head coach Jay Long, the Eagles compiled a 3–8 record (3–6 against conference opponents) and finished eighth in the RMAC.

Date	Opponent	Site	Result	Attendance	Source
September 1	at No. 7 Angelo State*	LeGrand Stadium at 1st Community Credit Union Field; San Angelo, TX	L 0–35	2,676	
September 10	at Utah Tech*	Greater Zion Stadium; St. George, UT	L 10–56	4,169	
September 17	Black Hills State	Don Beebe Stadium; Chadron, NE	L 23–32		
September 24	at Western Colorado	Mountaineer Bowl; Gunnison, CO	L 28–56	240	
October 1	No. 22 Colorado Mines^{†}	Don Beebe Stadium; Chadron, NE	L 9–45	2,852	
October 8	at Fort Lewis	Ray Dennison Memorial Field; Durango, CO	W 56–3	1,796	
October 15	Adams State	Don Beebe Stadium; Chadron, NE	W 29–27	1,912	
October 22	at CSU Pueblo	ThunderBowl; Pueblo, CO	L 12–34	5,954	
October 29	New Mexico Highlands	Don Beebe Stadium; Chadron, NE	W 17–3	1,236	
November 5	Colorado Mesa	Don Beebe Stadium; Chadron, NE	L 37–38 ^{OT}	1,741	
November 12	at South Dakota Mines	O'Harra Stadium; Rapid City, SD	L 7–28		
*Non-conference game; ^{†}Homecoming; Rankings from Coaches' Poll released prior to the game

=== Adams State ===
2022 Adams State Grizzlies football
- Conference: Rocky Mountain Athletic Conference
- Record: 2–9 (2–7 RMAC)
- Head coach: Jarrell Harrison (2nd season)
- Offensive coordinator: Adrian Riley (2nd season)
- Defensive coordinator: Kai Ellis (6th season)
- Home stadium: Rex Field

The 2022 Adams State Grizzlies football team represented Adams State University in Alamosa, Colorado, during the 2022 Rocky Mountain Athletic Conference (RMAC) football season. In their second year under head coach Jarrell Harrison, the Grizzlies compiled a 2–9 record (2–7 against conference opponents) and finished ninth in the RMAC.

Date	Opponent	Site	Result	Attendance	Source
September 3	at Western New Mexico*	Ben Altamirano Field; Silver City, NM	L 20–34	1,057	
September 10	No. 23 West Texas A&M*	Rex Field; Alamosa, CO	L 19–34	1,543	
September 17	No. 21 Colorado Mines	Rex Field; Alamosa, CO	L 10–84		
September 24	at Fort Lewis	Ray Dennison Memorial Field; Durango, CO	W 52–17	1,903	
October 1	New Mexico Highlands	Rex Field; Alamosa, CO	L 21–23	1,769	
October 8	CSU Pueblo	Rex Field; Alamosa, CO	L 20–52	2,387	
October 15	at Chadron State	Don Beebe Stadium; Chadron, NE	L 27–29	1,912	
October 22	Colorado Mesa	Rex Field; Alamosa, CO	W 45–31	1,376	
October 29	at South Dakota Mines	O'Harra Stadium; Rapid City, SD	L 20–23		
November 5	Black Hills State	Rex Field; Alamosa, CO	L 7–38	1,598	
November 12	at Western Colorado	Katy O Rady Field; Gunnison, CO	L 10–52	500	
*Non-conference game; Rankings from Coaches' Poll released prior to the game

=== Fort Lewis ===
2022 Fort Lewis Skyhawks football
- Conference: Rocky Mountain Athletic Conference
- Record: 0–10 (0–9 RMAC)
- Head coach: Johnny Cox (1st season)
- Offensive coordinator: John Grinde (1st season)
- Defensive coordinator: Spencer Brown (1st season)
- Home stadium: Ray Dennison Memorial Field

The 2022 Fort Lewis Skyhawks football team represented Fort Lewis College in Durango, Colorado, during the 2022 Rocky Mountain Athletic Conference (RMAC) football season. Under head coach Johnny Cox, the Grizzlies compiled a 0–10 record (0–9) against conference opponents) and finished last in the RMAC. In July 2022, Spencer Brown was appointed as the team's new defensive coordinator. With Brown as defensive coordinator, the Skyhawks gave up an average of 60.7 points per game.

Date	Opponent	Site	Result	Attendance	Source
September 10	Arizona Christian*	Ray Dennison Memorial Field; Durango, CO	L 12–52	2,130	
September 17	at New Mexico Highlands	Sanchez Family Stadium; Las Vegas, NM	L 3–27		
September 24	Adams State	Ray Dennison Memorial Field; Durango, CO	L 17–52	1,903	
October 1	at CSU Pueblo	ThunderBowl; Pueblo, CO	L 3–75	5,997	
October 8	Chadron State	Ray Dennison Memorial Field; Durango, CO	L 3–56	1,796	
October 15	at Colorado Mesa	Stocker Stadium; Grand Junction, CO	L 10–70	1,975	
October 22	South Dakota Mines^{†}	Ray Dennison Memorial Field; Durango, CO	L 20–65	2,179	
October 29	at Black Hills State	Lyle Hare Stadium; Spearfish, SD	L 0–75	1,394	
November 5	Western Colorado	Ray Dennison Memorial Field; Durango, CO	L 14–55	1,791	
November 12	at No. 11/8 Colorado Mines	Marv Kay Stadium; Golden, CO	L 0–80	3,192	
*Non-conference game; ^{†}Homecoming; Rankings from Coaches' Poll released prior to the game
