= Hoctor =

Hoctor is a surname. Notable people with the surname include:

- Harriet Hoctor (1905–1977), American ballerina and actress
- John Hoctor (1916–2004), American football player and coach
- Máire Hoctor (born 1963), Irish politician

== See also ==
- Hoctor's Ballet, an orchestra composition
