= Roepke =

Roepke is a surname. Notable people with the surname include:

- Carl Roepke, American luger
- Gabriela Roepke (1920–2013), Chilean playwright, actress, writer, and professor
- Johnny Roepke (1905–1962), American football player
- Walter Karl Johann Roepke (1882–1961), German entomologist
- Walt Roepke, American football player
