= List of Iota Phi Theta members =

Following is a list of notable members of Iota Phi Theta.

== Academia ==
Name	Original chapter	Notability	Ref.
Brian K. Johnson		former President of Montgomery College (Maryland)	
J. Keith Motley	Omicron	Chancellor of the University of Massachusetts	
Stephen Ray		President of Chicago Theological Seminary	

== Business ==
Name / Original chapter / Notability / Ref.; Harry C. Alford / Alpha Alpha Omega / co-founder and former President/CEO, National Black Chamber of Commerce

== Entertainment ==
Name	Original chapter	Notability	Ref.
Terrence C. Carson	Alpha Lambda	television, film, and theater actor, Living Single, Star Wars: Clone Wars (2003 TV series)	
Spencer Christian	Beta	Author and former Meteorologist, Good Morning America, KGO-TV	
Mike City	Alpha Epsilon	music producer	
Kendrick Dean	Gamma Omicron	Grammy Nominated music producer and songwriter	
Dezi Arnez Hines II		television and film actor, Boyz n the Hood, House Party (film), Harlem Nights, Law & Order	
Anthony Downing	Alpha Lambda	co-host of Homecoming with the Downing Brothers podcast, television co-host of Double Down (HGTV), Backyard Bar Wars	
Drew Fraser		comedian best known for appearances on Def Comedy Jam and Comedy Central Presents. Also known as a writer for I Love the 70s, VH1.	
Rudy Gay Sr.	Mu	original member of the singing group Ace Spectrum, which signed with Atlantic Records (Don't Send Nobody Else, Live and Learn, Keep Holdin' On, etc.)	
Webster Lewis	Alpha	composer, musician, educator; Honorable Founder of Iota Phi Theta Fraternity, Inc. (deceased)	
Rick Jackson		former news broadcaster for NBC, CBS, and the FOX Broadcasting Company. Currently the face of Birmingham, Alabama Water supply works public relations.	
George Nock	Alpha	artist and former NFL running back, Washington Redskins	
Jason Manuel Olazabal	Beta Sigma	film, theater, and television actor (Law & Order, Dexter (TV series), Fear the Walking Dead)	
Langston A. Williams	Alpha Eta	director and writer, short film Stay Woke (2018)	

== Politics and government ==
Name	Original chapter	Notability	Ref.
Ashley Bell	Delta Phi	Entrepreneurship Policy Advisor, White House	
Kenny Burgos	Delta Rho	New York State Assemblyman 85th district	
Frank McCall	Alpha Beta	Chief, Ferguson Police Department (Missouri)	
Billy Ocasio	Alpha Lambda	Senior Advisor to Illinois Governor Pat Quinn; former Alderman, Chicago, Illinois	
Bobby Rush	Eta Omega	Civil Rights activist and Illinois Congressman	
Bishop Talbert W. Swan, II	Beta Beta	Pastor, Prelate, Church Of God In Christ, Activist, Author	
W. Montague Winfield		Retired General, U.S. Army	

== Sports ==
Name	Original chapter	Notability	Ref.
DeAnthony Arnett	Gamma Mu	former NFL player, Seattle Seahawks	
Vaughn Booker	Beta Epsilon	former NFL defensive end, Cincinnati Bengals	
Ron Brace	Rho Omega	former NFL defensive tackle for the New England Patriots	
Shilique Calhoun	Gamma Mu	NFL Linebacker, New England Patriots	
Maurice Flowers	Beta Theta	Head Coach of Fort Valley State University Wildcats football program	
Tommie Frazier		former University of Nebraska–Lincoln quarterback, only player named Most Valuable Player of three consecutive national championship games	
Stephfon Green	Eta Alpha	NFL running back	
Elvin Hayes	Alpha Nu Omega	former NBA player and Naismith Memorial Basketball Hall of Fame inductee	
Chidi Iwuoma	Gamma Zeta	former NFL defensive back and recruiting coach, Tennessee Titans	
Larry Johnson		defensive line and associate head coach, The Ohio State University	
Dave Leitao	Omicron	DePaul University men's basketball head coach	
Melvin Lister		2000 and 2004 Summer Olympics men's long jumper	
Calvin Murphy	Alpha Nu Omega	former NBA player and Naismith Memorial Basketball Hall of Fame inductee	
Hamady N'Diaye		former NBA player, former Rutgers University basketball player	
Ollie Ogbu	Eta Alpha	Defensive Line coach for The University of New Haven, former NFL defensive tackle	
Philip Quaye	Iota Beta	NE-10 three time Gold medal winning heptathlon champion	
Christon Staples		Harlem Globetrotter, 2 time Slam Dunk Guinness World Records Holder	
Devon Still	Eta Alpha	former NFL defensive tackle, New York Jets	
John Allen Sykes	Alpha	former NFL player, San Diego Chargers	
Jermaine Taylor	Epsilon Eta	former NBA player, Salt Lake City Stars	
Lawrence Thomas	Gamma Mu	NFL defensive end, New York Jets. Recipient of 40th Ed Block Courage Award	
Johnnie Troutman	Eta Alpha	NFL offensive tackle	
RJ Williamson	Gamma Mu	former NFL player, Green Bay Packers	
Chris Wilson		former NFL linebacker, San Diego Chargers	
Kirby Wilson	Alpha Lambda	former running backs coach for the NFL’s Las Vegas Raiders	
