= 2023 HBCU Legacy Bowl =

American college football all-star game

- 2nd HBCU Legacy Bowl
Team Gaither	Team Robinson
3	10
Head coach: Richard Hayes Jr. & Trei Oliver	Head coach: Chennis Berry & Eric Dooley
	1	2	3	4	Total
Team Gaither	0	3	0	0	3
Team Robinson	3	0	7	0	10
- Date: February 25, 2023
- Season: 2022
- Stadium: Yulman Stadium
- Location: New Orleans, Louisiana
- MVP: Xavier Smith (WR, Florida A&M) & Jason Dumas (DL, Southern)
- National anthem: Sharandall Lewis
- Halftime show: Alabama State University Marching Hornets
- Attendance: 25,900

United States TV coverage
- Network: NFL Network
- Announcers: Steve Wyche, Charles Davis, Bucky Brooks, Sherree Burruss

The 2023 HBCU Legacy Bowl was a post-season college football all-star game played on February 25, 2023, at Yulman Stadium in New Orleans, Louisiana. It was the second edition of the HBCU Legacy Bowl and was the last of the all-star games that concluded the 2022–23 bowl games.

The bowl's teams are named after Jake Gaither, coach of the Florida A&M Rattlers from 1945 to 1973, and Eddie Robinson, coach of the Grambling State Tigers from 1941 to 1997.

Each team was led by co-head coaches: Chennis Berry of Benedict College and Eric Dooley of Southern University for Team Robinson, and Richard Hayes Jr. of Fayetteville State University and Trei Oliver of North Carolina Central University for Team Gaither.

On October 13, 2022, Mark Evans II, an offensive lineman for the Arkansas–Pine Bluff Golden Lions football team, was announced as the first player selected to the game.

== Box score ==
2023 HBCU Legacy Bowl

Quarter	1	2	3	4	Total
Team Gaither	0	3	0	0	3
Team Robinson	3	0	7	0	10

at Yulman Stadium • New Orleans

- Date: Saturday, February 25, 2023
- Game time: 4:00 p.m. EST
- Game attendance: 25,900
- TV: NFL Network
- Box score

Game information

First quarter

- (0:04) ROB – Jose Romo-Martinez 42-yard field goal. Robinson 3–0

Second quarter

- (0:02) GAIT – Elton Andrew 31-yard field goal. Tied 3–3

Third quarter

- (5:30) ROB – Xavier Smith 22-yard pass from Larry Harrington (Jose Romo-Martinez kick). Robinson 10–3

Fourth quarter

- No scoring

Statistics	Gaither	Robinson
First downs	11	10
Plays–yards	49–196	47–190
Rushes–yards	26–61	20–6
Passing yards	135	184
Passing: comp–att–int	15–23–0	20–27–0
Time of possession	31:15	28:45

Team	Category	Player	Statistics
Gaither	Passing	Jalen Fowler	12–13, 111 YDS
Gaither	Rushing	Alfonzo Graham	5 CAR, 21 YDS
Gaither	Receiving	Tyler Barnes	2 REC, 37 YDS
Robinson	Passing	Larry Harrington	9–15, 103 YDS, 1 TD
Robinson	Rushing	Que'shaun Byrd	1 CAR, 4 YDS
Robinson	Receiving	Xavier Smith	6 REC, 85 YDS, 1 TD

== See also ==
- Historically black colleges and universities § Intercollegiate sports
