= Mike Cerasuolo =

American football coach

Current position
- Title: Head coach
- Team: Springfield
- Conference: NEWMAC
- Record: 77–28

Biographical details
- Born: May 20, 1971 (age 55); Northborough, Massachusetts, U.S.

Playing career
- 1989–1992: Springfield
- Position: Center

Coaching career (HC unless noted)
- 1993–1994: Ithaca (GA)
- 1995: Maine (OL/TE)
- 1996: Cortland (OC)
- 1997: Lebanon Valley (OC)
- 1998–1999: Alfred (OC)
- 2000: Mansfield (OC)
- 2001–2015: Springfield (OC)
- 2016–present: Springfield

Head coaching record
- Overall: 77–28
- Bowls: 1–0
- Tournaments: 4–6 (NCAA D-III playoffs)

Accomplishments and honors

Championships
- 6 NEWMAC (2017, 2021–2025)

Awards
- 4× NEWMAC Coach of the Year (2017, 2021–2023)

Mike Cerasuolo (born May 20, 1971) is an American college football coach. He is the head football coach for Springfield College, a position he has held since 2016. Cerasuolo was a standout offensive lineman at Springfield from 1989 to 1992, before going into coaching, starting as a graduate assistant at Ithaca. Cerasuolo would then become the offensive line and tight ends coach at Maine for a year, and then following that up with multiple offensive coordinator jobs at Cortland, Lebanon Valley, Alfred, and Mansfield spanning from 1996 until 2000. Following his lone season at Mansfield, Cerasuolo was hired as the offensive coordinator at Springfield under Mike DeLong, a position he held for 16 years, until DeLong's retirement, leading to Cerasuolo taking on the head job.

== Head coaching record ==
Year	Team	Overall	Conference	Standing	Bowl/playoffs	D3^{#}	AFCA^{°}
Springfield Pride (Liberty League) (2016)
2016	Springfield	5–5	4–3	T–3rd			
Springfield Pride (New England Women's and Men's Athletic Conference) (2017–present)
2017	Springfield	10–1	7–0	1st	L NCAA Division III First Round		
2018	Springfield	8–3	5–2	T–2nd	W New England		
2019	Springfield	6–4	5–2	T–3rd			
2020	No team—COVID-19						
2021	Springfield	7–4	6–0	1st	L NCAA Division III First Round		
2022	Springfield	9–3	6–0	1st	L NCAA Division III Second Round	25	
2023	Springfield	9–3	7–0	1st	L NCAA Division III First Round		
2024	Springfield	12–1	7–0	1st	L NCAA Division III Quarterfinal		20
2025	Springfield	9–3	7–0	1st	L NCAA Division III Second Round		
2026	Springfield	2–1	0–0				
Springfield:		77–28	54–7				
Total:		77–28					
National championship Conference title Conference division title or championship game berth
