= Boomer Roepke =

American football coach (born 1989)

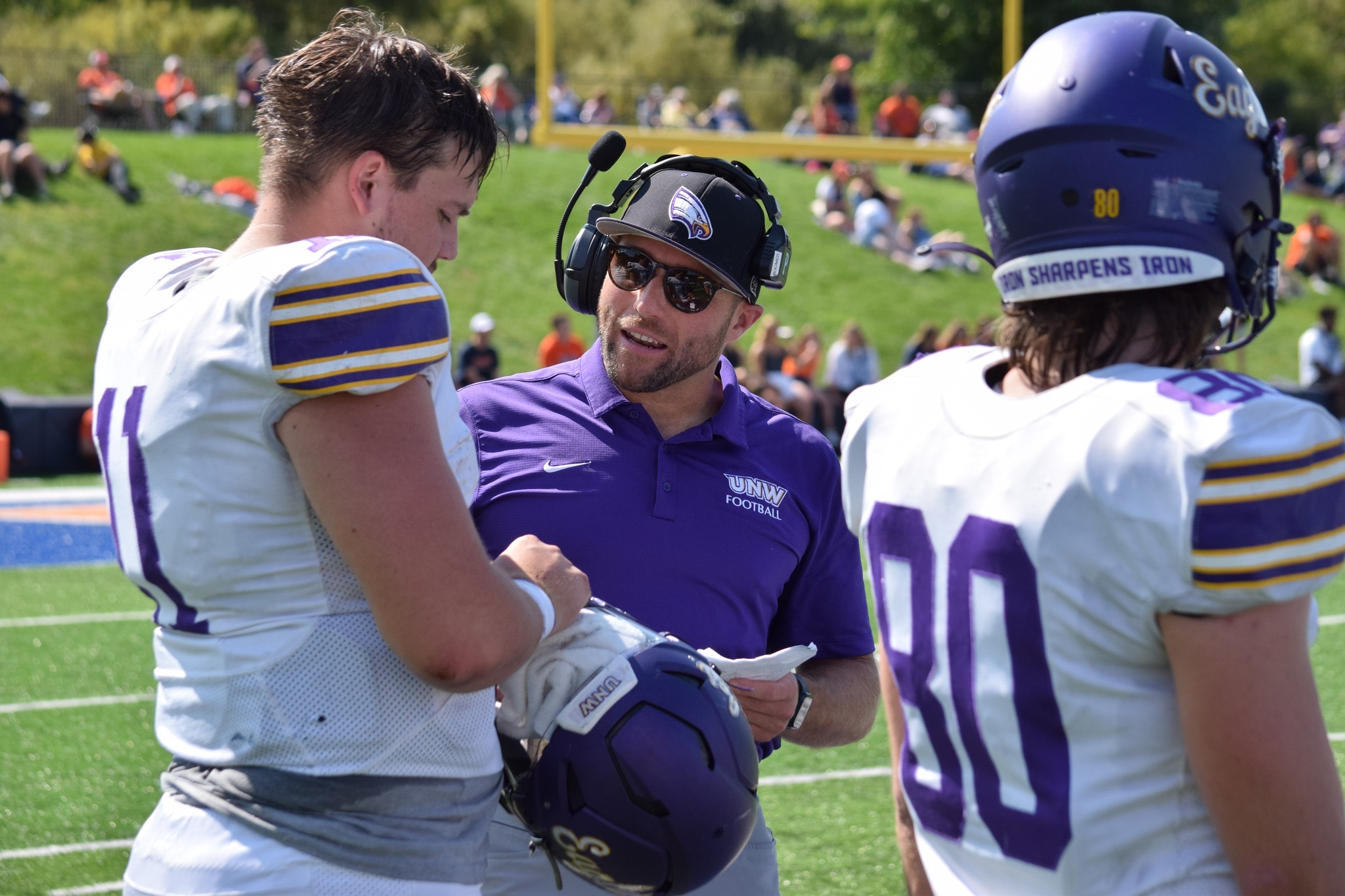
Roepke at a 2024 UNW Football Game

Peter Hague "Boomer" Roepke II (born August 11, 1989) is an American college football coach currently serving as the Offensive Coordinator and Quarterbacks Coach at Northern Michigan University. Previously, he was the Interim Head Coach, Offensive Coordinator, Offensive Line Coach and Director of Football Operations at Concordia University, St. Paul, a role he assumed in February 2025 and held through the 2025 season. Before that, he was the Associate Head Coach, Offensive Coordinator, and Quarterbacks Coach at the University of Northwestern – St. Paul (MN) from 2020 to 2025. Roepke's coaching career includes experience as a Graduate Assistant working with quarterbacks and special teams at Iowa State, a Graduate Student Coach at the University of Southern California (USC), and an Assistant Coach at Pasadena City College.

Roepke attended high school at Reno High School in Reno, Nevada. He earned his undergraduate degree at Annenberg School of Communication at USC as well as his Masters in Business Administration with the Marshall School of Business at USC, where he was a member of both the football and swim teams.

== Early life and family ==
Boomer Roepke was born into a Reno, Nevada, family with a strong athletic tradition. He is related to Carl Roepke, a National Champion in Luge and a former member of the USA Luge National Team and current Olympic sports commentator. His father was a football player for University of Utah from 1953 to 1954; and his role as a halfback on the team helped to implement the infamous Shovel Pass to college football.

== Playing career ==
Boomer Roepke earned a Varsity letter playing collegiate football for the USC Trojans as a walk on Punter, Cornerback and Safety during the 2009, 2010 & 2011 seasons. This came after two years of competing for the USC Varsity swim team from the Fall of 2007 to the Spring of 2009. Coaches during Roepke's tenure on the USC football team included Pete Carroll, Ed Orgeron and Lane Kiffin. During his playing time at USC, Roepke is most notably remembered for his "Rudy" moment where he earned his first snap against Cal Berkeley.

== Coaching career ==
USC Trojans Football – Roepke began his coaching career at USC as a graduate student coach, assisting in the recruiting department as well as assisting the Wide Receivers coach, Tee Martin and Offensive Coordinator Clay Helton.

Pasadena City College – Roepke continued his coaching career at Pasadena City College in 2016 where he served as an assistant coach with the Wide Receivers.

Iowa State Cyclones – After receiving his MBA at USC, Boomer set out to meet with coaches and teams to learn their leadership strategies and schematic approaches. He visited 74 Universities; From NFL, D1, D2, D3, Junior Colleges and NAIA. One of these visits resulted in him meeting with Matt Campbell at Iowa State where he spent three years furthering his education while coaching special teams and eventually supporting the QB group. While working as a Quarterbacks coach at Iowa State Boomer supported recruiting and coaching the current 49ers quarterback Brock Purdy.

University of Northwestern – St. Paul – From 2020 to 2024, Roepke served as the Offensive Coordinator, Associate Head Coach, and Quarterbacks Coach at UNW. Under his leadership, the team won UMAC Conference Championships in 2022 and 2024.

Concordia University, St. Paul – In February 2025, Roepke was hired as the Offensive Coordinator, Director of Football Operations and Offensive Line coach at Concordia University, St Paul.

Northern Michigan University – In January 2026, Roepke continued his coaching career, becoming the Offensive Coordinator and Quarterbacks coach at Northern Michigan University.

== In the news ==
Boomer Roepke's playing & coaching journey, from USC to leading a championship-winning program, was most recently highlighted in a Star Tribune article in 2023.
