= HBCU Legacy Bowl =

College football all-star bowl game

- Allstate HBCU Legacy Bowl
- Stadium: Yulman Stadium
- Location: New Orleans, Louisiana
- Operated: 2022–present
- Website: hbculegacybowl.com

Sponsors
- Allstate (2024–present)

2025 matchup
- Gaither vs. Robinson (Robinson 17–14)

2026 matchup
- Gaither vs. Robinson (Gaither 27–23)

The HBCU Legacy Bowl is an annual post-season American college football all-star game for NFL draft-eligible players from historically black colleges and universities (HBCU). (Note: Most, although not all, HBCU football programs compete in the Mid-Eastern Athletic Conference (MEAC) or the Southwestern Athletic Conference (SWAC), which are part of the NCAA Division I Football Championship Subdivision (FCS).) It is the overall concluding game of the college football post-season.

== History ==
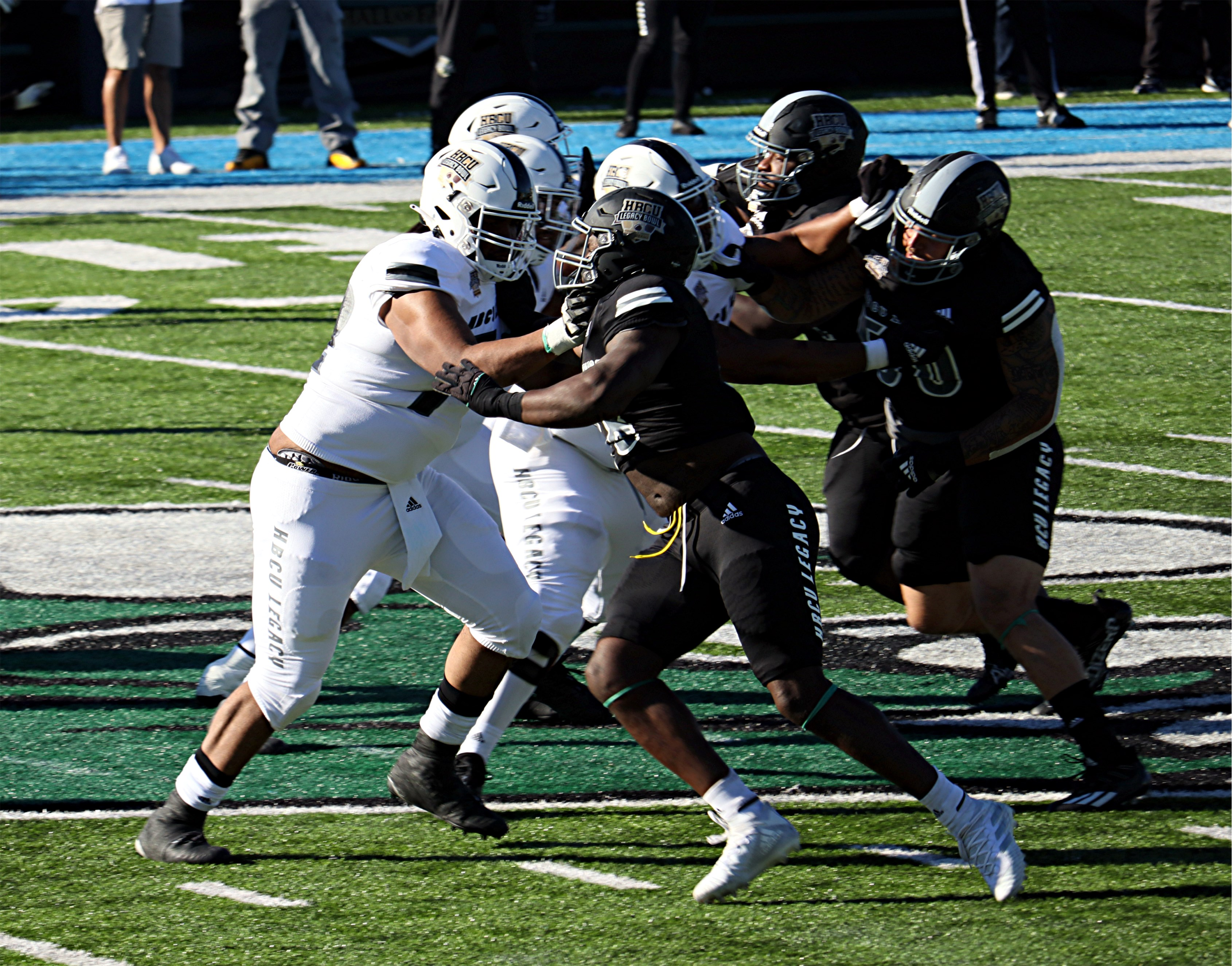
Action during the February 2022 game

The event was announced by the Black College Football Hall of Fame on March 18, 2021. The game was founded by the Black College Football Hall of Fame, National Football League (NFL), Pro Football Hall of Fame, and Tulane University. The inaugural bowl was contested on February 19, 2022, at Yulman Stadium on the campus of Tulane University in New Orleans; it was broadcast on NFL Network.

Since February 2023, the bowl has also hosted the NFL's HBCU Combine, which was first held at the 2022 Senior Bowl.

In June 2023, organizers announced a multi-year partnership with Allstate, making the company the exclusive title sponsor of the Allstate HBCU Legacy Bowl.

== Game results ==
The bowl's teams are named after Jake Gaither, coach of the Florida A&M Rattlers from 1945 to 1973, and Eddie Robinson, coach of the Grambling State Tigers from 1941 to 1997.

Date	Winning Team		Losing Team		Attendance	Notes
February 19, 2022	Team Gaither	22	Team Robinson	6	5,000	notes
February 25, 2023	Team Robinson	10	Team Gaither	3	25,900	notes
February 24, 2024	Team Gaither	10	Team Robinson	6	25,900	
February 22, 2025	Team Robinson	17	Team Gaither	14	25,900	
February 21, 2026	Team Gaither	27	Team Robinson	23	25,900	

== MVPs ==
Year	Offensive			Defensive			Ref.
Year	Name	Pos.	College team	Name	Pos.	College team	Ref.
2022	Geremy Hickbottom	QB	Tennessee State	Antwan Collier	DB	Florida A&M	
2023	Xavier Smith	WR	Florida A&M	Jason Dumas	DL	Southern	
2024	Davius Richard	QB	North Carolina Central	Zareon Hayes	DE	Alabama A&M	
2025	Daniel Richardson	QB	Florida A&M	Trequan Thomas	DL	Alabama State	
2026	JaQuan Kelly	RB	Winston-Salem State	Michael Lunz II	DE	South Carolina State	

== See also ==
- Celebration Bowl – the de facto black college football national championship
