= Ralph Micheli =

American football coach

Playing career
- 1967–1969: Macalester

Coaching career (HC unless noted)
- 1970: Bishop Noll HS (IN) (freshmen)
- 1971: Elston HS (IN) (line)
- 1972–1973: Lincoln HS (IN)
- 1974–1975: Arkansas (GA)
- 1976–1977: Sul Ross (assistant)
- 1978–1980: Tarkio
- 1985–1991: Sul Ross
- 1992: Moorhead State (OL)
- 1993–2004: Moorhead State / Minnesota State–Moorhead

Head coaching record
- Overall: 85–131–4 (college); 6–12 (high school)

Accomplishments and honors

Championships
- 1 TIAA (1985); 1 NSIC (1995)

Awards
- NSIC Coach of the Year (1994)

Ralph Micheli is an American former football coach. He served as the head football coach at Tarkio College in Tarkio, Missouri from 1978 to 1980, Sul Ross State University in Alpine, Texas from 1985 to 1981, and Minnesota State University Moorhead from 1993 to 2004, compiling a career college football coaching record of 85–131–4. Micheli played college football at Macalester College.

== Head coaching record ==
=== College ===
Year	Team	Overall	Conference	Standing	Bowl/playoffs
Tarkio Owls (Heart of America Athletic Conference) (1978–1980)
1978	Tarkio	3–7	0–6	7th	
1979	Tarkio	0–9	0–6	7th	
1980	Tarkio	0–10	0–8	9th	
Tarkio:		3–26	0–20		
Sul Ross Lobos (Texas Intercollegiate Athletic Association) (1985–1991)
1985	Sul Ross	5–5	4–2	T–1st	
1986	Sul Ross	3–6	2–4	T–2nd	
1987	Sul Ross	5–2–2	2–2–2	2nd	
1988	Sul Ross	5–5	5–5	3rd	
1989	Sul Ross	3–7	3–7	4th	
1990	Sul Ross	3–6	2–4	T–5th	
1991	Sul Ross	1–7	1–4	5th	
Sul Ross:		25–38–2	19–28–2		
Moorhead State / Minnesota State–Moorhead Dragons (Northern Sun Intercollegiate Conference) (1993–2004)
1993	Moorhead State	6–4	4–2	T–2nd	
1994	Moorhead State	7–3–1	4–1–1	2nd	
1995	Moorhead State	6–3–1	5–0–1	T–1st	
1996	Moorhead State	7–3	5–1	2nd	
1997	Moorhead State	5–5	3–3	T–3rd	
1998	Moorhead State	3–7	1–5	6th	
1999	Moorhead State	7–4	5–3	T–4th	
2000	Moorhead State	3–8	2–6	8th	
2001	Minnesota State–Moorhead	4–6	4–5	T–5th	
2002	Minnesota State–Moorhead	5–5	4–5	T–5th	
2003	Minnesota State–Moorhead	3–8	2–6	T–6th	
2004	Minnesota State–Moorhead	0–11	0–7	8th	
Moorhead State / Minnesota State–Moorhead:		57–67–2	39–44–2		
Total:		85–131–4			
National championship Conference title Conference division title or championship game berth
