= Ron Hudson (American football coach, born 1964) =

American football coach (born 1964)

Current position
- Title: Offensive line coach
- Team: Southern Utah
- Conference: Big Sky

Biographical details
- Born: November 5, 1964 (age 61); Columbus, Ohio, U.S.
- Education: Muskingum College (1987); University of Louisville (1992)

Playing career
- 1983–1986: Muskingum
- Position: Center

Coaching career (HC unless noted)
- 1991–1992: Louisville (GA)
- 1993: Illinois State (TE)
- 1994: Urbana (OC)
- 1995: The Citadel (TE)
- 1996: Lenoir–Rhyne (OL)
- 1997: Kent State (ST/OL)
- 1998–1999: Southeast Missouri State (OL)
- 2000: Bowling Green (OL)
- 2001–2002: UTEP (TE)
- 2003: UTEP (DE)
- 2004: Texas A&M–Kingsville (OL)
- 2005–2010: Louisiana–Lafayette (AHC/OL)
- 2011: New Mexico (OL)
- 2012: UMass (OL)
- 2013–2015: Nevada (OL)
- 2016: Penn State (OA)
- 2017: Charleston Southern (OL)
- 2018–2020: Georgia Southern (OL)
- 2021: New Mexico Highlands (AHC/ST)
- 2022–2023: New Mexico Highlands
- 2025: Utah Tech (OL)
- 2026–present: Southern Utah (OL)

Head coaching record
- Overall: 5–16

Ron Hudson (born November 5, 1964) is an American college football coach. He is the offensive line coach for Southern Utah University, a position he has held since 2026. He was the head football coach for New Mexico Highlands University from 2022 to 2023. He previously coached for Louisville, Illinois State, Urbana, The Citadel, Lenoir–Rhyne, Kent State, Southeast Missouri State, Bowling Green, UTEP, Texas A&M–Kingsville, Louisiana–Lafayette, New Mexico, UMass, Nevada, Penn State, Charleston Southern, and Georgia Southern. He played college football for Muskingum as a center.

== Head coaching record ==
Year	Team	Overall	Conference	Standing	Bowl/playoffs
New Mexico Highlands Cowboys (Rocky Mountain Athletic Conference) (2022–2023)
2022	New Mexico Highlands	3–7	3–6	T–6th	
2023	New Mexico Highlands	2–9	1–8	9th	
New Mexico Highlands:		5–16	4–14		
Total:		5–16			
