= Mark Evans II =

American gridiron football player (born 1999)

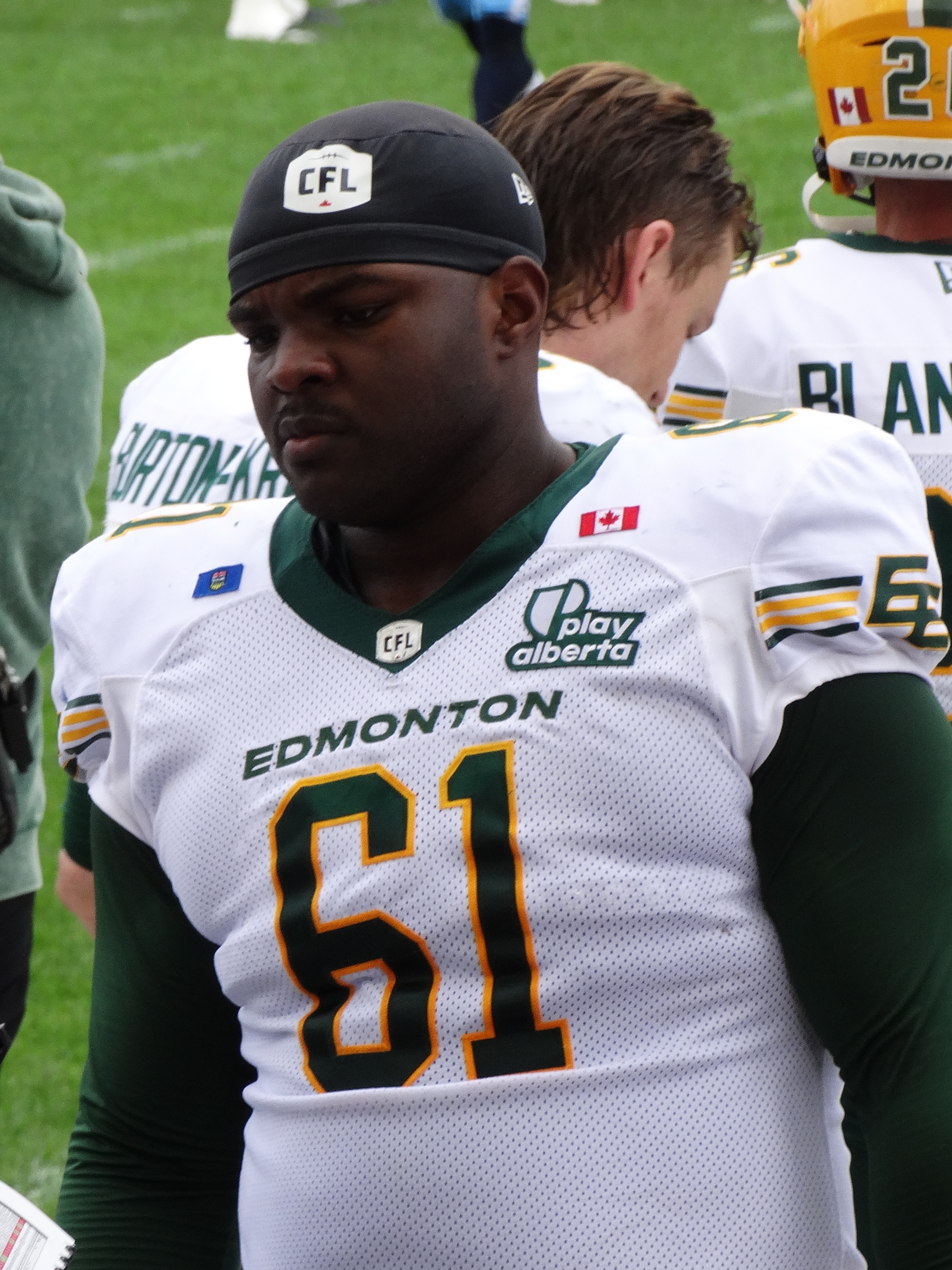
- Evans with the Edmonton Elks in 2025

Profile
- Position: Offensive tackle

Personal information
- Born: October 11, 1999 (age 27); St. Louis, Missouri, U.S.
- Listed height: 6 ft 4 in (1.93 m)
- Listed weight: 295 lb (134 kg)

Career information
- High school: C.E. King (Houston, Texas)
- College: Arkansas–Pine Bluff (2018–2022)
- NFL draft: 2023: undrafted

Career history
- New Orleans Saints (2023–2024)*; Arlington Renegades (2025)*; Edmonton Elks (2025)
- * Offseason or practice squad member only

Awards and highlights
- 4× First-team All-SWAC (2019, 2020, 2021, 2022); Phil Steele FCS Offensive Lineman of the Year Award (2022); Willie Roaf Award (2021)
- Stats at Pro Football Reference
- Stats at CFL.ca

Mark Evans II (born October 11, 1999) is an American professional football offensive tackle. He played college football for Arkansas–Pine Bluff.

== Early life ==
Evans was not allowed to play football growing up due to weight restrictions, so he did not begin playing until the seventh grade. Instead, he began boxing until he was able to start playing football.

Evans initially committed to play football at Navarro College, though later was recruited to play at the University of Arkansas at Pine Bluff.

== College career ==
Evans committed to play college football at Arkansas–Pine Bluff. As a freshman, he played in nine games, and during his sophomore season, he started in all eleven games at left tackle, contributing to an offensive line that allowed the second-lowest amount of sacks in the Southwestern Athletic Conference (SWAC). Although the 2020 season was postponed, Evans played with Arkansas–Pine Bluff at SWAC championship game against Alabama A&M in 2021. he played as a redshirt junior, where he allowed one sack and won the Willie Roaf Award, which honors Arkansas's top offensive linemen.

During his senior year, he started in nine games as part of an offensive line unit dubbed 'The Moving Crew' and only allowed two sacks.

Evans participated in the East-West Shrine Bowl, the HBCU Legacy Bowl, and the NFL Combine. He was the first Arkansas-Pine Bluff player to be invited to the combine since Terron Armstead in 2013.

== Professional career ==
Pre-draft measurables
Height	Weight	Arm length	Hand span	40-yard dash	10-yard split	20-yard split	20-yard shuttle	Three-cone drill	Vertical jump	Broad jump	Bench press
6 ft 2 1/2 in (1.89 m)	303 lb (137 kg)	32 3/8 in (0.82 m)	10 3/8 in (0.26 m)	5.44 s	1.90 s	3.06 s	4.77 s	7.71 s	26.5 in (0.67 m)	8 ft 6 in (2.59 m)	21 reps
All values from NFL Combine/Pro Day

=== New Orleans Saints ===
On April 30, 2023, Evans signed with the New Orleans Saints as an undrafted free agent. Evans was waived by the Saints on August 29, 2023. He signed to the Saints practice squad the next day. On September 4, 2023, Evans was waived before being re-signed to the practice squad on September 27. Following the end of the 2023 regular season, the Saints signed him to a reserve/future contract on January 8, 2024.

On July 28, 2024, Evans was waived by the Saints. However, following the release of Mason Fairchild on August 7, Evans was re–signed by New Orleans. He was waived on August 27.

=== Arlington Renegades ===
On January 29, 2025, Evans signed with the Arlington Renegades of the United Football League (UFL). He was released on March 20, 2025.

=== Edmonton Elks ===
On April 17, 2025, Evans signed with the Edmonton Elks of the Canadian Football League (CFL).

On May 31, 2026, Evans was released by the Elks as part of final roster cuts.

== Personal life ==
Evans has a younger brother, Jessie, who plays defensive line for the Ottawa Redblacks.

After Hurricane Harvey destroyed his family's home in 2017, he was temporarily homeless and eventually lived with four other people in a one-bedroom apartment during his senior year of high school.
