= Springfield Pride football =

Football team of Springfield College

- First season: 1890; 136 years ago
- Athletic director: Craig Poisson
- Head coach: Mike Cerasuolo; 9th season, 66–24 (.733)
- Location: Springfield, Massachusetts
- Stadium: Stagg Field (capacity: 3,867)
- NCAA division: Division III
- Conference: NEWMAC
- Colors: Maroon and white
- Bowl record: 6–0 (1.000)

Conference championships
- 8
- Fight song: Show Me the Scotsman

The Springfield Pride football program represents Springfield College in college football at the NCAA Division III level. The Pride have competed as members of the New England Women's and Men's Athletic Conference (NEWMAC) since 2017, when the conference began sponsoring football. Springfield plays its home games at the Stagg Field in Springfield, Massachusetts. Stagg Field opened in 1971 as Benedum Field, and was renamed in 2007 in honor of Amos Alonzo Stagg, who organized Springfield's football program in 1890, and served as the team's first head coach. Mike Cerasuolo is the Pride's current head coach, a role he has held since 2016, when he was promoted from long time offensive coordinator. Mike DeLong was the program's head coach from 1984 to 2015, compiling a record of 189–133–2. His 189 wins are the most of any head coach in program history.

Springfield's football program was a member of the Freedom Football Conference (FFC) from 1995 to 2003, the Empire 8 from 2004 to 2011, and the Liberty League from 2012 to 2016. The team has won eight conference championship titles, five in the FFC, in 1996, 1998, 2000, 2002 and 2003, and one in the Empire 8, in 2006, under head coach Mike Delong. The Pride have won two NEWMAC championships, in 2017 and 2021, under Cerasuolo. Springfield has appeared in the NCAA Division III Football Championship playoffs eleven times, in 1998, 2000, 2002, 2003, 2006, 2017, 2021, 2022, 2023, 2024 and 2025.

Springfield adopted the "Pride" nickname in 1996. The school's teams have previously been known as the Red and White, Gymnasts, Maroons, and Chiefs.

== Playoff appearances ==
The Pride have made twelve appearances in the NCAA Division III playoffs, with a combined record of 7–11.

=== NCAA Division III ===
| Year | Round | Opponent | Result |
|---|---|---|---|
| 1998 | First Round | Buffalo State | L, 35–38 |
| 2000 | First Round; Second Round; Quarterfinals | Montclair State; Brockport; Widener | W, 31–29; W, 13–6; L, 27–61 |
| 2002 | First Round | Brockport | L, 0–16 |
| 2003 | Second Round | RPI | L, 34–40 |
| 2006 | First Round; Second Round | Curry; St. John Fisher | W, 42–14; L, 21–27 |
| 2017 | First Round | Husson | L, 21–23 |
| 2021 | First Round | Cortland | L, 21–26 |
| 2022 | First Round; Second Round | Endicott; Ithaca | W, 17–14; L, 20–31 |
| 2023 | First Round | Ithaca | L, 7–21 |
| 2024 | Second Round; Third Round; Quarterfinals | UMass Dartmouth; Cortland; North Central (IL) | W, 54–27; W, 40–28; L, 3–27 |
| 2025 | First Round; Second Round | Cortland; Johns Hopkins | W, 21–7; L, 14–34 |
| 2026 | First Round | Wesleyan (CT) | TBP |
