= Jarrell Harrison =

American football coach (born 1987)

Current position
- Title: Running backs coach
- Team: Southern Utah
- Conference: Big Sky Conference

Biographical details
- Born: January 4, 1987 (age 39); Las Vegas, Nevada, U.S.
- Education: City College of San Francisco (2008); University of Missouri (2011); Adams State University (2018)

Playing career
- 2007–2008: CC of San Francisco
- 2009–2010: Missouri
- Position: Free safety

Coaching career (HC unless noted)
- 2014–2015: Las Vegas HS (NV) (DB)
- 2016–2017: Adams State (GA/RB)
- 2018–2020: Adams State (STC/DB/RC)
- 2021–2024: Adams State
- 2026–present: Southern Utah (RB)

Head coaching record
- Overall: 6–38

Jarrell Harrison (born January 4, 1987) is an American college football coach. He is currently the running backs coach for the Southern Utah Thunderbirds, a position he has held since 2026. He was the head football coach for Adams State University from 2021 to 2024. He previously coached for Las Vegas High School. He played college football for the City College of San Francisco and Missouri as a free safety.

== Head coaching record ==
Year	Team	Overall	Conference	Standing	Bowl/playoffs
Adams State Grizzlies (Rocky Mountain Athletic Conference) (2021–2024)
2021	Adams State	1–10	1–8	9th	
2022	Adams State	2–9	2–7	9th	
2023	Adams State	3–8	2–7	8th	
2024	Adams State	0–11	0–9	10th	
Adams State:		6–38	5–31		
Total:		6–38			
