= Maine Maritime Mariners football =

College football team

- First season: 1946
- Athletic director: Bill Mottola
- Head coach: Nick Sheehan; 1st season, 0–10 (.000)
- Location: Castine, Maine
- Stadium: Ritchie Field (capacity: 1,500)
- NCAA division: Division III
- Conference: CNE
- Colors: Blue and gold
- All-time record: 294–329–9 (.472)

Conference championships
- 5 NEFC (1972, 1980, 1993–1994, 2009)

Division championships
- 1 NEFC Red Division (1998); 3 NEFC Bogan Division (2008–2010)
- Mascot: Mariners
- Website: marinersports.org

The Maine Maritime Mariners football team represents Maine Maritime Academy in college football at the NCAA Division III level. The Mariners are members of the Conference of New England (CNE), fielding its team in the CNE since 2025. The Mariners play their home games at Ritchie Field in Castine, Maine.

The team began play in 1946, operating until 2020 when it was suspended due to financial losses incurred during the COVID-19 pandemic. MMA revived the program in 2024 with a three-game schedule and two against non-varsity teams, which became a full slate in 2025.

== Conference affiliations ==
- Independent (1946–1964)
- New England Football Conference (1965–2016)
- New England Women's and Men's Athletic Conference (2017–2019)
- No team (2020–2023)
- Independent (2024)
- Conference of New England (2025–present)

== List of head coaches ==
=== Key ===
Key to symbols in coaches list
General		Overall		Conference		Postseason (Note: Although the first Rose Bowl Game was played in 1902, it has been continuously played since the 1916 game, and is recognized as the oldest bowl game by the NCAA. "—" indicates any season prior to 1916 when postseason games were not played.)	
No.	Order of coaches (Note: A running total of the number of head coaches, with coaches who served separate tenures being counted only once. Interim head coaches are represented with "Int" and are not counted in the running total. "—" indicates the team played but either without a coach or no coach is on record. "X" indicates an interim year without play.)	GC	Games coached	CW	Conference wins	PW	Postseason wins
DC	Division championships	OW	Overall wins	CL	Conference losses	PL	Postseason losses
CC	Conference championships	OL	Overall losses	CT	Conference ties	PT	Postseason ties
NC	National championships	OT	Overall ties (Note: Overtime rules in college football were introduced in 1996, making ties impossible in the period since.)	C%	Conference winning percentage		
†	Elected to the College Football Hall of Fame	O%	Overall winning percentage (Note: When computing the win–loss percentage, a tie counts as half a win and half a loss.)				

=== Coaches ===
List of head football coaches showing season(s) coached, overall records and conference records
No.	Name	Season(s)	GC	OW	OL	OT	O%	CW	CL	CT	C%
1	John Hoctor	1946–1956	81	48	30	3	0.611	–	–	–	–
2	Tom Morse	1957–1958	11	1	9	1	0.136	–	–	–	–
3	Dave Wiggins	1959–1964	45	33	11	1	0.744	–	–	–	–
4	Jim McCormick	1965–1967	22	14	8	0	0.636	–	–	–	–
5	Bill Mottola	1968–1978	89	35	52	2	0.404	19	28	1	0.406
6	Mike DeLong	1979–1980	18	12	6	0	0.667	12	6	0	0.667
7	Bruce Morse	1981–1986	56	26	28	2	0.482	24	27	2	0.472
8	John Huard	1987–1993	62	32	30	0	0.516	23	23	0	0.500
9	Mike Hodgson	1994–2000	67	31	36	0	0.463	29	21	0	0.580
10	Chris McKenney	2001–2019	179	62	117	0	0.346	46	82	0	0.359
11	Calvin Powell	2024	3	0	3	0	.000	–	–	–	–
Int.	Bill Mottola Jr.	2024	1	0	1	0	.000	–	–	–	–

== Year-by-year results ==
National champions	Conference champions	Bowl game berth	Playoff berth

Season	Year	Head coach	Association	Division	Conference	Record							Postseason	Final ranking
Season	Year	Head coach	Association	Division	Conference	Overall			Conference				Postseason	Final ranking
Season	Year	Head coach	Association	Division	Conference	Win	Loss	Tie	Finish	Win	Loss	Tie	Postseason	Final ranking
Maine Maritime Mariners
1946	1946	John Hoctor	NCAA	—	Independent	4	2	0					—	—
1947	1947	John Hoctor	NCAA	—	Independent	5	3	0					—	—
1948	1948	John Hoctor	NCAA	—	Independent	6	1	0					—	—
1949	1949	John Hoctor	NCAA	—	Independent	5	1	2					—	—
1950	1950	John Hoctor	NCAA	—	Independent	4	4	0					—	—
1951	1951	John Hoctor	NCAA	—	Independent	4	2	0					—	—
1952	1952	John Hoctor	NCAA	—	Independent	7	2	0					—	—
1953	1953	John Hoctor	NCAA	—	Independent	3	5	0					—	—
1954	1954	John Hoctor	NCAA	—	Independent	3	4	0					—	—
1955	1955	John Hoctor	NCAA	—	Independent	4	2	1					—	—
1956	1956	John Hoctor	NCAA	College Division	Independent	3	4	0					—	—
1957	1957	Tom Morse	NCAA	College Division	Independent	1	4	0					—	—
1958	1958	Tom Morse	NCAA	College Division	Independent	0	5	1					—	—
1959	1959	Dave Wiggins	NCAA	College Division	Independent	5	3	0					—	—
1960	1960	Dave Wiggins	NCAA	College Division	Independent	7	1	0					—	—
1961	1961	Dave Wiggins	NCAA	College Division	Independent	6	2	0					—	—
1962	1962	Dave Wiggins	NCAA	College Division	Independent	5	3	0					—	—
1963	1963	Dave Wiggins	NCAA	College Division	Independent	5	1	1					—	—
1964	1964	Dave Wiggins	NCAA	College Division	Independent	5	1	0					—	—
1965	1965	Jim McCormick	NCAA	College Division	NEFC	3	4	0					—	—
1966	1966	Jim McCormick	NCAA	College Division	NEFC	6	2	0					—	—
1967	1967	Jim McCormick	NCAA	College Division	NEFC	5	2	0					—	—
1968	1968	Bill Mottola	NCAA	College Division	NEFC	4	2	1					—	—
1969	1969	Bill Mottola	NCAA	College Division	NEFC	2	5	0					—	—
1970	1970	Bill Mottola	NCAA	College Division	NEFC	3	5	0					—	—
1971	1971	Bill Mottola	NCAA	College Division	NEFC	3	6	0					—	—
1972	1972	Bill Mottola	NCAA	College Division	NEFC	5	3	0	1st	3	1	0	Conference champions	—
1973	1973	Bill Mottola	NCAA	Division III	NEFC	4	5	0	5th	2	3	0	—	—
1974	1974	Bill Mottola	NCAA	Division III	NEFC	1	8	0	8th	1	7	0	—	—
1975	1975	Bill Mottola	NCAA	Division III	NEFC	4	4	0	6th	4	3	0	—	—
1976	1976	Bill Mottola	NCAA	Division III	NEFC	4	4	0	T–5th	4	4	0	—	—
1977	1977	Bill Mottola	NCAA	Division III	NEFC	5	3	0	T–2nd	5	3	0	—	—
1978	1978	Bill Mottola	NCAA	Division III	NEFC	0	7	1	9th	0	7	1	—	—
1979	1979	Mike DeLong	NCAA	Division III	NEFC	4	5	0	T–5th	4	5	0	—	—
1980	1980	Mike DeLong	NCAA	Division III	NEFC	8	1	0	1st	8	1	0	Conference champions	—
1981	1981	Bruce Morse	NCAA	Division III	NEFC	7	2	0	2nd	7	2	0	—	—
1982	1982	Bruce Morse	NCAA	Division III	NEFC	7	2	1	3rd	6	2	1	—	—
1983	1983	Bruce Morse	NCAA	Division III	NEFC	3	6	0	T–7th	3	6	0	—	—
1984	1984	Bruce Morse	NCAA	Division III	NEFC	4	5	1	6th	3	5	1	—	—
1985	1985	Bruce Morse	NCAA	Division III	NEFC	4	4	0	T–4th	4	4	0	—	—
1986	1986	Bruce Morse	NCAA	Division III	NEFC	1	9	0	10th	1	8	0	—	—
1987	1987	John Huard	NCAA	Division III	NEFC	0	8	0	6th (North)	0	5	0	—	—
1988	1988	John Huard	NCAA	Division III	NEFC	2	7	0	7th (North)	0	6	0	—	—
1989	1989	John Huard	NCAA	Division III	NEFC	5	4	0	5th (North)	5	4	0	—	—
1990	1990	John Huard	NCAA	Division III	NEFC	5	4	0	3rd (North)	3	2	0	—	—
1991	1991	John Huard	NCAA	Division III	NEFC	5	3	0	T–2nd (North)	3	2	0	—	—
1992	1992	John Huard	NCAA	Division III	NEFC	6	3	0	T–3rd	5	3	0	—	—
1993	1993	John Huard	NCAA	Division III	NEFC	9	1	0	1st	7	1	0	Conference champions	—
1994	1994	Mike Hodgson	NCAA	Division III	NEFC	7	3	0	T–1st	7	1	0	Conference co-champions	—
1995	1995	Mike Hodgson	NCAA	Division III	NEFC	7	2	0	T–2nd	6	2	0	—	—
1996	1996	Mike Hodgson	NCAA	Division III	NEFC	5	5	0	T–3rd	5	3	0	—	—
1997	1997	Mike Hodgson	NCAA	Division III	NEFC	4	6	0	T–4th	4	4	0	—	—
1998	1998	Mike Hodgson	NCAA	Division III	NEFC	5	5	0	T–1st (Red)	5	1	0	Division co-champions	—
1999	1999	Mike Hodgson	NCAA	Division III	NEFC	3	6	0	5th (Red)	2	4	0	—	—
2000	2000	Mike Hodgson	NCAA	Division III	NEFC	0	9	0	7th (Bogan)	0	6	0	—	—
2001	2001	Chris McKenney	NCAA	Division III	NEFC	2	7	0	T–4th (Bogan)	2	4	0	—	—
2002	2002	Chris McKenney	NCAA	Division III	NEFC	1	8	0	T–5th (Bogan)	1	5	0	—	—
2003	2003	Chris McKenney	NCAA	Division III	NEFC	1	8	0	6th (Bogan)	1	5	0	—	—
2004	2004	Chris McKenney	NCAA	Division III	NEFC	3	6	0	T–4th (Bogan)	3	3	0	—	—
2005	2005	Chris McKenney	NCAA	Division III	NEFC	7	3	0	3rd (Bogan)	4	2	0	—	—
2006	2006	Chris McKenney	NCAA	Division III	NEFC	6	3	0	T–3rd (Bogan)	5	2	0	—	—
2007	2007	Chris McKenney	NCAA	Division III	NEFC	5	4	0	T–3rd (Bogan)	4	3	0	—	—
2008	2008	Chris McKenney	NCAA	Division III	NEFC	7	4	0	T–1st (Bogan)	6	1	0	Division co-champions	—
2009	2009	Chris McKenney	NCAA	Division III	NEFC	9	2	0	1st (Bogan)	6	1	0	L NCAA Division III Second Round	—
2010	2010	Chris McKenney	NCAA	Division III	NEFC	8	3	0	T–1st (Bogan)	6	1	0	Division co-champions	—
2011	2011	Chris McKenney	NCAA	Division III	NEFC	4	5	0	T–6th (Bogan)	2	5	0	—	—
2012	2012	Chris McKenney	NCAA	Division III	NEFC	0	9	0	8th (Bogan)	0	7	0	—	—
2013	2013	Chris McKenney	NCAA	Division III	NEFC	1	8	0	7th	1	6	0	—	—
2014	2014	Chris McKenney	NCAA	Division III	NEFC	3	6	0	T–6th	2	5	0	—	—
2015	2015	Chris McKenney	NCAA	Division III	NEFC	3	6	0	T–6th	2	5	0	—	—
2016	2016	Chris McKenney	NCAA	Division III	NEFC	1	8	0	8th	0	7	0	—	—
2017	2017	Chris McKenney	NCAA	Division III	NEWMAC	1	8	0	T–6th	1	6	0	—	—
2018	2018	Chris McKenney	NCAA	Division III	NEWMAC	0	9	0	8th	0	7	0	—	—
2019	2019	Chris McKenney	NCAA	Division III	NEWMAC	0	10	0	8th	0	7	0	—	—
No team from 2020 to 2023
2024	2024	Calvin Powell	NCAA	Division III	Independent	0	2	0					—	—
2025	2025	Nick Sheehan	NCAA	Division III	CNE	0	10	0	8th	0	7	0	—	—
