= Steve Laqua =

American football coach (born c. 1978)

Current position
- Title: Head coach
- Team: Minnesota State–Moorhead
- Conference: NSIC
- Record: 79–86

Biographical details
- Born: c. 1978 (age 47–48); Cavalier, North Dakota, U.S.

Playing career
- 1997–2000: North Dakota State
- Position: Safety

Coaching career (HC unless noted)
- 2001: St. Olaf (OLB)
- 2002–2003: North Dakota State (GA)
- 2004: Minnesota Crookston (OC)
- 2005–2006: North Dakota State (RB/TE)
- 2007–2010: Shanley HS (ND)
- 2011–present: Minnesota State–Moorhead

Head coaching record
- Overall: 79–86 (college); 25–18 (high school)
- Bowls: 0–1

Accomplishments and honors

Awards
- NSIC Coach of the Year (2018)

Steve Laqua (born c. 1978) is an American college football coach. He is the head football coach for Minnesota State University Moorhead, a position he has held since 2011. He was the head coach for the Shanley High School football team from 2007 to 2010; winning back-to-back North Dakota Class AA state championships. He also coached for St. Olaf, North Dakota State, and Minnesota Crookston. He played college football for North Dakota State as safety.

== Head coaching record ==
=== College ===
Year	Team	Overall	Conference	Standing	Bowl/playoffs
Minnesota State–Moorhead Dragons (Northern Sun Intercollegiate Conference) (2011–present)
2011	Minnesota State–Moorhead	2–9	1–9 / 1–5	13th / 6th (North)	
2012	Minnesota State–Moorhead	1–10	1–10 / 1–6	16th / 8th (North)	
2013	Minnesota State–Moorhead	4–7	4–7 / 4–3	T–10th / T–4th (North)	
2014	Minnesota State–Moorhead	4–7	4–7 / 3–4	T–11th / 5th (North)	
2015	Minnesota State–Moorhead	6–5	6–5 / 3–4	T–7th / T–3rd (North)	
2016	Minnesota State–Moorhead	7–4	7–4 / 5–2	7th / 3rd (North)	
2017	Minnesota State–Moorhead	5–6	5–6 / 3–4	10th / 5th (North)	
2018	Minnesota State–Moorhead	8–4	8–3 / 6–1	T–3rd / 2nd (North)	L Mineral Water
2019	Minnesota State–Moorhead	6–5	6–5 / 5–2	T–7th / T–3rd (North)	
2020–21	No team—COVID-19				
2021	Minnesota State–Moorhead	5–6	5–6 / 3–3	9th / 4th (North)	
2022	Minnesota State–Moorhead	4–7	4–7 / 3–3	T–9th / 4th (North)	
2023	Minnesota State–Moorhead	7–4	6–4	6th	
2024	Minnesota State–Moorhead	6–5	6–4	T–5th	
2025	Minnesota State–Moorhead	8–3	7–3 / 4–2	T–3rd / T–2nd (North)	
2026	Minnesota State–Moorhead	6–4	5–4 / 4–2		
Minnesota State–Moorhead:		79–86	75–84		
Total:		79–86			

=== High school ===
Year	Team	Overall	Conference	Standing	Bowl/playoffs
Shanley Deacons (NDHSAA) (2007–2010)
2007	Shanley	1–8	1–6	T–5th	
2008	Shanley	2–8	1–5	T–5th	
2009	Shanley	10–2	6–1	2nd	
2010	Shanley	12–0	7–0	1st	
Shanley:		25–18	15–12		
Total:		25–18			
National championship Conference title Conference division title or championship game berth
