= Mike DeLong =

American football player and coach (born 1952)

Biographical details
- Born: June 10, 1952 (age 74)

Playing career
- 1971–1973: Springfield
- Position: Defensive lineman

Coaching career (HC unless noted)
- 1974–1976: Holland Patent HS (NY) (assistant)
- 1977: North Carolina (GA)
- 1978: Maine Maritime (DC)
- 1979–1980: Maine Maritime
- 1981–1983: Springfield (DC)
- 1984–2015: Springfield

Head coaching record
- Overall: 201–139–2
- Tournaments: 3–5 (NCAA D-III playoffs)

Accomplishments and honors

Championships
- 1 NEFC (1980); 5 FFC (1996, 1998, 2000, 2002–2003); 1 Empire 8 (2006)

Michael DeLong (born June 10, 1952) is an American former football player and coach. He served as the head football coach at Maine Maritime Academy from 1979 to 1980 and at Springfield College in Springfield, Massachusetts from 1984 to 2015, compiling a career college football coaching record of 201–139–2. DeLong played college football at Springfield as a defensive lineman in the early 1970s before graduating in 1974. He returned to his alma mater in 1981 as an assistant coach.

== Head coaching record ==
=== College ===
Year	Team	Overall	Conference	Standing	Bowl/playoffs	D3^{#}
Maine Maritime Mariners (New England Football Conference) (1979–1980)
1979	Maine Maritime	4–5	4–5	T–5th		
1980	Maine Maritime	8–1	8–1	1st		
Maine Maritime:		12–6	12–6			
Springfield Chiefs (NCAA Division II independent) (1984–1994)
1984	Springfield	3–7				
1985	Springfield	2–8				
1986	Springfield	4–5				
1987	Springfield	5–3–1				
1988	Springfield	6–3–1				
1989	Springfield	4–6				
1990	Springfield	6–4				
1991	Springfield	7–3				
1992	Springfield	3–6				
1993	Springfield	3–7				
1994	Springfield	5–5				
Springfield Chiefs / Pride (Freedom Football Conference) (1995–2003)
1995	Springfield	8–2	3–2	T–3rd	W ECAC Championship	
1996	Springfield	6–4	5–1	T–1st		
1997	Springfield	4–5	3–3	4th		
1998	Springfield	9–2	6–0	1st	L NCAA Division III First Round	
1999	Springfield	4–6	4–2	T–2nd		
2000	Springfield	11–2	6–0	1st	L NCAA Division III Quarterfinal	
2001	Springfield	4–5	3–3	T–3rd		
2002	Springfield	8–2	6–0	1st	L NCAA Division III First Round	
2003	Springfield	10–1	6–0	1st	L NCAA Division III Second Round	13
Springfield Pride (Empire 8) (2004–2011)
2004	Springfield	8–2	4–2	3rd	W ECAC North Atlantic Championship	
2005	Springfield	4–6	2–4	5th		
2006	Springfield	10–2	5–1	T–1st	L NCAA Division III Second Round	10
2007	Springfield	4–6	2–4	5th		
2008	Springfield	4–6	2–4	T–5th		
2009	Springfield	8–2	3–2	T–3rd	W ECAC Northeast Bowl	
2010	Springfield	9–2	3–2	T–2nd	W ECAC North Atlantic Bowl	
2011	Springfield	6–4	4–3	T–3rd		
Springfield Pride (Liberty League) (2012–2015)
2012	Springfield	8–3	5–2	3rd	W ECAC Championship Bowl	
2013	Springfield	7–3	3–3	T–3rd	W ECAC Championship Bowl	
2014	Springfield	5–5	3–4	T–4th		
2015	Springfield	4–6	2–5	T–6th		
Springfield:		189–133–2	80–47			
Total:		201–139–2				
National championship Conference title Conference division title or championship game berth
^{#}Rankings from D3football.com.

== See also ==
- List of college football career coaching wins leaders
