= Jas Bains =

American football coach (born c. 1981)

Current position
- Title: Head coach
- Team: Western Colorado
- Conference: RMAC
- Record: 75–86

Biographical details
- Born: c. 1981 (age 44–45); Fresno, California, U.S.
- Education: California State University, Fresno (2004); Chadron State College (2006)

Playing career
- 2000: Willamette
- 2001–2003: Fresno State
- Position: Defensive back

Coaching career (HC unless noted)
- 2004–2005: Chadron State (GA)
- 2006–2007: Chadron State (DB)
- 2008–2009: Chadron State (ST/DB)
- 2010: Western State (DC/ST)
- 2011–present: Western State / Western Colorado

Head coaching record
- Overall: 75–86
- Tournaments: 2–4 (NCAA D-II playoffs)

Accomplishments and honors

Championships
- 1 RMAC (2021)

Jas Bains (born c. 1981) is an American college football coach. He is the head football coach for Western Colorado University, a position he has held since 2011. He also coached for Chadron State. He played college football for Willamette and Fresno State as a defensive back.

== Head coaching record ==
Year	Team	Overall	Conference	Standing	Bowl/playoffs	AFCA^{#}	D2^{°}
Western State / Western Colorado Mountaineers (Rocky Mountain Athletic Conference) (2011–present)
2011	Western State	1–10	1–8	10th			
2012	Western State	1–10	1–8	9th			
2013	Western State	2–9	2–7	9th			
2014	Western State	4–7	3–6	T–6th			
2015	Western State	4–7	4–5	T–5th			
2016	Western State	7–4	7–3	4th			
2017	Western State	1–10	1–9	T–10th			
2018	Western Colorado	2–9	2–8	T–9th			
2019	Western Colorado	5–6	5–5	T–5th			
2020–21	Western Colorado	0–1	0–0	N/A			
2021	Western Colorado	10–2	8–1	T–1st	L NCAA Division II First Round	16	
2022	Western Colorado	7–4	7–2	T–2nd			
2023	Western Colorado	10–2	8–1	2nd	L NCAA Division II First Round	15	16
2024	Western Colorado	11–2	8–1	2nd	L NCAA Division II Second Round	10	13
2025	Western Colorado	10–3	7–2	3rd	L NCAA Division II Second Round	12	11
2026	Western Colorado	0–0	0–0				
Western State / Western Colorado:		75–86	64–66				
Total:		75–86					
National championship Conference title Conference division title or championship game berth
