= John Hoctor =

American football player and coach (1916–2004)

Biographical details
- Born: April 15, 1916; Biddeford, Maine, U.S.
- Died: April 21, 2004 (aged 88); Bangor, Maine, U.S.

Playing career
- 1937–1940: Maine

Coaching career (HC unless noted)
- 1946–1956: Maine Maritime

Head coaching record
- Overall: 48–30–3

John M. Hoctor (April 15, 1916 – April 21, 2004) was an American football player and coach. He played college football at the University of Maine. He served as the head football coach at Maine Maritime Academy in Castine, Maine from 1946 to 1956. Hoctor was credited with starting the athletic program at Maine Maritime.

== Head coaching record ==
Year	Team	Overall	Conference	Standing	Bowl/playoffs
Maine Maritime Mariners (Independent) (1946–1956)
1946	Maine Maritime	4–2			
1947	Maine Maritime	5–3			
1948	Maine Maritime	6–1			
1949	Maine Maritime	5–1–2			
1950	Maine Maritime	4–4			
1951	Maine Maritime	4–2			
1952	Maine Maritime	7–2			
1953	Maine Maritime	3–5			
1954	Maine Maritime	3–4			
1955	Maine Maritime	4–2–1			
1956	Maine Maritime	3–4			
Maine Maritime:		48–30–3			
Total:		48–30–3			
