= Logan Masters =

American football coach (born c. 1987)

Current position
- Title: Head coach
- Team: Wayne State (NE)
- Conference: NSIC
- Record: 39–15

Biographical details
- Born: c. 1987 (age 38–39); Storm Lake, Iowa, U.S.
- Education: Wayne State College (2010)

Playing career
- 2006–2009: Wayne State (NE)
- Position: Wide receiver

Coaching career (HC unless noted)
- 2010: Wayne State (NE) (TE)
- 2011–2012: Wayne State (NE) (GA)
- 2013–2014: Wayne State (NE) (WR)
- 2015–2016: Wayne State (NE) (OC/QB)
- 2017–2018: Chadron State (WR)
- 2019: Chadron State (OC/QB)
- 2020–2021: Wayne State (NE) (OC/QB)
- 2022–present: Wayne State (NE)

Head coaching record
- Overall: 39–16
- Tournaments: 0–1 (NCAA D-II playoffs)

Accomplishments and honors

Championships
- 1 NSIC (2022); 2 NSIC South Division (2022, 2025)

Awards
- First Team All-NSIC (2009); Wayne State (NE) Hall of Fame (2021); NSIC Hall of Fame (2023)

Logan Masters (born c. 1987) is an American college football coach. He is the head football coach for Wayne State College, a position he has held since 2022. He also coached for Central Missouri and Chadron State. He played college football for Wayne State (NE) as a wide receiver.

== Head coaching record ==
Year	Team	Overall	Conference	Standing	Bowl/playoffs
Wayne State Wildcats (Northern Sun Intercollegiate Conference) (2022–present)
2022	Wayne State	9–3	9–2 / 4–2	T–1st / 3rd (South)	L NCAA Division II First Round
2023	Wayne State	8–3	7–3	5th	
2024	Wayne State	7–4	6–4	T–5th	
2025	Wayne State	7–4	7–3 / 5–1	T–1st (South)	
2026	Wayne State	8–3	7–3 / 4–2	(South)	
Wayne State:		39–17	36–15		
Total:		39–17			
National championship Conference title Conference division title or championship game berth
