= Minnesota State–Moorhead Dragons =

- University: Minnesota State University Moorhead
- NCAA: Division II
- Conference: Northern Sun Intercollegiate Conference
- Athletic director: Chad Markuson
- Location: Moorhead, Minnesota
- Varsity teams: 14
- Football stadium: SCHEELS Field at Alex Nemzek Stadium
- Basketball arena: Alex Nemzek Fieldhouse
- Soccer stadium: Alex Nemzek Soccer Field
- Other venues: Alex Nemzek Hall
- Nickname: Dragons
- Colors: Red and white
- Mascot: Scorch & Torch
- Fight song: We Are The Dragons
- Website: www.msumdragons.com
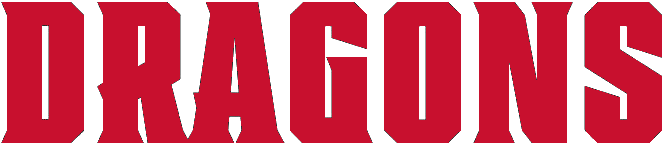

The Minnesota State–Moorhead Dragons (also MSU Moorhead Dragons, MSUM Dragons, and formerly Moorhead State Dragons) are the athletic teams that represent Minnesota State University Moorhead, located in Moorhead, Minnesota, in NCAA Division II intercollegiate sports. The Dragons generally compete as members of the Northern Sun Intercollegiate Conference for all 14 varsity sports.

== Varsity teams ==
Minnesota State University Moorhead plays in the Northern Sun Intercollegiate Conference as one of the charter members. The conference was founded as the Northern Teachers Athletic Conference in 1932, when MSUM was Moorhead State Teachers College. For decades, the NSIC competed in the National Association of Intercollegiate Athletics. In 1964, MSUM won the NAIA national championship in wrestling. The NSIC entered the National Collegiate Athletic Association in 1992 and by 1995 full members at the Division II level.

In total, the Dragons have won 101 conference championships, with 77 in men's sports and 24 in women's

Men's sports	Women's sports
Basketball	Basketball
Cross Country	Cross Country
Football	Dance
Track & field^{1}	Golf
Wrestling	Soccer
	Softball
	Swimming & Diving
	Tennis
	Track & field^{1}
	Volleyball
^{1} – includes both indoor and outdoor

=== Men's basketball ===
MSUM has won four division titles and six conference titles in the NSIC. The Dragons won conference titles in 1964–1965, 1970–1971, 1980–1981, 1981–1982, 2014–2015 and 2016–2017. The Dragons have also earned eight trips to the NSIC Tournament Final, winning the title in 2022, 2023 and 2025.

MSUM is coached by Jason Kemp, the 15th in the program’s history. Kemp was previously an assistant coach at the University of Minnesota. He also brought experience in assistant coaching roles at William & Mary, Ohio, Toledo and North Dakota State.

The Dragons’ previous coach was Tim Bergstraser, who took the helm in the 2022–2023 season. In that first year, Bergstraser’s team won the NSIC Tournament Championship and earned a national tournament berth. The following season, Bergstraser’s team earned a No. 1 ranking in the polls and later returned to the national tournament. After defeating Pittsburg State in the first round, they fell to the eventual national champions Minnesota State-Mankato.

In his final season with the program, Bergstraser led MSUM to the NCAA Division II Sweet 16, before taking the position of head coach of the men's basketball at the University of Denver.

Bergstraser’s predecessor was Chad Walthall, who led MSUM from 2010–2022. Walthall’s rebuild of MSUM’s basketball program took off in his second season, when he brought the team back to the post season for the first time since 1965 and the first 20 win season since 1982. In an exhibition game to start that second season, Walthall’s team earned a 90-84 win in double overtime against the Division I North Dakota State Bison, located in Moorhead’s neighboring city of Fargo.

In his tenure, Walthall’s Dragon teams reached the NCAA Division II Basketball Tournament six times, with the final berth in 2022 via the NSIC tournament title. Following the conclusion of the season, Walthall retired from the position in March 2022. The highlight of his tenure was the 2014–2015 season, when he led the team to a 35–4 record culminating in a deep run in the 2015 tournament. That season he was named conference, Central Region and National coach of the year.

=== Women's basketball ===
MSUM has earned six conference titles, with championship seasons in 1981–1982, 1984–1985, 2004–2005, 2016–2017, 2017–2018 and 2018–2019. The team has also won four division titles.

Current Head Coach Karla Nelson has been with MSUM since 2000. Nelson has led the Dragons on six trips to the NCAA Division II tournament. She's earned coach of the year honors from the NSIC four times.

=== Football ===
MSUM has 16 NSIC titles. They won the conference in 1932, 1934, 1935, 1947, 1952, 1966, 1971, 1973, 1979, 1981, 1982, 1984, 1988, 1989, 1991 and 1995.

Nine of those conference championships were won by MSUM’s winningest coach Ross Fortier, who helmed the program from 1970-1992. During his tenure, the Dragons went 152–80–4, earning 10 playoff berths. He was succeeded by Ralph Micheli who coached from 1993–2004, winning the NSIC in 1995.

Steve Laqua, the Dragons' 17th football coach, was hired in spring 2011 after helming the Fargo Shanley High School program. In 2015, after defeating Minnesota Crookston 59–21, the Dragons earned their first winning season since 2006 with a 6–5 record. The next year, Laqua's team increased its win total to 7–4. While the Dragons finished with a losing 5–6 record in 2017, the 18 wins over those three years were the most victories since the 1995–1997 seasons.

The 2018 campaign proved to be Laqua's best season so far with the Dragons, earning an 8–4 record and a trip to the Mineral Water Bowl. In the regular season finale, the Dragons defeated St. Cloud State University to earn their eighth win, their most victories since 1991. The Mineral Water Bowl, which the Dragons lost 51–16 to Missouri University of Science and Technology, was the first postseason game for MSUM since 1994.

After a 6–5 campaign in 2019 where they finished the season by defeating St. Cloud State University, the Dragons did not play in 2020 because of the coronavirus pandemic. In 2021, the team returned to action, finishing 5–6. The following season, MSUM would go 4–7, losing the finale against Wayne State College.

The team bounced back with a winning record in 2023, finishing 7–4. The 2023 campaign included the Dragons' first ever win against the University of Sioux Falls after losing the previous five games. They followed up with another winning season in 2024, finishing 6–5, including a victory of the University of Minnesota Duluth Bullodgs. It was their first victory against UMD since 1999.

In 2025, the Dragons reached its third consecutive winning season by finishing 8–3. It was the first time reaching at least three consecutive winning seasons since the 1990s. The season was highlighted by a season finale win against No. 14 Minnesota State-Mankato. It was the first victory over the Mavericks since 1981. The Dragons also defeated chief rival Bemidji State University for the first time since 2018. Despite the record, the Dragons narrowly missed the 2025 NCAA Division II football playoffs.

MSUM was led in the season by quarterback Jack Strand, who finished his career with 13,161 passing yards and 126 touchdowns. Because of his play, Strand was named NSIC Offensive Player of the Year, and ranks 10th all time in NCAA Division II career passing yards. Wideout Gage Florence, named NSIC first team, also set the NCAA Division II record for career receptions, finishing with 402. Following the season, Strand was invited to the American Bowl, while Florence was selected to attend the College Gridiron Showcase.

==== Rivalries ====
The Red River Valley Showdown vs the University of Minnesota Crookston Golden Eagles for the State Farm Traveling Trophy. MSUM leads the series 14–7. The series ended in 2020 when UMC cut its football program.

The Battle for the Paddle Trophy vs the University of Mary (Bismarck). MSUM leads the series 11–8. The Paddle was developed by the student governments, as both schools are located near a river. UMary is located on the Missouri River and MSUM is near the Red River.

The Battle for the Axe vs Bemidji State. MSUM leads 39–34–3 in the series for the trophy which dates back to 1948. The axe originated in the village of Mount Hagon, New Guinea. The series as a whole dates back to 1929, with MSUM holding a 48–40–3 series lead in total.

The Dragons also had a cross-town rivalry with Concordia College in Moorhead. Concordia leads the now defunct rivalry 49–25–12, winning the final game in a 34–32 thriller. Today Concordia plays at the NCAA Division III level in the Minnesota Intercollegiate Athletic Conference. The two schools still play in other sports, such as basketball.

== Non-varsity teams ==
MSUM has a wide variety of intramural sports including flag football, softball, and soccer. Club teams are also available for men's and women's rugby, men's and women's lacrosse, and baseball which compete nationally. MSU Moorhead also has a club ice hockey team, which began play in the 2018–2019 season. The team is part of the American Club Hockey Association, participating at the Division II level.

== Facilities ==
The Dragons football team plays at Alex Nemzek Stadium, a 6,000 seat facility. The stadium is named after the school's athletic director from 1923–1941. In 2015, the stadium received a renovation, with the added title of Scheels Field.

Nemzek's name is also on the 3,500 seat fieldhouse and basketball arena. In 2012, Nemzek Fieldhouse was renovated, with new sound systems, scoreboards and a 144-square foot video board installed. The next year, a new basketball court was installed in the arena.

The school's soccer and softball fields are also named after Nemzek.
