= Calvin Powell =

American football coach (born c. 1985)

Current position
- Title: Tight ends coach & fullbacks coach
- Team: Lincoln (MO)
- Conference: GLVC

Biographical details
- Born: Fort Worth, Texas, U.S.
- Education: Southwestern College (2008); Langston University (2013)

Playing career
- 2004: Hampton
- 2005–2007: Southwestern (KS)
- Position: Offensive lineman

Coaching career (HC unless noted)
- 2008–2009: Greenhill School (TX) (OC/OL)
- 2010: Northeastern Oklahoma A&M (RB/TE)
- 2011: Langston (GA)
- 2012: Langston (OL)
- 2013: St. Michael's Catholic Academy (TX) (OL)
- 2014: Maritime (RB)
- 2015: Temple (GA)
- 2016–2017: Texas Wesleyan (OC/QB/RB)
- 2018–2021: Lyon (OL)
- 2022: Langston (OL)
- 2023–2024: Maine Maritime
- 2025 (spring): Westminster (MO) (OL)
- 2025–present: Lincoln (MO) (TE/FB)

Head coaching record
- Overall: 0–2

Calvin Powell is an American college football coach. He is the tight ends coach and fullbacks coach for Lincoln University, positions he has held since 2025. He was the head football coach for Maine Maritime Academy from 2023 to 2024. He was the first head coach for the program as it restarted following the program being shut down following the 2019 season. He also coached for Greenhill School, Northeastern Oklahoma A&M, Langston, St. Michael's Catholic Academy, Maritime, Temple, Texas Wesleyan, Lyon, and Westminster (MO). He played college football for Hampton and Southwestern (KS) as an offensive lineman.

== Head coaching record ==
| Year | Team | Overall | Conference | Standing | Bowl/playoffs |
|---|---|---|---|---|---|
Maine Maritime Mariners (NCAA Division III independent) (2024)
| 2024 | Maine Maritime | 0–2 (Note: Powell resigned after two games and was replaced by Bill Mottola Jr. for the remainder of the season.) | | | |
| Maine Maritime: | | 0–2 | | | |
| Total: | | 0–2 | | | |
