= Arne Ferguson =

American football coach (born c. 1965)

Current position
- Title: Head coach
- Team: Western Oregon
- Conference: LSC
- Record: 109–96

Biographical details
- Born: c. 1965 (age 60–61); Vale, Oregon, U.S.
- Education: Western Oregon University (1989, 1991)

Playing career
- 1984–1988: Western Oregon
- Position: Linebacker

Coaching career (HC unless noted)
- 1989–1991: Western Oregon (GA)
- 1992: Silverton HS (OR) (assistant)
- 1993–1996: Western Oregon (LB/DB)
- 1997–2004: Western Oregon (DC)
- 2005–present: Western Oregon

Head coaching record
- Overall: 117–99
- Bowls: 1–0

Accomplishments and honors

Championships
- 1 GNAC (2019)

Awards
- 2× First Team All-CFL (1986–1987); Second Team All-CFL (1988); LSC Coach of the Year (2025)

Arne Ferguson (born c. 1965) is an American college football coach. He is the head football coach for Western Oregon University, a position he has held since 2005. He also coached for Silverton High School. He played college football for Western Oregon as a linebacker.

== Head coaching record ==
Year	Team	Overall	Conference	Standing	Bowl/playoffs
Western Oregon Wolves (Great Northwest Athletic Conference) (2005)
2005	Western Oregon	5–6	2–4	3rd	
Western Oregon Wolves (NCAA Division II independent) (2006–2007)
2006	Western Oregon	6–4			
2007	Western Oregon	9–2			W Dixie Rotary
Western Oregon Wolves (Great Northwest Athletic Conference) (2008–2021)
2008	Western Oregon	7–4	5–3	T–2nd	
2009	Western Oregon	5–5	3–3	2nd	
2010	Western Oregon	7–4	5–3	3rd	
2011	Western Oregon	6–5	6–2	2nd	
2012	Western Oregon	6–5	6–4	T–2nd	
2013	Western Oregon	7–4	7–3	T–2nd	
2014	Western Oregon	6–5	4–2	T–2nd	
2015	Western Oregon	7–4	5–1	2nd	
2016	Western Oregon	4–6	3–5	T–3rd	
2017	Western Oregon	3–8	2–6	4th	
2018	Western Oregon	5–6	4–4	3rd	
2019	Western Oregon	7–4	5–1	T–1st	
2020–21	No team—COVID-19				
2021	Western Oregon	4–6	2–2	2nd	
Western Oregon Wolves (Lone Star Conference) (2022–present)
2022	Western Oregon	6–5	5–4	T–3rd	
2023	Western Oregon	3–8	2–6	T–6th	
2024	Western Oregon	6–5	6–3	T–3rd	
2025	Western Oregon	8–3	7–2	T–2nd	
Western Oregon:		117–99	79–58		
Total:		117–99			
National championship Conference title Conference division title or championship game berth
