= Adam Schultz (American football) =

American football coach (born c. 1983)

Current position
- Title: Head coach
- Team: Post
- Conference: NE-10
- Record: 6–33

Biographical details
- Born: c. 1983 (age 42–43); Naugatuck, Connecticut, U.S.

Coaching career (HC unless noted)
- 2004–2011: Woodland Regional HS (CT) (DC/ST/DB/RB)
- 2012–2017: New Haven (RB)
- 2018–2019: Post (OC)
- 2020–present: Post

Head coaching record
- Overall: 6–33

Adam Schultz (born c. 1983) is an American college football coach. He is the head football coach for Post University, a position he has held since 2020. He also coached for Woodland Regional High School and New Haven.

== Head coaching record ==
Year	Team	Overall	Conference	Standing	Bowl/playoffs
Post Eagles (NCAA Division II independent) (2022–2023)
2022	Post	0–10			
2023	Post	1–8			
Post Eagles (Northeast-10 Conference) (2024–present)
2024	Post	1–9	0–8	9th	
2025	Post	4–6	1–6	7th	
Post:		6–33	1–14		
Total:		6–33			
