= Richard Hayes Jr. =

American football player and coach

Current position
- Title: Head coach
- Team: Fayetteville State
- Conference: CIAA
- Record: 59–33

Playing career
- 1991–1992: North Carolina A&T
- Position: Defensive back

Coaching career (HC unless noted)
- 1998–2002: North Carolina A&T (RB/OLB)
- 2004–2005: James B. Dudley HS (NC) (DC)
- 2009: W. J. Keenan HS (SC) (DC)
- 2010–2013: Winston-Salem State (DB/ST)
- 2014–2015: Winston-Salem State (DC)
- 2016–present: Fayetteville State

Head coaching record
- Overall: 59–33
- Tournaments: 0–1 (NCAA D-II playoffs)

Accomplishments and honors

Championships
- 1 CIAA (2022); 6 CIAA Southern Division (2017–2019, 2021–2023)

Awards
- CIAA Coach of the Year (2018)

Richard L. Hayes Jr. is an American college football coach. He is the head football coach for Fayetteville State University, a position he has held since 2016.

Hayes is the nephew of Bill Hayes, former football coach and college athletics administrator.

== Head coaching record ==
Year	Team	Overall	Conference	Standing	Bowl/playoffs
Fayetteville State Broncos (Central Intercollegiate Athletic Association) (2016–present)
2016	Fayetteville State	4–6	4–3	2nd (Southern)	
2017	Fayetteville State	6–5	5–2	T–1st (Southern)	
2018	Fayetteville State	6–3	5–1	1st (Southern)	
2019	Fayetteville State	8–3	6–1	1st (Southern)	
2020–21	No team—COVID-19				
2021	Fayetteville State	8–2	7–0	1st (Southern)	
2022	Fayetteville State	9–3	7–1	1st (Southern)	L NCAA Division II First Round
2023	Fayetteville State	8–2	8–0	1st (Southern)	
2024	Fayetteville State	4–5	3–4	T–7th	
2025	Fayetteville State	6–4	6–1	T–2nd	
Fayetteville State:		59–33	51–13		
Total:		59–33			
National championship Conference title Conference division title or championship game berth
