= Miles Kochevar =

American football coach (born c. 1983)

Current position
- Title: Head coach
- Team: Colorado Mesa
- Conference: RMAC
- Record: 23–20

Biographical details
- Born: c. 1983 (age 42–43); Fruita, Colorado, U.S.
- Education: Colorado State University (2006)

Playing career
- 2002–2005: Colorado State
- Position: Defensive back

Coaching career (HC unless noted)
- 2007–2008: Colorado Mesa (DB)
- 2009–2011: Colorado Mesa (ST/DB)
- 2012–2014: Colorado State (GA)
- 2015–2016: Humboldt State (DC/S)
- 2017–2018: West Texas A&M (DC)
- 2019: Northern Colorado (DB)
- 2020–2021: CSU Pueblo (DC/DB)
- 2022–present: Colorado Mesa

Head coaching record
- Overall: 23–20

Miles Kochevar (born c. 1983) is an American college football coach. He is the head football coach for Colorado Mesa University, a position he has held since 2022. He previously coached for Colorado State, Humboldt State, West Texas A&M, Northern Colorado, and CSU Pueblo. He played college football for Colorado State as a defensive back.

== Head coaching record ==
Year	Team	Overall	Conference	Standing	Bowl/playoffs
Colorado Mesa Mavericks (Rocky Mountain Athletic Conference) (2022–present)
2022	Colorado Mesa	4–6	3–6	T–6th	
2023	Colorado Mesa	6–5	4–4	T–4th	
2024	Colorado Mesa	7–4	6–3	T–3rd	
2025	Colorado Mesa	6–5	5–4	T–4th	
2026	Colorado Mesa	0–0	0–0		
Colorado Mesa:		23–20	18–17		
Total:		23–20			
