= Carl Roepke =

American luger and sports announcer

- Known for: 2008 and 2009 USA Luge National Masters Champion

Carl Roepke was a member of the USA Luge Team from 1983 to 1988. Roepke is the 2008 and 2009 U.S. Luge National Masters Champion.

He became a commentator for the Olympics in 2002, and has since announced at the 2006, 2010, 2012, 2014, and 2018 Olympics. At times, his wife, Michelle Gleich, collaborates with him on Olympic commentary of bobsled, luge, and skeleton. He is also a commentator for the Miller Motor Sports Park in Tooele, Utah.

Roepke helped develop the public tour program at the Utah Olympic Park in Park City, Utah (site of the 2002 Winter Olympics ski events) and works there as a host and tour guide.
