= Johnny Cox (American football) =

American football coach (born 1972)

Current position
- Title: Head coach
- Team: Fort Lewis
- Conference: RMAC
- Record: 5–38

Biographical details
- Born: February 5, 1972 (age 54); Denver, Colorado, U.S.
- Education: Fort Lewis College (BA in exercise science, 1994); University of Texas (MS in kinesiology, 2000)

Playing career
- 1990–1993: Fort Lewis
- 1994: Green Bay Packers*
- 1995: Orlando Predators
- Position: Wide receiver

Coaching career (HC unless noted)
- 1994: Fort Lewis (DB)
- 1995: Overland HS (CO) (WR/DB)
- 1996: North Dakota State (GA)
- 1997–1998: Texas (GA)
- 1999: Fort Lewis (OC)
- 2000–2002: North Dakota State (WR)
- 2003–2006: Rex Putnam HS (OR)
- 2007: Holy Cross (WR/ST)
- 2008: Tampa Bay Buccaneers (DQC)
- 2010: Jacksonville Jaguars (OQC)
- 2011: Jacksonville Jaguars (WR)
- 2012–2013: North Carolina A&T (WR/RC)
- 2014–2021: UNC Pembroke (OC)
- 2022–present: Fort Lewis

Head coaching record
- Overall: 5–38 (college); 12–24 (high school)

Accomplishments and honors

Awards
- RMAC Offensive player of the Year (1993); 2× First Team All-RMAC (1992–1993)

Johnathan Cox (born February 5, 1972) is an American football coach. He is the head football coach for Fort Lewis College, a position he has held since 2022. He previously coached for Overland High School, North Dakota State, Texas, Rex Putnam High School, Holy Cross, the Tampa Bay Buccaneers and Jacksonville Jaguars of the National Football League (NFL), North Carolina A&T, and UNC Pembroke. He played college football for Fort Lewis as a wide receiver and professionally for the Green Bay Packers of the NFL and the Orlando Predators of the Arena Football League (AFL).

== Head coaching record ==
=== College ===
Year	Team	Overall	Conference	Standing	Bowl/playoffs
Fort Lewis Skyhawks (Rocky Mountain Athletic Conference) (2022–present)
2022	Fort Lewis	0–10	0–9	10th	
2023	Fort Lewis	0–11	0–9	10th	
2024	Fort Lewis	3–8	2–7	T–7th	
2025	Fort Lewis	2–9	1–8	9th	
2026	Fort Lewis	0–0	0–0		
Fort Lewis:		5–38	3–33		
Total:		5–38			

=== High school ===
Year	Team	Overall	Conference	Standing	Bowl/playoffs
Rex Putnam Kingsmen () (2004–2007)
2004	Rex Putnam	4–5	2–5	6th	
2005	Rex Putnam	2–7	1–6	8th	
2006	Rex Putnam	5–4	2–4	5th	
2007	Rex Putnam	1–8	0–6	7th	
Fort Lewis:		12–24	5–21		
Total:		12–24			
