= Josh Breske =

American football coach (born c. 1983)

Current position
- Title: Head coach
- Team: Black Hills State
- Conference: RMAC
- Record: 26–31

Biographical details
- Born: c. 1983 (age 42–43); Pierre, South Dakota, U.S.
- Education: Black Hills State University (2010); Chadron State College (2013)

Playing career
- 2005–2009: Black Hills State
- 2010: Wyoming Cavalry
- Position: Offensive lineman

Coaching career (HC unless noted)
- 2010: Black Hills State (SA)
- 2011: Robert Morris (GA)
- 2012–2013: Chadron State (GA)
- 2014–2015: Sioux Falls (TE)
- 2016: Sioux Falls (OL)
- 2017–2019: Lindenwood (OL)
- 2020–present: Black Hills State

Head coaching record
- Overall: 26–31

Joshua David Breske (born c. 1983) is an American college football coach. He is the head football coach for Black Hills State University, a position he has held since 2020. He previously coached for Robert Morris, Chadron State, Sioux Falls, and Lindenwood. He played college football for Black Hills State and professionally for the Wyoming Cavalry of the American Indoor Football Association (AIFA) as an offensive lineman.

== Head coaching record ==
Year	Team	Overall	Conference	Standing	Bowl/playoffs
Black Hills State Yellow Jackets (Rocky Mountain Athletic Conference) (2020–present)
2020–21	Black Hills State	0–2			
2021	Black Hills State	4–7	2–7	8th	
2022	Black Hills State	7–4	5–4	5th	
2023	Black Hills State	6–5	5–4	T–4th	
2024	Black Hills State	6–5	5–4	T–5th	
2025	Black Hills State	3–8	3–6	T–7th	
2026	Black Hills State	0–0	0–0		
Black Hills State:		26–31	20–25		
Total:		26–31			
