= Maurice Flowers =

American football coach (born 1969)

Current position
- Title: Head coach
- Team: Johnson C. Smith
- Conference: CIAA
- Record: 35–18

Biographical details
- Born: January 1, 1969 (age 57); South Bend, Indiana, U.S.
- Education: Johnson C. Smith University (1991); University of Texas at Arlington (2000)

Playing career
- 1987–1990: Johnson C. Smith
- Position: Quarterback

Coaching career (HC unless noted)
- 1996–1997: Myers Park HS (NC) (OC/QB)
- 1998: Sam Houston HS (TX) (WR)
- 1999: Sam Houston HS (TX) (QB)
- 2000: Duncanville HS (TX) (QB)
- 2001–2006: Olympic HS (NC)
- 2007: West Charlotte HS (NC)
- 2008–2009: Chester Senior HS (SC)
- 2010–2011: Johnson C. Smith (OC)
- 2012–2013: Shaw (AHC/OC)
- 2014–2015: Campbell (QB)
- 2016: Miles (OC/QB)
- 2017: Fayetteville State (OC/QB)
- 2018: Mississippi Valley State (OC/QB)
- 2019: Fayetteville State (OC/QB)
- 2020–2021: Fort Valley State
- 2022–present: Johnson C. Smith

Head coaching record
- Overall: 42–23 (college)
- Bowls: 0–1
- Tournaments: 0–1 (NCAA D-II playoffs)

Accomplishments and honors

Championships
- 1 CIAA (2025)

Awards
- 2× CIAA Coach of the Year (2024, 2025)

Maurice Allen Flowers (born January 1, 1969) is an American college football coach. He is the head football coach for Johnson C. Smith University, a position he has held since 2022. He also was the head coach for the Fort Valley State Wildcats football team from 2020 to 2021. He also coached for Myers Park High School, Sam Houston High School, Duncanville High School, Olympic High School, West Charlotte High School, Chester Senior High School, Shaw, Campbell, Miles, Fayetteville State, and Mississippi Valley State. He played college football for Johnson C. Smith as a quarterback.

== Head coaching record ==
=== College ===
Year	Team	Overall	Conference	Standing	Bowl/playoffs	AFCA^{#}	D2^{°}
Fort Valley State Wildcats (Southern Intercollegiate Athletic Conference) (2020–2021)
2020–21	Fort Valley State	2–0	0–0	N/A			
2021	Fort Valley State	5–5	3–3	4th (East)			
Fort Valley State:		7–5	3–3				
Johnson C. Smith Golden Bulls (Central Intercollegiate Athletic Association) (2022–present)
2022	Johnson C. Smith	2–7	2–6	5th (Southern)			
2023	Johnson C. Smith	7–4	6–2	2nd (Southern)	L Florida Beach		
2024	Johnson C. Smith	8–2	5–2	T–3rd			
2025	Johnson C. Smith	10–2	7–1	1st	L NCAA Division II First Round	18	23
Johnson C. Smith:		27–15	20–11				
Total:		34–20					
