= Western Colorado Mountaineers football =

- First season: 1922
- Head coach: Jas Bains; 16th season, 75–86 (.466)
- Location: Gunnison, Colorado
- Stadium: Mountaineer Bowl (capacity: 4,000)
- NCAA division: Division II
- Conference: RMAC
- Colors: Crimson and slate
- Website: Mountaineers Football

The Western Colorado Mountaineers team (formerly Western State Mountaineers) represents Western Colorado University, located in Gunnison, Colorado, in NCAA Division II college football. The Mountaineers began playing football in 1922, and compete as members of the Rocky Mountain Athletic Conference (RMAC).

Western Colorado play their home games at the Mountaineer Bowl, the highest college football stadium in the United States.

== Conference history ==
- 1924–present: Rocky Mountain Athletic Conference

== Championships ==
=== Conference championships ===
Western Colorado has won 20 RMAC conference championships in football as of 2023. They were named conference champions in 1954, 1963, 1964, 1965, 1966, 1971, 1973, 1974, 1975, 1976, 1977, 1978, 1979, 1991, 1992, 1994, 1995, 1997, 1998, and 2021.
