= Jay Long =

American football player and coach (born c. 1977)

Current position
- Title: Head coach
- Team: Chadron State
- Conference: RMAC
- Record: 80–69

Biographical details
- Born: c. 1977 (age 48–49); Sturgis, South Dakota, U.S.
- Education: Chadron State College; Wayne State University

Playing career
- 1997–1999: Chadron State
- 2000: Casper Cavalry
- 2001: Rapid City Red Dogs
- Position: Center

Coaching career (HC unless noted)
- 2001–2002: Wayne State (DL)
- 2003–2008: Black Hills State (OC/OL)
- 2009–2011: Black Hills State
- 2012–present: Chadron State

Head coaching record
- Overall: 95–84
- Tournaments: 0–2 (NCAA D-II playoffs)

Jay Long (born c. 1977) is an American college football coach and former center. He is the head football coach for Chadron State College, a position he has held since 2012. He was previously the head coach for the Black Hills State Yellow Jackets football team from 2009 to 2011. He was the defensive line coach for Wayne State. He played college football for Chadron State as a center and professionally for the Casper Cavalry and Rapid City Red Dogs of the National Indoor Football League (NIFL).

== Head coaching record ==
Year	Team	Overall	Conference	Standing	Bowl/playoffs	AFCA^{#}
Black Hills State Yellow Jackets (Dakota Athletic Conference) (2009–2010)
2009	Black Hills State	6–4	5–3	T–3rd		
2010	Black Hills State	6–4	5–3	4th		
Black Hills State Yellow Jackets (NCAA Division II independent) (2011)
2011	Black Hills State	3–7				
Black Hills State:		15–15	10–6			
Chadron State Eagles (Rocky Mountain Athletic Conference) (2012–present)
2012	Chadron State	9–3	8–1	2nd	L NCAA Division II First Round	18
2013	Chadron State	8–3	7–2	T–2nd		
2014	Chadron State	8–3	7–2	3rd		
2015	Chadron State	5–6	4–5	T–5th		
2016	Chadron State	3–8	3–7	T–8th		
2017	Chadron State	6–5	6–4	4th		
2018	Chadron State	7–3	7–3	T–3rd		
2019	Chadron State	6–5	5–5	T–5th		
2020–21	Chadron State	2–1	0–0	N/A		
2021	Chadron State	6–5	5–4	5th		
2022	Chadron State	3–8	3–6	T–6th		
2023	Chadron State	5–6	4–5	T–6th		
2024	Chadron State	3–8	2–7	T–7th		
2025	Chadron State	8–4	8–1	2nd	L NCAA Division II First Round	23
2026	Chadron State	1–1	0–0			
Chadron State:		80–69	69–52			
Total:		95–84				
