= 2022 Great Lakes Valley Conference football season =

- Sport: Football
- Teams: 7
- Champion: Indianapolis

Football seasons
- 2021 2023

2022 Great Lakes Valley Conference football standings
	Conf.			Overall
Team	W		L	W		L
No. 17 Indianapolis $^	6	–	0	9	–	2
No. 25 Truman State #	5	–	1	9	–	2
Southwest Baptist	4	–	2	6	–	5
McKendree	2	–	4	5	–	6
Missouri S&T	2	–	4	3	–	7
Quincy	1	–	5	4	–	7
William Jewell	1	–	5	2	–	9
$ – Conference champion; ^ – NCAA Division II playoff participant; # – America's Crossroads Bowl participant; Rankings from AFCA poll

The 2022 Great Lakes Valley Conference football season was the season of college football contested by the seven football-playing member schools of the Great Lakes Valley Conference (GLVC) as part of the 2022 NCAA Division II football season.

Indianapolis compiled a 9–1 record, won the GLVC championship, and was ranked No. 13 in the final regular season NCAA Division II poll. The Greyhounds lost to Pittsburg State in the first round of the NCAA Division II playoffs. Truman State compiled a 8–2 record and was ranked No. 23 in the final regular season poll. The Bulldogs defeated Tiffin in the third America's Crossroads Bowl. Indianapolis led the conference in scoring offense with an average of 35.8 points per game. Truman State led in scoring defense, giving up an average of 18.6 points per game.

Senior quarterback Turner Pullen of McKendree tallied 3,541 passing yards and was selected as the GLVC Offensive Player of the Year. Senior linebacker Ben Straatmann of Missouri S&T was selected as the Defensive Player of the Year. Toriano Clinton of Indianapolis led the conference with 1,001 rushing yards, and Yogi Flagler Jr. of McKendree led with 1,144 receiving yards.

== Conference overview ==
Conf. rank	Team	Head coach	Overall record	Conf. record	Points scored/game	Points against/game
1	Indianapolis	Chris Keevers	9–2	6–0	35.8	23.0
2	Truman State	Gregg Nesbitt	9–2	5–1	31.0	18.6
3	Southwest Baptist	Robert Clardy	6–5	4–2	31.3	30.5
4	McKendree	Mike Babcock	5–6	2–4	33.1	37.1
5	Missouri S&T	Andy Ball	3–7	2–4	20.7	26.7
6	Quincy	Gary Bass	4–7	1–5	31.3	34.3
7	William Jewell	Mike McGlinchey Jr.	2–9	1–5	18.9	37.6

== Conference awards ==
=== Individual honors ===
- Offensive Player of the Year - Turner Pullen, senior, quarterback, McKendree
- Defensive Player of the Year - Ben Straatmann, senior, linebacker, Missouri S&T
- Special Teams Player of the Year - Gideon Niboh, junior, kick and punt returner, Missouri S&T
- Freshman of the Year - Cameren Smith, running back, Missouri S&T
- Co-Coaches of the Year - Chris Keevers, Indianapolis; Greg Nesbitt, Truman State

=== All-GLVC team ===
Offense

- Offensive linemen - Justin Watson, Truman State; Alan (BJ) Wilson, Quincy; Kednal Alexis, Indianapolis; Dane Eggert, Truman State; Dami Oyesanya, Southwest Baptist; Austin Keele, Indianapolis
- Quarterback - Turner Pullen, McKendree
- Running backs - Toriano Clinton, Indianapolis; Shamar Griffith, Truman State; Narkel LeFlore, McKendree
- Receivers - Yogi Flager, McKendree; Jacob Bachman, McKendree; Alonzo Derrick, Indianapolis; Curtis Cuillard, Southwest Baptist
- Tight end - Matt Hall, Truman State
- O-UT - Collin Sutton, Truman State

Defense

- Defensive linemen - Robert Greco, Truman State; Aaron Barnett, Indianapolis; Henry Preckel, Missouri S&T; Ben Miller, Truman State; Dylan Shelton, Indianapolis
- Linebackers - Ben Hunnius, Indianapolis; Ben Straatmann, Missouri S&T; Kiave Guerrier, Indianapolis; Isaiah Estes, Truman State; Coleton Smith, Southwest Baptist
- Landry Mavungu, Indianapolis; Ben Thomas, Truman State; Ben Watson, Truman State; Brenden Smith, Southwest Baptist; Michael Brown, Indianapolis
- D-UT - Jake Closser, Truman State

Special teams

- Kicker - Grant Ross, Truman State
- Punter - Parker Boyce, Missouri S&T
- Punt and kick returner - Gideon Niboh, Missouri S&T
- Long snappers - Doug Haugh, Indianapolis; Casey Voichahoske, Truman State

== Teams ==
=== Indianapolis ===
2022 Indianapolis Greyhounds football

GLVC champion
- Conference: Great Lakes Valley Conference

Ranking
- AFCA: No. 13
- Record: 9–2 (6–0 GLVC)
- Head coach: Chris Keevers (4th season)
- Offensive coordinator: Brad Wilson (3rd season)
- Defensive coordinator: Tim Cooper (4th season)
- Home stadium: Key Stadium

The 2022 Indianapolis Greyhounds football team represented the University of Indianapolis as a member of the Great Lakes Valley Conference (GLVC) during the 2022 NCAA Division II football season. The Greyhounds compiled a 9–2 record (6–0 against conference opponents) and won the GLVC championship. They were ranked No. 13 nationally at the end of the regular season and No. 17 nationally at the end of the postseason.

Date	Opponent	Rank	Site	Result	Attendance	Source
September 3	Saint Xavier*		Key Stadium; Indianapolis, IN	W 57–0	4,486	
September 17	at Tiffin*		Frost Kalnow Stadium; Tiffin, OH	W 27–20	2,650	
September 24	at Ohio Dominican*		Panther Stadium; Columbus, OH	W 44–38	2,154	
October 1	Southwest Baptist^{†}	No. 14	Key Stadium; Indianapolis, IN	W 44–17	6,127	
October 8	at McKendree		Leemon Field; Lebanon, IL	W 38–23	2,800	
October 15	at Saginaw Valley*		Wickes Stadium; University Center, MI	L 14–38	3,101	
October 22	Quincy		Key Stadium; Indianapolis, IN	W 52–38	4,054	
October 29	Missouri S&T		Key Stadium; Indianapolis, IN	W 42–16	3,824	
November 5	at William Jewell	No. 15	Greene Stadium; Liberty, MO	W 48–14	1,268	
November 12	No. 20 Truman State		Key Stadium; Indianapolis, IN	W 28–14	3,227	
November 19	at No. 4 Pittsburg State		Carnie Smith Stadium; Pittsburg, KS	L 0–35	4,751	
*Non-conference game; ^{†}Homecoming; Rankings from Coaches' Poll released prior to the game

=== Truman State ===
2022 Truman Bulldogs football
- Conference: Great Lakes Valley Conference

Ranking
- AFCA: No. 23
- Record: 9–2 (5–1 GLVC)
- Head coach: Gregg Nesbitt (13th season)
- Offensive coordinator: Jason Killday (7th season)
- Defensive coordinator: Kellen Nesbitt (13th season)
- Home stadium: Stokes Stadium

The 2022 Truman State Bulldogs football team represented Truman State University as a member of the Great Lakes Valley Conference (GLVC) during the 2022 NCAA Division II football season. The Bulldogs compiled a 9–2 record (5–1 against conference opponents) and finished second in the GLVC. They were ranked No. 23 nationally at the end of the regular season and No. 25 nationally at the end of the postseason.

Date	Opponent	Rank	Site	Result	Attendance	Source
September 3	Davenport*		Stokes Stadium; Kirksville, MO	L 19–20	2,800	
September 10	at South Dakota Mines*		O'Harra Stadium; Rapid City, SD	W 27–20	1,955	
September 17	at Hillsdale*		Frank "Muddy" Waters Stadium; Hillsdale, MI	W 21–13	1,724	
September 24	Tiffin*		Stokes Stadium; Kirksville, MO	W 18–17 ^{OT}	3,400	
October 8	Missouri S&T^{†}		Stokes Stadium; Kirksville, MO	W 36–14	3,400	
October 15	Southwest Baptist		Stokes Stadium; Kirksville, MO	W 25–20	1,332	
October 22	at William Jewell		Greene Stadium; Liberty, MO	W 42–7	1,535	
October 29	at Quincy		QU Stadium; Quincy, IL	W 59–32	1,274	
November 5	McKendree		Stokes Stadium; Kirksville, MO	W 52–7	1,194	
November 12	at Indianapolis	No. 20	Key Stadium; Indianapolis, IN	L 14–28	3,227	
December 3	Tiffin*		Brickyard Stadium; Hobart, IN (America's Crossroads Bowl)	W 28–27	808	
*Non-conference game; ^{†}Homecoming; Rankings from AFCA Poll released prior to the game

=== Southwest Baptist ===
2022 Southwest Baptist Bearcats football
- Conference: Great Lakes Valley Conference
- Record: 6–5 (4–2 GLVC)
- Head coach: Robert Clardy (8th season)
- Defensive coordinator: Johnny Stilwell (1st season)
- Co-defensive coordinator: Tyler Curts (1st season)
- Home stadium: Plaster Stadium

The 2022 Southwest Baptist Bearcats football team represented Southwest Baptist University as a member of the Great Lakes Valley Conference (GLVC) during the 2022 NCAA Division II football season. The Greyhounds compiled a 6–5 record (4–2 against conference opponents) and finished third in the GLVC.

Date	Opponent	Site	Result	Attendance	Source
September 3	at UT Permian Basin*	Astound Broadband Stadium; Odessa, TX	W 41–17	4,561	
September 10	No. 6 West Florida*	Plaster Stadium; Bolivar, MO	L 10–49	2,040	
September 17	at Findlay*	Donnell Stadium; Findlay, OH	L 35–52	727	
September 24	Lake Erie*	Plaster Stadium; Bolivar, MO	W 52–31	625	
October 1	at No. 14 Indianapolis	Key Stadium; Indianapolis, IN	L 17–44	6,127	
October 8	William Jewell^{†}	Plaster Stadium; Bolivar, MO	W 44–21	2,365	
October 15	at Truman State	Stokes Stadium; Kirksville, MO	L 20–25	1,332	
October 22	at Tarleton State*	Memorial Stadium; Stephenville, TX	L 10–24	11,086	
October 29	at McKendree	Leemon Field; Lebanon, IL	W 49–31	2,850	
November 5	Quincy	Plaster Stadium; Bolivar, MO	W 42–24	258	
November 12	at Missouri S&T	Allgood-Bailey Stadium; Rolla, MO	W 24–17	1,768	
*Non-conference game; ^{†}Homecoming; Rankings from Coaches' Poll released prior to the game

=== McKendree ===
2022 McKendree Bearcats football
- Conference: Great Lakes Valley Conference
- Record: 5–6 (2–4 GLVC)
- Head coach: Mike Babcock (10th season)
- Offensive coordinator: Nick Miller (1st season)
- Defensive coordinator: Jason Rejfek (3rd season)
- Home stadium: Leemon Field

The 2022 McKendree Bearcats football team represented McKendree University as a member of the Great Lakes Valley Conference (GLVC) during the 2022 NCAA Division II football season. The Greyhounds compiled a 5–6 record (2–4 against conference opponents) and finished fourth in the GLVC.

Date	Opponent	Site	Result	Attendance	Source
September 1	at Northern Michigan*	Superior Dome; Marquette, MI	W 31–24 ^{OT}	1,200	
September 10	Delta State*	Leemon Field; Lebanon, IL	L 34–58	3,500	
September 17	at Lake Erie*	Jack Britt Memorial Stadium; Painesville, OH	W 38–37	494	
September 24	Walsh*	Leemon Field; Lebanon, IL	W 46–10	3,200	
October 1	at William Jewell	Greene Stadium; Liberty, MO	W 45–34	1,272	
October 8	Indianapolis	Leemon Field; Lebanon, IL	L 23–38	2,800	
October 15	Quincy	Leemon Field; Lebanon, IL	L 62–63 ^{OT}	2,850	
October 22	at Missouri S&T	Allgood-Bailey Stadium; Rolla, MO	W 42–35	2,787	
October 29	Southwest Baptist^{†}	Leemon Field; Lebanon, IL	L 31–49	2,850	
November 5	at Truman State	Stokes Stadium; Kirksville, MO	L 7–52	1,194	
November 12	at Lindenwood*	Harlen C. Hunter Stadium; St. Charles, MO	L 35–63	2,777	
*Non-conference game; ^{†}Homecoming

=== Missouri S&T ===
2022 Missouri S&T Miners football
- Conference: Great Lakes Valley Conference
- Record: 3–7 (2–4 GLVC)
- Head coach: Andy Ball (1st season)
- Defensive coordinator: Corey Sudhoff (2nd season)
- Home stadium: Allgood–Bailey Stadium

The 2022 Missouri S&T Miners football team represented the Missouri University of Science and Technology as a member of the Great Lakes Valley Conference (GLVC) during the 2022 NCAA Division II football season. The Miners compiled a 3–7 record (2–4 against conference opponents) and finished fifth in the GLVC.

Date	Opponent	Site	Result	Attendance	Source
September 1	South Dakota Mines*	Allgood–Bailey Stadium; Rolla, MO	L 20–43	2,796	
September 10	at Drake*	Drake Stadium; Des Moines, IA	W 17–14 ^{OT}	1,827	
September 17	at Kentucky Wesleyan*	Steele Stadium; Owensboro, KY	L 6–11	1,000	
September 24	Hillsdale*	Allgood–Bailey Stadium; Rolla, MO	L 10–17	2,909	
October 1	Quincy	Allgood–Bailey Stadium; Rolla, MO	W 31–24	2,213	
October 8	at Truman State	Stokes Stadium; Kirksville, MO	L 14–36	3,400	
October 15	at William Jewell	Greene Stadium; Liberty, MO	W 41–14	1,309	
October 22	McKendree^{†}	Allgood–Bailey Stadium; Rolla, MO	L 35–42	2,787	
October 29	at Indianapolis	Key Stadium; Indianapolis, IN	L 16–42	3,824	
November 12	Southwest Baptist	Allgood–Bailey Stadium; Rolla, MO	L 17–24	1,768	
*Non-conference game; ^{†}Homecoming

=== Quincy ===
2022 Quincy Hawks football
- Conference: Great Lakes Valley Conference
- Record: 4–7 (1–5 GLVC)
- Head coach: Gary Bass (6th season)
- Offensive coordinator: Kaleb Borghardt (3rd season)
- Defensive coordinator: Michael Pannone (1st season)
- Home stadium: QU Stadium

The 2022 Quincy Hawks football team represented Quincy University as a member of the Great Lakes Valley Conference (GLVC) during the 2022 NCAA Division II football season. The Miners compiled a 4–7 record 1–5 against conference opponents) and finished sixth in the GLVC.

Date	Opponent	Site	Result	Attendance	Source
September 1	Glenville State*	QU Stadium; Quincy, IL	L 15–44	1,000	
September 8	Trinity International*	QU Stadium; Quincy, IL	W 53–14	1,212	
September 17	at Walsh (OH)*	Staudt Field; North Canton, OH	W 28–13	711	
September 24	Ashland*^{†}	QU Stadium; Quincy, IL	L 14–34	500	
October 1	at Missouri S&T	Allgood-Bailey Stadium; Rolla, MO	L 24–31	2,213	
October 8	Kentucky Wesleyan*	QU Stadium; Quincy, IL	W 46–9	432	
October 15	at McKendree	Leemon Field; Lebanon, IL	W 63–62 ^{OT}	2,850	
October 22	at Indianapolis	Key Stadium; Indianapolis, IN	L 38–52	4,054	
October 29	Truman State	QU Stadium; Quincy, IL	L 32–59	1,274	
November 5	at Southwest Baptist	Plaster Stadium; Bolivar, MO	L 24–42	258	
November 12	William Jewell	QU Stadium; Quincy, IL	L 7–17	1,235	
*Non-conference game; ^{†}Homecoming

=== William Jewell ===
2022 William Jewell Cardinals football
- Conference: Great Lakes Valley Conference
- Record: 2–9 (1–5 GLVC)
- Head coach: Mike McGlinchey Jr. (3rd season)
- Offensive coordinator: Neil Linhart (3rd season)
- Defensive coordinator: Louis Cortes (1st season)
- Home stadium: Greene Stadium

The 2022 William Jewell Cardinals football team represented William Jewell College as a member of the Great Lakes Valley Conference (GLVC) during the 2022 NCAA Division II football season. The Cardinals compiled a 2–9 record (1–5 against conference opponents) and finished fifth in the GLVC.

Date	Opponent	Site	Result	Attendance	Source
September 1	Colorado Mesa University*	Greene Stadium; Liberty, MO	L 14–37		
September 10	at Black Hills State*	Lyle Hare Stadium; Spearfish, SD	L 19–38	1,226	
September 17	at Ohio Dominican*	Panther Stadium; Columbus, OH	L 21–31	1,159	
September 24	Kentucky Wesleyan*	Greene Stadium; Liberty, MO	W 24–17		
October 1	McKendree^{†}	Greene Stadium; Liberty, MO	L 34–45	1,272	
October 8	at Southwest Baptist	Plaster Stadium; Bolivar, MO	L 21–44	2,365	
October 15	Missouri S&T	Greene Stadium; Liberty, MO	L 14–41	1,309	
October 22	Truman State	Greene Stadium; Liberty, MO	L 7–42	1,535	
October 29	at Lindenwood*	Harlen C. Hunter Stadium; St. Charles, MO	L 23–64	2,872	
November 5	No. 15 Indianapolis	Greene Stadium; Liberty, MO	L 14–48	1,268	
November 12	at Quincy	QU Stadium; Quincy, IL	W 17–7	1,235	
*Non-conference game; ^{†}Homecoming; Rankings from Coaches' Poll released prior to the game
