= List of Virginia–Wise Cavaliers head football coaches =

The Virginia–Wise Cavaliers football program is a college football team that represents University of Virginia's College at Wise as a member of the South Atlantic Conference (SAC) at the NCAA Division II level. The team has had five head coaches since its first recorded football game in 1991. Since December 2024, Gary Bass has served as head coach of UVA Wise.

== Key ==
Key to symbols in coaches list
General		Overall		Conference		Postseason (Note: Although the first Rose Bowl Game was played in 1902, it has been continuously played since the 1916 game, and is recognized as the oldest bowl game by the NCAA. "—" indicates any season prior to 1916 when postseason games were not played.)	
No.	Order of coaches (Note: A running total of the number of head coaches, with coaches who served separate tenures being counted only once. Interim head coaches are represented with "Int" and are not counted in the running total. "—" indicates the team played but either without a coach or no coach is on record. "X" indicates an interim year without play.)	GC	Games coached	CW	Conference wins	PW	Postseason wins
DC	Division championships	OW	Overall wins	CL	Conference losses	PL	Postseason losses
CC	Conference championships	OL	Overall losses	CT	Conference ties	PT	Postseason ties
NC	National championships	OT	Overall ties (Note: Overtime rules in college football were introduced in 1996, making ties impossible in the period since.)	C%	Conference winning percentage		
†	Elected to the College Football Hall of Fame	O%	Overall winning percentage (Note: When computing the win–loss percentage, a tie counts as half a win and half a loss.)				

== Coaches ==
No.	Name	Term	GC	OW	OL	OT	O%	CW	CL	CT	C%	PW	PL	CCs	Awards
1	Bill Ramseyer	1991–2001	108	62	46	0	.574	—	—	—	—	—	—	—	—
2	Bruce W. Wasem	2002–2011	109	51	58	—	.468	—	—	—	—	—	—	—	—
3	Dewey Lusk	2012–2015	44	8	36	—	.182	6	28	—	.176	—	—	—	—
4	Dane Damron	2016–2023	79	27	52	—	.342	21	46	—	.313	—	—	—	—
5	Gary Bass	2024–present	20	5	15	—	.250	3	13	—	.188	—	—	—	—
