= Gary Bass =

Gary Bass may refer to:

- Gary J. Bass (fl. 2000s–2020s), author and professor at Princeton University
- Gary D. Bass (fl. 1980s), founder of OMB Watch
- Gary Bass (American football) (born 1983 or 1984), American college football coach
