= Plaster Stadium =

Plaster Stadium may refer to:

- Plaster Stadium (Southwest Baptist), in Bolivar, Missouri, U.S.
- Robert W. Plaster Stadium, in Springfield, Missouri, U.S.
