= Robert Clardy =

American football coach (born 1984)

Robert Ira Clardy
Current position
- Title: Head coach
- Team: Bolivar HS (MO)
- Record: 8-12

Biographical details
- Born: July 25, 1984 (age 42); Missouri, U.S.
- Education: Southwest Baptist University (2008)

Playing career
- 2004–2007: Southwest Baptist
- Position: Quarterback

Coaching career (HC unless noted)
- 2008–2010: Southwest Baptist (QB)
- 2011–2012: Southwest Baptist (OC/QB)
- 2013–2014: Southwest Baptist (AHC/WR)
- 2015–2024: Southwest Baptist
- 2025–present: Bolivar HS (MO)

Head coaching record
- Overall: 39–60 (college)
- Tournaments: 0–1 (NCAA D-II playoffs)

Accomplishments and honors

Championships
- 1 GLVC (2016)

Awards
- GLVC Coach of the Year (2016)

Robert Ira Clardy (born July 25, 1984) is an American high school football coach. He is the head football coach at Bolivar High School in Bolivar, Missouri, a position he has held since 2025. Clardy served as the head football coach at Southwest Baptist University from 2015 to 2024, compiling a record of 39–60 in ten seasons. He was an assistant coach at Southwest Baptist for seven seasons prior to his head-coaching tenure. He played college football for Southwest Baptist as a quarterback.

== Head coaching record ==
=== College ===
Year	Team	Overall	Conference	Standing	Bowl/playoffs	AFCA^{#}
Southwest Baptist Bearcats (Great Lakes Valley Conference) (2015–2024)
2015	Southwest Baptist	4–6	3–5	T–6th		
2016	Southwest Baptist	10–2	7–1	T–1st	L NCAA Division II First Round	22
2017	Southwest Baptist	5–5	4–3	T–4th		
2018	Southwest Baptist	0–10	0–7	8th		
2019	Southwest Baptist	3–8	1–6	7th		
2020–21	Southwest Baptist	1–2	1–2	3rd (West)		
2021	Southwest Baptist	4–7	3–4	T–5th		
2022	Southwest Baptist	6–5	4–2	3rd		
2023	Southwest Baptist	4–7	3–4	T–5th		
2024	Southwest Baptist	2–8	1–7	8th		
Southwest Baptist:		39–60	27–41			
Total:		39–60				
National championship Conference title Conference division title or championship game berth

Coach Clardy was succeeded by Paul Hansen as the head football coach of SBU.

== Personal life ==
Clardy lives in Bolivar with his wife, Krysten, and their three children: daughters Addyson and Brooklynn, and son Lawson.

Krysten Clardy (née Bartshe; born January 7, 1987) is a 2009 graduate of SBU and was an All-MIAA soccer player for the Bearcats from Carson City, Nevada. She currently serves as the Associate Athletic Director for Compliance and Senior Woman Administrator at Southwest Baptist University.
