= Kade Warner =

American football wide receiver (born 1998)

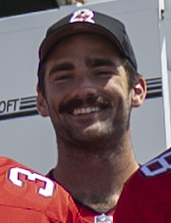
- Warner with the Tampa Bay Buccaneers in 2023

Quincy Hawks
- Title: Offensive coordinator & quarterbacks coach

Personal information
- Born: September 29, 1998 (age 28); St. Louis, Missouri, U.S.
- Listed height: 6 ft 1 in (1.85 m)
- Listed weight: 201 lb (91 kg)

Career information
- Position: Wide receiver
- High school: Desert Mountain (Scottsdale, Arizona)
- College: Nebraska (2017–2020); Kansas State (2021–2022)
- NFL draft: 2023: undrafted

Career history

Playing
- Tampa Bay Buccaneers (2023)*; Houston Roughnecks (2024)*; San Antonio Brahmas (2024)
- * Offseason or practice squad member only

Coaching
- Quincy (2025–present) Offensive coordinator & quarterbacks coach

Kade Warner (born September 29, 1998) is an American college football coach and former professional wide receiver. He is the offensive coordinator and quarterbacks coach for Quincy University, positions he has held since 2025. He played college football at Nebraska and Kansas State.

== Early life ==
The son of Pro Football Hall of Fame quarterback Kurt Warner, Kade Warner was born on September 29, 1998, and grew up in Scottsdale, Arizona. He attended Desert Mountain High School and played football, basketball, track and lacrosse. He is the brother of quarterback E. J. Warner. In football, Warner played wide receiver and was twice named all-state, additionally being named the state's wide receiver of the year in 2016 as he broke Mark Andrews' record for career receptions with 241. As a senior, he totaled 1,062 receiving yards off 83 catches with 14 touchdowns. Despite his production, Warner did not receive a single scholarship offer to play college football. He eventually joined the Nebraska Cornhuskers as a walk-on.

== College career ==
Warner broke his hand three days into fall practice in 2017 and redshirted for his freshman season. He was a third-stringer for the beginning of the 2018 season, being promoted to a starting role in Week 5. He started seven of the last nine games and posted 17 catches for 95 yards on the year. Warner missed the first four games of 2019 due to an injury, and made a total of seven appearances in the season, starting five games while tallying eight receptions for 101 yards. In 2020, he played in every game, starting four as captain but only making five catches for 40 yards.

Warner transferred to play for the Kansas State Wildcats in 2021. In his first season with them, he made 13 appearances and totaled 14 receptions for 166 yards. Warner was team captain for his final year, 2022, and posted a career-high 46 receptions for 456 yards with five touchdowns.

== Professional career ==
Pre-draft measurables
Height	Weight	Arm length	Hand span	Wingspan	40-yard dash	10-yard split	20-yard split	20-yard shuttle	Three-cone drill	Vertical jump	Broad jump	Bench press
6 ft 0 7/8 in (1.85 m)	203 lb (92 kg)	31 in (0.79 m)	9 5/8 in (0.24 m)	6 ft 3 1/2 in (1.92 m)	4.72 s	1.63 s	2.75 s	4.23 s	7.02 s	35.0 in (0.89 m)	9 ft 0 in (2.74 m)	13 reps
All values from Pro Day

=== Tampa Bay Buccaneers ===
After going unselected in the 2023 NFL draft, Warner was signed by the Tampa Bay Buccaneers as an undrafted free agent. He was waived on August 28, 2023.

=== Houston Roughnecks ===
On December 8, 2023, Warner signed with the Houston Roughnecks of the XFL. The Roughnecks brand was transferred to the Houston Gamblers when the XFL and United States Football League merged to create the United Football League (UFL).

=== San Antonio Brahmas ===
On January 5, 2024, Warner was selected by the San Antonio Brahmas during the 2024 UFL dispersal draft, one of many 2023 Roughnecks who moved to the 2024 Brahmas along with head coach Wade Phillips. He was released on March 10, 2024. He was re-signed on May 28. He was waived on August 23, 2024.

== Coaching career ==
In 2025, Warner was named offensive coordinator for Quincy under head coach Jason Killday.
