= Chris Keevers =

American football coach (born 1966)

Current position
- Title: Head coach
- Team: Indianapolis
- Conference: GLVC
- Record: 65–18

Biographical details
- Born: 1966 (age 59–60); Indianapolis, Indiana, U.S.
- Education: Purdue University (1989, 1991)

Playing career
- 1984–1985: Coffeyville
- 1986–1987: Purdue
- Position: Defensive lineman

Coaching career (HC unless noted)
- 1988–1990: Purdue (DL)
- 1991–1993: Saint Mary's (CA) (DL/ST)
- 1994–2000: Indianapolis (DL/ST)
- 2001–2003: Indianapolis (DC/ST)
- 2004–2009: Indianapolis (LB/ST)
- 2010–2018: Indianapolis (DC/ST)
- 2019–present: Indianapolis

Head coaching record
- Overall: 65–18
- Tournaments: 1–5 (NCAA D-II playoffs)

Accomplishments and honors

Championships
- 5 GLVC (2020-21, 2022, 2023, 2024, 2025); 1 GLVC East Division (2020-21)

Awards
- GLVC Coach of the Year (2020-21, 2022-co, 2023, 2024)

Christopher Keevers (born 1966) is an American college football coach. He is head football coach at the University of Indianapolis (UIndy), a position he has held since 2019.

A native of Indianapolis, Keevers graduated from John Marshall High School on the city's east side before moving on to Coffeyville Community College (Kansas), where he starred as a defensive lineman during the 1984 and 1985 seasons and made the Junior College All-American team as an Honorable Mention honoree. He then transferred to Purdue University, where he was a two-year starter in 1986 and 1987, prior to spending three seasons as a graduate assistant. He earned a communication degree from Purdue in 1989, followed by a master's degree in education administration in 1991.

== Coaching career ==
After leaving Purdue, Keevers worked for three seasons (1991 through 1993) as an assistant coach at St. Mary's College of California (then a Division II program), coaching the defensive line and special teams while also serving as strength & conditioning coach.

Keevers joined the staff at UIndy in 1994, beginning a 25-year career in a variety of assistant roles, primarily coaching the defensive line and special teams (later also linebackers). Initially he also served as assistant track coach and instructor of physical education, and for several years was strength & conditioning coach. He spent twelve seasons (2001–03 and 2010–18) as defensive coordinator for the Greyhounds, ultimately under head coach Bob Bartolomeo, whom he succeeded in 2019.

As head coach at UIndy, Keevers has built upon the successes of his predecessor. He led the Greyhounds to Great Lakes Valley Conference (GLVC) championships in the COVID-19 shortened 2020–21 season, then again in 2022, 2023, 2024, and 2025. His UIndy teams have qualified for the NCAA Division II football championship playoffs five times, in 2019, 2022, 2023, 2024, and 2025. The 2025 team (at 11–2) tied the UIndy record for most wins in a season and was rewarded with the program's best-ever ranking in the final AFCA poll, at #10. His peers have recognized him as GLVC coach of the year four times.

During his tenure as head coach, Keevers has become well known regionally as host of the Chris Keevers Indy Mega Camp, held every June at UIndy. Touted as "the #1 exposure camp in the Midwest," the event is open to high school players in the 9th through 12th grade, and typically attracts more than 300 collegiate coaches from over 100 different D1, D2, NAIA and D3 institutions.

== Head coaching record ==
Year	Team	Overall	Conference	Standing	Bowl/playoffs	AFCA^{#}	D2.com^{°}
Indianapolis Greyhounds (Great Lakes Valley Conference) (2019–present)
2019	Indianapolis	9–2	6–1	2nd	L NCAA Division II First Round	17	19
2020–21	Indianapolis	3–0	2–0	1st (East)			
2021	Indianapolis	7–4	5–2	2nd			
2022	Indianapolis	9–2	6–0	1st	L NCAA Division II First Round	17	20
2023	Indianapolis	9–2	6–1	1st	L NCAA Division II First Round	22	21
2024	Indianapolis	10–2	8–0	1st	L NCAA Division II First Round	19	25
2025	Indianapolis	11–2	8–0	1st	L NCAA Division II Second Round	10	12
2026	Indianapolis	7–4	6–2				
Indianapolis:		65–18	47–6				
Total:		65–18					
National championship Conference title Conference division title or championship game berth
