= 2026 Central Oklahoma Bronchos football team =

American college football season

2026 Central Oklahoma Bronchos football
- Conference: Mid-America Intercollegiate Athletics Association
- Record: 5–6 (4–5 MIAA)
- Head coach: Adam Dorrel (5th season; first 5 games); Cody Swanson (interim; remainder of season)
- Offensive coordinator: Patrick Briningstool (1st season)
- Offensive scheme: Spread
- Defensive coordinator: Cody Swanson (3rd season)
- Base defense: Multiple 4–3
- Home stadium: Chad Richison Stadium

2026 Mid-America Intercollegiate Athletics Association football standings
| | Conf. | | | | | Overall |
| Team | W | | L | | T | W | | L | | T |
|---|---|---|---|---|---|---|---|---|---|---|
| No. 8 Emporia State | 5 | – | 0 | – | 0 | 7 | – | 0 | – | 0 |
| No. 11 NW Missouri State | 4 | – | 1 | – | 0 | 5 | – | 1 | – | 0 |
| Central Missouri | 4 | – | 1 | – | 0 | 5 | – | 2 | – | 0 |
| Washburn | 3 | – | 2 | – | 0 | 4 | – | 2 | – | 1 |
| Central Oklahoma | 2 | – | 3 | – | 0 | 3 | – | 4 | – | 0 |
| Fort Hays State | 2 | – | 3 | – | 0 | 3 | – | 4 | – | 0 |
| Missouri Western | 2 | – | 3 | – | 0 | 3 | – | 4 | – | 0 |
| Pittsburg State | 2 | – | 3 | – | 0 | 2 | – | 5 | – | 0 |
| Nebraska–Kearney | 1 | – | 4 | – | 0 | 1 | – | 6 | – | 0 |
| Missouri Southern | 0 | – | 5 | – | 0 | 1 | – | 6 | – | 0 |
$ – Conference champion; ^ – NCAA Division II playoff participant; As of November 15, 2026; Rankings from AFCA Poll

The 2026 Central Oklahoma Bronchos football team represented the University of Central Oklahoma during the 2026 NCAA Division II football season as a member of the Mid-America Intercollegiate Athletics Association. The Bronchos played their home games at Chad Richison Stadium in Edmond, Oklahoma.

The Bronchos were led by fifth-year head coach Adam Dorrel for the first five games of the season. On October 3, following a 31–33 loss to Central Missouri, Dorrel aggressively pursued and screamed at the game's officials and had to be held back by his assistant coaches. Video of Dorrel's outburst quickly spread throughout social media, with Dorrel resigning as the Bronchos' head coach the following Monday on October 5. Defensive coordinator Cody Swanson was named the Bronchos' interim head coach for the rest of the season.

== MIAA preseason polls ==
The MIAA released its preseason coaches and media prediction polls on July 27, 2026. The Bronchos were predicted to finish third in both polls, while also receiving one first place vote in the media poll.

== Schedule ==
| Date | Time | Opponent | Site | Result | Attendance |
|---|---|---|---|---|---|
| August 27 | 6:00 p.m. | at Texas Wesleyan* | Crowley ISD Multi-Purpose Stadium; Fort Worth, TX | W 59–7 | 812 |
| September 12 | 6:00 p.m. | at Central Arkansas* | Estes Stadium; Conway, AR | L 20–59 | 6,743 |
| September 19 | 11:00 a.m. | at Washburn | Yager Stadium at Moore Bowl; Topeka, KS | L 10–14 | 3,750 |
| September 26 | 7:00 p.m. | No. 7 Northwest Missouri State^{†} | Chad Richison Stadium; Edmond, OK | W 19–14 | 8,474 |
| October 3 | 7:00 p.m. | at Central Missouri | Audrey J. Walton Stadium; Warrensburg, MO | L 31–33 | 6,432 |
| October 10 | 7:00 p.m. | Fort Hays State | Chad Richison Stadium; Edmond, OK | W 31–10 | 4,314 |
| October 17 | 1:00 p.m. | at No. 8 Emporia State | Francis G. Welch Stadium; Emporia, KS | L 16–23 | 3,953 |
| October 24 | 2:00 p.m. | at Pittsburg State | Carnie Smith Stadium; Pittsburg, KS | L 14–52 | 5,542 |
| October 31 | 1:00 p.m. | Nebraska–Kearney | Chad Richison Stadium; Edmond, OK | W 31–6 | 1,992 |
| November 7 | 1:00 p.m. | at Missouri Southern | Fred G. Hughes Stadium; Joplin, MO | L 14–23 | 1,267 |
| November 14 | 1:00 p.m. | Missouri Western | Chad Richison Stadium; Edmond, OK | W 30–24 ^{OT} | 5,227 |
*Non-conference game; ^{†}Homecoming; Rankings from AFCA Poll released prior to the game; All times are in Central time

== Game summaries ==
=== At Texas Wesleyan (NAIA) ===
Central Oklahoma Bronchos at Texas Wesleyan Rams (NAIA) – Game summary

| Quarter | 1 | 2 | 3 | 4 | Total |
|---|---|---|---|---|---|
| Bronchos | 14 | 21 | 14 | 10 | 59 |
| Rams (NAIA) | 0 | 0 | 7 | 0 | 7 |

at Crowley ISD Multi-Purpose Stadium, Fort Worth, Texas

- Date: August 27
- Game time: 6:00 p.m. CDT
- Game weather: Sunny • Temperature: 98 °F (37 °C) • Wind: NE 6 mph
- Game attendance: 812
- Referee: Bill Theodore
- Box score, Recap

Game information
First quarter
- UCO – Tahkari Bethel 31-yard pass from Jett Huff (Bradley Thao kick), 7:56. Bronchos 7–0. Drive: 6 plays, 80 yards, 1:25.
- UCO – Clayton Creasey 3-yard run (Bradley Thao kick), 3:32. Bronchos 14–0. Drive: 8 plays, 49 yards, 3:13.

Second quarter

- UCO – Andrew Carney 2-yard run (Bradley Thao kick), 9:48. Bronchos 21–0. Drive: 11 plays, 80 yards, 4:06.
- UCO – Dev Mathews 3-yard run (Bradley Thao kick), 7:16. Bronchos 28–0. Drive: 4 plays, 22 yards, 1:38.
- UCO – Javohn Thomas 17-yard pass from Jett Huff (Bradley Thao kick), 1:07. Bronchos 35–0. Drive: 9 plays, 80 yards, 4:10.

Third quarter

- TXW – Ian Jernagin 1-yard run (Christian Munguia kick), 13:35. Bronchos 35–7. Drive: 3 plays, 16 yards, 1:08.
- UCO – Bryant Coley 39-yard fumble return (Bradley Thao kick), 6:13. Bronchos 42–7.
- UCO – Andrew Carney 1-yard run (Bradley Thao kick), 2:05. Bronchos 49–7. Drive: 7 plays, 57 yards, 3:11.

Fourth quarter

- UCO – Bradley Thao 32-yard field goal, 11:50. Bronchos 52–7. Drive: 9 plays, 53 yards, 3:56.
- UCO – Tahkari Bethel 17-yard pass from Clayton Creasey (Ethan Spiwak kick), 9:06. Bronchos 59–7. Drive: 3 plays, 12 yards, 0:41.

| Statistics | UCO | TXW |
|---|---|---|
| First downs | 25 | 18 |
| Total yards | 498 | 262 |
| Rushing yards | 134 | 154 |
| Passing yards | 364 | 108 |
| Turnovers | 2 | 2 |
| Time of possession | 28:11 | 31:49 |

| Team | Category | Player | Statistics |
|---|---|---|---|
| Central Oklahoma | Passing | Jett Huff | 21/28, 302 yards, 2 TD |
| Central Oklahoma | Rushing | Jadaniel Nettles | 5 rushes, 37 yards |
| Central Oklahoma | Receiving | Makel Paiva | 6 receptions, 105 yards |
| Texas Wesleyan | Passing | Charlie Adamoli | 8/22, 75 yards |
| Texas Wesleyan | Rushing | Ian Jernagin | 16 rushes, 90 yards, TD |
| Texas Wesleyan | Receiving | Sean Smith | 3 receptions, 29 yards |

=== At Central Arkansas (FCS) ===
Central Oklahoma Bronchos at Central Arkansas Bears (FCS) – Game summary

| Quarter | 1 | 2 | 3 | 4 | Total |
|---|---|---|---|---|---|
| Bronchos | 0 | 10 | 0 | 10 | 20 |
| Bears (FCS) | 10 | 14 | 21 | 14 | 59 |

at Estes Stadium, Conway, Arkansas

- Date: September 12
- Game time: 6:00 p.m. CDT
- Game weather: Sunny
- Game attendance: 6,743
- Referee: Bradley Eiras
- Box score, Recap

Game information
First quarter
- CARK – Caleb Jones 33-yard field goal, 7:26. Bears 3–0. Drive: 10 plays, 88 yards, 5:33.
- CARK – Donovyn Omolo 9-yard run (Caleb Jones kick), 3:32. Bears 10–0. Drive: 7 plays, 56 yards, 2:20.

Second quarter

- UCO – Andrew Carney 3-yard pass from Jett Huff (Bradley Thao kick), 14:02. Bears 10–7. Drive: 10 plays, 75 yards, 4:30.
- CARK – Ty Durham 21-yard pass from Donovyn Omolo (Caleb Jones kick), 13:07. Bears 17–7. Drive: 2 plays, 92 yards, 0:48.
- CARK – Cameron Young 2-yard run (Caleb Jones kick), 5:59. Bears 24–7. Drive: 8 plays, 44 yards, 3:59.
- UCO – Bradley Thao 23-yard field goal, 0:02. Bears 24–10. Drive: 6 plays, 74 yards, 2:09.

Third quarter

- CARK – Jalen Washington 71-yard run (Caleb Jones kick), 14:06. Bears 31–10. Drive: 1 play, 71 yards, 0:12.
- CARK – Bryson Adamoh 29-yard interception return (Caleb Jones kick), 13:32. Bears 38–10.
- CARK – Dakarai Anderson 6-yard pass from Donovyn Omolo (Caleb Jones kick), 9:26. Bears 45–10. Drive: 6 plays, 44 yards, 2:39.

Fourth quarter

- UCO – Matthew Ciers blocked punt recovered in end zone (Bradley Thao kick), 14:05. Bears 45–17.
- CARK – Ty Durham 4-yard pass from Tyler Dudden (Caleb Jones kick), 8:58. Bears 52–17. Drive: 8 plays, 75 yards, 5:07.
- CARK – Enoch Assan 56-yard run (Caleb Jones kick), 6:08. Bears 59–17. Drive: 1 play, 56 yards, 0:14.
- UCO – Bradley Thao 37-yard field goal, 3:01. Bears 59–20. Drive: 7 plays, 45 yards, 3:05.

| Statistics | UCO | CARK |
|---|---|---|
| First downs | 18 | 20 |
| Total yards | 320 | 544 |
| Rushing yards | 32 | 407 |
| Passing yards | 288 | 137 |
| Turnovers | 6 | 0 |
| Time of possession | 28:39 | 31:21 |

| Team | Category | Player | Statistics |
|---|---|---|---|
| Central Oklahoma | Passing | Jett Huff | 17/27, 199 yards, TD, 3 INT |
| Central Oklahoma | Rushing | Dev Matthews | 5 rushes, 49 yards |
| Central Oklahoma | Receiving | Tahkari Bethel | 5 receptions, 105 yards |
| Central Arkansas | Passing | Donovyn Omolo | 11/15, 133 yards, 2 TD |
| Central Arkansas | Rushing | Jalen Washington | 12 rushes, 202 yards, TD |
| Central Arkansas | Receiving | Tyrell Pollard | 3 receptions, 79 yards |

=== At Washburn ===
Central Oklahoma Bronchos at Washburn Ichabods – Game summary

| Quarter | 1 | 2 | 3 | 4 | Total |
|---|---|---|---|---|---|
| Bronchos | 0 | 3 | 7 | 0 | 10 |
| Ichabods | 0 | 7 | 7 | 0 | 14 |

at Yager Stadium at Moore Bowl, Topeka, Kansas

- Date: September 19
- Game time: 11:00 a.m. CDT
- Game weather: Sunny • Temperature: 90 °F (32 °C) • Wind: N 15 mph
- Game attendance: 3,750
- Referee: Phil Lombardi
- Box score, Recap

Game information
First quarter
- No scoring plays

Second quarter

- WASH – Quinton Renfro 2-yard run (Aidan Battle kick), 11:57. Ichabods 7–0. Drive: 4 plays, 16 yards, 1:11.
- UCO – Bradley Thao 30-yard field goal, 2:29. Ichabods 7–3. Drive: 12 plays, 50 yards, 5:43.

Third quarter

- WASH – Nathan Lewis Jr. 22-yard pass from Logan Madden (Aidan Battle kick), 10:47. Ichabods 14–3. Drive: 9 plays, 75 yards, 4:13.
- UCO – Jett Huff 9-yard run (Bradley Thao kick), 2:04. Ichabods 14–10. Drive: 13 plays, 71 yards, 3:48.

Fourth quarter

- No scoring plays

| Statistics | UCO | WASH |
|---|---|---|
| First downs | 20 | 15 |
| Total yards | 359 | 202 |
| Rushing yards | 88 | 101 |
| Passing yards | 271 | 101 |
| Turnovers | 4 | 2 |
| Time of possession | 33:13 | 26:47 |

| Team | Category | Player | Statistics |
|---|---|---|---|
| Central Oklahoma | Passing | Jett Huff | 27/42, 271 yards, INT |
| Central Oklahoma | Rushing | Jett Huff | 14 rushes, 46 yards, TD |
| Central Oklahoma | Receiving | Tahkari Bethel | 7 receptions, 99 yards |
| Washburn | Passing | Logan Madden | 11/25, 101 yards, TD, INT |
| Washburn | Rushing | Cam Robinson | 14 rushes, 41 yards |
| Washburn | Receiving | Tre Calhoun | 3 receptions, 33 yards |

=== No. 7 Northwest Missouri State ===
No. 7 Northwest Missouri State Bearcats at Central Oklahoma Bronchos – Game summary

| Quarter | 1 | 2 | 3 | 4 | Total |
|---|---|---|---|---|---|
| No. 7 Bearcats | 14 | 0 | 0 | 0 | 14 |
| Bronchos | 7 | 6 | 3 | 3 | 19 |

at Chad Richison Stadium, Edmond, Oklahoma

- Date: September 26
- Game time: 7:00 p.m. CDT
- Game weather: Sunny
- Game attendance: 8,474
- Referee: Dwight Neibling
- Box score, Recap

Game information
First quarter
- NWM – Jaidyn Doss 32-yard pass from Zechariah Owens (Mo Alwaely kick), 10:34. Bearcats 7–0. Drive: 10 plays, 75 yards, 4:26.
- UCO – Makel Paiva 28-yard pass from Jett Huff (Bradley Thao kick), 8:40. Tied 7–7. Drive: 4 plays, 75 yards, 1:54.
- NWM – Quincy Torry 4-yard run (Mo Alwaely kick), 5:08. Bearcats 14–7. Drive: 8 plays, 75 yards, 3:32.

Second quarter

- UCO – Bradley Thao 46-yard field goal, 3:34. Bearcats 14–10. Drive: 12 plays, 55 yards, 6:58.
- UCO – Bradley Thao 22-yard field goal, 0:00. Bearcats 14–13. Drive: 4 plays, 8 yards, 0:50.

Third quarter

- UCO – Bradley Thao 27-yard field goal, 6:58. Bronchos 16–14. Drive: 7 plays, 14 yards, 2:13.

Fourth quarter

- UCO – Bradley Thao 23-yard field goal, 4:37. Bronchos 19–14. Drive: 7 plays, 32 yards, 4:10.

| Statistics | NWM | UCO |
|---|---|---|
| First downs | 16 | 17 |
| Total yards | 272 | 336 |
| Rushing yards | 134 | 161 |
| Passing yards | 138 | 175 |
| Turnovers | 4 | 1 |
| Time of possession | 25:30 | 34:30 |

| Team | Category | Player | Statistics |
|---|---|---|---|
| Northwest Missouri State | Passing | Zechariah Owens | 7/13, 90 yards, TD, 2 INT |
| Northwest Missouri State | Rushing | Quincy Torry | 19 rushes, 110 yards, TD |
| Northwest Missouri State | Receiving | Erwin Nash | 3 receptions, 43 yards |
| Central Oklahoma | Passing | Jett Huff | 20/36, 175 yards, TD, INT |
| Central Oklahoma | Rushing | Jadaniel Nettles | 18 rushes, 114 yards |
| Central Oklahoma | Receiving | Makel Paiva | 5 receptions, 45 yards, TD |

=== At Central Missouri ===
Central Oklahoma Bronchos at Central Missouri Mules – Game summary

| Quarter | 1 | 2 | 3 | 4 | Total |
|---|---|---|---|---|---|
| Bronchos | 14 | 3 | 0 | 14 | 31 |
| Mules | 6 | 7 | 7 | 13 | 33 |

at Audrey J. Walton Stadium, Warrensburg, Missouri

- Date: October 3
- Game time: 7:00 p.m. CDT
- Game weather: Clear • Temperature: 68 °F (20 °C) • Wind: E 3 mph
- Game attendance: 6,432
- Box score, Recap

Game information
First quarter
- UCO – Makel Paiva 4-yard pass from Jett Huff (Bradley Thao kick), 11:18. Bronchos 7–0. Drive: 6 plays, 35 yards, 2:56.
- UCM – Trevor Garlington 47-yard pass from Jordan Pachot (kick failed), 9:33. Bronchos 7–6. Drive: 3 plays, 83 yards, 1:40.
- UCO – Clayton Creasey 1-yard run (Bradley Thao kick), 0:09. Bronchos 14–6. Drive: 13 plays, 70 yards, 7:17.

Second quarter

- UCO – Bradley Thao 22-yard field goal, 10:17. Bronchos 17–6. Drive: 10 plays, 76 yards, 4:13.
- UCM – Damien Brown 1-yard run (Will Peacock kick), 0:30. Bronchos 17–13. Drive: 4 plays, 80 yards, 1:09.

Third quarter

- UCM – Damien Brown 4-yard run (Colton Brunke Brown kick), 1:00. Mules 20–17. Drive: 8 plays, 96 yards, 3:21.

Fourth quarter

- UCM – Damien Brown 18-yard run (Colton Brunke Brown kick), 13:42. Mules 27–17. Drive: 6 plays, 40 yards, 1:33.
- UCO – Zayden Martinez 28-yard pass from Jett Huff (Bradley Thao kick), 12:11. Mules 27–24. Drive: 4 plays, 39 yards, 1:20.
- UCM – Colton Brunke Brown 46-yard field goal, 4:57. Mules 30–24. Drive: 8 plays, 40 yards, 2:35.
- UCO – Makel Paiva 11-yard pass from Jett Huff (Bradley Thao kick), 3:25. Bronchos 31–30. Drive: 4 plays, 48 yards, 1:17.
- UCM – Colton Brunke Brown 19-yard field goal, 0:07. Mules 33–31. Drive: 15 plays, 84 yards, 3:13.

| Statistics | UCO | UCM |
|---|---|---|
| First downs | 23 | 27 |
| Total yards | 352 | 553 |
| Rushing yards | 73 | 103 |
| Passing yards | 279 | 450 |
| Turnovers | 1 | 2 |
| Time of possession | 30:51 | 29:09 |

| Team | Category | Player | Statistics |
|---|---|---|---|
| Central Oklahoma | Passing | Jett Huff | 28/45, 296 yards, 3 TD, INT |
| Central Oklahoma | Rushing | Dev Mathews | 10 rushes, 46 yards |
| Central Oklahoma | Receiving | Makel Paiva | 15 receptions, 131 yards, 2 TD |
| Central Missouri | Passing | Jordan Pachot | 27/45, 450 yards, TD, INT |
| Central Missouri | Rushing | Damien Brown | 20 rushes, 93 yards, 3 TD |
| Central Missouri | Receiving | Jack Pospisil | 7 receptions, 88 yards |

=== Fort Hays State ===
Fort Hays State Tigers at Central Oklahoma Bronchos – Game summary

| Quarter | 1 | 2 | 3 | 4 | Total |
|---|---|---|---|---|---|
| Tigers | 3 | 0 | 7 | 0 | 10 |
| Bronchos | 3 | 14 | 0 | 14 | 31 |

at Chad Richison Stadium, Edmond, Oklahoma

- Date: October 10
- Game time: 7:00 p.m. CDT
- Game weather: Clear • Temperature: 80 °F (27 °C) • Wind: S 10 mph
- Game attendance: 4,314
- Referee: Brian Stelzer
- Box score, Recap

Game information
First quarter
- UCO – Bradley Thao 22-yard field goal, 10:37. Bronchos 3–0. Drive: 11 plays, 70 yards, 4:23.
- FHS – Zane Colson 41-yard field goal, 4:50. Tied 3–3. Drive: 10 plays, 46 yards, 5:41.

Second quarter

- UCO – C. J. Williams 11-yard pass from Jett Huff (Bradley Thao kick), 10:45. Bronchos 10–3. Drive: 1 play, 11 yards, 0:06.
- UCO – Dev Mathews 5-yard run (Bradley Thao kick), 1:01. Bronchos 17–3. Drive: 11 plays, 90 yards, 3:59.

Third quarter

- FHS – A. G. Floyd 1-yard run (Zane Colson kick), 3:15. Bronchos 17–10. Drive: 11 plays, 70 yards, 7:09.

Fourth quarter

- UCO – Reese Roller 75-yard fumble return (Bradley Thao kick), 4:33. Bronchos 24–10.
- UCO – Dev Mathews 36-yard run (Bradley Thao kick), 2:22. Bronchos 31–10. Drive: 3 plays, 45 yards, 1:11.

| Statistics | FHS | UCO |
|---|---|---|
| First downs | 20 | 16 |
| Total yards | 295 | 277 |
| Rushing yards | 138 | 84 |
| Passing yards | 157 | 193 |
| Turnovers | 4 | 0 |
| Time of possession | 40:00 | 20:00 |

| Team | Category | Player | Statistics |
|---|---|---|---|
| Fort Hays State | Passing | Major Cantrell | 14/24, 157 yards, 2 INT |
| Fort Hays State | Rushing | LaAngelo Bell | 21 rushes, 63 yards |
| Fort Hays State | Receiving | Kolton Coleman | 4 receptions, 84 yards |
| Central Oklahoma | Passing | Jett Huff | 19/29, 193 yards, TD |
| Central Oklahoma | Rushing | Dev Mathews | 10 rushes, 90 yards, 2 TD |
| Central Oklahoma | Receiving | C. J. Williams | 4 receptions, 50 yards, TD |

=== At No. 8 Emporia State ===
Central Oklahoma Bronchos at No. 8 Emporia State Hornets – Game summary

| Quarter | 1 | 2 | 3 | 4 | Total |
|---|---|---|---|---|---|
| Bronchos | 0 | 9 | 0 | 7 | 16 |
| No. 8 Hornets | 7 | 0 | 13 | 3 | 23 |

at Francis G. Welch Stadium, Emporia, Kansas

- Date: October 17
- Game time: 1:00 p.m. CDT
- Game weather: Sunny
- Game attendance: 3,953
- Referee: Manu Preston
- Box score, Recap

Game information
First quarter
- ESU – Victor Chionuma 44-yard run (Brandon McCary kick), 5:44. Hornets 7–0. Drive: 2 plays, 51 yards, 0:24.

Second quarter

- UCO – Team safety, 11:18. Hornets 7–2.
- UCO – Javohn Thomas 4-yard pass from Cruz Campbell (Bradley Thao kick), 9:47. Bronchos 9–7. Drive: 6 plays, 65 yards, 1:24.

Third quarter

- ESU – Carson Sippel 15-yard fumble return (kick blocked), 11:06. Hornets 13–9.
- ESU – Corey Turner II 44-yard pass from Ben Harris (Brandon McCary kick), 9:19. Hornets 20–9. Drive: 2 plays, 53 yards, 0:21.

Fourth quarter

- ESU – Brandon McCary 40-yard field goal, 7:24. Hornets 23–9. Drive: 11 plays, 23 yards, 4:20.
- UCO – Javohn Thomas 12-yard pass from Cruz Campbell (Bradley Thao kick), 2:03. Hornets 23–16. Drive: 6 plays, 39 yards, 2:13.

| Statistics | UCO | ESU |
|---|---|---|
| First downs | 20 | 12 |
| Total yards | 323 | 211 |
| Rushing yards | 60 | 83 |
| Passing yards | 263 | 128 |
| Turnovers | 4 | 1 |
| Time of possession | 35:04 | 24:56 |

| Team | Category | Player | Statistics |
|---|---|---|---|
| Central Oklahoma | Passing | Cruz Campbell | 19/37, 177 yards, 2 TD, 2 INT |
| Central Oklahoma | Rushing | Jadaniel Nettles | 16 rushes, 42 yards |
| Central Oklahoma | Receiving | Tahkari Bethel | 4 receptions, 76 yards |
| Emporia State | Passing | Ben Harris | 5/14, 64 yards, TD |
| Emporia State | Rushing | Victor Chionuma | 5 rushes, 46 yards, TD |
| Emporia State | Receiving | Corey Turner II | 2 receptions, 54 yards, TD |

=== At Pittsburg State ===
Central Oklahoma Bronchos at Pittsburg State Gorillas – Game summary

| Quarter | 1 | 2 | 3 | 4 | Total |
|---|---|---|---|---|---|
| Bronchos | 7 | 0 | 7 | 0 | 14 |
| Gorillas | 0 | 21 | 14 | 17 | 52 |

at Carnie Smith Stadium, Pittsburg, Kansas

- Date: October 24
- Game time: 2:00 p.m. CDT
- Game weather: Cloudy • Temperature: 76 °F (24 °C) • Wind: SW 9 mph
- Game attendance: 5,542
- Referee: John Adams
- Box score, Recap

Game information
First quarter
- UCO – Jadaniel Nettles 8-yard run (Bradley Thao kick), 9:35. Bronchos 7–0. Drive: 8 plays, 69 yards, 4:30.

Second quarter

- PSU – Bobby Bacon 1-yard run (Austin Schmitt kick), 12:33. Tied 7–7. Drive: 5 plays, 15 yards, 2:27.
- PSU – Kuron Parchmon 29-yard pass from Bobby Bacon (Austin Schmitt kick), 5:57. Gorillas 14–7. Drive: 3 plays, 69 yards, 1:17.
- PSU – T. J. Starks 24-yard pass from Bobby Bacon (Austin Schmitt kick), 0:44. Gorillas 21–7. Drive: 9 plays, 84 yards, 3:06.

Third quarter

- PSU – Kuron Parchmon 21-yard pass from Bobby Bacon (Austin Schmitt kick), 12:33. Gorillas 28–7. Drive: 4 plays, 49 yards, 1:35.
- PSU – P. J. Wallace 1-yard run (Austin Schmitt kick), 9:19. Gorillas 35–7. Drive: 6 plays, 22 yards, 3:14.
- UCO – Andrew Carney 30-yard pass from Owen Jones (Bradley Thao kick), 7:25. Gorillas 35–14. Drive: 1 play, 30 yards, 0:07.

Fourth quarter

- PSU – Austin Schmitt 26-yard field goal, 14:15. Gorillas 38–14. Drive: 11 plays, 72 yards, 4:58.
- PSU – Quintin Kirby 44-yard interception return (Austin Schmitt kick), 12:49. Gorillas 45–14.
- PSU – Brayden Christian 3-yard run (Austin Schmitt kick), 4:24. Gorillas 52–14. Drive: 11 plays, 83 yards, 7:25.

| Statistics | UCO | PSU |
|---|---|---|
| First downs | 18 | 29 |
| Total yards | 314 | 442 |
| Rushing yards | 104 | 131 |
| Passing yards | 210 | 311 |
| Turnovers | 4 | 2 |
| Time of possession | 23:09 | 36:51 |

| Team | Category | Player | Statistics |
|---|---|---|---|
| Central Oklahoma | Passing | Cruz Campbell | 11/17, 139 yards |
| Central Oklahoma | Rushing | Jadaniel Nettles | 15 rushes, 69 yards, TD |
| Central Oklahoma | Receiving | Andrew Carney | 7 receptions, 119 yards, TD |
| Pittsburg State | Passing | Bobby Bacon | 21/28, 301 yards, 3 TD |
| Pittsburg State | Rushing | P. J. Wallace | 14 rushes, 47 yards, TD |
| Pittsburg State | Receiving | Greyson Holbert | 7 receptions, 90 yards |

=== Nebraska–Kearney ===
Nebraska–Kearney Lopers at Central Oklahoma Bronchos – Game summary

| Quarter | 1 | 2 | 3 | 4 | Total |
|---|---|---|---|---|---|
| Lopers | 3 | 0 | 3 | 0 | 6 |
| Bronchos | 10 | 21 | 0 | 0 | 31 |

at Chad Richison Stadium, Edmond, Oklahoma

- Date: October 31
- Game time: 1:00 p.m. CDT
- Game weather: Cloudy • Temperature: 65 °F (18 °C) • Wind: S 5 mph
- Game attendance: 1,992
- Referee: Phil Lombardi
- Box score, Recap

Game information
First quarter
- UCO – Bradley Thao 22-yard field goal, 10:28. Bronchos 3–0. Drive: 10 plays, 77 yards, 4:26.
- UCO – Makel Paiva 5-yard pass from Owen Jones (Bradley Thao kick), 7:36. Bronchos 10–0. Drive: 5 plays, 43 yards, 1:25.
- UNK – Kaden Kiernan 46-yard field goal, 4:08. Bronchos 10–3. Drive: 8 plays, 65 yards, 3:21.

Second quarter

- UCO – Jadaniel Nettles 2-yard run (Bradley Thao kick), 10:37. Bronchos 17–3. Drive: 11 plays, 95 yards, 5:11.
- UCO – Tahkari Bethel 59-yard pass from Owen Jones (Bradley Thao kick), 6:17. Bronchos 24–3. Drive: 5 plays, 69 yards, 2:30.
- UCO – Tahkari Bethel 22-yard pass from Owen Jones (Bradley Thao kick), 1:55. Bronchos 31–3. Drive: 6 plays, 60 yards, 2:20.

Third quarter

- UNK – Kaden Kiernan 30-yard field goal, 6:24. Bronchos 31–6. Drive: 7 plays, 9 yards, 2:57.

Fourth quarter

- No scoring plays

| Statistics | UNK | UCO |
|---|---|---|
| First downs | 15 | 18 |
| Total yards | 259 | 408 |
| Rushing yards | 183 | 186 |
| Passing yards | 76 | 222 |
| Turnovers | 0 | 2 |
| Time of possession | 34:18 | 25:42 |

| Team | Category | Player | Statistics |
|---|---|---|---|
| Nebraska–Kearney | Passing | Ziggy Harper | 11/25, 76 yards |
| Nebraska–Kearney | Rushing | Ziggy Harper | 21 rushes, 85 yards |
| Nebraska–Kearney | Receiving | Derek Jones | 1 reception, 18 yards |
| Central Oklahoma | Passing | Owen Jones | 16/30, 222 yards, 3 TD |
| Central Oklahoma | Rushing | Jadaniel Nettles | 18 rushes, 90 yards, TD |
| Central Oklahoma | Receiving | Tahkari Bethel | 5 receptions, 112 yards, 2 TD |

=== At Missouri Southern ===
Central Oklahoma Bronchos at Missouri Southern Lions – Game summary

| Quarter | 1 | 2 | 3 | 4 | Total |
|---|---|---|---|---|---|
| Bronchos | 0 | 11 | 3 | 0 | 14 |
| Lions | 13 | 3 | 0 | 7 | 23 |

at Fred G. Hughes Stadium, Joplin, Missouri

- Date: November 7
- Game time: 1:00 p.m. CST
- Game weather: Cloudy • Temperature: 52 °F (11 °C) • Wind: E 2 mph
- Game attendance: 1,267
- Referee: Manu Preston
- Box score, Recap

Game information
First quarter
- MSS – Asher Huffman 27-yard field goal, 7:31. Lions 3–0. Drive: 16 plays, 66 yards, 7:22.
- MSS – Keylan Mitchell 20-yard fumble return (Asher Huffman kick), 6:39. Lions 10–0.
- MSS – Asher Huffman 20-yard field goal, 0:38. Lions 13–0. Drive: 7 plays, 15 yards, 3:22.

Second quarter

- MSS – Asher Huffman 31-yard field goal, 9:39. Lions 16–0. Drive: 10 plays, 62 yards, 5:21.
- UCO – Marquise Harris 7-yard run (OWen Jones pass to Makel Pavia), 5:01. Lions 16–8. Drive: 12 plays, 75 yards, 4:38.
- UCO – Bradley Thao 26-yard field goal, 0:33. Lions 16–11. Drive: 11 plays, 59 yards, 3:24.

Third quarter

- UCO – Bradley Thao 30-yard field goal, 12:52. Lions 16–14. Drive: 7 plays, 62 yards, 2:08.

Fourth quarter

- MSS – Narkel LeFlore 5-yard run (Asher Huffman kick), 11:42. Lions 23–14. Drive: 4 plays, 17 yards, 2:01.

| Statistics | UCO | MSS |
|---|---|---|
| First downs | 21 | 13 |
| Total yards | 305 | 230 |
| Rushing yards | 123 | 126 |
| Passing yards | 182 | 104 |
| Turnovers | 3 | 0 |
| Time of possession | 24:44 | 35:16 |

| Team | Category | Player | Statistics |
|---|---|---|---|
| Central Oklahoma | Passing | Owen Jones | 12/28, 164 yards, 2 INT |
| Central Oklahoma | Rushing | Jadaniel Nettles | 22 rushes, 97 yards |
| Central Oklahoma | Receiving | Makel Pavia | 6 receptions, 74 yards |
| Missouri Southern | Passing | Tillman Martin | 12/24, 104 yards |
| Missouri Southern | Rushing | Narkel LeFlore | 12 rushes, 52 yards, TD |
| Missouri Southern | Receiving | Isaiah Padello | 4 receptions, 44 yards |

=== Missouri Western ===
Missouri Western Griffons at Central Oklahoma Bronchos – Game summary

| Quarter | 1 | 2 | 3 | 4 | OT | Total |
|---|---|---|---|---|---|---|
| Griffons | 0 | 7 | 7 | 10 | 0 | 24 |
| Bronchos | 0 | 17 | 0 | 7 | 6 | 30 |

at Chad Richison Stadium, Edmond, Oklahoma

- Date: November 14
- Game time: 1:00 p.m. CST
- Game weather: Sunny • Temperature: 60 °F (16 °C) • Wind: S 10 mph
- Game attendance: 5,227
- Referee: Brian Stelzer
- Box score

Game information
First quarter
- No scoring plays

Second quarter

- UCO – Zane Zielny 11-yard pass from Jett Huff (Bradley Thao kick), 5:03. Bronchos 7–0. Drive: 1 play, 16 yards, 0:10.
- UCO – Darren Nickerson 11-yard pass from Jett Huff (Bradley Thao kick), 2:57. Bronchos 14–0. Drive: 1 play, 11 yards, 0:05.
- MWS – Victor Taylor Jr. 84-yard pass from Isaiah Tate (Latrell Armstrong kick), 1:57. Bronchos 14–7. Drive: 3 plays, 89 yards, 0:53.
- UCO – Bradley Thao 30-yard field goal, 0:00. Bronchos 17–7. Drive: 9 plays, 61 yards, 1:57.

Third quarter

- MWS – Isaiah Tate 2-yard run (Latrell Armstrong kick), 3:25. Bronchos 17–14. Drive: 3 plays, 36 yards, 1:16.

Fourth quarter

- UCO – Clayton Creasey 1-yard run (Bradley Thao kick), 14:56. Bronchos 24–14. Drive: 3 plays, 39 yards, 1:06.
- MWS – Crew Myers 2-yard pass from Isaiah Tate (Latrell Armstrong kick), 7:15. Bronchos 24–21. Drive: 9 plays, 67 yards, 4:18.
- MWS – Latrell Armstrong 33-yard field goal, 4:25. Tied 24–24. Drive: 4 plays, 7 yards, 1:31.

Overtime

- UCO – Jadaniel Nettles 3-yard run (kick blocked). Bronchos 30–24. Drive: 7 plays, 25 yards.

| Statistics | MWS | UCO |
|---|---|---|
| First downs | 17 | 15 |
| Total yards | 294 | 353 |
| Rushing yards | 25 | 147 |
| Passing yards | 269 | 206 |
| Turnovers | 3 | 2 |
| Time of possession | 33:04 | 26:56 |

| Team | Category | Player | Statistics |
|---|---|---|---|
| Missouri Western | Passing | Isaiah Tate | 19/36, 261 yards, 2 TD, 2 INT |
| Missouri Western | Rushing | Peyton Hatfield | 1 rush, 15 yards |
| Missouri Western | Receiving | Crew Myers | 10 receptions, 94 yards, TD |
| Central Oklahoma | Passing | Jett Huff | 21/41, 206 yards, 2 TD |
| Central Oklahoma | Rushing | Jadaniel Nettles | 23 rushes, 78 yards, TD |
| Central Oklahoma | Receiving | Zayden Martinez | 5 receptions, 87 yards |
