= Moses Harper =

American football coach (born c. 1987)

Biographical details
- Born: c. 1987 (age 38–39); McComb, Mississippi, U.S.
- Education: Central Methodist University (2010)

Playing career

Football
- 2008–2009: Central Methodist
- 2010: Wichita Wild

Men's basketball
- 2006–2007: North Central Missouri
- 2008–2009: Central Methodist
- Position: Wide receiver

Coaching career (HC unless noted)

Football
- 2010: Central Methodist (SA)
- 2011: Highland (KS) (WR)
- 2012–2013: Fort Scott (WR)
- 2014–2015: Fort Scott (OC)
- 2016–2018: Coahoma (OC/WR)
- 2019–2021: William Jewell (OL)
- 2022: Missouri Western (TE)
- 2023: Nebraska–Kearney (WR)
- 2024–2026: Lincoln (MO)

Head coaching record
- Overall: 5–27

Moses Harper (born c. 1987) is an American college football coach. He was the head football coach at Lincoln University from 2024 to 2026. He also coached for Central Methodist, Highland Community College (KS), Fort Scott Community College, Coahoma Community College, William Jewell, Missouri Western, and Nebraska–Kearney. He played college football for Central Methodist and professionally for the Wichita Wild of the Indoor Football League (IFL) as a wide receiver. He played college basketball for North Central Missouri College and Central Methodist.

== Head coaching record ==
Year	Team	Overall	Conference	Standing	Bowl/playoffs
Lincoln Blue Tigers (Great Lakes Valley Conference) (2024–2026)
2024	Lincoln	1–10	0–8	9th	
2025	Lincoln	2–9	0–8	9th	
2026	Lincoln	2–8	1–7	9th	
Lincoln:		5–27	1–23		
Total:		5–27			
