= Gary Bass (American football) =

American football coach

Current position
- Title: Head coach
- Team: UVA Wise
- Conference: SAC
- Record: 5–15

Biographical details
- Born: c. 1983 or 1984 (age 42–43); Marion, North Carolina, U.S.
- Education: Catawba College (2006)

Playing career
- 2002–2005: Catawba
- Position: Offensive lineman

Coaching career (HC unless noted)
- 2006–2008: East Rowan HS (NC) (AHC/OC/OL)
- 2009–2010: Missouri Southern (OL)
- 2011–2016: Quincy (OC/OL/TE)
- 2017–2023: Quincy
- 2024–present: UVA Wise

Head coaching record
- Overall: 31–57

Gary Bass (born c. 1983 or 1984) is an American college football coach. He is the head football coach for the University of Virginia's College at Wise, a position he has held since 2024. He was the head football coach for Quincy University from 2017 to 2023. He also coached for East Rowan High School and Missouri Southern. He played college football for Catawba as an offensive lineman.

== Head coaching record ==
Year	Team	Overall	Conference	Standing	Bowl/playoffs
Quincy Hawks (Great Lakes Valley Conference) (2017–2023)
2017	Quincy	3–8	1–6	7th	
2018	Quincy	4–7	3–4	5th	
2019	Quincy	5–6	2–5	6th	
2020–21	Quincy	0–2	0–2	3rd (East)	
2021	Quincy	4–7	2–5	7th	
2022	Quincy	4–7	1–5	T–6th	
2023	Quincy	6–5	3–4	T–5th	
Quincy:		26–42	12–31		
UVA Wise Cavaliers (South Atlantic Conference) (2024–present)
2024	UVA Wise	4–6	2–5	4th (Mountain)	
2025	UVA Wise	1–9	1–8	9th	
2026	UVA Wise	0–0	0–0		
UVA Wise:		5–15	3–13		
Total:		31–57			
