= Gregg Nesbitt =

American football coach (born c. 1958)

Current position
- Title: Head coach
- Team: Kirksville HS (MO)
- Record: 9–1

Biographical details
- Born: c. 1958 (age 67–68); Hannibal, Missouri, U.S.
- Education: Truman State University (1980, 1987)

Playing career
- 1976–1979: Truman
- Position: Running back

Coaching career (HC unless noted)
- 1984–1989: Hannibal HS (MO)
- 1990–1992: Truman State (DC/LB)
- 1993–2005: Hickman HS (MO)
- 2006: Central Methodist (DC/DB)
- 2007–2009: Central Missouri (DC)
- 2010–2023: Truman State
- 2024–present: Kirksville HS (MO)

Head coaching record
- Overall: 89–59 (college); 50–6 [data missing] (high school)
- Bowls: 3–0

Accomplishments and honors

Championships
- 1 GLVC (2016); 1 GLVC West Division (2020)

Awards
- GLVC co-Coach of the Year (2022); Missouri Football Coaches Association Hall of Fame (2010)

Gregg Nesbitt (born c. 1958) is an American former college football coach. He is the head football coach for Kirksville High School, a position he has held since 2024. He was the head football coach for Hannibal High School from 1984 to 1989, for Hickman High School from 1993 to 2005, and for Truman State University from 2010 to 2023. He also coached for Central Methodist and Central Missouri. He played college football for Truman as a running back.

== Personal life ==
Nesbitt's son, Kellen, is the head football coach for Truman State University.

== Head coaching record ==
=== College ===
Year	Team	Overall	Conference	Standing	Bowl/playoffs	AFCA^{#}
Truman Bulldogs (Mid-America Intercollegiate Athletics Association) (2010–2012)
2010	Truman	4–7	2–7	T–8th		
2011	Truman	4–7	2–7	T–8th		
2012	Truman	4–7	3–7	11th		
Truman Bulldogs (Great Lakes Valley Conference) (2013–2023)
2013	Truman	7–4	5–2	T–2nd		
2014	Truman	6–4	5–3	T–2nd		
2015	Truman	5–6	4–4	T–4th		
2016	Truman	8–3	7–1	T–1st		
2017	Truman	5–6	4–3	T–4th		
2018	Truman	6–5	5–2	3rd		
2019	Truman	10–2	5–2	3rd	W America's Crossroads	
2020–21	Truman	3–1	3–0	1st (West)		
2021	Truman	9–3	4–3	T–3rd	W America's Crossroads	
2022	Truman	9–2	5–1	2nd	W America's Crossroads	25
2023	Truman	9–2	5–1	T–2nd		
Truman:		89–59	59–44			
Total:		89–59				
National championship Conference title Conference division title or championship game berth

=== High school ===
[data missing]

Year	Team	Overall	Conference	Standing	Bowl/playoffs
Hannibal High School (North Central Missouri Conference) (1984–1989)
1989	Hannibal	11–1	5–0		
Hannibal:		11–1	5–0		
Hickman High School () (1993–2005)
1999	Hickman	2–1	0–0		
2000	Hickman	5–1	0–0		
2001	Hickman	3–1	0–0		
2002	Hickman	2–0	0–0		
2003	Hickman	3–0	0–0		
2004	Hickman	11–1	0–0		W MSHSAA Class 6 State Championship
2005	Hickman	4–0	0–0		
Hickman:		30–4	0–0		
Kirksville High School (North Central Missouri Conference) (2024–present)
2024	Kirksville	9–1	5–1		
Kirksville:		9–1	5–1		
Total:		50–6			
National championship Conference title Conference division title or championship game berth
