= Adam Dorrel =

American football player and coach (born 1974)

Biographical details
- Born: December 2, 1974 (age 51); Maryville, Missouri, U.S.

Playing career
- 1994–1997: Northwest Missouri State
- Position: Offensive lineman

Coaching career (HC unless noted)
- 1998: Northeastern State (OK) (GA)
- 1999: Northwest Missouri State (GA)
- 2000: Dakota State (OL)
- 2001–2003: William Jewell (assistant)
- 2004–2006: Northwest Missouri State (OL)
- 2007–2010: Northwest Missouri State (OC/OL)
- 2011–2016: Northwest Missouri State
- 2017–2021: Abilene Christian
- 2022–2026: Central Oklahoma

Head coaching record
- Overall: 123–58
- Tournaments: 16–3 (NCAA D-II playoffs)

Accomplishments and honors

Championships
- 3 NCAA Division II (2013, 2015–2016); 5 MIAA (2013–2016, 2024)

Awards
- 3× AFCA NCAA Division II COY (2013, 2015–2016)

Adam Dorrel (born December 2, 1974) is an American former college football coach and player. He was most recently the head football coach for the University of Central Oklahoma, a position he held since 2022. In only his third year at the helm for UCO he led the team to its first playoff berth in over 20 years. Previously Dorrel was the head coach at Northwest Missouri State in Maryville, Missouri from 2011 to 2016, and Abilene Christian in Abilene, Texas, from 2017 to 2021. While at Northwest Missouri State he led the program to three undefeated seasons and the NCAA Division II Football Championship in 2013, 2015, and 2016.

== Early life, family, and playing career ==
Dorrel is to date the only Maryville native to coach Northwest Missouri State. He graduated from Maryville High School, where he was a two-time All-Midland Empire Conference and all-district lineman. In 1992 Dorrel was named as an all-state offensive lineman. Dorrel's great-grandfather was a fullback on Northwest's first team in 1908, and his grandfather and two great-uncles played for the team in the 1940s.

Dorrel played under Northwest's Mel Tjeerdsma during Tjeerdsma's first Northwest season in 1994 in which the Bearcats went 0–11 before Tjeerdsma began his run of seven NCAA Division II Football Championship games. He was captain of the team under Tjeerdsma in 1995, 1996 and 1997. He was Daktronics Second-Team All-America offensive lineman as a senior in 1997 (with Bearcats reaching the quarterfinals in both 1996 and 1997).

== Coaching career ==
=== Early career ===
After graduating from Northwest in 1998 he was a graduate assistant in 1998 at Northeastern State University in Oklahoma. He returned to Northwest as a graduate assistant in 1999 when Bearcats won their second national championship in 1999. He received his master's degree from Northwest in 2000. He held a position as offensive line coach at Dakota State University in 2000 and offensive coach at William Jewell College from 2001 to 2003.

In 2004, he returned to Northwest and held offensive positions as the team made five consecutive national championship appearances in 2005-2009 including a national championship in 2009 (a year in which the Bearcats averaged 42 points and 474 yards per game).

In 2007, he was named offensive coach of the United States national American football team for the 2007 IFAF World Cup (which the United States won).

=== Northwest Missouri State ===
Before the 2011 season, Tjeerdsma retired and Scott Bostwick who had been the defensive coach at Northwest was named to succeed Tjeerdsma. Dorrel was promoted to assistant coach and had planned to continue his offensive duties. Bostwick died of a heart attack on June 5, 2011. On June 23 Dorrel was named head coach. Both Bostwick and Dorrel had started affiliations with Northwest under Tjeerdsma in the first 0–11 1994 season and both coaches did not have prior head coaching positions before taking over the head coach position. The Maryville Daily Forum in applauding the appointment noted that Northwest had wanted to hire somebody familiar with the Tjeerdsma tradition rather than going outside.

=== Abilene Christian ===
After winning the 2016 Division II Championship, Dorrel announced he will be leaving the Bearcats to become head coach at Abilene Christian University.

Following a 5–6 campaign in the 2021 season, Abilene Christian relieved Dorrel of his coaching duties. Dorrel ended with an overall record of 19-32 at Abilene Christian.

=== Central Oklahoma ===
On December 5, 2021 Dorrel became the head coach of Central Oklahoma. He led the team to its first playoff berth in over 20 years in just his third season and was named Super Region III Coach of the Year in 2024.

On October 3, 2026, following a 31–33 loss to Central Missouri, Dorrel chased down and screamed at the game's officials. He had to be held back by his assistant coaches and Central Missouri coach Josh Lamberson, a former assistant under Dorrel at Abilene Christian. Two days later, on October 5, Central Oklahoma officials forced Dorrel's resignation due to the outburst.

== Head coaching record ==
Year	Team	Overall	Conference	Standing	Bowl/playoffs	AFCA^{#}	D2^{°}
Northwest Missouri State Bearcats (Mid-America Intercollegiate Athletics Association) (2011–2016)
2011	Northwest Missouri State	11–3	7–2	2nd	L NCAA Division II Quarterfinal	5	
2012	Northwest Missouri State	10–3	8–2	2nd	L NCAA Division II Second Round	10	
2013	Northwest Missouri State	15–0	10–0	1st	W NCAA Division II Championship	1	1
2014	Northwest Missouri State	10–2	10–1	T–1st	L NCAA Division II First Round	14	
2015	Northwest Missouri State	15–0	11–0	1st	W NCAA Division II Championship	1	1
2016	Northwest Missouri State	15–0	11–0	1st	W NCAA Division II Championship	1	1
Northwest Missouri State:		76–8	57–5				
Abilene Christian Wildcats (Southland Conference) (2017–2020)
2017	Abilene Christian	2–9	2–7	8th			
2018	Abilene Christian	6–5	5–4	T–4th			
2019	Abilene Christian	5–7	4–5	T–6th			
2020–21	Abilene Christian	1–5	0–0				
Abilene Christian Wildcats (Western Athletic Conference) (2021)
2021	Abilene Christian	5–6	2–2	3rd			
Abilene Christian:		19–32	13–18				
Central Oklahoma Bronchos (Mid-America Intercollegiate Athletics Association) (2022–2026)
2022	Central Oklahoma	6–5	6–5	6th			
2023	Central Oklahoma	5–6	4–6	T–7th			
2024	Central Oklahoma	11–2	8–1	1st	L NCAA Division II Second Round	9	8
2025	Central Oklahoma	6–5	6–3	3rd			
2026	Central Oklahoma	2–3 (Note: Dorrel resigned after five games)	1–2				
Central Oklahoma:		30–21	25–17				
Total:		125–61					
National championship Conference title Conference division title or championship game berth
