= Mike McGlinchey Jr. =

American football coach (born c. 1977)

Mike S McGlinchey
Current position
- Title: Assistant head coach / defensive coordinator / defensive line coach
- Team: San Diego
- Conference: PFL

Biographical details
- Born: c. 1977 (age 48–49); Salisbury, Maryland, U.S.
- Education: Towson University (1999)

Playing career
- 1995–1999: Towson
- Position: Guard / tight end

Coaching career (HC unless noted)
- 2000 (spring): New Hampshire (TE)
- 2000: Princeton (TE)
- 2001–2008: Towson (ST/RB)
- 2002–2008: Towson (ST/RB/RC)
- 2009–2010: North Carolina Central (DL)
- 2011: North Carolina Central (ST/RB)
- 2012: Las Vegas Locomotives (TE)
- 2015: Salisbury (DL)
- 2016–2017: Colorado Mines (DL)
- 2018–2019: Colorado Mines (co-DC/DL)
- 2020–2022: William Jewell
- 2023–present: San Diego (AHC/DC/DL)

Head coaching record
- Overall: 2–23

Michael S. McGlinchey (born c. 1977) is an American college football coach. He is the assistant head football coach,defensive coordinator, and defensive line coach for the University of San Diego; a position he has held since 2023. He was the head football coach for William Jewell College from 2020 to 2022. He also coached for New Hampshire, Princeton, Towson, North Carolina Central, Salisbury, Colorado Mines, and the Las Vegas Locomotives of the United Football League (UFL). He played college football for Towson as a guard and tight end.

== Personal life ==
McGlinchey's father, Mike Sr., was the head football coach for Salisbury State University—now known as Salisbury University—from 1982 to 1986, Central Connecticut State University from 1987 to 1991, and Frostburg State University from 1992 to 1995.

== Head coaching record ==
Year	Team	Overall	Conference	Standing	Bowl/playoffs
William Jewell Cardinals (Great Lakes Valley Conference) (2020–2022)
2020–21	William Jewell	0–3	0–3	4th (West)	
2021	William Jewell	0–11	0–7	8th	
2022	William Jewell	2–9	1–5	T–6th	
William Jewell:		2–23	1–15		
Total:		2–23			
