= Kellen Nesbitt =

American football coach (born c. 1984)

Current position
- Title: Head coach
- Team: Truman
- Conference: GLVC
- Record: 23–13

Biographical details
- Born: c. 1984 (age 41–42)
- Education: University of Central Missouri (2007)

Playing career
- 2003–2006: Central Missouri
- Position: Defensive back

Coaching career (HC unless noted)
- 2007–2009: Central Missouri (DB)
- 2010–2015: Truman (DC/ST)
- 2016–2023: Truman (AHC/DC/ST)
- 2024–present: Truman

Head coaching record
- Overall: 23–13
- Bowls: 1–0
- Tournaments: 0–2 (NCAA D-II playoffs)

Accomplishments and honors

Championships
- GLVC (2026)

Kellen Nesbitt (born c. 1984) is an American college football coach. He is the head football coach for Truman State University, a position he has held since 2024. He was a long-time assistant under his father, Gregg, from 2010 to 2023. He also coached and played college football for Central Missouri, playing as a defensive back.

== Personal life ==
Nesbitt's father, Gregg, was the head football coach for Truman State University from 2010 to 2023.

== Head coaching record ==
Year	Team	Overall	Conference	Standing	Bowl/playoffs
Truman Bulldogs (Great Lakes Valley Conference) (2024–present)
2024	Truman	8–4	6–2	T–2nd	W America's Crossroads
2025	Truman	8–4	7–1	2nd	L NCAA Division II First Round
2026	Truman	7–5	7–1	1st	L NCAA Division II First Round
Truman:		23–13	20–4		
Total:		23–13			
