= East Rowan High School =

American public school in North Carolina

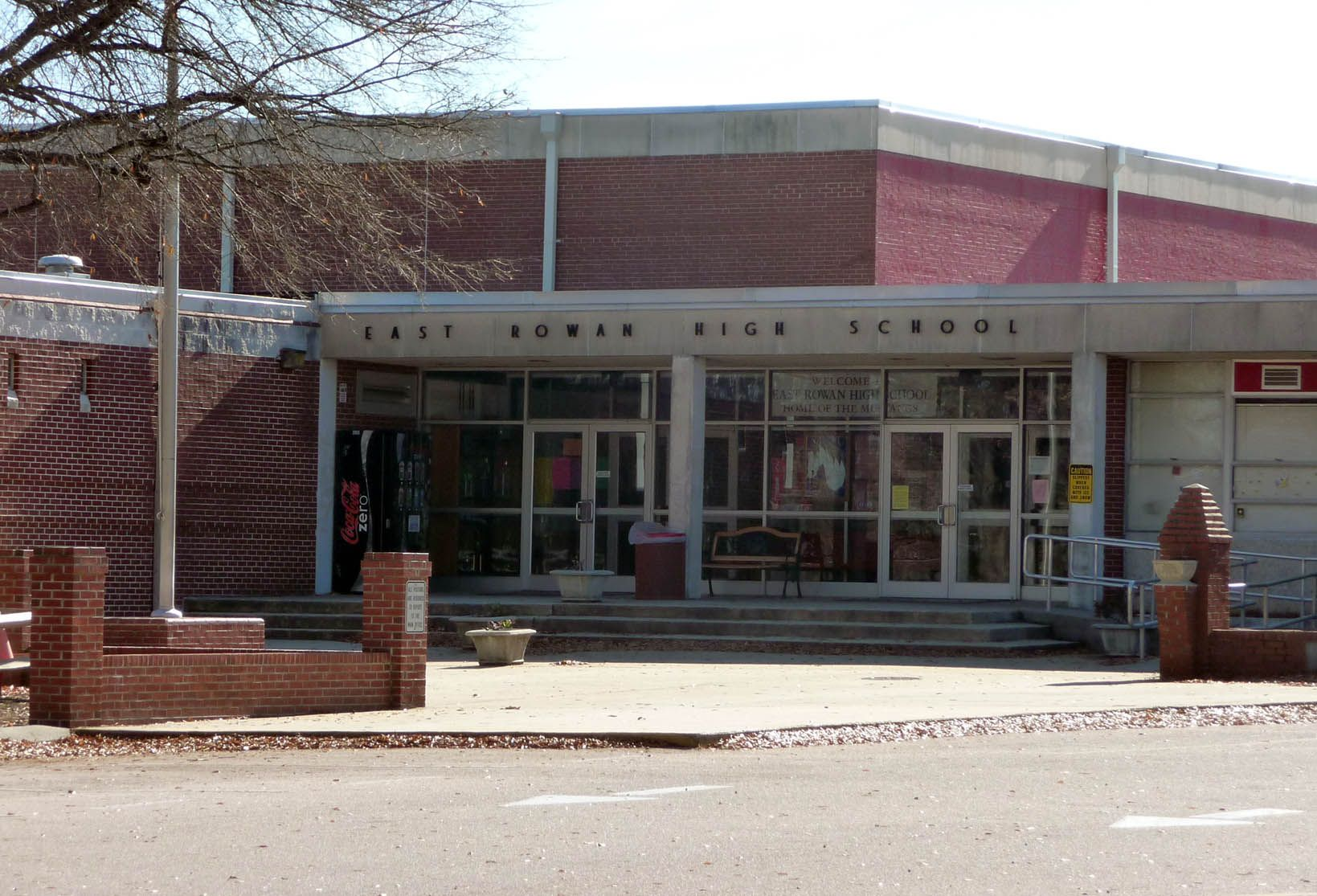
- East Rowan High School entrance

Location
- 175 St. Luke's Church Road; Salisbury, North Carolina 28146; United States; 35°35′39″N 80°25′26″W

Information
- Type: Public
- Established: 1959 (67 years ago)
- CEEB code: 343498
- NCES School ID: 370405001616
- Principal: Tonya B. German
- Teaching staff: 58.29 (FTE)
- Enrollment: 1,072 (2023-2024)
- Student to teacher ratio: 18.39
- Campus type: Rural
- Colors: Red, white, and blue
- Mascot: Mustangs
- Website: erhs.rssed.org

East Rowan High School is a public, co-educational secondary school located in Granite Quarry, North Carolina. It is one of seven high schools in the Rowan-Salisbury School System.

== History ==
East Rowan High School was formed in 1959, from the consolidation of Rockwell High School and Granite Quarry High School.

== School information ==
For the 2010–2011 school year, East Rowan High School had a total population of 1,110 students and 70.40 teachers on a (FTE) basis. For the student population, the gender ratio was 51.08% male to 48.92% female. The demographic group makeup of the student population was: White, 88.47%; Black, 6.22%; Hispanic, 2.79%; American Indian, 0.45%; and Asian/Pacific Islander, 0.81% (two or more races was 1.26%). For the same school year, 39.37% of the students received free and reduced-cost lunches.

Graduations are generally held at Catawba College's Keppel Auditorium.

== Academics ==
East Rowan High School was rated a School of Distinction for the 2009–2010 and 2010–2011 school years on the North Carolina State Board of Education's yearly School Report Cards.

== Athletics ==
East Rowan is a member of the North Carolina High School Athletic Association (NCHSAA).

The school's mascot is the Mustangs, wearing the school colors of red, white, and blue.

The East Rowan baseball team has won three NCHSAA 3A state championships, winning in 1995, 2010 and 2024.

== Marching band competition ==
The school hosts the Mustang Classic, formerly known as the East Rowan-Food Lion Classic, a marching band competition inviting schools from around the North Carolina Piedmont. The event has been held annually every October since 1995.

== Notable alumni ==
- Phil Kirk (1963), former NC State Senator and former chairman of the North Carolina State Board of Education
- Bobby Parnell (2002), MLB pitcher
