= Bruce Wasem =

American football and baseball coach

Playing career

Football
- ?: Bluffton

Coaching career (HC unless noted)

Football
- 1974–1990: Wilmington (OH) (assistant)
- 1991–2001: Virginia–Wise (DC)
- 2002–2010: Virginia–Wise

Baseball
- 1974–1990: Wilmington (OH)

Head coaching record
- Overall: 48–52 (football)

Accomplishments and honors

Championships
- 1 MSC East Division (2007)

Awards
- MSC Coach of the Year (2006)

Bruce W. Wasem is an American former football and baseball coach. He served as head football coach at the University of Virginia's College at Wise for eight seasons, from 2002 until 2010, compiling a record of 48–52. He helped start the program in 1991. For the 2006 season, he was awarded conference coach of the year and the team was given the NAIA Champions of Character award. He previously was the head baseball coach and assistant football coach for Wilmington College in Wilmington, Ohio.

== Head coaching record ==
=== Football ===
Year	Team	Overall	Conference	Standing	Bowl/playoffs	NAIA^{#}
Virginia–Wise Highland Cavaliers (Mid-South Conference) (2002–2010)
2002	Virginia–Wise	3–7	2–6	8th		
2003	Virginia–Wise	3–8	2–7	T–8th		
2004	Virginia–Wise	3–8	3–7	T–8th		
2005	Virginia–Wise	4–7	1–4	5th (East)		
2006	Virginia–Wise	9–3	4–2	2nd (East)		24
2007	Virginia–Wise	10–2	5–1	1st (East)		14
2008	Virginia–Wise	8–3	4–2	2nd (East)		19
2009	Virginia–Wise	5–6	4–2	T–2nd (East)		
2010	Virginia–Wise	3–8	3–3	4th (East)		
Virginia–Wise:		48–52	28–34			
Total:		48–52				
National championship Conference title Conference division title or championship game berth
^{#}Rankings from final NAIA Coaches' Poll.
