= Jason Killday =

American football coach (born c. 1982)

Current position
- Title: Head coach
- Team: Quincy
- Conference: GLVC
- Record: 11–10

Biographical details
- Born: c. 1982 (age 43–44)
- Education: Illinois College (2005); MacMurray College (2006)

Playing career
- 2001–2004: Illinois College
- Position: Quarterback

Coaching career (HC unless noted)
- 2005–2006: Sacred Heart-Griffin HS (IL) (co-OC)
- 2007: Edwardsville HS (IL) (co-OC/WR)
- 2008–2009: Lincoln-Way Central HS (IL) (OC/QB)
- 2010–2014: Quincy (QB/WR)
- 2015: Quincy (AHC/QB/WR)
- 2016–2023: Truman (OC/QB)
- 2024–present: Quincy

Head coaching record
- Overall: 11–10

Jason Killday (born c. 1982) is an American college football coach. He is the head football coach for Quincy University, a position he has held since 2024. He also coached for Sacred Heart-Griffin High School, Edwardsville High School, Lincoln-Way Central High School, and Truman. He played college football for Illinois College as a quarterback.

== Head coaching record ==
Year	Team	Overall	Conference	Standing	Bowl/playoffs
Quincy Hawks (Great Lakes Valley Conference) (2024–present)
2024	Quincy	5–4	5–3	4th	
2025	Quincy	6–5	4–4	T–4th	
2026	Quincy	0–1	0–0		
Quincy:		11–10	9–7		
Total:		11–10			
