= Atiba Bradley =

American football coach (born c. 1983)

Biographical details
- Born: c. 1983 (age 42–43); Joplin, Missouri, U.S.
- Education: Missouri Southern State University (2006); University of Missouri (2008)

Playing career
- 2002–2005: Missouri Southern
- Position: Linebacker

Coaching career (HC unless noted)
- 2007: Missouri Southern (OL/TE)
- 2008–2009: Missouri (GA)
- 2010–2011: Missouri Southern (AHC/LB)
- 2012: Quincy (AHC/DC)
- 2013–2014: Western Illinois (LB)
- 2015: Western Illinois (co-DC)
- 2016–2018: South Dakota (co-DC/LB)
- 2019: McKendree (DC/LB)
- 2020–2026: Missouri Southern

Head coaching record
- Overall: 19–38

Atiba Bradley (born c. 1983) is an American college football coach, most recently serving as the head coach at Missouri Southern State University, a position he has held from 2020 to 2026. He previously coached for Missouri, Quincy, Western Illinois, South Dakota, and McKendree. He played football for Missouri Southern as a linebacker.

== Head coaching record ==
Year	Team	Overall	Conference	Standing	Bowl/playoffs
Missouri Southern Lions (Mid-America Intercollegiate Athletics Association) (2020–present)
2020–21	Missouri Southern	1–0	0–0	N/A	
2021	Missouri Southern	3–8	3–8	10th	
2022	Missouri Southern	4–7	4–7	T–8th	
2023	Missouri Southern	5–6	4–6	T–7th	
2024	Missouri Southern	2–9	1–8	10th	
2025	Missouri Southern	3–8	1–8	10th	
Missouri Southern:		19–38	13–37		
Total:		19–38			
