= Dewey Lusk =

American football coach (born 1962)

Current position
- Title: Head coach
- Team: Bluefield
- Conference: AAC
- Record: 44–51

Biographical details
- Born: October 7, 1962 (age 64); Christiansburg, Virginia, U.S.
- Education: Emory and Henry College (1985); Gardner–Webb University (1987)

Coaching career (HC unless noted)

Football
- 1985–1989: Gardner–Webb (assistant)
- 1990: Abingdon HS (VA) (assistant)
- 1991–2004: Emory & Henry (OC)
- 2005–2010: Virginia–Wise (OC)
- 2011–2015: Virginia–Wise
- 2016: Webber International (OC)
- 2017–present: Bluefield

Baseball
- 1992–2004: Emory & Henry

Head coaching record
- Overall: 57–93 (football); 146–270–1 (baseball)

Dewey Lusk (born October 7, 1962) is an American college football coach. He is the head football coach for Bluefield University, a position he has held since 2017. He was the head football coach for the University of Virginia's College at Wise from 2011 to 2015. He also coached for Gardner–Webb, Abingdon High School, Emory & Henry, and Webber International.

== Head coaching record ==
=== Football ===
Year	Team	Overall	Conference	Standing	Bowl/playoffs
Virginia–Wise Cavaliers (Mid-South Conference) (2011–2012)
2011	Virginia–Wise	5–6	1–4	T–5th (East)	
2012	Virginia–Wise	3–8	1–4	T–4th (East)	
Virginia–Wise Cavaliers (Mountain East Conference) (2013–2015)
2013	Virginia–Wise	2–9	2–7	T–9th	
2014	Virginia–Wise	2–9	2–8	T–9th	
2015	Virginia–Wise	1–10	1–9	T–10th	
Virginia–Wise:		13–42	7–32		
Bluefield Rams (Mid-South Conference) (2017–2021)
2017	Bluefield	6–5	4–2	2nd (Appalachian)	
2018	Bluefield	4–7	1–4	T–5th (Appalachian)	
2019	Bluefield	4–7	3–3	4th (Appalachian)	
2020–21	Bluefield	2–7	1–5	T–6th (Appalachian)	
2021	Bluefield	6–5	4–2	3rd (Appalachian)	
Bluefield Rams (Appalachian Athletic Conference) (2022–present)
2022	Bluefield	8–3	4–1	2nd	
2023	Bluefield	5–5	3–3	T–3rd	
2024	Bluefield	5–6	4–2	3rd	
2025	Bluefield	4–6	3–3	4th	
2026	Bluefield	0–0	0–0		
Bluefield:		44–51	27–25		
Total:		57–93			
