= Andy Ball =

American football coach

Current position
- Title: Head coach
- Team: Missouri S&T
- Conference: GLVC
- Record: 17–26

Biographical details
- Education: University of Central Missouri (2001, 2003)

Coaching career (HC unless noted)
- 2002–2003: Central Missouri (GA)
- 2004–2006: Culver–Stockton (OL/DL)
- 2007–2010: Missouri S&T (OL)
- 2011–2014: Truman (ST/DL)
- 2015–2016: Missouri Western (OL)
- 2017: Central HS (MO)
- 2018: Missouri S&T (OC/OL)
- 2019–2021: Missouri S&T (AHC/OC/OL)
- 2022–present: Missouri S&T

Head coaching record
- Overall: 17–26 (college); 3–6 (high school)

Andrew Ball is an American college football coach. He is the head football coach for Missouri University of Science and Technology, a position he has held since 2022. He also was the head coach for Central High School in 2017. He previously coached for Central Missouri, Culver–Stockton, Truman, and Missouri Western.

== Personal life ==
Ball's father, Randy, was the head coach for Missouri State and Western Illinois.

== Head coaching record ==
=== College ===
Year	Team	Overall	Conference	Standing	Bowl/playoffs
Missouri S&T Miners (Great Lakes Valley Conference) (2022–present)
2022	Missouri S&T	3–7	2–4	T–4th	
2023	Missouri S&T	4–7	4–3	4th	
2024	Missouri S&T	4–7	3–5	T–6th	
2025	Missouri S&T	6–5	4–4	T–4th	
Missouri S&T:		17–26	13–16		
Total:		17–26			

=== High school ===
Year	Team	Overall	Conference	Standing	Bowl/playoffs
Central Indians () (2017)
2017	Central	3–6	2–3	T–4th	
Central:		3–6	2–3		
Total:		3–6			
