= 2026 NCAA Division II football season =

American college football season

- Total No. of teams: 160
- Regular season: August 27 – November 14, 2026
- Playoffs: November 21 – December 19, 2026
- National Championship: McKinney Independent School District Stadium; McKinney, TX; December 19, 2026

The 2026 NCAA Division II football season, part of college football in the United States organized by the National Collegiate Athletic Association (NCAA) at the Division II level, began on August 27 and will end on December 19 with the Division II championship at the McKinney Independent School District Stadium in McKinney, Texas.

== Conference changes and new programs ==
School	Former conference	New conference	Ref
West Florida Argonauts	Gulf South	UAC (FCS)	

== Headlines ==
- April 2 – After falling below the minimum required number of football-sponsoring members, the Gulf South Conference lost automatic qualification status for the NCAA Division II football championship, beginning in the fall of 2026. A request for a waiver for the requirement was denied by the NCAA Division II Championship Committee.
- August 5 – The Division II Executive Board adopted the same age-based eligibility model that Division I adopted the previous month. Going forward, athletes have five years of full eligibility, starting with full-time college enrollment or the start of the academic year following their 19th birthday, whichever is sooner. No redshirting is allowed, even for medical reasons, with exceptions limited to active-duty military service, pregnancy, or religious missions. Students enrolling full-time in college for the first time in 2026, plus those who had remaining eligibility under previous rules at the end of 2025–26, can use whichever model is most advantageous to them. Those who exhausted their eligibility under previous rules in 2025–26 would not receive any additional eligibility, even if they initially enrolled in 2022–23 (giving them four years of eligibility).
- August 29 – Shortly after scoring a touchdown for William Jewell in the first quarter of the Cardinals' game against Fort Lewis, running back MicahJo Barnett had a medical emergency on the sideline and was transported to a nearby hospital, where he was pronounced dead. The game was suspended with William Jewell leading 7–0.
- September 5 – A non-conference game between Colorado Mines and Washburn ended in a 16–16 tie due to extreme heat.
- October 2 – Valdosta State announced its football team will depart the Gulf South Conference after the 2026–27 season, becoming a Division II independent.
- November 7 – Ferris State wins its 40th straight game in an 80–0 win over Wayne State (MI), which tied a record from Grand Valley State for the most Division II wins in a row. They would set the record the next week, on November 14, in a 63–20 win over Roosevelt.

== Conference standings ==
=== Super Region 1 ===
2026 Central Intercollegiate Athletic Association football standings
	Conf.			Overall
Team	W		L	W		L
No. 13 Virginia Union y$^	8	–	0	10	–	1
Johnson C. Smith y	7	–	1	8	–	3
Fayetteville State ^	6	–	2	8	–	3
Virginia State	6	–	2	7	–	4
Bowie State	5	–	3	5	–	5
Elizabeth City State	4	–	4	4	–	6
Shaw	2	–	6	4	–	6
Livingstone	2	–	6	3	–	7
Winston-Salem State	2	–	6	2	–	8
Lincoln (PA)	1	–	7	1	–	9
Bluefield State	1	–	7	1	–	9
Championship: Virginia Union 15, Johnson C. Smith 14
$ – Conference champion; y – Championship game participant; ^ – NCAA Division II playoff participant; As of November 22, 2026; Rankings from AFCA poll

2026 Mountain East Conference football standings
	Conf.			Overall
Team	W		L	W		L
West Liberty +	6	–	2	8	–	3
Charleston (WV) +^	6	–	2	6	–	5
Concord	5	–	3	8	–	3
West Virginia Wesleyan	4	–	4	5	–	6
Wheeling	4	–	4	5	–	6
Fairmont State	4	–	4	4	–	7
West Virginia State	3	–	5	5	–	6
Frostburg State	3	–	5	4	–	7
Glenville State	1	–	7	2	–	9
+ – Conference co-champions; ^ – NCAA Division II playoff participant; As of November 22, 2026; Rankings from AFCA poll

2026 Northeast-10 Conference football standings
	Conf.			Overall
Team	W		L	W		L
Assumption $^	7	–	0	8	–	2
Bentley	5	–	2	7	–	3
Franklin Pierce	5	–	2	6	–	4
Pace	5	–	2	6	–	4
American International	3	–	4	5	–	6
Southern Connecticut	2	–	5	4	–	6
Saint Anselm	1	–	6	1	–	9
Post	0	–	7	0	–	10
$ – Conference champion; ^ – NCAA Division II playoff participant; As of November 22, 2026; Rankings from AFCA poll

2026 Pennsylvania State Athletic Conference football standings
	Conf.			Overall
Team	W		L	W		L
East Division
No. 14 East Stroudsburg xy^	6	–	0	9	–	2
No. 11 Kutztown ^	5	–	1	10	–	1
Bloomsburg	4	–	2	7	–	4
Shepherd	3	–	3	8	–	3
West Chester	2	–	4	5	–	6
Shippensburg	1	–	5	4	–	7
Millersville	0	–	6	1	–	10
West Division
No. 5 Slippery Rock xy$^	7	–	0	11	–	0
California (PA) ^	5	–	2	8	–	3
Lock Haven	4	–	3	6	–	5
Clarion	3	–	4	6	–	5
IUP	3	–	4	6	–	5
Seton Hill	3	–	4	4	–	7
Edinboro	2	–	5	4	–	7
Gannon	1	–	6	2	–	9
Championship: Slippery Rock 44, East Stroudsburg 14
$ – Conference champion; x – Division champion/co-champions; y – Championship game participant; ^ – NCAA Division II playoff participant; As of November 22, 2026; Rankings from AFCA poll

=== Super Region 2 ===
2026 Conference Carolinas football standings
	Conf.			Overall
Team	W		L	W		L
No. 25 UNC Pembroke y$^	5	–	1	9	–	2
North Greenville y	5	–	1	8	–	3
Chowan	5	–	1	6	–	5
Ferrum*	3	–	3	3	–	8
Shorter	2	–	4	3	–	8
Erskine	1	–	5	4	–	7
Barton	0	–	6	1	–	10
Championship: UNC Pembroke 21, North Greenville 14
$ – Conference champion; y – Championship game participant; ^ – NCAA Division II playoff participant; * – Ferrum ineligible for postseason play due to transition from NCAA Division III; As of November 22, 2026; Rankings from AFCA poll

2026 Gulf South Conference football standings
	Conf.			Overall
Team	W		L	W		L
No. 12 Valdosta State $^	2	–	0	8	–	1
Delta State	1	–	1	5	–	4
West Alabama	0	–	2	6	–	5
$ – Conference champion; ^ – NCAA Division II playoff participant; As of November 22, 2026; Rankings from AFCA poll

2026 South Atlantic Conference football standings
	Conf.			Overall
Team	W		L	W		L
No. 18 Carson–Newman +^	7	–	2	9	–	2
No. 23 Newberry +^	7	–	2	9	–	2
Lenoir–Rhyne	5	–	4	6	–	5
Wingate	5	–	4	6	–	5
Mars Hill	4	–	5	5	–	5
Anderson (SC)	4	–	5	5	–	6
Catawba	4	–	5	5	–	6
Emory & Henry	4	–	5	5	–	6
Tusculum	3	–	6	4	–	7
UVA Wise	2	–	7	2	–	9
+ – Conference co-champions; ^ – NCAA Division II playoff participant; As of November 22, 2026; Rankings from AFCA poll

2026 Southern Intercollegiate Athletic Conference football standings
	Conf.			Overall
Team	W		L	W		L
No. 15 Benedict y$^	7	–	1	10	–	1
Kentucky State y^	7	–	1	8	–	3
Central State (OH) ^	6	–	2	6	–	4
Edward Waters ^	5	–	3	7	–	4
Miles	5	–	3	5	–	5
Tuskegee	5	–	3	5	–	5
Albany State	5	–	3	6	–	5
Allen	3	–	5	4	–	6
Clark Atlanta	3	–	5	3	–	7
Morehouse	3	–	5	3	–	7
Fort Valley State	1	–	7	2	–	8
Savannah State	1	–	7	2	–	8
Lane	1	–	7	1	–	9
Championship: Benedict 52, Kentucky State 45 ^{OT}
$ – Conference champion; y – Championship game participant; ^ – NCAA Division II playoff participant; As of November 22, 2026; Rankings from AFCA poll

=== Super Region 3 ===
2026 Great Lakes Intercollegiate Athletic Conference football standings
	Conf.			Overall
Team	W		L	W		L
No. 1 Ferris State $^	7	–	0	11	–	0
No. 11 Michigan Tech ^	6	–	1	9	–	2
No. 20 Grand Valley State ^	4	–	3	8	–	3
Davenport	4	–	3	8	–	3
Saginaw Valley State	4	–	3	6	–	5
Northern Michigan	2	–	5	2	–	9
Roosevelt	1	–	6	5	–	6
Wayne State (MI)	0	–	7	0	–	11
$ – Conference champion; ^ – NCAA Division II playoff participant; As of November 22, 2026; Rankings from AFCA poll

2026 Great Lakes Valley Conference football standings
	Conf.			Overall
Team	W		L	W		L
Truman $^	7	–	1	7	–	4
William Jewell	6	–	2	7	–	3
Indianapolis	6	–	2	7	–	4
Upper Iowa	5	–	3	6	–	5
Southwest Baptist	4	–	4	5	–	6
McKendree	3	–	5	3	–	8
Quincy	2	–	6	3	–	8
Missouri S&T	2	–	6	2	–	8
Lincoln (MO)	1	–	7	2	–	8
$ – Conference champion; ^ – NCAA Division II playoff participant; # – Albanese Candy Bowl participant; As of November 22, 2026; Rankings from AFCA poll

2026 Great Midwest Athletic Conference football standings
	Conf.			Overall
Team	W		L	W		L
No. 5 Northwood $^	9	–	0	11	–	0
No. 9 Findlay ^	8	–	1	10	–	1
Hillsdale	6	–	3	8	–	3
Tiffin	5	–	4	6	–	5
Walsh	4	–	5	6	–	5
Ohio Dominican	4	–	5	5	–	6
Ashland	4	–	5	4	–	7
Thomas More	3	–	6	3	–	8
Lake Erie	2	–	7	4	–	7
Kentucky Wesleyan	0	–	9	0	–	11
$ – Conference champion; ^ – NCAA Division II playoff participant; # – Albanese Candy Bowl participant; As of November 22, 2026; Rankings from AFCA poll

2026 Northern Sun Intercollegiate Conference football standings
	Conf.			Overall
Team	W		L	W		L
North
Northern State x	7	–	3	8	–	3
Minnesota Duluth	7	–	3	7	–	4
MSU Moorhead	6	–	4	7	–	4
Bemidji State	6	–	4	6	–	5
Minot State	4	–	6	4	–	7
Mary	2	–	8	3	–	8
Jamestown	0	–	10	0	–	11
South
No. 14 Augustana (SD) x$^	8	–	2	9	–	2
No. 17 Minnesota State x^	8	–	2	9	–	2
Wayne State (NE)	7	–	3	8	–	3
Sioux Falls	7	–	3	7	–	4
Winona State	5	–	5	5	–	6
Concordia–St. Paul	3	–	7	4	–	7
SW Minnesota State	0	–	10	1	–	10
$ – Conference champion; x – Division champion/co-champions; ^ – NCAA Division II playoff participant; As of November 22, 2026; Rankings from AFCA poll

=== Super Region 4 ===
2026 Great American Conference football standings
	Conf.			Overall
Team	W		L	W		L
No. 2 Harding $^	11	–	0	11	–	0
No. 21 Ouachita Baptist ^	9	–	2	9	–	2
Henderson State	8	–	3	8	–	3
SE Oklahoma State #	8	–	3	8	–	3
East Central	7	–	4	7	–	4
SW Oklahoma State	5	–	5	5	–	5
Arkansas Tech	4	–	7	4	–	7
Oklahoma Baptist	4	–	7	4	–	7
Southern Nazarene	3	–	7	3	–	7
Arkansas–Monticello	3	–	8	3	–	8
Southern Arkansas	3	–	8	3	–	8
NW Oklahoma State	0	–	11	0	–	11
$ – Conference champion; ^ – NCAA Division II playoff participant; # – Heritage Bowl participant; As of November 22, 2026; Rankings from AFCA poll

2026 Lone Star Conference football standings
	Conf.			Overall
Team	W		L	W		L
No. 7 Central Washington $^	9	–	0	10	–	2
No. 16 Midwestern State ^	8	–	1	9	–	3
Texas A&M–Kingsville	6	–	3	6	–	5
Western Oregon	5	–	4	7	–	4
UT Permian Basin	5	–	4	6	–	5
Angelo State	5	–	4	5	–	6
West Texas A&M	4	–	5	4	–	7
Western New Mexico	2	–	7	3	–	8
Sul Ross	1	–	8	2	–	9
Eastern New Mexico	0	–	9	0	–	11
$ – Conference champion; ^ – NCAA Division II playoff participant; As of November 22, 2026; Rankings from AFCA poll

2026 Mid-America Intercollegiate Athletics Association football standings
	Conf.					Overall
Team	W		L		T	W		L		T
No. 6 NW Missouri State $^	8	–	1	–	0	9	–	1	–	0
No. 22 Washburn ^	7	–	2	–	0	8	–	2	–	1
Emporia State	6	–	3	–	0	8	–	3	–	0
Central Missouri #	6	–	3	–	0	7	–	4	–	0
Central Oklahoma	4	–	5	–	0	5	–	6	–	0
Pittsburg State	4	–	5	–	0	4	–	7	–	0
Fort Hays State	3	–	6	–	0	4	–	7	–	0
Missouri Southern	3	–	6	–	0	4	–	7	–	0
Missouri Western	2	–	7	–	0	3	–	8	–	0
Nebraska–Kearney	2	–	7	–	0	2	–	9	–	0
$ – Conference champion; ^ – NCAA Division II playoff participant; # – Heritage Bowl participant; As of November 22, 2026; Rankings from AFCA Poll

2026 Rocky Mountain Athletic Conference football standings
	Conf.					Overall
Team	W		L		T	W		L		T
No. 3 CSU Pueblo $^	9	–	0	–	0	11	–	0	–	0
No. 8 Western Colorado ^	8	–	1	–	0	10	–	1	–	0
Colorado Mines	7	–	2	–	0	7	–	3	–	1
Colorado Mesa	6	–	3	–	0	7	–	4	–	0
Chadron State #	5	–	4	–	0	6	–	5	–	0
Black Hills State	3	–	6	–	0	5	–	6	–	0
South Dakota Mines	3	–	6	–	0	5	–	6	–	0
New Mexico Highlands	2	–	7	–	0	4	–	7	–	0
Fort Lewis	1	–	8	–	0	2	–	8	–	0
Adams State	1	–	8	–	0	1	–	10	–	0
$ – Conference champion; ^ – NCAA Division II playoff participant; # – First Americans Bowl participant; As of November 22, 2026; Rankings from AFCA poll

2026 NCAA Division II independents football records
	Conf.			Overall
Team	W		L	W		L
Northeastern State #		–		7	–	3
# – First Americans Bowl participant

== Postseason ==
=== Automatic bids (15) ===
Automatic bids
Super Region	Conference	School	Record	Appearance	Last
Super Region 1	CIAA	Virginia Union	10–1	14th	2025
Super Region 1	Mountain East	Charleston (WV)	6–5	4th	2024
Super Region 1	Northeast-10	Assumption	8–2	14th	2025
Super Region 1	PSAC	Slippery Rock	11–0	13th	2024
Super Region 2	Carolinas	UNC Pembroke	9–2	4th	2016
Super Region 2	South Atlantic	Newberry	9–2	7th	2025
Super Region 2	SIAC	Benedict	10–1	4th	2025
Super Region 3	GLIAC	Ferris State	11–0	17th	2025
Super Region 3	GLVC	Truman	7–4	6th	2025
Super Region 3	Great Midwest	Northwood	11–0	6th	2025
Super Region 3	Northern Sun	Augustana (SD)	9–2	9th	2024
Super Region 4	Great American	Harding	11–0	9th	2025
Super Region 4	Lone Star	Central Washington	9–2	10th	2025
Super Region 4	MIAA	NW Missouri State	9–1	28th	2025
Super Region 4	Rocky Mountain	CSU Pueblo	11–0	12th	2025

=== At-large bids (17) ===
At-large bids
Super Region	School	Conference	Record	Appearance	Last
Super Region 1	Kutztown	PSAC	10–1	9th	2025
Super Region 1	East Stroudsburg	PSAC	9–2	7th	2024
Super Region 1	California (PA)	PSAC	8–3	10th	2025
Super Region 1	Fayetteville State	CIAA	8–3	5th	2022
Super Region 2	Valdosta State	Gulf South	8–1	22nd	2025
Super Region 2	Kentucky State	SIAC	8–3	2nd	2025
Super Region 2	Central State	SIAC	6–4	5th	1986
Super Region 2	Carson–Newman	South Atlantic	9–2	18th	2024
Super Region 2	Edward Waters	SIAC	7–4	1st	—
Super Region 3	Michigan Tech	GLIAC	9–2	3rd	2014
Super Region 3	Findlay	Great Midwest	10–1	4th	2025
Super Region 3	Minnesota State	Northern Sun	9–2	17th	2025
Super Region 3	Grand Valley State	GLIAC	8–3	24th	2024
Super Region 4	Western Colorado	Rocky Mountain	10–1	8th	2025
Super Region 4	Washburn	MIAA	8–2–1	5th	2021
Super Region 4	Ouachita Baptist	Great American	9–2	7th	2024
Super Region 4	Midwestern State	Lone Star	9–2	9th	2017

=== Bracket ===
Host team indicated either by higher seed or * where applicable.

==== Super Region 1 ====
First Round; November 21, 2026; Campus sites
1	Slippery Rock	59
Charleston (WV)	21
4	Virginia Union	14
California (PA)	31
2	Kutztown	34
Fayetteville State	13
3	East Stroudsburg	24
Assumption	3

Second Round; November 28, 2026; Campus sites
1	Slippery Rock
California (PA)
2	Kutztown
3	East Stroudsburg

Quarterfinals; December 5, 2026; Campus sites

==== Super Region 2 ====
First Round; November 21, 2026; Campus sites
1	Benedict	3
Newberry	38
4	Central State	23
*	UNC Pembroke	42
2	Valdosta State	56
Edward Waters	26
3	Kentucky State	14
Carson–Newman	42

Second Round; November 28, 2026; Campus sites
Newberry
*	UNC Pembroke
2	Valdosta State
Carson–Newman

Quarterfinals; December 5, 2026; Campus sites

==== Super Region 3 ====
First Round; November 21, 2026; Campus sites
1	Ferris State	45
Truman	14
4	Findlay (OT)	23
Augustana (SD)	20
2	Northwood	16
Grand Valley State	27
3	Michigan Tech	35
Minnesota State	21

Second Round; November 28, 2026; Campus sites
1	Ferris State
4	Findlay
Grand Valley State
3	Michigan Tech

Quarterfinals; December 5, 2026; Campus sites

==== Super Region 4 ====
First Round; November 21, 2026; Campus sites
1	CSU Pueblo	34
Midwestern State	10
4	Central Washington	24
Western Colorado	17
2	Harding	58
Washburn	31
3	NW Missouri State	45
Ouachita Baptist	14

Second Round; November 28, 2026; Campus sites
1	CSU Pueblo
4	Central Washington
2	Harding
3	NW Missouri State

Quarterfinals; December 5, 2026; Campus sites

=== Semifinals & Championship ===
Teams are re-seeded prior to semifinals.

Semifinals; December 12, 2026; Hosted by higher seeded team

Championship; December 19, 2026; McKinney, Texas

=== Bowl games ===
Division II will hold 3 bowl games in 2026, featuring teams that did not qualify for the Division II postseason tournament.

Date	Time (EST)	Game	Site	Television	Teams	Affiliations	Results
Dec. 5	1 p.m.	Heritage Bowl	Community National Bank and Trust Stadium; Corsicana, Texas	Livestream	Central Missouri; SE Oklahoma State	MIAA; GAC	
Dec. 5	TBD	Albanese Candy Bowl	Brickyard Stadium; Hobart, Indiana	TBD			
Dec. 5	2 p.m.	First Americans Bowl	Doc Wadley Stadium; Tahlequah, Oklahoma	FloSports	Chadron State; Northeastern State	RMAC; Independent	

== Coaching changes ==
=== Preseason and in-season ===
This is restricted to coaching changes that took place on or after May 1, 2026, and will include any changes announced after a team's last regularly scheduled games but before its playoff games.

School	Outgoing coach	Date	Reason	Replacement	Previous position
Jamestown	Brian Mistro	June 8, 2026	Resigned (became school's athletic director)	Tom Dosch	Jamestown associate head coach and special teams coordinator (2025)
Southwest Minnesota State	Scott Underwood	September 20, 2026	Retired	Levi Bullerman (interim)	Southwest Minnesota State defensive coordinator (2022–2026)
Tuskegee	Aaron James	October 4, 2026	Fired	Keith Higdon (interim)	Tuskegee assistant head coach and offensive line coach (2009–2026)
Central Oklahoma	Adam Dorrel	October 5, 2026	Resigned	Cody Swanson (interim)	Central Oklahoma defensive coordinator (2024–2026)
Lane	Stanley Conner	October 20, 2026	Fired	Jeremy Patterson (interim)	Lane athletic director (2026)

=== End of season ===
This list includes coaching changes announced during the season that did not take effect until the end of the season.

School	Outgoing coach	Date	Reason	Replacement	Previous position
Fort Valley State	Marlon Watson	November 14, 2026	Fired		
Pittsburg State	Tom Anthony	November 15, 2026	Fired		
West Texas A&M	Josh Lynn	November 15, 2026	Fired		
Missouri Southern	Atiba Bradley	November 16, 2026	Fired		
Western New Mexico	Billy Hickman	November 16, 2026	Fired		
Oklahoma Baptist	Chris Jensen	November 16, 2026	Retired		
Bemidji State	Brent Bolte	November 16, 2026	Retirement	Jordan Hein	Bemidji State offensive coordinator (2018–2026)
Fort Lewis	Johnny Cox	November 17, 2026	Resigned		
Lincoln (MO)	Moses Harper	November 17, 2026	Resigned		
Lenoir–Rhyne	Doug Socha	November 17, 2026	Mutual Agreement		
Kentucky Wesleyan	Tyrone Young	November 18, 2026	Resigned		
Missouri S&T	Andy Ball	November 18, 2026	Unknown		

== See also ==
- 2026 NCAA Division I FBS football season
- 2026 NCAA Division I FCS football season
- 2026 NCAA Division III football season
- 2026 NAIA football season
- 2026 U Sports football season
- 2026 junior college football season
