= 2026 NCAA Division II football rankings =

Rankings for the 2026 NCAA Division II football season

- Season: 2026
- Postseason: Single-elimination
- Preseason No. 1: Ferris State

The 2026 National Collegiate Athletic Association (NCAA) Division II football rankings consists primarily of the AFCA Coaches Poll, determined by coaches part of NCAA Division II football programs. The following weekly polls determine the top 25 teams at the NCAA Division II level of college football for the 2026 season.

== Legend ==
	Increase in ranking
	Decrease in ranking
	Not ranked previous week or no change
	Selected for Division II Football Championship Playoffs
(#–#)	Win–loss record
(Italics)	Number of first place votes
т	Tied with team above or below also with this symbol

== AFCA poll ==
	Preseason August 18	Week 1 September 2	Week 2 September 8	Week 3 September 14	Week 4 September 21	Week 5 September 28	Week 6 October 5	Week 7 October 12	Week 8 October 19	Week 9 October 26	Week 10 November 2	Week 11 November 9	Week 12 November 16	Week 13 (Final)	
1.	Ferris State (31)	Ferris State (1–0) (31)	Ferris State (2–0) (31)	Ferris State (3–0) (31)	Ferris State (3–0) (31)	Ferris State (3–0) (31)	Ferris State (5–0) (31)	Ferris State (6–0) (29)	Ferris State (7–0) (30)	Ferris State (8–0) (29)	Ferris State (9–0) (29)	Ferris State (10–0) (29)	Ferris State (11–0) (29)		1.
2.	Harding	Harding (0–0)	Harding (1–0)	Harding (2–0)	Harding (3–0)	Harding (4–0)	Harding (5–0)	Harding (6–0)	Harding (7–0)	Harding (8–0)	Harding (9–0)	Harding (10–0)	Harding (11–0)		2.
3.	Kutztown	Kutztown (0–0)	Kutztown (1–0)	Kutztown (2–0)	Kutztown (3–0)	Kutztown (4–0)	Kutztown (5–0)	Kutztown (6–0)	Kutztown (7–0)	Kutztown (8–0)	CSU Pueblo (9–0)	CSU Pueblo (10–0)	CSU Pueblo (11–0)		3.
4.	Pittsburg State	Minnesota State (1–0)	Minnesota State (2–0)	Minnesota State (3–0)	Minnesota State (4–0)	CSU Pueblo (5–0)	CSU Pueblo (6–0)	CSU Pueblo (6–0)	CSU Pueblo (7–0)	CSU Pueblo (8–0)	Minnesota State (9–0)	Western Colorado (10–0)	Slippery Rock (11–0) (1)		4.
5.	Minnesota State	CSU Pueblo (1–0)	CSU Pueblo (2–0)	CSU Pueblo (3–0)	CSU Pueblo (4–0)	Minnesota State (5–0)	Minnesota State (6–0)	Minnesota State (7–0)	Minnesota State (7–0)	Minnesota State (8–0)	Western Colorado (9–0)	Slippery Rock (10–0) (1)	Northwood (11–0)		5.
6.	CSU Pueblo	Central Washington (0–0)	Grand Valley State (2–0)	Grand Valley State (3–0)	Grand Valley State (4–0)	Grand Valley State (4–0)	Grand Valley State (5–0)	Western Colorado (6–0)	Western Colorado (7–0)	Western Colorado (8–0)	Slippery Rock (9–0) (1)	Northwood (10–0)	Northwest Missouri State (9–1)		6.
7.	Central Washington	Grand Valley State (1–0)	Northwest Missouri State (1–0)	Northwest Missouri State (2–0)	Northwest Missouri State (3–0)	Western Colorado (5–0)	Western Colorado (6–0)	Slippery Rock (6–0)	Slippery Rock (7–0)	Slippery Rock (8–0)	Northwood (9–0)	Northwest Missouri State (8–1)	Central Washington (9–2)		7.
8.	Northwest Missouri State	Northwest Missouri State (1–0)	Western Colorado (2–0)	Western Colorado (2–0)	Western Colorado (3–0)	Slippery Rock (4–0)	Slippery Rock (5–0)	Emporia State (6–0)	Emporia State (7–0)	Emporia State (8–0)	Northwest Missouri State (7–1)	Central Washington (8–2)	Western Colorado (10–1)		8.
9.	Grand Valley State т	Indianapolis (1–0)	Central Washington (0–1)	Findlay (2–0)	Findlay (3–0)	IUP (4–0)	Emporia State (5–0)	Davenport (6–0)	Davenport (7–0)	Davenport (8–0)	Central Washington (7–2)	Findlay (9–1)	Findlay (10–1)		9.
10.	Indianapolis т	Pittsburg State (0–1)	Findlay (1–0)	Western Oregon (2–0)	Slippery Rock (3–0)	Emporia State (4–0)	IUP (5–0)	Northwood (6–0)	Northwood (7–0)	Northwood (8–0)	Findlay (8–1)	Minnesota State (9–1)	Kutztown (10–1)		10.
11.	Western Colorado	Western Colorado (1–0)	Newberry (1–0)	Slippery Rock (2–0)	IUP (3–0)	Davenport (4–0)	Davenport (5–0)	Central Washington (4–2)	Northwest Missouri State (5–1)	Northwest Missouri State (6–1)	Kutztown (8–1)	Kutztown (9–1)	Michigan Tech (9–2)		11.
12.	Minnesota Duluth	Ashland (0–0)	Western Oregon (2–0)	IUP (2–0)	Emporia State (4–0)	Central Washington (2–2)	Northwood (5–0)	Northwest Missouri State (4–1)	Michigan Tech (6–1)	Central Washington (6–2)	Davenport (8–1)	Michigan Tech (8–2)	Valdosta State (8–1)		12.
13.	Ashland	Newberry (0–0)	Slippery Rock (1–0)	Valdosta State (3–0)	Minnesota Duluth (3–1)	Northwest Missouri State (3–1)	Central Washington (3–2)	Grand Valley State (5–1)	Central Washington (5–2)	Findlay (7–1)	Carson–Newman (8–1)	Valdosta State (8–1)	Virginia Union (10–1)		13.
14.	Virginia Union	Frostburg State (0–0)	IUP (1–0)	Minnesota Duluth (2–1)	Central Washington (1–2)	Northwood (4–0)	Northwest Missouri State (3–1)	Michigan Tech (5–1)	Findlay (6–1)	Carson–Newman (7–1)	Michigan Tech (7–2)	East Stroudsburg (9–1)	Augustana (SD) (9–2)		14.
15.	Newberry	Findlay (0–0)	Minnesota Duluth (1–1)	Northeastern State (3–0)	Benedict (3–0)	Newberry (3–1)	North Greenville (5–0)	Henderson State (6–0)	Carson–Newman (7–1)	Michigan Tech (6–2)	Emporia State (8–1)	Virginia Union (9–1)	Benedict (10–1)		15.
16.	Findlay	Augustana (SD) (1–0)	Valdosta State (2–0)	Central Washington (0–2)	Carson–Newman (4–0)	Findlay (3–1)	Findlay (4–1)	Findlay (5–1)	Grand Valley State (5–2)	North Greenville (7–1)	North Greenville (8–1)	Augustana (SD) (8–2)	Midwestern State (9–2)		16.
17.	Frostburg State	Western Oregon (1–0)	Indianapolis (1–1)	Emporia State (3–0)	Western Oregon (2–1)	North Greenville (4–0)	Henderson State (5–0)	Valdosta State (4–1)	Valdosta State (4–1)	Valdosta State (5–1)	Valdosta State (6–1)	Benedict (9–1)	Minnesota State (9–2)		17.
18.	UT Permian Basin	Slippery Rock (1–0)	Northeastern State (2–0)	West Alabama (3–0)	Davenport (4–0)	Valdosta State (3–1)	Valdosta State (4–1)	Carson–Newman (6–1)	North Greenville (6–1)	Henderson State (7–1)	East Stroudsburg (8–1)	Davenport (8–2)	Carson–Newman (9–2)		18.
19.	Wingate	Minnesota Duluth (0–1)	Ashland (0–1)	Benedict (2–0)	Northeastern State (3–1)	Henderson State (4–0)	Michigan Tech (4–1)	IUP (5–1)	Henderson State (6–1)	Virginia Union (7–1)	Virginia Union (8–1)	Midwestern State (8–2)	East Stroudburg (9–2)		19.
20.	Augustana (SD)	Ouachita Baptist (0–0)	Michigan Tech (2–0)	Augustana (SD) (2–1)	Augustana (SD) (3–1)	Michigan Tech (3–1)	Mars Hill (5–0)	UT Permian Basin (5–1)	Virginia Union (6–1)	Minnesota Duluth (6–2)	Benedict (8–1)	Carson–Newman (8–2)	Grand Valley State (8–3)		20.
21.	Albany State	Lenoir–Rhyne (1–0)	Benedict (2–0)	Newberry (1–1)	Newberry (2–1)	Mars Hill (4–0) т	Carson–Newman (5–1)	West Alabama (5–1)	Minnesota Duluth (5–2)	Benedict (7–1)	Minnesota Duluth (7–2)	Emporia State (8–2)	Ouachita Baptist (9–2)		21.
22.	Western Oregon	IUP (0–0)	Augustana (SD) (1–1)	Carson–Newman (3–0)	Valdosta State (3–1)	Northeastern State (3–2) т	West Alabama (5–1)	North Greenville (5–1)	Wayne State (NE) (6–1)	Virginia State (7–1)	Augustana (SD) (7–2)	North Greenville (8–2)	Washburn (8–2–1)		22.
23.	Johnson C. Smith	Valdosta State (1–0)	Frostburg State (0–1)	Frostburg State (1–1)	Northwood (3–0)	Carson–Newman (4–1)	UT Permian Basin (4–1)	Minnesota Duluth (5–2)	Benedict (6–1)	West Liberty (7–1)	Grand Valley State (6–3)	Grand Valley State (7–3)	Newberry (9–2)		23.
24.	Ouachita Baptist	Northeastern State (1–0)	Emporia State (2–0)	Davenport (3–0)	Michigan Tech (3–1)	West Alabama (4–1)	Central Missouri (4–1)	Virginia Union (5–1)	Virginia State (7–1)	East Stroudsburg (7–1)	Midwestern State (7–2)	Wayne State (NE) (8–2)	Davenport (8–3)		24.
25.	IUP	Fort Hayes State (1–0)	Pittsburg State (0–2)	Michigan Tech (2–1) т; Northwood (2–0) т	North Greenville (3–0)	Walsh (4–0)	Northern State (5–1)	Wayne State (NE) (6–1)	West Alabama (5–2)	Grand Valley State (5–3)	Wayne State (NE) (7–2)	Ouachita Baptist (8–2)	UNC Pembroke (9–2)		25.
	Preseason August 18	Week 1 September 2	Week 2 September 8	Week 3 September 14	Week 4 September 21	Week 5 September 28	Week 6 October 5	Week 7 October 12	Week 8 October 19	Week 9 October 26	Week 10 November 2	Week 11 November 9	Week 12 November 16	Week 13 (Final)	
		Dropped: Virginia Union; UT Permian Basin; Wingate; Albany State; Johnson C. Smith	Dropped: Ouachita Baptist; Lenoir–Rhyne; Fort Hays State	Dropped: Indianapolis; Ashland; Pittsburg State	Dropped: West Alabama; Frostburg State	Dropped: Minnesota Duluth; Benedict; Western Oregon; Augustana (SD)	Dropped: Newberry; Northeastern State; Walsh	Dropped: Mars Hill; Central Missouri; Northern State	Dropped: IUP; UT Permian Basin	Dropped: Wayne State (NE); West Alabama	Dropped: Henderson State; Virginia State; West Liberty	Dropped: Minnesota Duluth	Dropped: Emporia State; North Greenville; Wayne State (NE)	None	

== D2Football.com poll ==
	Preseason August 17	Week 1 August 31	Week 2 September 7	Week 3 September 14	Week 4 September 21	Week 5 September 28	Week 6 October 5	Week 7 October 12	Week 8 October 19	Week 9 October 26	Week 10 November 2	Week 11 November 9	Week 12 November 16	Week 13 (Final)	
1.	Ferris State	Ferris State (1–0)	Ferris State (2–0)	Ferris State (3–0)	Ferris State (3–0)	Ferris State (4–0)	Ferris State (5–0)	Ferris State (6–0)	Ferris State (7–0)	Ferris State (8–0)	Ferris State (9–0)	Ferris State (10–0)	Ferris State (11–0)		1.
2.	Harding	Harding (0–0)	Harding (1–0)	Harding (2–0)	Harding (3–0)	Harding (4–0)	Harding (5–0)	Harding (6–0)	Harding (7–0)	Harding (8–0)	Harding (9–0)	Harding (10–0)	Harding (11–0)		2.
3.	Minnesota State	Minnesota State (1–0)	Minnesota State (2–0)	Minnesota State (3–0)	Minnesota State (4–0)	Minnesota State (5–0)	Minnesota State (6–0)	Minnesota State (7–0)	Minnesota State (7–0)	Minnesota State (8–0)	Minnesota State (9–0)	CSU Pueblo (10–0)	CSU Pueblo (11–0)		3.
4.	Kutztown	Kutztown (0–0)	Kutztown (1–0)	Kutztown (2–0)	Kutztown (3–0)	Kutztown (4–0)	Kutztown (5–0)	Kutztown (6–0)	Kutztown (7–0)	Kutztown (8–0)	CSU–Pueblo (9–0)	Western Colorado (10–0)	Central Washington (9–2)		4.
5.	Pittsburg State	Northwest Missouri State (1–0)	Northwest Missouri State (1–0)	Northwest Missouri State (2–0)	Northwest Missouri State (3–0)	Grand Valley State (4–0)	Grand Valley State (5–0)	CSU Pueblo (6–0)	CSU Pueblo (7–0)	CSU Pueblo (8–0)	Western Colorado (9–0)	Central Washington (8–2)	Slippery Rock (11–0)		5.
6.	Northwest Missouri State	Indianapolis (1–0)	Grand Valley State (2–0)	Grand Valley State (3–0)	Grand Valley State (4–0)	CSU Pueblo (5–0)	CSU Pueblo (6–0)	Western Colorado (6–0)	Western Colorado (7–0)	Western Colorado (8–0)	Central Washington (7–2)	Slippery Rock (10–0)	Northwest Missouri State (9–1)		6.
7.	Indianapolis	Grand Valley State (1–0)	CSU Pueblo (2–0)	CSU Pueblo (3–0)	CSU Pueblo (4–0)	Western Colorado (5–0)	Western Colorado (6–0)	Central Washington (4–2)	Central Washington (5–2)	Central Washington (6–2)	Slippery Rock (9–0)	Minnesota State (9–1)	Western Colorado (10–1)		7.
8.	Grand Valley State	Central Washington (0–0)	Western Colorado (2–0)	Western Colorado (3–0)	Western Colorado (4–0)	Central Washington (2–2)	Central Washington (3–2)	Slippery Rock (6–0)	Slippery Rock (7–0)	Slippery Rock (8–0)	Northwest Missouri State (7–1)	Northwest Missouri State (8–1)	Northwood (11–0)		8.
9.	Central Washington	CSU Pueblo (1–0)	Central Washington (0–1)	Valdosta State (3–0)	Central Washington (1–2)	Slippery Rock (4–0)	Slippery Rock (5–0)	Emporia State (6–0)	Emporia State (7–0)	Emporia State (8–0)	Northwood (9–0)	Northwood (10–0)	Kutztown (10–1)		9.
10.	CSU Pueblo	Western Colorado (1–0)	Valdosta State (2–0)	Central Washington (0–2)	Findlay (3–0)	Emporia State (4–0)	Emporia State (5–0)	Northwest Missouri State (4–1)	Northwest Missouri State (5–1)	Northwest Missouri State (6–1)	Kutztown (8–1)	Kutztown (9–1)	Michigan Tech (9–2)		10.
11.	Western Colorado	Pittsburg State (0–1)	Western Oregon (2–0)	Western Oregon (2–0)	Slippery Rock (3–0)	Northwest Missouri State (3–1)	Northwest Missouri State (3–1)	Northwood (6–0)	Northwood (7–0)	Northwood (8–0)	Davenport (8–1)	Michigan Tech (8–2)	Valdosta State (8–1)		11.
12.	Ashland	Ashland (0–0)	Findlay (1–0)	Findlay (2–0)	Minnesota Duluth (3–1)	Northwood (4–0)	Northwood (5–0)	Davenport (6–0)	Davenport (7–0)	Davenport (8–0)	Emporia State (8–1)	Valdosta State (7–1)	Findlay (10–1)		12.
13.	Augustana (SD)	Augustana (SD) (1–0)	Northeastern State (2–0)	Northeastern State (3–0)	Emporia State (4–0)	IUP (4–0)	IUP (5–0)	Grand Valley State (5–1)	Valdosta State (5–1)	Valdosta State (5–1)	Valdosta State (6–1)	Findlay (9–1)	Augustana (SD) (9–2)		13.
14.	Western Oregon	Western Oregon (1–0)	Slippery Rock (1–0)	Slippery Rock (2–0)	Western Oregon (2–1)	Davenport (4–0)	Davenport (5–0)	Valdosta State (4–1)	Michigan Tech (6–1)	Michigan Tech (6–2)	Michigan Tech (7–2)	East Stroudsburg (9–1)	Minnesota State (9–2)		14.
15.	Valdosta State	Valdosta State (1–0)	Newberry (1–0)	Minnesota Duluth (2–1)	Northeastern State (3–1)	Northeastern State (3–2)	Valdosta State (4–1)	Michigan Tech (5–1)	Findlay (6–1)	Findlay (7–1)	Findlay (8–1)	Augustana (SD) (8–2)	Benedict (10–1)		15.
16.	Virginia Union	Frostburg State (0–0)	Minnesota Duluth (1–1)	Emporia State (3–0)	Augustana (SD) (3–1)	Valdosta State (3–1)	North Greenville (5–0)	Findlay (5–1)	Grand Valley State (5–2)	Minnesota Duluth (6–2)	East Stroudsburg (8–1)	Emporia State (8–2)	Virginia Union (10–1)		16.
17.	Frostburg State	Findlay (0–0)	Augustana (SD) (1–1)	Augustana (SD) (2–1)	IUP (3–0)	Findlay (3–1)	Findlay (4–1)	Minnesota Duluth (5–2)	Minnesota Duluth (5–2)	Carson–Newman (7–1)	Minnesota Duluth (7–2)	Benedict (9–1)	Ouachita Baptist (9–2)		17.
18.	UT Permian Basin	Northeastern State (1–0)	Indianapolis (1–1)	IUP (2–0)	Davenport (4–0)	North Greenville (4–0)	Minnesota Duluth (4–2)	Henderson State (6–0)	Carson–Newman (7–1)	North Greenville (7–1)	Carson–Newman (8–1)	Virginia Union (9–1)	Midwestern State (9–2)		18.
19.	Findlay	Slippery Rock (1–0)	IUP (1–0)	West Alabama (3–0)	Valdosta State (3–1)	Minnesota Duluth (3–2)	Central Missouri (4–1)	UT Permian Basin (5–1)	North Greenville (6–1)	Benedict (7–1)	North Greenville (8–1)	Midwestern State (8–2)	East Stroudsburg (9–2)		19.
20.	Minnesota Duluth	Newberry (0–0)	Benedict (2–0)	Benedict (2–0)	Benedict (3–0)	Western Oregon (2–2)	Henderson State (5–0)	Carson–Newman (6–1)	Benedict (6–1)	East Stroudsburg (7–1)	Benedict (8–1)	Davenport (8–2)	Newberry (9–2)		20.
21.	Chadron State	Lenoir–Rhyne (1–0)	Ashland (0–1)	Davenport (3–0)	Northwood (3–0)	Central Missouri (3–1)	Mars Hill (5–0)	Edward Waters (5–1)	Johnson C. Smith (6–1)	Henderson State (7–1)	Augustana (SD) (7–2)	Ouachita Baptist (8–2)	Washburn (8–2–1)		21.
22.	Wingate	Benedict (1–0)	Emporia State (2–0)	Carson–Newman (3–0)	Carson–Newman (4–0)	Mars Hill (4–0)	Northern State (5–1)	North Greenville (5–1)	East Stroudsburg (6–1)	Virginia State (7–1)	Virginia Union (8–1)	Johnson C. Smith (8–2)	Grand Valley State (8–3)		22.
23.	Northeastern State	Fort Hays State (1–0)	Michigan Tech (2–0)	Northwood (2–0)	Shepherd (3–0)	Henderson State (4–0)	UT Permian Basin (4–1)	IUP (5–1)	Henderson State (6–1)	West Liberty (7–1)	Midwestern State (7–2)	Washburn (7–2–1)	Davenport (8–3)		23.
24.	Newberry	Minnesota Duluth (0–1)	Wayne State (NE) (2–0)	Lenoir–Rhyne (2–1)	North Greenville (3–0)	Kentucky State (4–1)	Michigan Tech (4–1)	Shepherd (5–1)	Wayne State (NE) (6–1)	Virginia Union (7–1)	Johnson C. Smith (7–2)	Newberry (8–2)	Johnson C. Smith (8–3)		24.
25.	Slippery Rock	Michigan Tech (1–0)	West Alabama (2–0)	Northern State (3–0)	Fort Hays State (3–1)	Northern State (4–1)	Edward Waters (5–1)	Johnson C. Smith (5–1)	Virginia State (7–1)	Augustana (SD) (6–2)	Ouachita Baptist (7–2)	North Greenville (8–2)	UNC Pembroke (9–2)		25.
	Preseason August 17	Week 1 August 31	Week 2 September 7	Week 3 September 14	Week 4 September 21	Week 5 September 28	Week 6 October 5	Week 7 October 12	Week 8 October 19	Week 9 October 26	Week 10 November 2	Week 11 November 9	Week 12 November 16	Week 13 (Final)	
		Dropped: Virginia Union; UT Permian Basin; Chadron State; Wingate	Dropped: Pittsburg State; Frostburg State; Lenoir–Rhyne; Fort Hays State	Dropped: Newberry; Indianapolis; Ashland; Michigan Tech; Wayne State (NE)	Dropped: West Alabama; Lenoir–Rhyne; Northern State	Dropped: Augustana (SD); Benedict; Carson–Newman; Shepherd; Fort Hays State	Dropped: Northeastern State; Western Oregon; Kentucky State	Dropped: Central Missouri; Mars Hill; Northern State	Dropped: UT Permian Basin; Edward Waters; IUP; Shepherd	Dropped: Grand Valley State; Johnson C. Smith; Wayne State (NE)	Dropped: Henderson State; Virginia State; West Liberty	Dropped: Carson–Newman; Minnesota Duluth	Dropped: Emporia State; North Greenville	None	
