= Plaster Stadium (Southwest Baptist) =

College football stadium in Bolivar, Missouri

Coordinates: 37.6021°N 93.4132°W

Plaster Stadium at SBU is a 3,000-capacity stadium in Bolivar, Missouri, United States, where it serves as home to Southwest Baptist University's football team. The stadium was completed in 1985 and is named for Robert W. Plaster, who was a major contributor to the project.
