= Southwest Baptist Bearcats football =

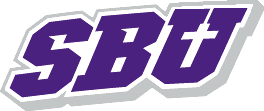
- First season: 1983; 43 years ago
- Head coach: Paul Hansen; 1st season,
- Location: Bolivar, Missouri
- Stadium: Plaster Stadium (capacity: 3,000)
- NCAA division: Division II
- Conference: Great Lakes Valley Conference
- Colors: Purple and white

Claimed national championships
- 0

Conference championships
- 1
- Website: sbubearcats.com/football

The Southwest Baptist University Bearcats football program represents Southwest Baptist University in college football and competes in the Division II level of the National Collegiate Athletic Association (NCAA). In 2014, Southwest Baptist became a football-only member of the Great Lakes Valley Conference and remains a football-only member through the 2018–19 school year, after which it will become a full GLVC member. Prior to this SBU was in the Mid-America Intercollegiate Athletics Association from 1988 to 2007 and 2012 to 2013, the rest of the athletic programs are in the MIAA. SBU's home games are played at Plaster Stadium in Bolivar, Missouri.

== History ==
Southwest Baptist's football program dates back to 1983 when the program went 0–5. Since their inaugural season the Bearcats have played in five conferences and have been an NCAA Division II member since 1986.

In 2016, Coach Robert Clardy earned GLVC Coach of the Year honors after leading the Bearcats to their first-ever conference title and NCAA National Playoff appearance after finishing the season 10–2 (7–1 GLVC). The 2016 Bearcats were ranked as high as 17th in the NCAA Division II AFCA poll, and were ranked 22nd in the final poll. SBU broke 13 team records and 15 individual records in the 2016 season, including most wins and most conference wins in a single season, while also recording a record 19 All-GLVC and 10 All-Region honorees. The Bearcats had three All-Americans and finished with the 10th best total offense in the NCAA Division II.

In 2018, the team went winless, finishing 0–10 while allowing over 38 points per game on defense.

Paul Hansen succeeded Clardy in 2025, becoming the 10th head football coach in SBU history.

== Conference affiliations ==
- 1983–1985 NAIA Independent
- 1986–1987 NCAA Division II Independent
- 1988–2007 Mid-America Intercollegiate Athletics Association
- 2007–2011 NCAA Division II Independent
- 2012–2013 Mid-America Intercollegiate Athletics Association
- 2014–present Great Lakes Valley Conference

== Playoff appearances ==
=== NCAA Division II ===
The Bearcats have made one appearance in the NCAA Division II playoffs, with a combined record of 0–1.

Year	Round	Opponent	Result
2016	First Round	Colorado Mines	L, 35–63

== Stadium ==
The Bearcats have played their home games at Plaster Stadium since 1985. Plaster Stadium was named for Robert W. Plaster, the major donor for the project. The current capacity of the stadium is at 3,000.
