= Brad Smiley =

American football coach (born 1973)

Current position
- Title: Head coach
- Team: Southern Arkansas
- Conference: GAC
- Record: 32–13

Biographical details
- Born: June 19, 1973 (age 53); Greenville, Texas, U.S.
- Education: Baylor University (1995); Northwestern State University (1997)

Coaching career (HC unless noted)
- 1995: Baylor (SA)
- 1996–1997: Northwestern State (TE)
- 1998–1999: Trinity Valley (OL/TE)
- 2000–2006: Tulane (RC/TE)
- 2007–2017: Trinity Valley
- 2018–2021: Northwestern State (OC/TE)
- 2022–present: Southern Arkansas

Head coaching record
- Overall: 110-52 (career); 32–13 (college); 78–39 (junior college)
- Bowls: 1–0 (college); 4–1 (junior college)

Accomplishments and honors

Championships
- 5 Conference (2013,2014,2015,2016,2017); 3 Region (2013,2014,2016)

Awards
- • 2014 American Football Magazine National Junior College Coach Of The Year • 2013 Conference Coach Of The Year • 2014 Conference Coach Of The Year • 2016 Conference Coach Of The Year

Brad Smiley (born June 19, 1973) is an American college football coach. He is the head football coach at Southern Arkansas University, a position he has held since 2022. He served as the head football coach at Trinity Valley Community College from 2007 to 2017. He also coached for Baylor, Northwestern State, and Tulane.

== Head coaching record ==
=== College ===
Year	Team	Overall	Conference	Standing	Bowl/playoffs
Southern Arkansas Muleriders (Great American Conference) (2022–present)
2022	Southern Arkansas	5–6	5–6	T–6th	
2023	Southern Arkansas	10–2	9–2	2nd	W Live United
2024	Southern Arkansas	9–2	9–2	3rd	
2025	Southern Arkansas	8–3	8–3	2nd	
2026	Southern Arkansas	0–0	0–0		
Southern Arkansas:		32–13	31–13		
Total:		32–13			

=== Junior college ===
Year	Team	Overall	Conference	Standing	Bowl/playoffs
Trinity Valley Cardinals (Southwest Junior College Football Conference) (2007–2017)
2007	Trinity Valley	2–7	0–6	7th	
2008	Trinity Valley	6–4	4–3	T–4th	L SWJCFC semifinal
2009	Trinity Valley	4–5	2–5		
2010	Trinity Valley	6–5	4–3		L SWJCFC championship
2011	Trinity Valley	8–3	6–1	2nd	L SWJCFC championship, L Citizen's Bank Bowl
2012	Trinity Valley	3-6	1-5	5th	
2013	Trinity Valley	10–2	5-1	1st	W SWJCFC championship, W C.H.A.M.P.S. Heart of Texas Bowl
2014	Trinity Valley	12–0	6–0	1st	W SWJCFC championship, W C.H.A.M.P.S. Heart of Texas Bowl
2015	Trinity Valley	7–3	5–1	1st	L SWJCFC semifinal
2016	Trinity Valley	11–1	6–1	1st	W SWJCFC championship, W C.H.A.M.P.S. Heart of Texas Bowl
2017	Trinity Valley	9–3	5–2	T–1st	L SWJCFC championship, W C.H.A.M.P.S. Heart of Texas Bowl
Trinity Valley:		78-39			
Total:		110–52			
National championship Conference title Conference division title or championship game berth
