= Mike Godfrey =

Playing career
- 1983–1984: Crowder
- 1985–1986: Missouri State
- Position: Pitcher

Coaching career (HC unless noted)
- 1987–1990: Crowder (Asst.)
- 1990–1992: Southern Arkansas (Asst.)
- 1993–2003: Neosho (Mo.) H.S.
- 2004–2005: Southern Arkansas
- 2006: Marshall (Mo.) H.S.
- 2007–2008: Ashdown (Ark.) H.S.
- 2009–present: Carthage (Mo.) H.S.

Head coaching record
- Overall: 79–40
- Tournaments: Gulf South: 4–4; NCAA: 2–2

Mike Godfrey is a former American college baseball coach who is currently serving as head coach of the Carthage (Missouri) High School baseball team.

== Playing career ==
Godfrey is a native of Seneca, Missouri and was a prep standout at Seneca (Mo.) High School. Godfrey continued his baseball career at Crowder College and at Missouri State University.

== Coaching career ==
Following the conclusion of his playing career, Godfrey began his very successful coaching career at Crowder College where he served from 1987 to 1990. Godfrey then moved to Southern Arkansas where he served as the pitching coach under legendary SAU coach Steve Goodheart from 1990 to 1992. The 1991 Southern Arkansas baseball team had one of its most successful seasons as they qualified for the NAIA World Series. In between his stops at SAU he was a very successful coach at Neosho (Mo.) High School. Prior to the 2004 season, Godfrey was hired to replace Steve Goodheart. During his two seasons at SAU, Godfrey was able to continue the success that Goodheart had begun. Godfrey's best team was his first finishing the 2004 season with a 45–15 overall record and losing to the eventual NCAA Division II National Champion Delta State Statesmen in the Gulf South Conference tournament title game. At the conclusion of the 2005 season, Godfrey resigned from SAU to return to high school baseball and to be able to spend more time with his family. Since SAU, Godfrey has led three high school programs and is currently the coach of the Carthage (Mo.) High School baseball team.

=== Head coaching record ===
Record table
Season	Team	Overall	Conference	Standing	Postseason
Southern Arkansas Muleriders (Gulf South Conference) (2004–2005)
2004	Southern Arkansas	45–15	19–5	2nd (West)	NCAA South-Central Regional
2005	Southern Arkansas	34–25	15–9	3rd (West)	
Southern Arkansas:		79–40	73–32		
Total:		79–40			
National champion Postseason invitational champion Conference regular season champion Conference regular season and conference tournament champion Division regular season champion Division regular season and conference tournament champion Conference tournament champion
