= Southern Arkansas Muleriders football =

2026 Southern Arkansas Muleriders football team
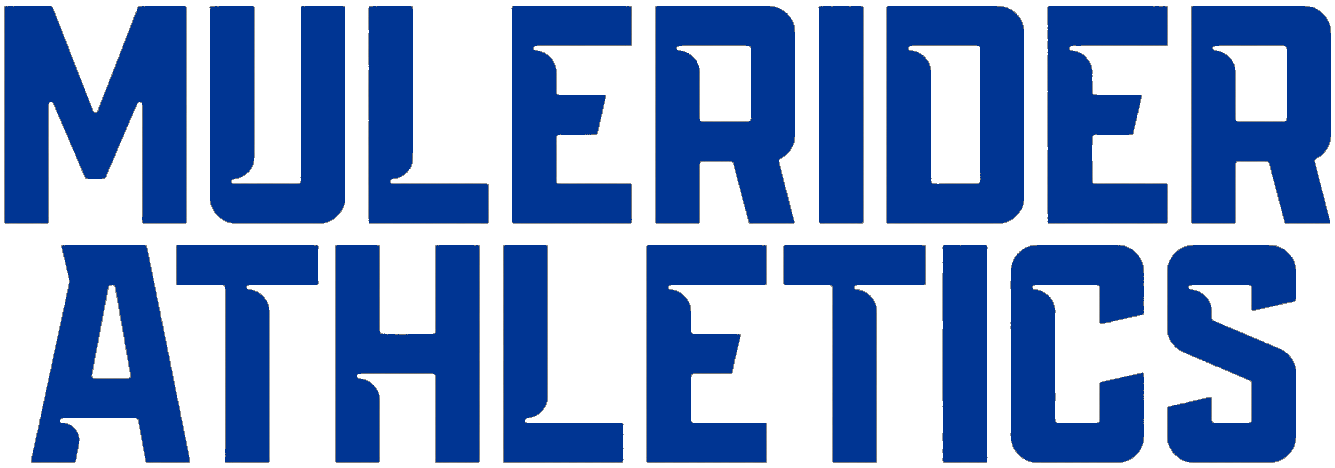
- First season: 1911; 115 years ago
- Athletic director: Steve Browning
- Head coach: Brad Smiley; 5th season, 32–13 (.711)
- Location: Magnolia, Arkansas
- Stadium: Wilkins Stadium (capacity: 6,000)
- Field: Rip Powell Field
- NCAA division: Division II
- Conference: Great American (since 2012)
- Colors: Royal blue and gold
- All-time record: 506–459–30 (.524)
- Bowl record: 3–4–1 (.438)

Conference championships
- 8 (1926, 1927, 1929, 1948, 1951, 1952, 1972, 1997)
- Consensus All-Americans: 70
- Rivalries: UAM Boll Weevils
- Fight song: SAU Fight Song
- Mascot: Molly Ann & the Mulerider
- Website: muleriderathletics.com/football

The Southern Arkansas Muleriders football team represents Southern Arkansas University (SAU) in the sport of American football. The Southern Arkansas Muleriders compete in Division II of the National Collegiate Athletic Association (NCAA) and in the Great American Conference.

SAU begin competing in 1911 when they were known as the Third District Agricultural School. Early Mulerider teams played local junior college and high school teams. The Muleriders are inaugural members of the Great American Conference. SAU has competed in the NCAA Division II since 1995 after spending almost 50 years as members of the NAIA.

Mulerider football teams have won 8 conference championships, participated in four college bowl games (2–1–1 record), and have made the NCAA Division II Playoffs in two seasons (0–2 record). SAU has produced 70 All-Americans and 172 First Team All-Conference players.

The Muleriders' home stadium is Wilkins Stadium which opened in 1949. Wilkins Stadium features dual grandstands with seating for 6,000. Several renovations have been done to Wilkins Stadiums over the past few years. Artificial turf was recently installed and new ticket booths and concessions stands were added. Also on site at Wilkins Stadium is the Auburn Smith Field House which houses the SAU coaches offices, locker room, and training room.

== History ==
=== Pre-NCAA history (1911–1994) ===
==== AIC era ====
Prior to joining NCAA Division II football, the Muleriders were an inaugural member of the Arkansas Intercollegiate Conference which featured several non-scholarship programs from the state of Arkansas. Six of these programs continue to be conference mates today. SAU saw varying periods of success during their years in the AIC. SAU fielded 61 teams during their time in the AIC and left the conference with a 309–270–25 record. The late 1920s were good to the Muleriders as the team won the AIC Championship in 1926, 1927, and 1929. The 1929 squad is the last team to finish a season unbeaten. The 1930s and 1940 saw years that SAU did not field a team. Many schools took off the World War II years due to the demands that war brought. However, by 1946 football was back at SAU to stay. Elmer Smith was hired to lead the program. Elmer Smith was able to duplicate the success of the late 1920s winning AIC Championships in 1948, 1951, & 1952. Coach Smith left the university to join Paul "Bear" Bryant's staff at the University of Alabama following the 1953 season. Coach Smith finished at SAU with a 54–27–2 record.

In 1954, Auburn Smith (no relation to Elmer Smith) was promoted from assistant football coach to the head coaching position. This began the longest tenured coach in SAU history. Auburn Smith guided the Mulerider program for 15 seasons and retired with the most wins in school history. Upon his retirement, Smith served as the athletic director for several years. The field house at Wilkins Stadium was named in his honor in 1995.

Raymond "Rip" Powell was named as Smith's replacement and proceeded to lead SAU into the best five-year period in the programs history. From 1971 to 1975, Powell's squads compiled a 38–13–1 record and won the 1972 AIC Championship. Powell wasn't able to continue the success that he found at the beginning of his career and he retired following the 1978 season. Following Powell's retirement, SAU's program entered into a period of instability. Coaches rarely stayed more than a couple years and 8 win seasons were followed by 1 win seasons. There were bright spots. The 1981 squad, coached by Jimmy "Red" Parker reached the No. 1 ranking before finishing the season 7–3. In 1990, the Muleriders traveled to the Aztec Bowl in Mexico where they beat the Mexican All-Star team 41–31.

At the conclusion of the 1994–1995 season, the AIC folded. Most of the schools had already moved from the NAIA to the NCAA ranks. SAU joined several other Arkansas institutions to form the Western Division of the Gulf South Conference. This marked the end of a period in SAU's athletic history. Following this, the SAU football team experienced a series of successful seasons.

=== NCAA history (1995–present) ===
==== GSC (1995–2011) ====
SAU was in a transitional period during the 1995 & 1996 seasons. However, any fears that Mulerider fans has about SAU's ability to compete at the NCAA Division II level were put to rest during the 1997 season. Coach Steve Roberts led SAU to the Gulf South Conference Championship in 1997 with an overall record of 9–2. The 1998 & 1999 seasons were equally successful as SAU finished 8–2 & 9–1. The 1999 squad lost their final contest to eventual GSC Champions Arkansas Tech in overtime. A win would have earn SAU their first unbeaten season in 70 years and would have given SAU their 2nd GSC Conference championship in their first three years in the league. Following the 1999 season, Coach Roberts was hired by Northwestern (LA) State.

Following Roberts at SAU was John Bland who coached the Muleriders to a 5–5 record in 2000, his only season at the helm. Steve Quinn replaced Bland and led the Muleriders for the next 8 seasons. The 2003 squad was Quinn's most successful. The 2003 squad finished 9–3 and made the NCAA Division II playoffs where they lost to GSC conference foe North Alabama. After three consecutive losing seasons to finish his tenure at SAU, current head coach Bill Keopple was hired to replace Quinn. Keopple's first season in Magnolia was SAU's final season in the Gulf South Conference.

==== GAC (2011–present) ====
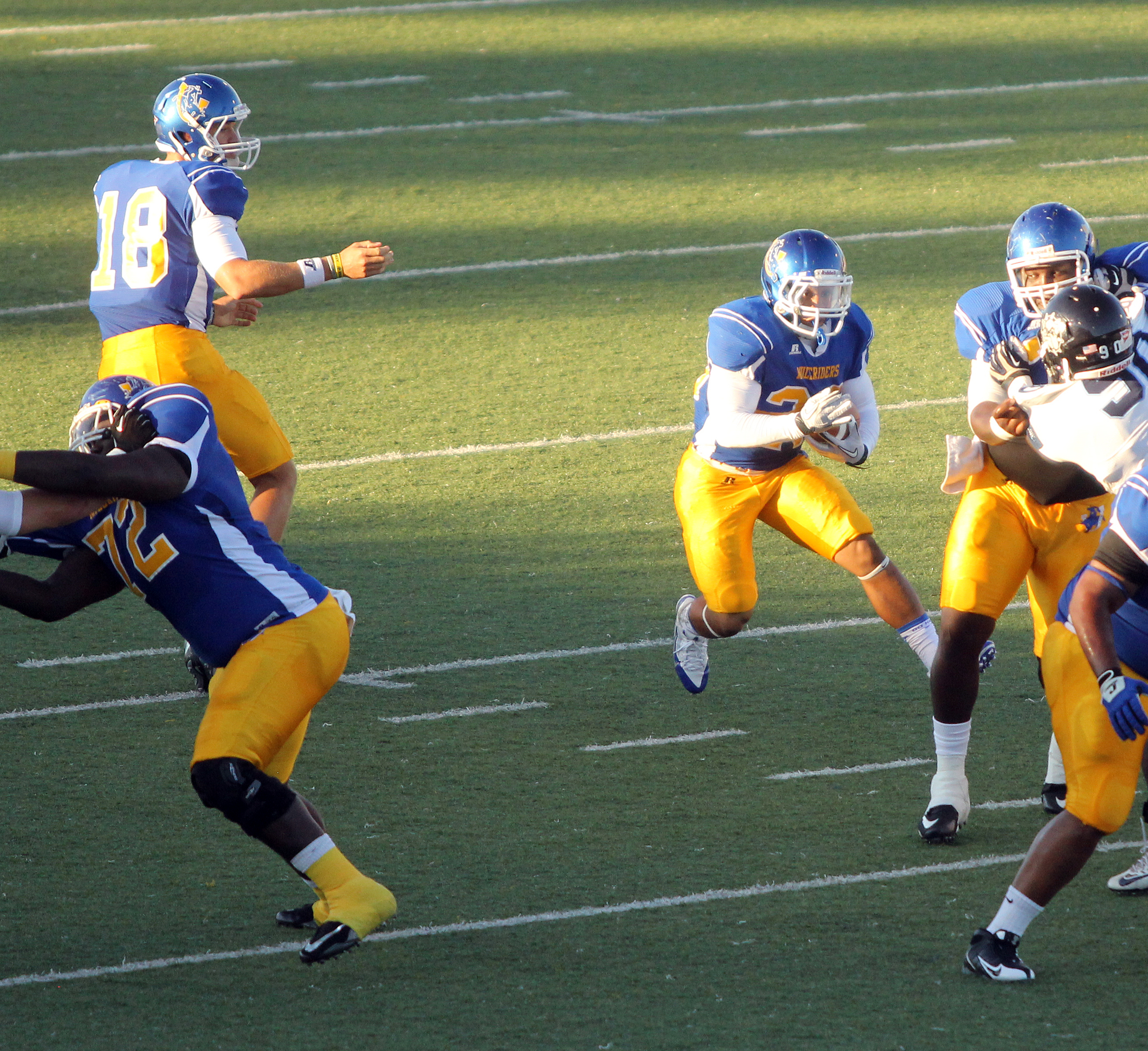
Southern Arkansas in a 2013 game

In 2011, SAU, five other Arkansas colleges, and four Oklahoma colleges joined forces to become the Great American Conference. Leading the SAU team into the new conference was 3rd year head coach Bill Keopple. Keopple came to SAU after several years as a college assistant as well as a successful high school head coach. He brought with him an uptempo offense and multiple defense. The 2011 teams showed improvement on the field but finished the season with a 3–7 record.

In 2012, the improvement was shown in a major way. Behind the inspired play of the offense, led by All-Americans Tyler Sykora, Mark Johnson, & Don Unamba, the Muleriders finished the season 8–3 and participated in the C.H.A.M.P.S Heart of Texas Bowl where the fell to McMurry 36–35. The 2013 season had high expectations with many of the starters from the 2012 squad returning. SAU stumbled out of the gate and finished the season 6–4. Despite the drop off in wins, SAU finished with consecutive winning records for the first time since 2002–2003.

== Postseason appearances ==
=== NCAA Division II playoffs ===
The Muleriders have made two appearances in the NCAA Division II playoffs, with a combined record of 0–2.

Year	Round	Opponent	Result
1997	First Round	Albany State	L, 6–10
2003	First Round	North Alabama	L, 24–48

=== Bowls ===
Southern Arkansas teams have been invited to participate in six bowls and have an overall bowl record of 3–4–1. The Muleriders most recent bowl appearance was in 2023 when the competing in the Farmer’s Bank & Trust Live United Bowl in Texarkana, Arkansas.

Season	Coach	Bowl	Opponent	Result
1947	Elmer Smith	Cajun Bowl	John McNeese (LA) JC	T 0–0
1948	Elmer Smith	Papoose Bowl	Eastern Oklahoma State	W 41–12
1990	Don Tumey	Aztec Bowl	Mexican All-Stars	W 41–31
2012	Bill Keopple	Heart of Texas Bowl	McMurry (TX)	L 35–36
2016	Bill Keopple	Agent Barry Live United Bowl	Texas A&M-Kingsville	L 17–24
2018	Bill Keopple	Agent Barry Live United Bowl	Missouri Western	L 25–30
2019	Bill Keopple	Heritage Bowl	Eastern New Mexico	L 13–20
2023	Brad Smiley	Farmer’s Bank & Trust Live United Bowl	Missouri Western	W 43-27

== Rivalries ==
Southern Arkansas plays its annual rivalry game, "The Battle of the Timberlands", against the University of Arkansas at Monticello Boll Weevils. The rivalry dates back to 1913 and the winning team is awarded a traveling trophy. SAU leads the series 55–35–1.

== Head coaches ==
=== Current coaching staff ===
Name	Position	Year entering
Brad Smiley	Head Coach	5th
Dionte Dean	Defensive Coordinator	4th
Kyle Washington	Offensive Coordinator	4th
Yancey Vanosdell	Offensive Line	1st
TJ Langley	Defensive Line	6th
Wyatt Smith	Wide Receivers	2nd
Dylan Teague	Linebackers	1st
Nate Henry	Safeties	1st

=== Coaching history ===
SAU has had 21 head coaches since it began play in 1911. Brad Smiley is the current head coach, named to this role on December 6, 2021. Bill Keopple won more games than any other SAU coach, with 65 wins. G.W. Bacot, Arvil Green, and Jimmy (Red) Parker each won at least 70% of the contests they coached.

Name	Games	Wins	Losses	Ties	Pct.	First year	Last year	Total years
G.R. Turrentine	35	11	21	3	0.357	1911	1917	7
J.W. Gardner	8	8	0	0	1.000	1918	1919	1
A.J. Anderson	16	6	10	0	0.375	1920	1921	2
A.L. Ahrens	8	3	5	0	0.375	1922	1922	1
Sage McLean	117	51	54	12	0.487	1923	1936	14
Arvil Green	18	13	4	1	0.750	1940	1941	2
Elmer Smith	83	54	27	2	0.663	1946	1953	8
Auburn Smith	141	63	76	2	0.454	1954	1968	15
Raymond "Rip" Powell	102	62	38	2	0.618	1969	1978	10
Sam Goodwin	21	9	11	1	0.452	1979	1980	2
Jimmy "Red" Parker	10	7	3	0	0.700	1981	1981	1
Steve Arnett	40	20	18	2	0.525	1982	1985	4
Rob Hicklin	41	13	26	2	0.341	1986	1989	4
Don Tumey	44	22	21	1	0.511	1990	1993	4
Steve Roberts	60	35	24	1	0.592	1994	1999	6
John Bland	10	5	5	0	0.500	2000	2000	1
Steve Quinn	86	39	47	0	0.453	2001	2008	8
Bill Keopple	118	65	53	0	0.551	2009	2020*	11
Mike McCarty	11	4	7	0	0.364	2021	2021	1
Brad Smiley	45	32	13	0	0.711	2022		4

- 2020 football season cancelled due to the COVID-19 Pandemic.

== Award winners ==
Through the 2013 season, 70 Muleriders have been named All-American with over 150 Muleriders have been named All-Conference. The following players and coaches have won individual awards.

Gulf South Conference Coach of the Year

- 1997 – Steve Roberts

Gulf South Conference Defensive Player of the Year

- 1997 – Fred Perry, LB

Gulf South Conference Freshman of the Year

- 2011 – Mark Johnson, RB

Great American Conference Freshman of the Year

- 2015 – Barrett Renner, QB
- 2021 - Jariq Scales, RB

== Muleriders at NFL and CFL ==
There have been 9 Muleriders who have played professional football in the National Football League and the Canadian Football League.

=== SAU Players ===
- Tommy Tuberville
- Charlie McClendon

=== Professional Players ===
Player	Pos.	Tenure	Team
Dennis Woodberry	DB	1986–1988	Atlanta Falcons, Washington Redskins
Greg Stumon	DE/LB	1986–1995	British Columbia Lions, Edmonton Eskimos, Ottawa Rough Riders, Shreveport Pirates
Kenneth Brown	WR	1987	Cincinnati Bengals
David Ward	LB	1987	New England Patriots
Fred Perry	DE/LB	1999–2009	Toronto Argonauts, Edmonton Eskimos, Ottawa Renegades, Calgary Stampeders, Saskatchewan Roughriders, Winnipeg Blue Bombers
Jordan Babineaux	DB	2004–2012	Seattle Seahawks, Tennessee Titans
Nik Lewis	WR	2004–2017	Calgary Stampeders
Kenneth Pettway	DE	2005–2012	Houston Texans, Jacksonville Jaguars, Green Bay Packers, Edmonton Eskimos, Calgary Stampeders
Cedric Thornton	DT	2011–2017	Dallas Cowboys, Buffalo Bills
Don Unamba	DB	2014–2021	Winnipeg Blue Bombers, Saskatchewan Roughriders, Montreal Alouettes, Hamilton Tiger-Cats
Tanner Hudson	TE	2018–present	Tampa Bay Buccaneers, San Francisco 49ers, New York Giants, Cincinnati Bengals

== Traditions ==
=== School colors ===
SAU's school colors of Royal Blue and Old Gold were chosen in honor of the Farmer's Union. The union paved the way for the Third District Agricultural School to be founded in Magnolia in 1909.

=== Nickname and Logo ===
Southern Arkansas's athletic teams have gone by several nicknames during the years. Names include "Aggies", "Burros", "Mulettes", "Kats" and "Riderettes" before becoming the Muleriders/Lady Muleriders officially. The Mulerider nickname is regularly called one of the most unusual nicknames in college athletics. There are several versions of how the Muleriders became the nickname of SAU. The university has accepted the following legend of the nickname:

Shortly after Thanksgiving in 1912, young men from the football team of the Third District Agricultural School (TDAS) rode mules to Coach George Ruford Turrentine’s home north of the campus at Magnolia, Arkansas. It was not unusual for young men in the rural South to ride mules; as the animal used most often in Southern agriculture, they were easily available. In that year’s final game, they had played a scoreless tie game with Fordyce High School at TDAS on “Turkey Day,” November 28, and they wanted to talk over the season with the coach. In the school’s early years, football teams may have ridden mules occasionally to reach McNeil, five miles north of TDAS. It was there that they caught the Cotton Belt train to away games. There were only four automobiles in Columbia County in 1912 and no paved roads. Muddy roads in flooding weather conditions made travel difficult, even by wagon. Riding a mule was a more reliable means of transportation.
A few days after the Fordyce game, Coach Turrentine invited the players to dinner at his home, also located on the road to McNeil. As the riders dismounted in his yard, Turrentine walked onto his porch and shouted a greeting, “My Mule Riders!” This was the first known occasion when the name Mule Riders was used for the football team. Over time, it became more than the team’s name. Among all the nation’s institutions of higher education, the name has been uniquely associated with the school established in 1909. Over the next century, only TDAS and its three successor institutions—Magnolia A&M College, Southern State College, and Southern Arkansas University—embraced Mule Riders as a symbol for athletic teams, mascots, students, and alumni.

The western style bronco-breaking rider on a bucking mule first appeared atop The Bray student newspaper masthead in 1949–1950.

=== Mascot ===
Molly Ann is the official mascot of the SAU Muleriders. Molly Ann is a full-size American mule ridden by a "mule rider". Molly Ann can be found at football games, "Mulegates", and other campus events.

Molly Ann replaced longtime mascot Molly B following Molly B's death on March 5, 2013. Molly B was the official mascot for 20 years.

=== Mulegating ===
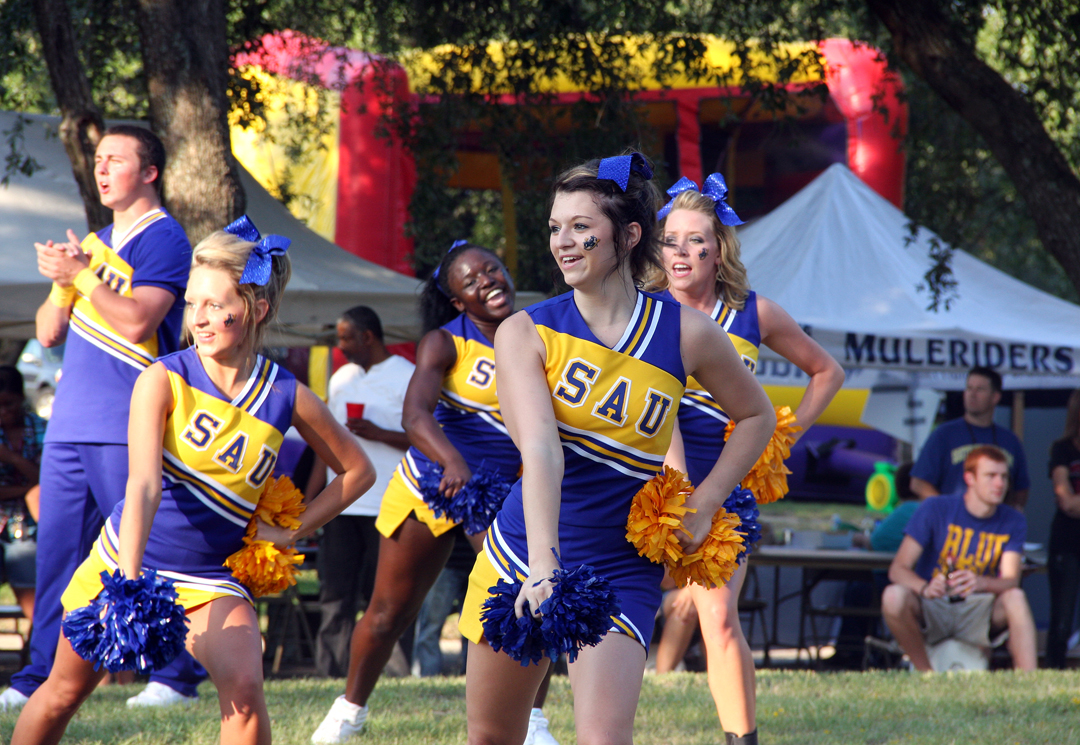
Mulegating in 2013

"Mulegating" is a family-oriented event that gets Mulerider football fans geared up for every home SAU football game. Mulegating got its start in September, 2003, after the opening of the SAU Welcome Center. The SAU version of tailgating, students, family, and friends of SAU gather to visit, eat, and prepare for the upcoming game.

The event is hosted by the university's Office of Alumni Relations, and there is always a variety of grilled food, as well as games for the children.

== Championships ==
=== Conference ===
Southern Arkansas has won a total of 8 conference championships, including 2 in an early conference that included Arkansas junior colleges and high schools, 5 AIC Championships and 1 GSC Championships.

Conference affiliations:

- 1913–1916, Independent
- 1917–1918, No team fielded
- 1919–1928, Independent
- 1929–1941, Arkansas Intercollegiate Conference
- 1942–1944, No team due to WWII
- 1945–1994, Arkansas Intercollegiate Conference
- 1995–2011, Gulf South Conference
- 2011–present, Great American Conference

Year	Conference	Coach	Overall record
1926	AIC	Sage McLean	6–1–2
1927	AIC	Sage McLean	7–2–1
1929	AIC	Sage McLean	7–0–2
1948†	AIC	Elmer Smith	8–2
1951	AIC	Elmer Smith	9–1
1952	AIC	Elmer Smith	10–1
1972†	AIC	Raymond "Rip" Powell	8–2
1997†	GSC	Steve Roberts	9–2
Total conference championships:			8
† Denotes co-champions
