= Steve Goodheart =

Playing career
- 1973–1976: Southern Arkansas

Coaching career (HC unless noted)
- 1977: Southern Arkansas (Student Asst.)
- 1978: Camden (Ark.) Fairview H.S.
- 1979–1980: University of Arizona (Grad. Asst.)
- 1981–2003: Southern Arkansas

Head coaching record
- Overall: 764–406–5
- Tournaments: NAIA World Series: 3–6; Gulf South: 7–12

Accomplishments and honors

Championships
- AIC Championships: 1983, 1986, 1987, 1988, 1989, 1990, 1991, 1992, 1994, 1995; NAIA Area Champions: 1983, 1991; NAIA District 17 Championships: 1983, 1987, 1988, 1989, 1991, 1992, 1994, 1995

Steve Goodheart is a retired American college baseball coach, who served as head coach of the Southern Arkansas Muleriders baseball team from 1981–2003. During his career he led SAU to a 764–406–5 record, making him the second winningest coach all-time among Arkansas college baseball coaches. Goodheart trails only retired University of Arkansas coach Norm DeBriyn's 1,161 wins.

== Playing career ==
Goodheart came to SAU, then known as Southern State College, from Great Falls, MT and was a four-year letterwinner for the Muleriders. During his playing career at SAU, Goodheart was a part of two AIC Championship teams (1974 & 1975) and was an All-Conference player in 1975. Goodheart was an AIC All-Star in both 1975 and 1976.

== Coaching career ==
=== College Assistant & High School Coaching Career ===
Following his playing career, Goodheart got his start as a student assistant coach at SAU for the 1977 season, during which Muleriders won their third AIC Championship in four years. After one year as a student assistant at SAU, Goodheart moved to Camden (Ark.) Fairview High School where he served as the head baseball coach during the 1978 season. After one year at Camden Fairview, Goodheart moved to the University of Arizona to serve as a graduate assistant under National College Baseball Hall of Famer Jerry Kindall. During Goodheart's two seasons in Tucson, the Wildcats compiled an 88–46–1 record and won the 1980 College World Series title.

=== Southern Arkansas Muleriders ===
After the 1980 season, Goodheart was hired by his alma mater to replace Dr. Jack Harrington as the head coach of the Muleriders. Goodheart retired in 2003 as the winningest coach in school history.

Goodheart won 19 championships during his career at SAU. As head coach, his Muleriders were AIC champions in 1983, 1986, 1987, 1988, 1989, 1990, 1991, 1992, 1994, and 1995. Three of his SAU teams made appearances in the NAIA World Series (1983, 1987, 1991). The 1987 team finished third in the World Series with a record of 46–7. Goodheart's teams also won six district titles and 2 area titles. According to a press release when Goodheart was elected into the Southern Arkansas University Sports Hall of Fame:

“More than 50 of Goodheart’s former players have signed to play professional baseball. He has coached 54 first-team All-AIC players, 26 first-team NAIA District 17 players, five NAIA All-Area players, 12 NAIA Southwest Region selections, 17 NAIA All-Americans, one NAIA Academic All-American, two Cliff Shaw Scholar-Athlete Award winners, 33 All-Gulf South Conference choices, 10 NCAA All-South Central Region selections, and two NCAA All-Americans.”

Perhaps the most important accomplishment of Goodheart's career was overseeing SAU's transition from NAIA to the NCAA ranks. Not only were Goodheart's teams able to make the jump, the teams proceeded to win at an even higher level.

=== Head coaching record ===
Record table
Season	Team	Overall	Conference	Standing	Postseason
Southern Arkansas Muleriders (Arkansas Intercollegiate Conference) (1981–1995)
1981	Southern Arkansas	11–30			
1982	Southern Arkansas	11–17			
1983	Southern Arkansas	37–13			NAIA World Series
1984	Southern Arkansas	5–37			
1985	Southern Arkansas	25–20			
1986	Southern Arkansas	36–12			
1987	Southern Arkansas	46–7			NAIA World Series
1988	Southern Arkansas	43–13			
1989	Southern Arkansas	33–23–1			
1990	Southern Arkansas	27–23			
1991	Southern Arkansas	44–15–1			NAIA World Series
1992	Southern Arkansas	35–26			
1993	Southern Arkansas	43–14			
1994	Southern Arkansas	41–16–1			
1995	Southern Arkansas	40–14			
Southern Arkansas:		477–280–3			
Southern Arkansas Muleriders (Gulf South Conference) (1996–2003)
1996	Southern Arkansas	42–15	10–4	2nd (West)	
1997	Southern Arkansas	33–16	12–6	2nd (West)	
1998	Southern Arkansas	32–16	8–9	5th (West)	
1999	Southern Arkansas	36–17	12–5	2nd (West)	
2000	Southern Arkansas	25–16–2	11–5–1	2nd (West)	
2001	Southern Arkansas	39–15	15–8	2nd (West)	
2002	Southern Arkansas	42–14	17–5	2nd (West)	
2003	Southern Arkansas	38–17	24–8	2nd (West)	
Southern Arkansas:		287–126–2	109–50–1		
Total:		764–406–5			
National champion Postseason invitational champion Conference regular season champion Conference regular season and conference tournament champion Division regular season champion Division regular season and conference tournament champion Conference tournament champion
