= Steve Browning =

American college baseball coach

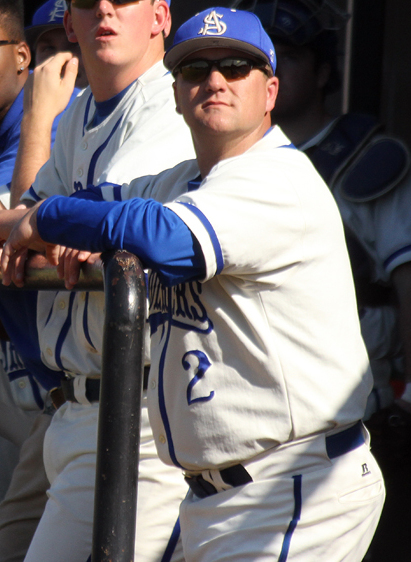
- Browning as coach of the Southern Arkansas Muleriders baseball team in 2013

Current position
- Title: Athletic Director
- Team: Southern Arkansas
- Conference: Great American

Biographical details
- Education: Southern Arkansas

Playing career
- 1997–1998: Crowder
- 1999–2000: Southern Arkansas
- Position: OF

Coaching career (HC unless noted)
- 2001–2002: Southern Arkansas (Student Asst.)
- 2003–2005: Southern Arkansas (Grad. Asst.)
- 2006–2010: Southern Arkansas (Asst.)
- 2011–2016: Southern Arkansas

Administrative career (AD unless noted)
- 2016–present: Southern Arkansas

Head coaching record
- Overall: 224–107
- Tournaments: GSC: 4–1; GAC: 16–6; NCAA: 5–10

Accomplishments and honors

Championships
- 1 – GSC Tournament Championship (2011); 3 – GAC Regular Season Championships (2012, 2013, 2015); 4 – GAC Tournament Championships (2012, 2013, 2014, 2015)

Awards
- 2012 GAC Coach of the Year

Steve Browning is an American former college baseball coach, currently serving as Athletic Director of the Southern Arkansas Muleriders. He was named to that position in the fall of 2012.

== Pre-collegiate coaching ==
A native of Sheridan, Arkansas, Browning played two seasons at Crowder College in Neosho, Missouri before completing his eligibility at Southern Arkansas. Browning was a starter in the outfield during both his seasons at SAU and was a co-captain during his senior year. Browning hit .314 with 17 doubles, four home runs and 52 RBI in his two seasons for the Muleriders. Following his successful baseball playing career, Browning began his coaching career as a student assistant at SAU.

== Collegiate coaching career ==
Browning spent ten seasons serving as a student assistant, graduate assistant, and assistant coach before being named head coach following the 2010 season. During his time at SAU, he has been a part of nine NCAA Regional teams and help guide the Muleriders to four regular season championships and six conference tournament titles. As the head coach, Browning has led all four of his teams to the conference tournament title with each receiving a bid to the NCAA Division II baseball tournament. Browning has had five players drafted into Major League Baseball. He has coached 18 first-team all-conference players, 16 second-team and honorable mention All-Conference players, nine All-Region players, three All-American selections, three Conference Freshmen of the Year, one Conference Pitcher of the Year, and one Conference Player of the Year.

Following the conclusion of the 2016 baseball season, SAU president Dr. Trey Berry announced that Browning would assume the full-time Athletic Director position.

=== Head coaching record ===
Record table
Season	Team	Overall	Conference	Standing	Postseason
Southern Arkansas Muleriders (Gulf South Conference) (2011–2011)
2011	Southern Arkansas	36–16	15–6	2nd (West)	NCAA South Central Regional
Southern Arkansas Muleriders (Great American Conference) (2012–present)
2012	Southern Arkansas	37–17	17–7	1st	NCAA South Central Regional
2013	Southern Arkansas	42–17	23–7	1st	NCAA Central Regional
2014	Southern Arkansas	39–19	18–12	3rd	NCAA Central Regional
2015	Southern Arkansas	40–18	20–10	1st	NCAA Central Regional
2016	Southern Arkansas	30–20	19–14	5th	
Southern Arkansas:		224–107 (.677)	112–56 (.667)		
Total:		224–107 (.677)			
National champion Postseason invitational champion Conference regular season champion Conference regular season and conference tournament champion Division regular season champion Division regular season and conference tournament champion Conference tournament champion
