= Southern Arkansas Muleriders =

- University: Southern Arkansas University
- NCAA: Division II
- Conference: Great American Conference
- Athletic director: Steve Browning
- Location: Magnolia, Arkansas
- Varsity teams: 16 (8 men's, 8 women's)
- Football stadium: Wilkins Stadium (capacity: 6,000)
- Basketball arena: W.T. Watson Athletic Center (capacity: 2,500)
- Baseball stadium: Walker Stadium at Goodheart Field (capacity: 1,000)
- Nickname: Muleriders/Lady Muleriders
- Colors: Royal blue and gold
- Mascot: Molly Ann
- Fight song: SAU Fight Song
- Website: muleriderathletics.com
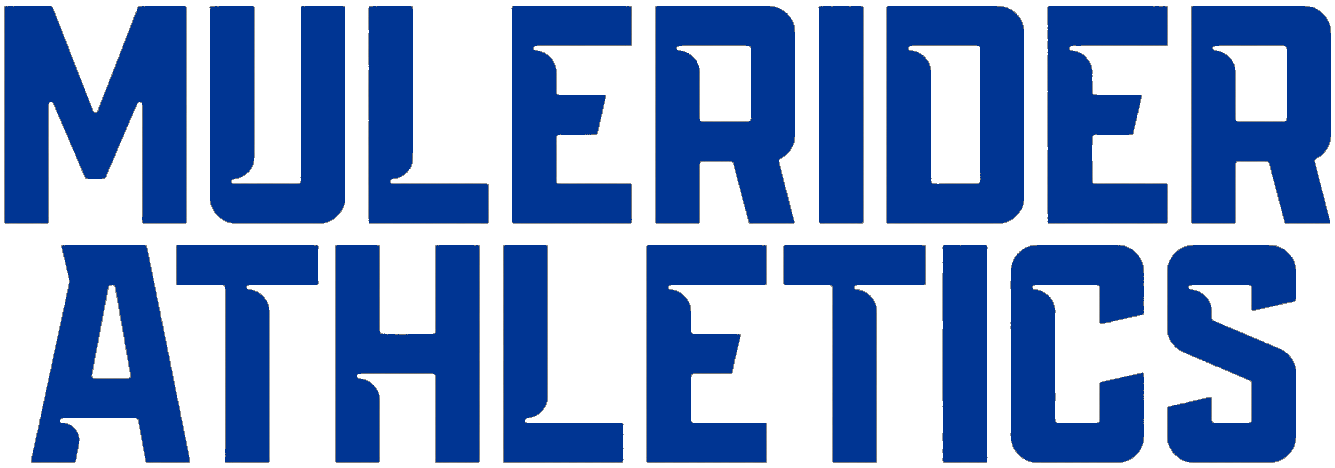

The Southern Arkansas Muleriders represent Southern Arkansas University in intercollegiate athletics. They are a member of the Great American Conference and compete in NCAA Division II, fielding 16 varsity teams in 10 sports.

== Sports sponsored ==
| Men's sports | Women's sports |
|---|---|
| Baseball | Basketball |
| Basketball | Cross country |
| Cross country | Golf |
| Football | Rodeo |
| Golf | Softball |
| Rodeo | Tennis |
| Tennis | Track & Field |
| Track & Field | Volleyball |

=== Men's basketball ===
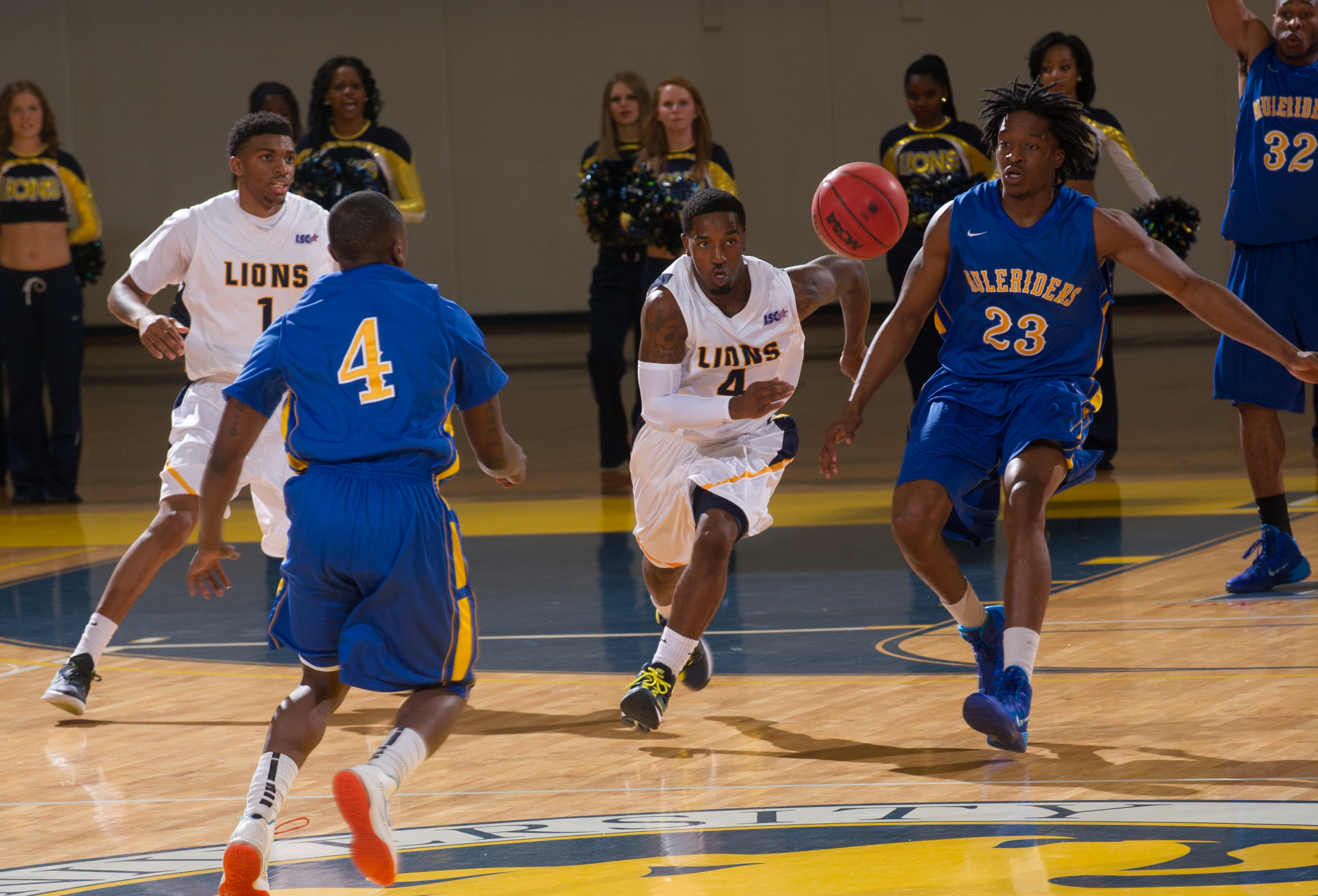
The Muleriders men's basketball team in action against the Texas A&M–Commerce Lions in 2013

SAU has been playing men's basketball since the school was formed in 1911. The winningest coach in Mulerider history was Coach W.T. Watson. Serving as coach from 1965 to 1980, Watson compiled a record of 300–151. Watson's teams won championships in 1966, 1967, and 1971.

Watson was named athletic director in 1980 and was replaced as basketball coach by Monroe Ingram. Ingram, a former Mulerider baseball coach, led the Mulerider basketball program from 1980 until his retirement in 1997. Ingram went 257–193 won the AIC in 1990. Since Ingram retired in 1997 SAU has seen its share of ups and downs. Brian Daugherty served the Muleriders for 7 years from 1998 to 2005 followed by Eric Bozeman from 2005 to 2012. SAU is looking to achieve new heights in 2012–2013. Andy Sharpe was introduced as the new Mulerider head coach on April 9, 2012. Sharpe brings a career record of 168–70 to SAU.

=== Women's basketball ===
Women's basketball can trace it roots to Coach Sam McLean's 1922 Burros. However, it was Coach Margaret Downing who put the Lady Muleriders on the basketball map. Downing coached the Lady Muleriders from 1965 until 1984. Her teams compiled a record of 231–155 over her last 18 seasons. Downing's teams won the AAU and Arkansas Women's Extramural Sports Association (AWESA) title in 1966, and the Arkansas Women's Intercollegiate Sports Associate (AWISA) in 1969–70, 1970–71, 1971–72, 1973–74, 1974–75, 1975–76, 1976–77. In total, Downing brought 10 championships to the Lady Mulerider basketball program.

=== Baseball ===
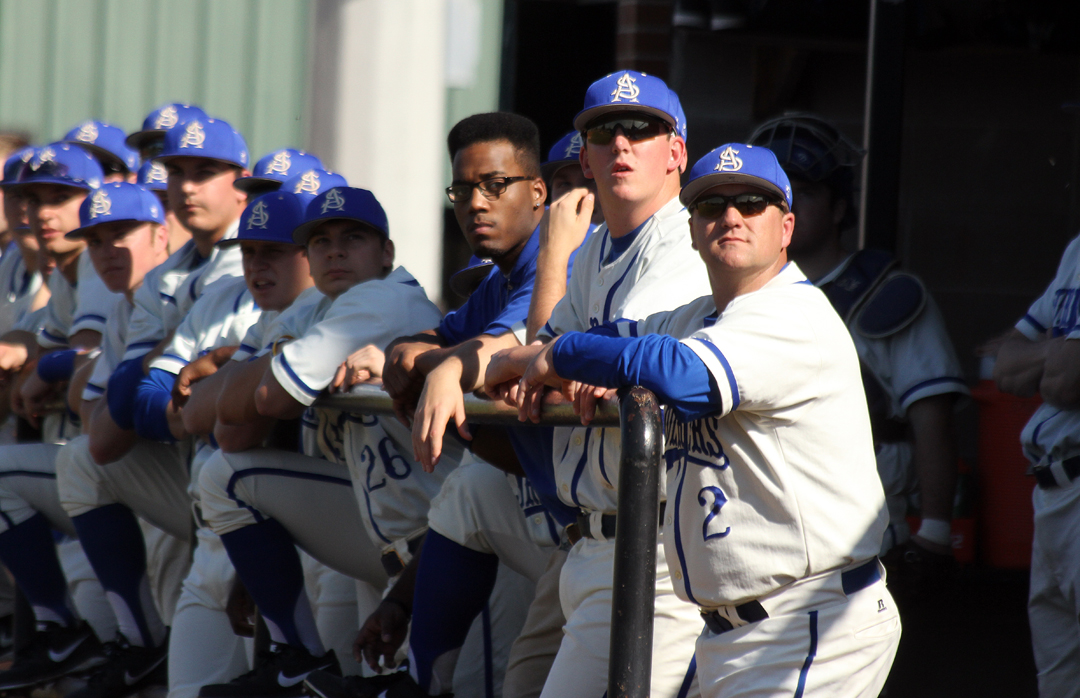
The Mulerider baseball team in 2013

Baseball has been the most consistent winner among the SAU athletic department. Since 1950, SAU has a record of 1,641–984–6. The Muleriders have won 25 conference titles, made 11 NCAA tournament appearances, and 3 NAIA World Series appearances. The current head coach of the Mulerider baseball team is Justin Pettigrew. He led the Muleriders to the 2017 Great American Conference championship.

=== Football ===
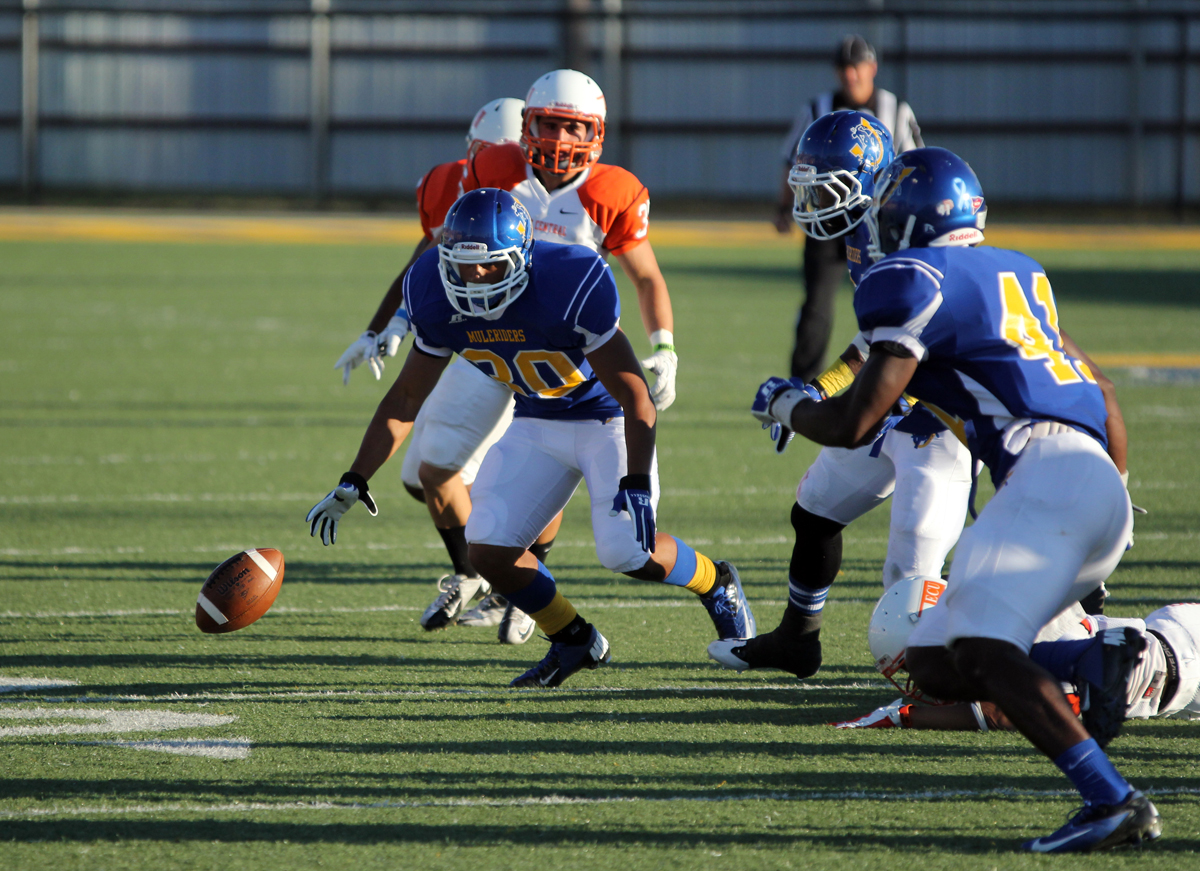
Southern Arkansas v East Central game in 2013

Southern Arkansas University began its football program in 1911 when the school was known as the Third District Agricultural School. The Muleriders first conference affiliation came in 1930 when the school joined the Arkansas Intercollegiate Conference.

SAU competed in the AIC until moving from NAIA to the NCAA Division II in 1995. Upon joining the NCAA, SAU competed in the Western Division of the Gulf South Conference. In 2011, SAU along with nine other colleges in Arkansas and Oklahoma joined the Great American Conference.

Before starting play in 2012, SAU had an all-time record of 429–413–30 (.509). The Muleriders have won five conference titles (1948, 1951, 1952, 1972, 1997). Bill Koepple is in his 4th season as the Mulerider Head Coach.

=== Softball ===
Southern Arkansas fielded a softball team as far back as 1930; however, college opponents were difficult to find. Softball has seen some success of the years. Teams coached by Kathryn Smith Brown coached a team to the finals of the Southwest Regional Tournament in 1949. In 1980, Margaret Browning lead the Lady Muleriders to their first full conference championship in school history. The 2003 Lady Muleriders shared the Gulf South Conference Western Division crown.

Since 1999, the Lady Muleriders have compiled a 378–455 (.454) record. On May 3, 2014, the Lady Muleriders won the GAC Softball Tournament Championship with 4–0 and 8–0 wins over Southeastern Oklahoma State University. The current head coach of the Lady Muleriders is Jason Anderson.

=== Rodeo ===
Southern Arkansas has a rich rodeo tradition. 2012 marked the 40th anniversary of SAU's rodeo program joining the National Intercollegiate Rodeo Association. The rodeo boasts an overall women's team National Championship in 1986; All-Around Cowgirl titles in 1984, 1987, 1989; and a men's calf roping champion in 2009.

=== Volleyball ===
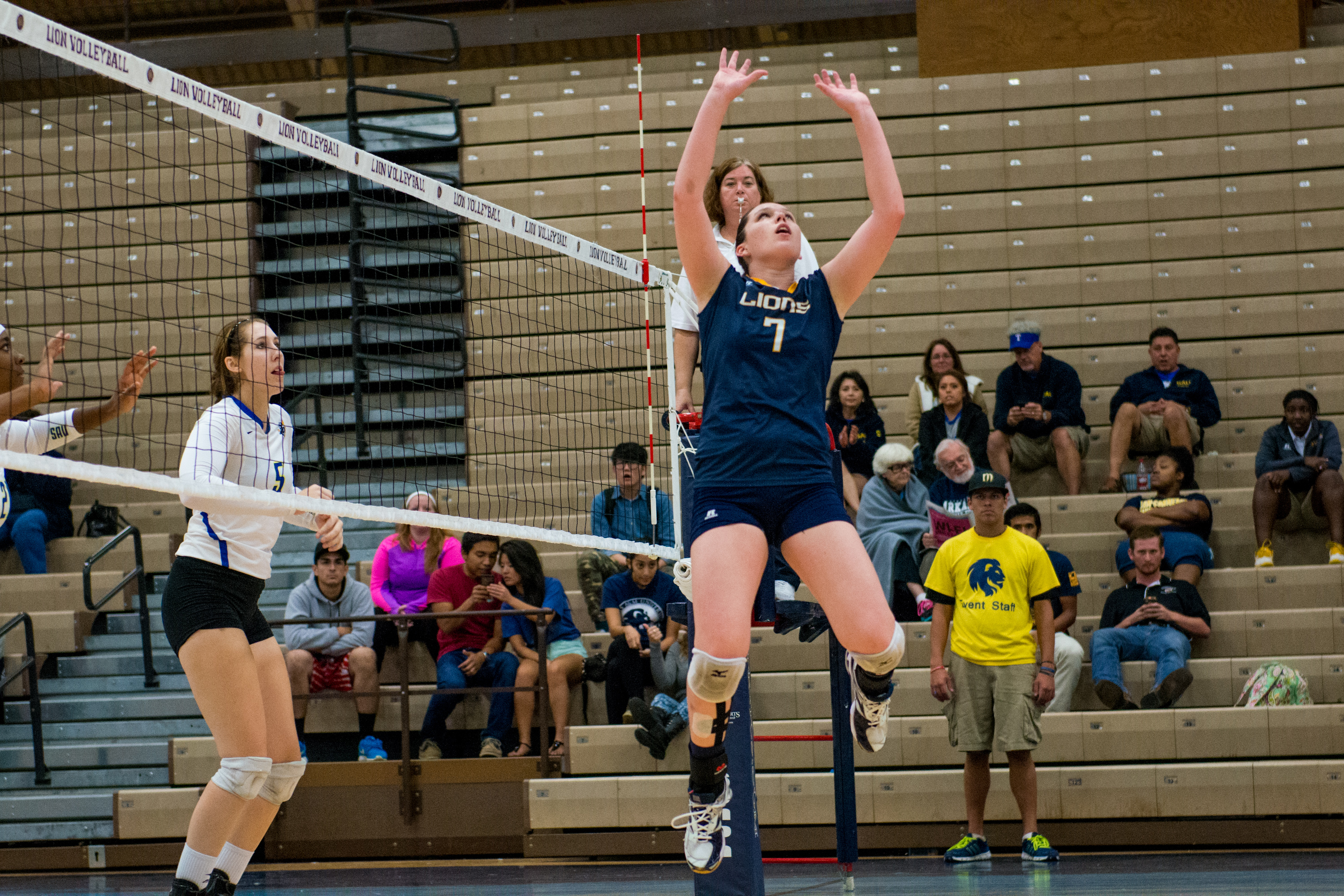
The Southern Arkansas volleyball team in action against the Texas A&M–Commerce Lions in 2014

Six conference championships were won by the Lady Mulerider Volleyball teams between their first season in 1971 and their final AIC title in 1995. However, success has been sporadic since moving to the NCAA Division II in 1996. Steven Gream was hired prior to the 2010 season to lead the volleyball program back to its winning ways.

Following an abysmal 1–32 season prior to his arrival, Gream's first squad won 20 games. Under his leadership, the Lady Mulerider program has a winning percentage of .583 (77–55 record), won the program's first post-season match, and the first semi-final conference tournament finish in program history.

== University head coaches ==
=== Current head coaches ===
As of April 2019

| Name | Sport | Alma mater | Year enter. | SAU record | Career record |
|---|---|---|---|---|---|
| Justin Pettigrew | Baseball | Arkansas Tech | 3rd | 101–46 | 101–46 |
| Andy Sharpe | Men's Basketball | Reinhardt (GA) University | 8th | 101–98 | 269–168 |
| Mike McCarty | Football | University of Central Arkansas | 11th | 43–42 | 100–76–1 |
| Jason Anderson | Softball | n/a | 5th | 217–70 | 524–143 |
| Lindsey Partridge | Volleyball | Missouri Western State University | 1st | 0–0 | 0–0 |
| Adam Collins | Women's Basketball | Charleston Southern University | 2nd | 3–25 | 163–155 |
| Tim Servis | Cross Country & Track & Field | University of the Ozarks | 5th | | |
| Ben Sanders | Golf | UAPB | 2nd | | |
| Greg Owen | Tennis | SOSU | 1st | 38–8 | 104–30 |
| Rusty Hayes | Rodeo | SAU | unknown | | |

== Traditions ==
=== School colors ===
SAU's school colors of Royal Blue and Gold were chosen in honor of the Farmer's Union. The union paved the way for the Third District Agricultural School to be founded in Magnolia in 1909.

=== Nickname and logo ===
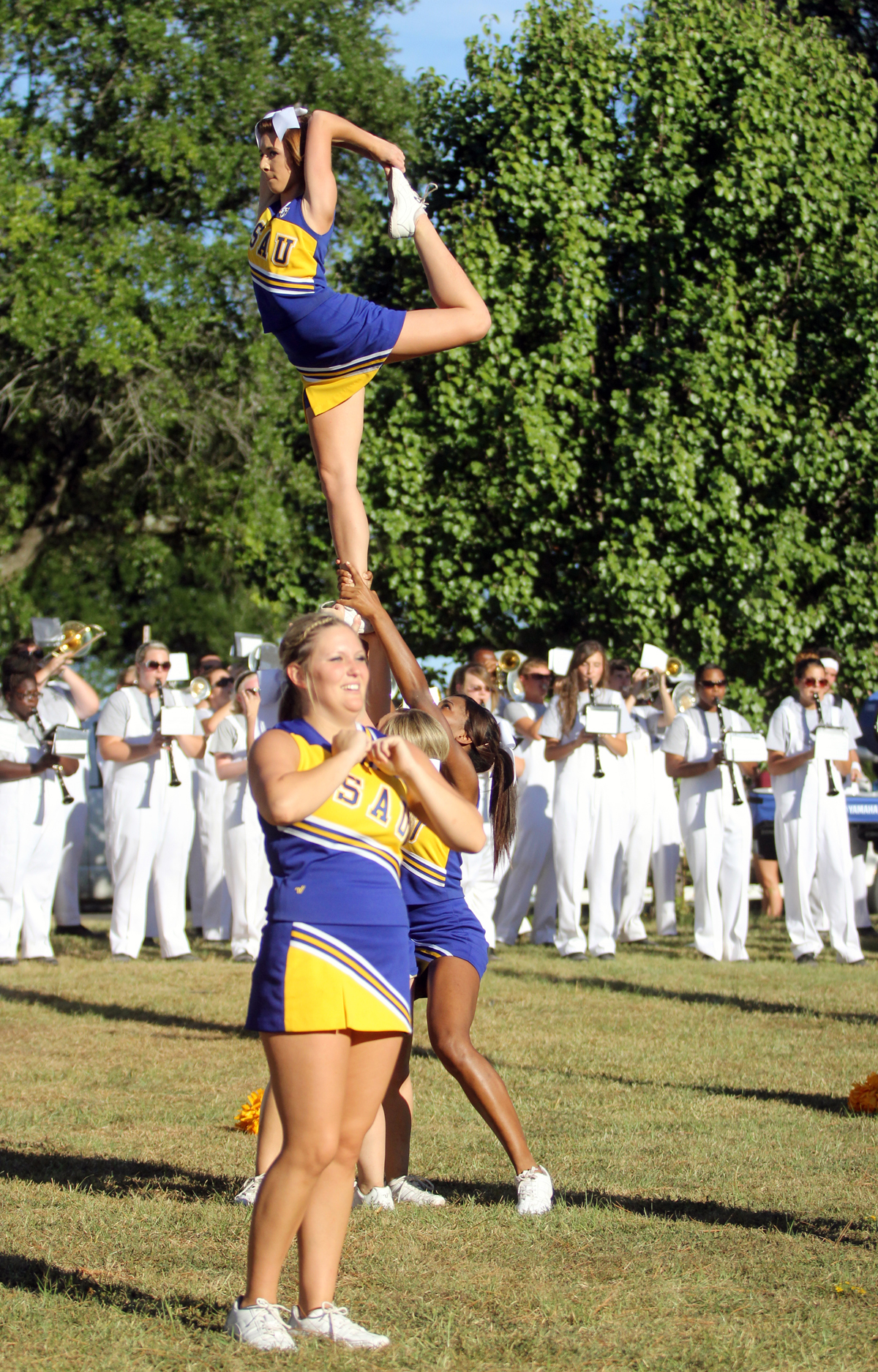
Cheerleaders and band performing on Family Day, September 2013

Southern Arkansas's athletic teams have gone by several nicknames during the years. Names include "Aggies", "Burros", "Mulettes", "Kats" and "Riderettes" before becoming the Muleriders/Lady Muleriders officially. The Mulerider nickname is regularly names one of the most unusual nicknames in college athletics. There are several versions of how the Muleriders became the nickname of SAU. The university has accepted the following legend of the nickname:

Shortly after Thanksgiving in 1912, young men from the football team of the Third District Agricultural School (TDAS) rode mules to Coach George RufordTurrentine’s home north of the campus at Magnolia, Arkansas. In that year’s final game, they had played a scoreless tie game with Fordyce High School at TDAS on "Turkey Day," November 28, and they wanted to talk over the season with the coach. It was not unusual for young men in the rural South to ride mules; as the animal used most often in Southern agriculture, they were easily available. In the school’s early years, football teams may have ridden mules occasionally to reach McNeil, five miles north of TDAS. It was there that they caught the Cotton Belt train to away games. There were only four automobiles in Columbia County in 1912 and no paved roads. Muddy roads in flooding weather conditions made travel difficult, even by wagon. Riding a mule was a more reliable means of transportation.
A few days after the Fordyce game, Coach Turrentine invited the players to dinner at his home, also located on the road to McNeil. As the riders dismounted in his yard, Turrentine walked onto his porch and shouted a greeting, "My Mule Riders!" This was the first known occasion when the name Mule Riders was used for the football team. Over time, it became more than the team’s name. Among all the nation’s institutions of higher education, the name has been uniquely associated with the school established in 1909. Over the next century, only TDAS and its three successor institutions—Magnolia A&M College, Southern State College, and Southern Arkansas University—embraced Mule Riders as a symbol for athletic teams, mascots, students, and alumni.

The western style bronco-breaking rider on a bucking mule first appeared atop The Bray student newspaper masthead in 1949–1950.

=== Mascot ===
Molly Ann is the official mascot of the SAU Muleriders. Molly Ann is a full-size American mule ridden by a "mule rider". Molly Ann can be found at football games, "Mulegates", and other campus events.

Molly Ann replaced longtime mascot Molly B following Molly B's death on March 5, 2013. Molly B was the official mascot for 20 years.

== Rivals ==
=== Battle of the Timberlands ===
The Battle of the Timberlands is an annual football game between Southern Arkansas and University of Arkansas–Monticello. The game became known as the "Battle of the Timberlands" in 2012 when a traveling trophy for the contest was created. The rivalry between the two schools dates back to 1913. Both schools are currently members of the Great American Conference. Through the 88 games played, SAU leads the series 52–35–1.

== Facilities ==
=== Wilkins Stadium ===
Wilkins Stadium is a football stadium located in Magnolia, Arkansas. Wilkins Stadium has been the home field for the Southern Arkansas University Mulerider football team since 1949. Named for former Magnolia A&M president Colonel Charles S. Wilkins, the Muleriders have compiled a 177–137–5 record at Wilkins Stadium.

The stadium features dual grandstands with seating for 6,000. The field is RealGrass Turf and features the western style bronco rider logo at midfield with "Southern Arkansas" in the north endzone and "Muleriders" in the south endzone. The scoreboard is in the south endzone.

=== Walker Stadium at Goodheart Field ===
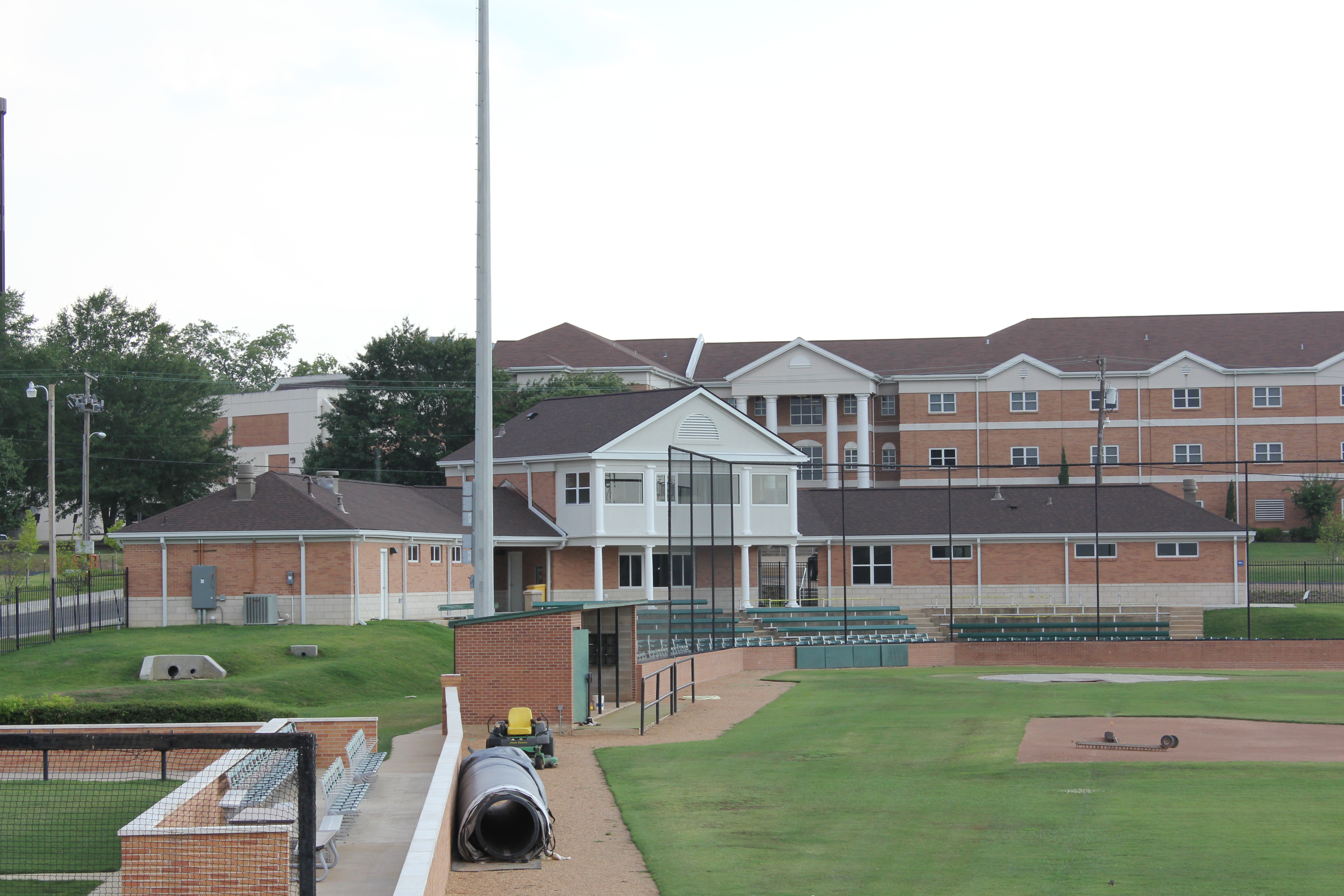
Goodheart Field view in 2011

Walker Stadium at Goodheart Field is a baseball stadium located in Magnolia, Arkansas. It is the home field for the Southern Arkansas Mulerider baseball team. Walker Stadium at Goodheart Field consists of grandstand seating built into a hill behind homeplate as well as grass seating down the lines. Due to the prolonged success of Mulerider Baseball, SAU opened a completely remodeled facility that included new coaches’ offices, locker rooms, concession stands, restrooms and press box during the 2011 baseball season. The capacity is approximately 1000.

Field dimensions are 350–410–340. The field is named for former coach Steve Goodheart. The stadium is named after the Willard and Pat Walker Charitable Foundation.

In 2010 Southern Arkansas moved in the Top Ten in NCAA Division II average home attendance with 4,890 fans attending the 14 games. The average attendance of 349 fans was good for 8th in the NCAA.

=== W.T. Watson Athletic Center ===
The W.T. Watson Athletic Center is the home of the Mulerider and Lady Mulerider basketball teams as well as the Lady Mulerider volleyball team. Named after the winningest coach in Mulerider basketball history, the W.T. Watson Athletic center features seating for 2,500 and provides teams with their own team room. Connected to the W.T. Watson Athletic Center is the Kathryn Brown Wellness and Education Center. This facility house the department of Kinesiology, home of SAU's athletic training program.

=== Ribble Strength Center ===
The Ribble Strength Center opened in 2012 and is the strength training facility for the Muleriders and Lady Muleriders. The center is the newest athletic facility on SAU's campus.

=== Dawson Field ===
Southern Arkansas recently completed a new softball field with covered batting cages for the Lady Mulerider softball team. Named in honor of Bill Dawson Sr. and Melissa Dawson, Dawson Field at the Mulerider Softball Complex is located on campus just north of the Walker Stadium at Goodheart Field.

=== Story Rodeo Arena ===
The Southern Arkansas University rodeo teams opened their brand new rodeo home arena, Story Arena, on March 14, 2014. The arena, named after Therral and Jan Story, features a dirt floor and seating for 1,400 spectators. A reception area featuring a ticket booth, concession stand, and restrooms acts at the front door to the arena.

== Championships ==
=== National championships ===
SAU has won one team and five individual national titles in its athletic history.

| Sport | Titles | Winning years |
|---|---|---|
| Rodeo Team Title | 1 | 1986 |
| NIRA National All Around Cowgirl | 3 | Nancy Rae (1984), Sherry Lynn Rosser (1987), Cathy Dennis (1989) |
| NIRA Calf Roping Champion | 1 | Cody Prescott (2009) |
| NAIA 400 Meter Relay Champion | 1 | 1994 |
Total National Championships: 6

=== Conference championships ===
Affiliations (men's)

- 1919–1926, Independent
- 1926–1995, Arkansas Intercollegiate Conference
- 1995–2011, Gulf South Conference
- 2011–present, Great American Conference

==== Men's championships ====
SAU has won conference championships in the following men's sports:

| Sport | Titles | Winning years |
|---|---|---|
| Baseball | 26 | 1953, 1954, 1956, 1968, 1974, 1975, 1977, 1983, 1986, 1987, 1988, 1989, 1990, 1991, 1992, 1994, 1995, 2006, 2009, 2011, 2012, 2013, 2014, 2015, 2017, 2018 |
| Basketball | 6 | 1934, 1935, 1966, 1967, 1971 1989; Southeastern Junior College Championship: 1948; NAIA District 17: 1957, 1966, 1967, 1971, 1983, 1989; In total, SAU men's basketball has won 13 championships. |
| Bowling | 1 | 1973 |
| Cross Country | 1 | 1970 |
| Football | 8 | 1926, 1927, 1929, 1948, 1951, 1952, 1972, 1997 |
| Golf | 5 | 1954,1965, 1972, 1973, 1974 |
| Track and Field | 7 | 1967, 1968, 1970, 1983, 1984, 1985, 2018 |
| Tennis | 16 | 1948, 1954, 1955, 1961, 1972, 1973, 1974, 1980, 1982, 1983, 1984, 1986, 1988, 1989, 1992, 2019 |
Total Conference Championships: 70

Affiliation (women's)

- Prior to 1969, AAU and/or Arkansas Women's Extramural Sports Association
- 1969–1983, Arkansas Women's Intercollegiate Association
- 1983–1995, Arkansas Intercollegiate Conference
- 1995–2011, Gulf South Conference
- 2011–present, Great American Conference

SAU has won conference championships in the following women's sports:

==== Women's championships ====
| Sport | Titles | Winning years |
|---|---|---|
| Basketball | 9 | 1949, 1966, 1970, 1971, 1972, 1974, 1975, 1976, 1977 |
| Bowling | 1 | 1967 |
| Swimming & Diving | 2 | 1967, 1969 |
| Softball | 6 | 1980, 2003, 2014, 2016, 2018, 2019 |
| Tennis | 3 | 1967, 1968, 2019 |
| Track and Field | 5 | 1991, 1992, 1993, 1994, 1995 |
| Volleyball | 6 | 1974, 1975, 1982, 1988, 1989, 1995 |
Total Conference Championships: 32

Conference affiliations (rodeo)

- 1972–present, National Intercollegiate Rodeo Association Ozark Region

==== Rodeo championships ====
| Sport | Titles | Winning years |
|---|---|---|
| Rodeo NIRA Ozark Region | 12 | 1981, 1982, 1983, 1984, 1985, 1986, 1987, 1988, 1989, 1990, 2009, 2014 |
Total Conference Championships: 12

=== All Sports Title ===
The Muleriders won the Arkansas Intercollegiate Conference All Sports Title in 1968, 1971, 1972, 1973, and 1974.
