= Southern Arkansas Muleriders baseball =

Southern Arkansas Muleriders
- Founded: 1950
- University: Southern Arkansas University
- Head coach: Justin Pettigrew (6th season)
- Conference: Great American
- Location: Magnolia, Arkansas
- Home stadium: Goodheart Field at Walker Stadium (capacity: 1,000)
- Nickname: Muleriders
- Colors: Royal blue and gold

College World Series appearances
- NAIA: 1983,1987,1991 NCAA: 2022

NCAA tournament appearances
- 2004, 2006, 2008, 2009, 2010, 2011, 2012, 2013, 2014, 2015, 2017, 2018, 2021, 2022, 2023

Conference tournament champions
- GSC: 2006, 2009, 2011; GAC: 2012, 2013, 2014, 2015, 2018, 2022, 2023

Conference regular season champions
- AIC: 1953, 1954, 1956, 1968, 1974, 1975, 1977, 1983, 1986, 1987, 1988, 1989, 1990, 1991, 1992, 1994, 1995; GSC: 2009, 2010; GAC: 2012, 2013, 2015, 2017, 2021, 2022, 2023

The Southern Arkansas Mulerider baseball team represents Southern Arkansas University in NCAA Division II college baseball. SAU has competed in the Great American Conference (GAC) since 2011. Prior to joining the GAC, SAU competed in the NAIA's Arkansas Intercollegiate Conference from 1950 until moving to the NCAA in 1996. Upon moving to the NCAA, SAU competed in the Western Division of the Gulf South Conference from 1996–2011. The Muleriders play their home games on campus at Walker Stadium at Goodheart Field. Justin Pettigrew is the current head coach.

== History ==
Southern Arkansas was founded in 1909 as the Third District Agricultural School and fielded its first baseball team as early as 1911. After sporadic success of the first 60 years of the programs, Coach Steve Goodheart was named head coach in 1981 and quickly took SAU to new heights. Not only did he lead SAU to nine Arkansas Intercollegiate Conference championships, he oversaw SAU's transition from NAIA to NCAA Division II ranks. SAU has won 23 conference regular seasons championships (17 – AIC, 2 – GSC, 4 – GAC), seven conference tournament championships (3 – GSC, 4 – GAC), made three NAIA world series appearances including a third-place finish in 1987, and 11 NCAA Division II Regional appearances.

=== Pre-NCAA years ===
For many years SAU fielded a two-year baseball program before joining the Arkansas Intercollegiate Conference. The now defunct Arkansas Intercollegiate Conference featured NAIA schools in Arkansas from the 1940s through 1995. Conference members included Arkansas Tech University, Harding University, Henderson State University, Hendrix College, Lyon College (Arkansas College), Ouachita Baptist University, Southern Arkansas University (Southern State College), University of Arkansas at Monticello (Arkansas A&M), University of Central Arkansas, and the University of the Ozarks (College of the Ozarks). At least three Southern Arkansas University Sports Hall of Fame members served as coach of the Mulerider baseball team in this era. Coach Sam Bailey coached the Muleriders to a 41–36 record from 1951–1956. Dr. Delwin T. Ross was the coach from 1957–1967.

=== The Seventies ===
Monroe Ingram coached baseball and basketball at SAU. Ingram's baseball teams produced a record of 107–86 and won AIC Championships in 1974, 1975, and 1977. Following Ingram as Head Coach of the Muleriders was Dr. Jack Harrington. Harrington was the coach of the ‘Riders from 1977–1980 and finished his career with a record of 56–53. All three of Dr. Harrington's teams finished in 2nd place in the AIC with 9–5 conference records. Following Dr. Harrington, Steve Goodheart, one of Coach Ingram's former players and assistant coaches was named Head Coach after the 1980 season and proceeded to take SAU's baseball program to new heights.

=== The Steve Goodheart era ===
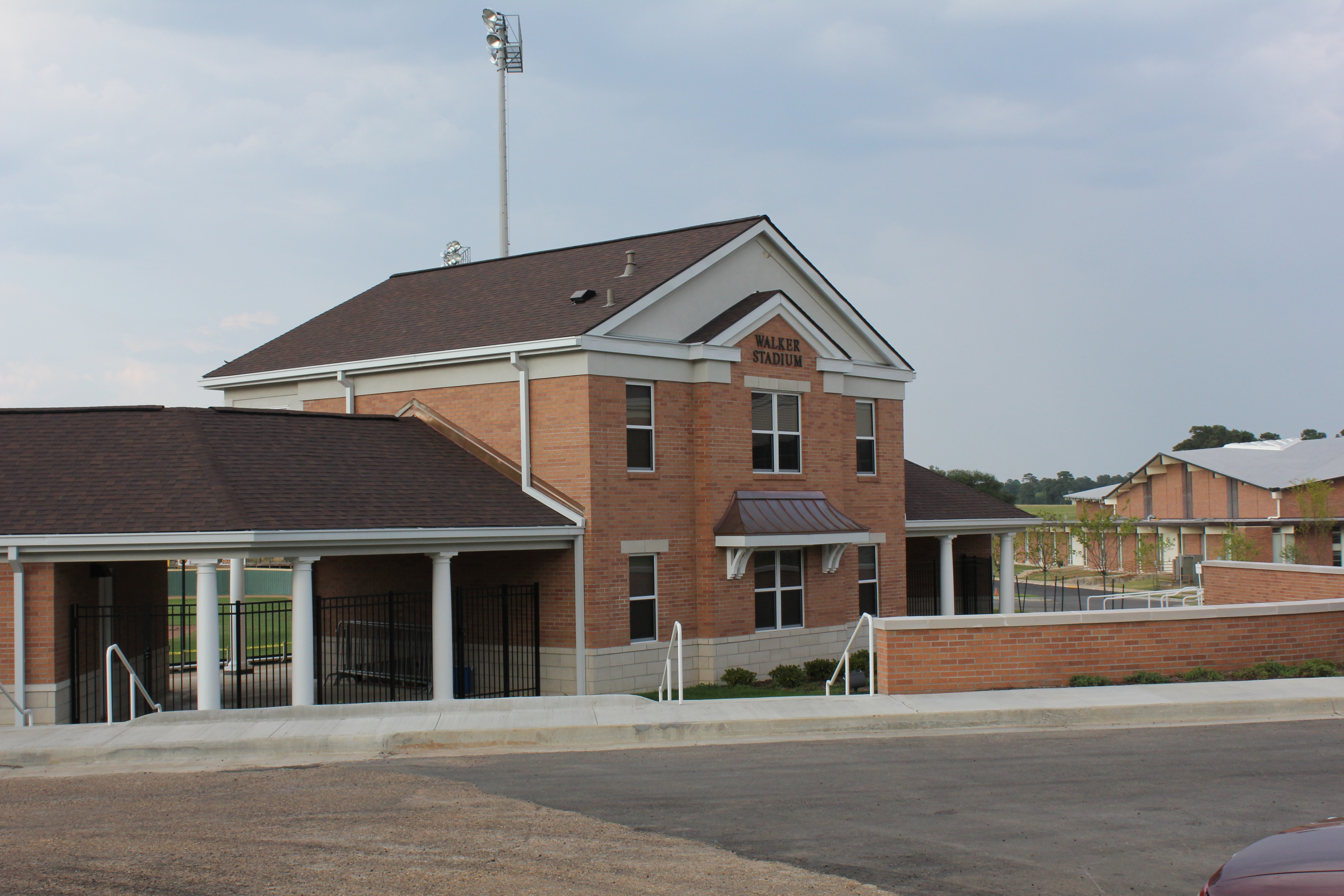
Walker Stadium

Athletic Director W.T. Watson hired Southern Arkansas graduate and University of Arizona Graduate Assistant Steve Goodheart as Head Coach in 1980. Goodheart was a four-year letter winner at SAU from 1973-1976 and was a student assistant at SAU in 1977. SAU won AIC Championships in 1974 and 1975 while Goodheart was a player, as well as 1977 when Goodheart was a student assistant. Following the 1977 season, Goodheart spent one year as the head coach of Camden, Arkansas' Camden Fairview High School. In 1979 Goodheart went to the University of Arizona where he served as a Graduate Assistant. The 1980 Arizona Wildcats baseball team won the College World Series.

Goodheart retired in 2003 as the winningest coach in school history. With a record of 764 wins, 406 losses, and 5 ties, good for a .647 winning percentage, Goodheart is the second-winningest baseball coach in Arkansas history behind former University of Arkansas coach Norm DeBriyn’s 1,161 wins.

Goodheart won 19 championships during his career at SAU. As head coach, his Muleriders were AIC champions in 1983, 1986, 1987, 1988, 1989, 1990, 1991, 1992, 1994, and 1995. Three of his SAU teams made appearances in the NAIA World Series (1983, 1987, 1991). The 1987 team finished third in the World Series with a record of 46–7. Goodheart's teams also won six district titles and 2 area titles. According to a press release when Goodheart was elected into the Southern Arkansas University Sports Hall of Fame:

“More than 50 of Goodheart’s former players have signed to play professional baseball. He has coached 54 first-team All-AIC players, 26 first-team NAIA District 17 players, five NAIA All-Area players, 12 NAIA Southwest Region selections, 17 NAIA All-Americans, one NAIA Academic All-American, two Cliff Shaw Scholar-Athlete Award winners, 33 All-Gulf South Conference choices, 10 NCAA All-South Central Region selections, and two NCAA All-Americans.”

Perhaps the most important accomplishment of Goodheart's career was overseeing SAU's transition from NAIA to the NCAA ranks. Not only were Goodheart's teams able to make the jump, the teams proceeded to win at an even higher level.

=== The Allen Gum era ===
Former Mulerider Allen Gum was named head coach prior to the 2006 season. The next five years saw SAU reach a new level of success that included five NCAA Division II Regional appearances, 24 weeks ranked number 1, a first-round draft pick, and SAU's only two Gulf South Conference titles. Gum left SAU to become the Head Coach at the University of Central Arkansas following the 2010 season. Gum finished his SAU career with a record of 226 wins and 68 losses. His career .769 winning percentage is second best in Gulf South Conference history and the best in SAU baseball history.

Despite consistently finishing near the top of the Western Division, 2006 was a banner year for the SAU baseball program. Finishing the season at 40–18 SAU won the Gulf South Conference tournament for the first time. The 2006 season began a stretch of five consecutive seasons with 40+ wins. In 2008, the Muleriders reached the number 1 ranking for the first time in school history and made it to the semi-finals of the South Central regional.

The 2009 season was one of the most successful seasons in school history. The only team to break the 50 win plateau, SAU finished the season 52–11, won their first GSC Western Division Title, won the Gulf South Conference Tournament for a second time, and hosted the NCAA South Regional for the first time in school history. The 2010 squad entered the season with similar expectations. The Muleriders proceeded to repeat as GSC Western Division winners before losing in the Gulf Southern Conference Tournament title game to Valdosta State. SAU made it to the NCAA South Regional finals before losing to Regional host University of Tampa. SAU finished 2010 with a record of 47–10 and saw four Muleriders drafted in the MLB draft, while two more signed free agent professional contracts.

=== The Steve Browning era ===
Steve Browning's relationship with SAU baseball began in 1998 when he played for former coach Steve Goodheart. Following several years as a student/graduate assistant and assistant coach, Athletic Director Jay Adcox named Browning the head coach of the Muleriders in June 2010.

Mulerider baseball has proven to be in good hands under Coach Browning. In 2011, SAU's last season in the Gulf South Conference, the Muleriders finished 36–16, winning the GSC tournament and making the NCAA South Regional. In their first year competing in the newly-formed Great American Conference, SAU continued their championship tradition. Finishing the season with a record of 37–17, SAU won both the regular season and tournament championship and made their fifth consecutive NCAA Regional appearance.

Due to the success of his baseball program, as well as his relationship with the university, Dr. David Rankin named Coach Browning as Athletic Director on July 1, 2012.

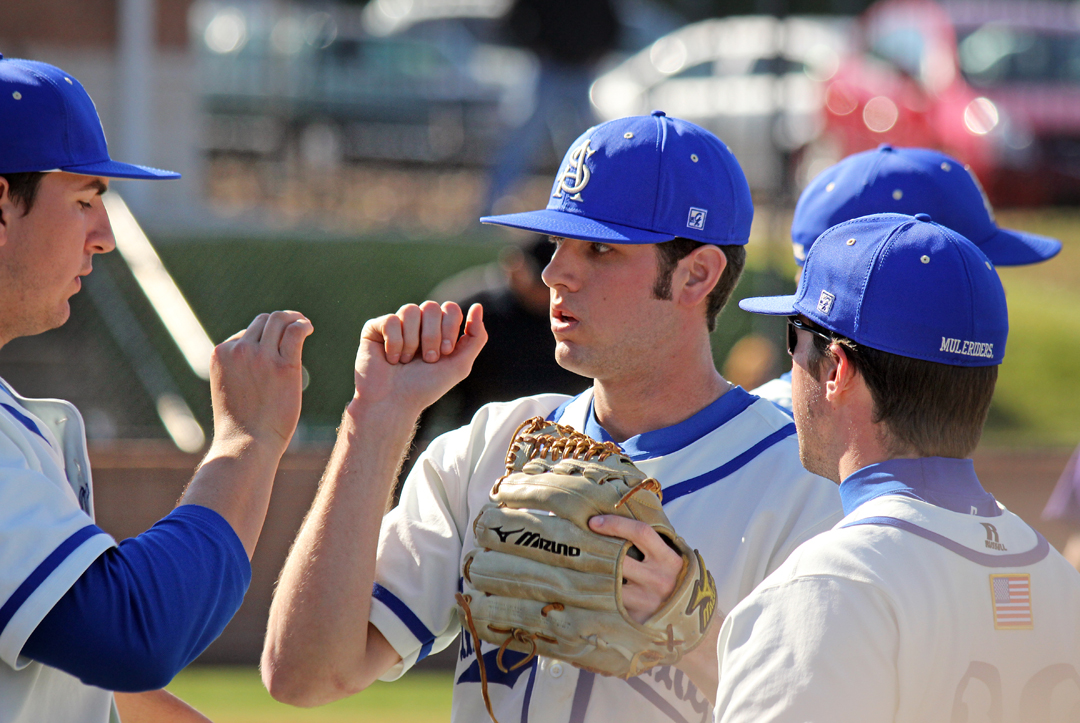
Muleriders baseball players in 2013

Browning won his 100th game as the Mulerider's Head Coach with a 12–3 victory over East Central University on April 6, 2013.

The Muleriders won their third consecutive (2nd in the GAC) conference tournament title and their fourth in five years with an 11–2 victory over UAM on May 7, 2013.

Following the 2016 season, Browning retired from coaching to become the full-time Athletics Director role at SAU. He finished his career as SAU's baseball coach with a 224–107 record.

=== The Justin Pettigrew era ===
Following 11 years as a top assistant at SAU, Justin Pettigrew was elevated to Head Coach on May 9, 2016.

== Walker Stadium at Goodheart Field ==
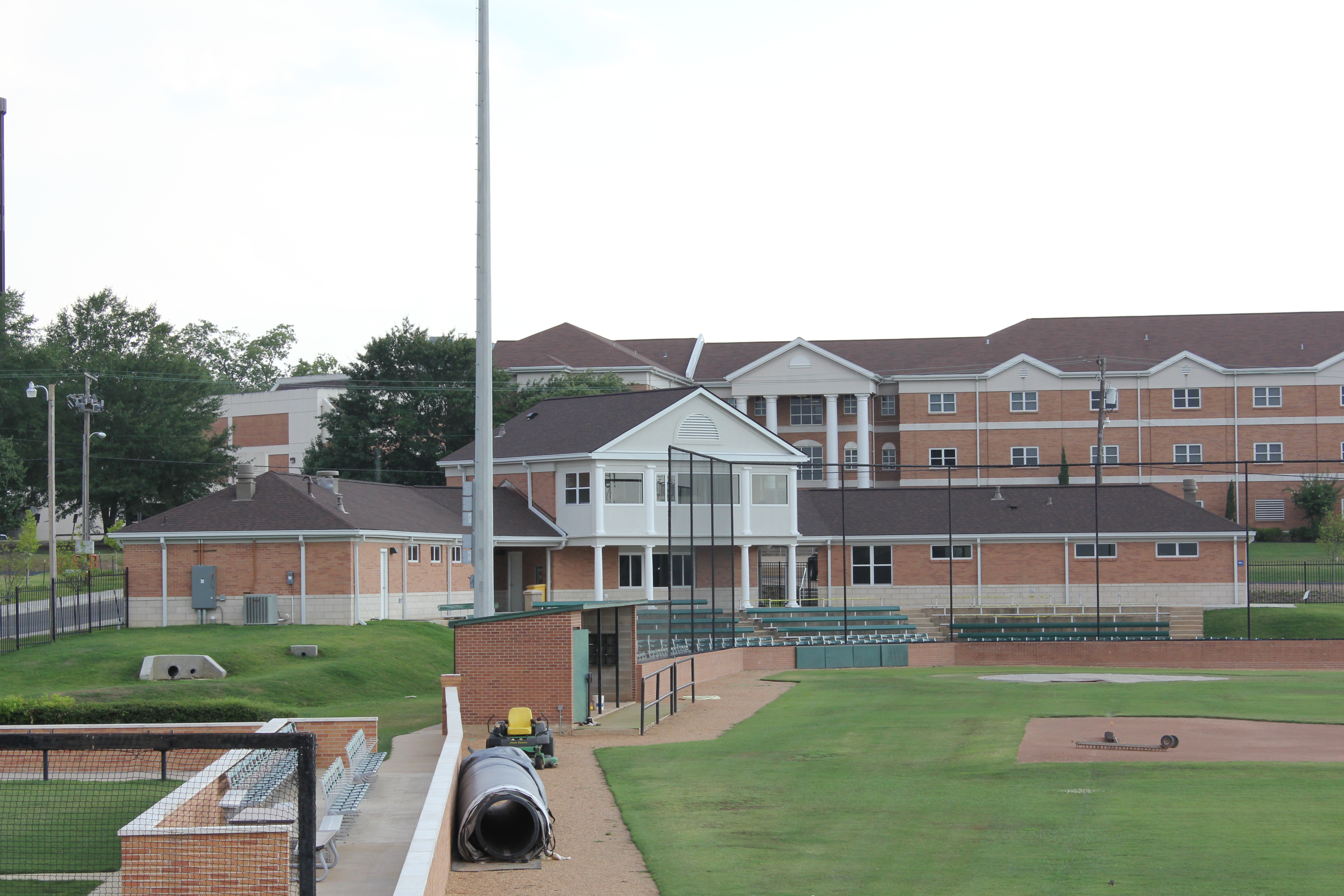
Right field view

Walker Stadium at Goodheart Field is a baseball stadium located in Magnolia, Arkansas. It is the home field for the Southern Arkansas Mulerider baseball team. Walker Stadium at Goodheart Field consists of grandstand seating built into a hill behind homeplate as well as grass seating down the lines. Due to the prolonged success of Mulerider Baseball, SAU opened a completely remodeled facility that included new coaches’ offices, locker rooms, concession stands, restrooms and press box during the 2011 baseball season. The capacity is approximately 1000. Field dimensions are 350–410–340. The field is named for former coach Steve Goodheart. The stadium is named after the Willard and Pat Walker Charitable Foundation.

In 2010 Southern Arkansas moved in the Top Ten in NCAA Division II average home attendance with 4,890 fans attending the 14 games. The average attendance of 349 fans was good for eighth in the NCAA.

== Head coaches ==
- Records are for coaches from 1950 through present

| Tenure | Coach | Years | Record | Pct. | Championships |
|---|---|---|---|---|---|
| 1950 | Ralph Ross | 1 | 2–7–0 | .222 | 0 |
| 1951–1956 | Sam Bailey | 5 | 41–36–0 | .532 | 3 |
| 1957–1967 | Dr. Delwin T. Ross | 11 | 60–129–1 | .320 | 0 |
| 1968–1970 | Bob Staten | 3 | 43–38–0 | .530 | 1 |
| 1971–1977 | Monroe Ingram | 7 | 107–86–0 | .554 | 3 |
| 1978–1980 | Dr. Jack Harrington | 3 | 56–53–0 | .513 | 0 |
| 1981–2003 | Steve Goodheart | 23 | 764–406–5 | .647 | 9 |
| 2004–2005 | Mike Godfrey | 2 | 79–40–0 | .664 | 0 |
| 2006-2010 | Allen Gum | 5 | 226–68–0 | .769 | 3 |
| 2011–2016 | Steve Browning | 6 | 224–107–0 | .678 | 5 |
| 2017–present | Justin Pettigrew | 6 | 204-84 | .703 | 4 |
| Totals | 17 coaches | 72 | 1,806–1,054–6 | .630 | 28 |

== Year-by-year results ==
*November 16, 2020.
*Final Rankings are from Collegiate Baseball Division II Final Polls (1988–2013)

Year-by-Year Results

| Year | Coach | Record | Notes |
|---|---|---|---|
| 1950 | Ralph Ross | 2–7 |
| 1951 | Sam Bailey | 4–10 |
| 1952 | Sam Bailey | 4–10 |
| 1953 | Sam Bailey | 6-4 | AIC Champions |
| 1954 | Sam Bailey | 9–1 | AIC Champions |
| 1955 | Sam Bailey | 7–5 |
| 1956 | Sam Bailey | 11–6 | AIC Champions |
| 1957 | Delwin Ross | 5–2 |
| 1958 | Delwin Ross | 0–5 |
| 1959 | Delwin Ross | 0–16 |
| 1960 | Delwin Ross | 4–7 |
| 1961 | Delwin Ross | 8–11 |
| 1962 | Delwin Ross | 5–13–1 |
| 1963 | Delwin Ross | 1–12 |
| 1964 | Delwin Ross | 8–15 |
| 1965 | Delwin Ross | 7–17 |
| 1966 | Delwin Ross | 11–16 |
| 1967 | Delwin Ross | 11–15 |
| 1968 | Bob Staten | 16–10 | AIC Champions |
| 1969 | Bob Staten | 15–11 |
| 1970 | Bob Staten | 12–17 |
| 1971 | Monroe Ingram | 7–13 |
| 1972 | Monroe Ingram | 15-17 |
| 1973 | Monroe Ingram | 19–9 |
| 1974 | Monroe Ingram | 16–14 | AIC Champions |
| 1975 | Monroe Ingram | 19–8 | AIC Champions |
| 1976 | Monroe Ingram | 12–14 |
| 1977 | Monroe Ingram | 19–11 | AIC Champions |
| 1978 | Jack Harrington | 19–15 |
| 1979 | Jack Harrington | 21–16 |
| 1980 | Jack Harrington | 16–22 |
| 1981 | Steve Goodheart | 11–30 |
| 1982 | Steve Goodheart | 11-27 |
| 1983 | Steve Goodheart | 37–13 | NAIA World Series, AIC Champions |
| 1984 | Steve Goodheart | 5–37 |
| 1985 | Steve Goodheart | 25-20 |
| 1986 | Steve Goodheart | 36–12 | AIC Champions |
| 1987 | Steve Goodheart | 46–7 | NAIA World Series, AIC Champions |
| 1988 | Steve Goodheart | 43–13 | AIC Champions |
| 1989 | Steve Goodheart | 33–23–1 | AIC Champions |
| 1990 | Steve Goodheart | 27–23 | AIC Champions |
| 1991 | Steve Goodheart | 44–15–1 | NAIA World Series, AIC Champions |
| 1992 | Steve Goodheart | 35–26 | AIC Champions |
| 1993 | Steve Goodheart | 43–14 |
| 1994 | Steve Goodheart | 41–16–1 | AIC Champions |
| 1995 | Steve Goodheart | 40–14 | AIC Champions, Final NAIA Season |
| 1996 | Steve Goodheart | 42–15 | First NCAA Season |
| 1997 | Steve Goodheart | 33–16 |
| 1998 | Steve Goodheart | 32–16 |
| 1999 | Steve Goodheart | 36–17 |
| 2000 | Steve Goodheart | 25–16–2 |
| 2001 | Steve Goodheart | 39–15 | Final Ranking: 17 |
| 2002 | Steve Goodheart | 42–14 | Final Ranking: 17 |
| 2003 | Steve Goodheart | 38–17 | Final Ranking: 21 |
| 2004 | Mike Godfrey | 45–15 | Final Ranking: 10, NCAA Regional |
| 2005 | Mike Godfrey | 34–25 |
| 2006 | Allen Gum | 40–18 | Final Ranking: 18, GSC Tournament Champions, NCAA Regional |
| 2007 | Allen Gum | 41–17 |
| 2008 | Allen Gum | 46–12 | Final Ranking: 12, GSC Tournament Champions, NCAA Regional |
| 2009 | Allen Gum | 52–11 | Final Ranking: 4, GSC Regular Season & Tournament Champions, NCAA Regional (host school) |
| 2010 | Allen Gum | 47–10 | Final Ranking: 6, GSC Champions, NCAA Regional |
| 2011 | Steve Browning | 36–16 | Final Ranking: 30, GSC Tournament Champions, NCAA Regional |
| 2012 | Steve Browning | 37–17 | Final Ranking: 26, GAC Regular Season & Tournament Champions, NCAA Regional |
| 2013 | Steve Browning | 42–17 | Final Ranking: 15, GAC Regular Season & Tournament Champions, NCAA Regional |
| 2014 | Steve Browning | 39–19 | Final Ranking: 8, GAC Tournament Champions, NCAA Regional |
| 2015 | Steve Browning | 40–18 | Final Ranking: 28, GAC Regular Season & Tournament Champions, NCAA Regional |
| 2016 | Steve Browning | 30–20 |
| 2017 | Justin Pettigrew | 39-16 | Final Ranking: 16, GAC Regular Season Champions, NCAA Regional |
| 2018 | Justin Pettigrew | 41-19 | Final Ranking: 19, GAC Tournament Champions, NCAA Regional |
| 2019 | Justin Pettigrew | 29-20 |
| 2020* | Justin Pettigrew | 19-4 | Final Ranking: 18 |
| 2021 | Justin Pettigrew | 30-16 | GAC Regular Season Champions, NCAA Regional |
| 2022 | Justin Pettigrew | 46-11 | Final Ranking: GAC Regular Season & Tournament Champions, NCAA Central Region Champions, College World Series |

== Championships ==
=== Conference Championships ===
Conference affiliations:

- 1950–1995, Arkansas Intercollegiate Conference
- 1995–2011, Gulf South Conference
- 2011–present, Great American Conference

| Year | Conference | Coach | Overall Record |
|---|---|---|---|
| 1953† | AIC | Sam Bailey | 6–4 |
| 1954† | AIC | Sam Bailey | 9–1 |
| 1956 | AIC | Sam Bailey | 11–6 |
| 1968 | AIC | Bob Staten | 16–10 |
| 1974† | AIC | Monroe Ingram | 16–14 |
| 1975 | AIC | Monroe Ingram | 19–8 |
| 1977 | AIC | Monroe Ingram | 19–11 |
| 1983 | AIC | Steve Goodheart | 37–13 |
| 1986 | AIC | Steve Goodheart | 36–12 |
| 1987 | AIC | Steve Goodheart | 47–6 |
| 1988 | AIC | Steve Goodheart | 43–13 |
| 1989 | AIC | Steve Goodheart | 33–23–1 |
| 1990 | AIC | Steve Goodheart | 27–23 |
| 1991 | AIC | Steve Goodheart | 44–15–1 |
| 1992 | AIC | Steve Goodheart | 35–26 |
| 1994 | AIC | Steve Goodheart | 41–16–1 |
| 1995 | AIC | Steve Goodheart | 40–14 |
| 2009 | GSC | Allen Gum | 52–11 |
| 2010 | GSC | Allen Gum | 47–10 |
| 2012 | GAC | Steve Browning | 37–17 |
| 2013 | GAC | Steve Browning | 42–17 |
| 2015 | GAC | Steve Browning | 40–18 |
| 2017 | GAC | Justin Pettigrew | 39–14 |
| 2021† | GAC | Justin Pettigrew | 30–16 |
| 2022 | GAC | Justin Pettigrew | 46–11 |
| Total Conference Championships: | | | 25 (17 AIC, 2 GSC, 6 GAC) |
† Denotes co-champions

=== Conference Tournament Championships ===
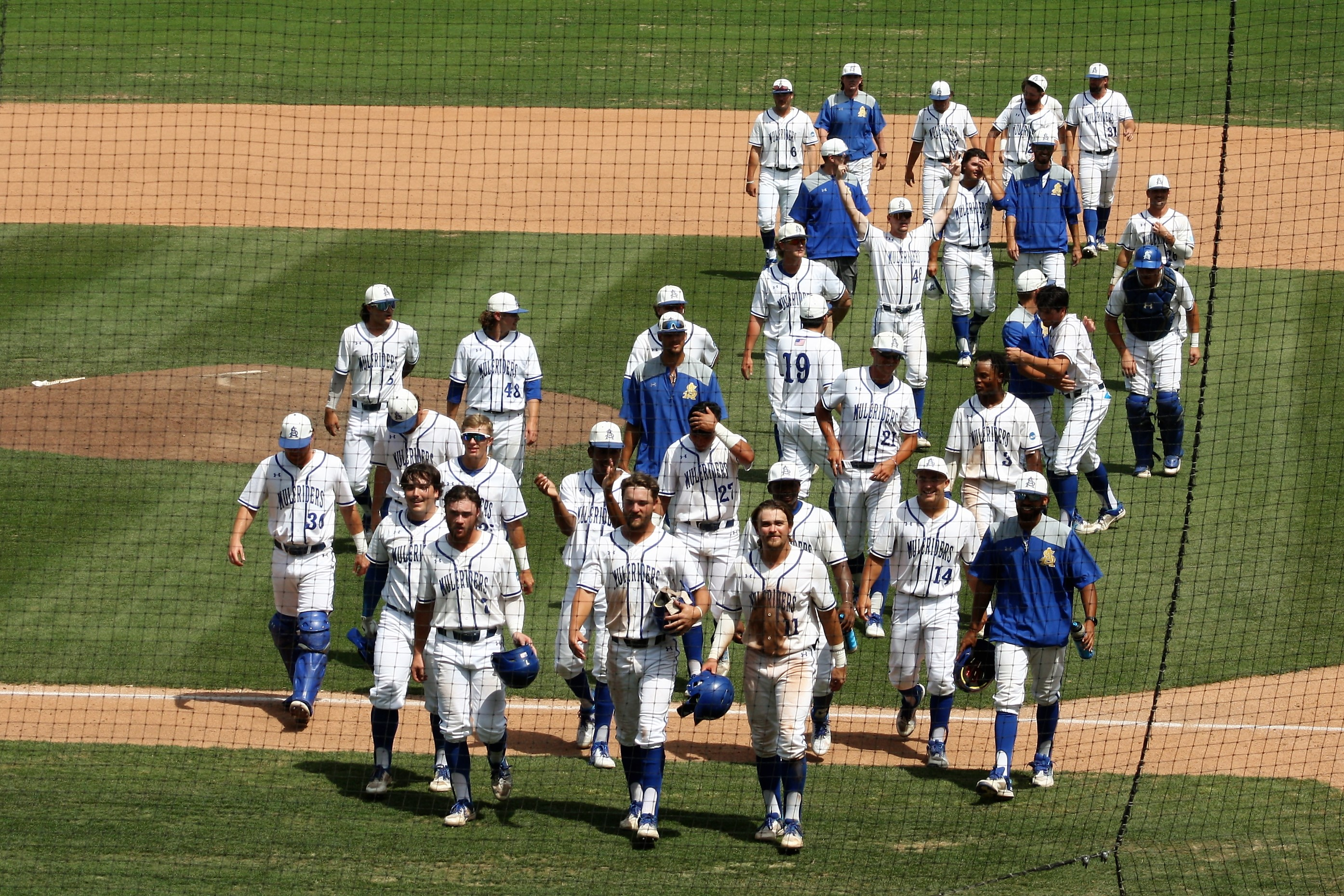
SAU leaves the field after winning the 2023 GAC Tournament

Conference affiliations:

- 1995–2011, Gulf South Conference
- 2011–present, Great American Conference

| Year | Conference | Coach | Overall Record |
|---|---|---|---|
| 2006 | GSC | Allen Gum | 40–18 |
| 2009 | GSC | Allen Gum | 52–11 |
| 2011 | GSC | Steve Browning | 36–16 |
| 2012 | GAC | Steve Browning | 37–17 |
| 2013 | GAC | Steve Browning | 42–17 |
| 2014 | GAC | Steve Browning | 38–17 |
| 2015 | GAC | Steve Browning | 40–18 |
| 2018 | GAC | Justin Pettigrew | 41–19 |
| 2022 | GAC | Justin Pettigrew | 46-11 |
| Total Conference Tournament Championships: | | | 9 (3 GSC, 6 GAC) |

=== NAIA Championships ===
==== NAIA World Series Appearances ====
| Year | Coach | Overall Record |
|---|---|---|
| 1983 | Steve Goodheart | 37–13 |
| 1987 | Steve Goodheart | 46–7 |
| 1991 | Steve Goodheart | 44–15–1 |
| Total World Series Appearances: | | 3 |

==== NAIA Area Championships ====
| Year | Area | Coach | Overall Record |
|---|---|---|---|
| 1983 | Area 5 | Steve Goodheart | 37–13 |
| 1991 | Area 5 | Steve Goodheart | 44–15–1 |
| Total Area Championships: | | | 2 |

==== NAIA District Championships ====
| Year | District | Coach | Overall Record |
|---|---|---|---|
| 1983 | District 17 | Steve Goodheart | 37–13 |
| 1987 | District 17 | Steve Goodheart | 46–7 |
| 1988 | District 17 | Steve Goodheart | 43–13 |
| 1989 | District 17 | Steve Goodheart | 33–32–1 |
| 1991 | District 17 | Steve Goodheart | 44–15–1 |
| 1992 | District 17 | Steve Goodheart | 35–26 |
| 1994 | District 17 | Steve Goodheart | 41–16–1 |
| 1995 | District 17 | Steve Goodheart | 40–14 |
| Total District Championships: | | | 8 |

== NCAA tournament ==
=== SAU in the NCAA tournament ===
- SAU began participating in NCAA Division II Baseball in 1996.
- The format of the tournament has changed through the years.

| Year | Record | Pct | Notes |
|---|---|---|---|
| 2004 | 2–2 | .500 | Eliminated by Delta State Statesmen in the South-Central Regional Finals |
| 2006 | 2–2 | .500 | Eliminated by Montevallo Falcons in the South-Central Regional Semi-Finals |
| 2008 | 2–2 | .500 | Eliminated by Delta State Statesmen in the South-Central Regional Semi-Finals |
| 2009 | 3–2 | .600 | Eliminated by Florida Southern Moccasins in the South Regional Semi-Finals |
| 2010 | 4–2 | .667 | Eliminated by Tampa Spartans in the South Regional Finals |
| 2011 | 0–2 | .000 | Eliminated by Tampa Spartans in the South Regional Second Round |
| 2012 | 1–2 | .333 | Eliminated by Central Missouri Mules in the South Regional Quarter-Finals |
| 2013 | 2–2 | .500 | Eliminated by St. Cloud State Huskies in the Central Regional Semi-Finals |
| 2014 | 1–2 | .333 | Eliminated by Arkansas Tech Wonder Boys in the Central Regional Quarter-Finals. |
| 2015 | 1–2 | .333 | Eliminated by St. Cloud State Huskies in the Central Regional Quarter-Finals. |
| 2017 | 0–2 | .000 | Eliminated by University of Arkansas at Monticello in the Central Regional Second Round. |
| 2018 | 5–2 | .714 | Eliminated by Augustana University Vikings in the Central Regional Finals. |
| 2021 | 3–2 | .600 | Eliminated by Central Missouri Mules in the Central Regional Finals. |
| 2022 | 5–0 | 1.000 | |
| Total | 31–26 | .544 | |

=== NCAA World Series Appearances ===
| Year | Coach | Overall Record |
|---|---|---|
| 2022 | Justin Pettigrew | 46–11 |
| Total World Series Appearances: | | 1 |
