= Allen Gum =

American baseball coach and player (born 1969)

Current position
- Team: Shiloh Christian School
- Conference: 4A West

Biographical details
- Born: July 22, 1969 (age 57)

Playing career
- 1988–1989: Crowder
- 1990–1991: Southern Arkansas

Coaching career (HC unless noted)
- 1995–2000: Sheridan (AR) (Asst.)
- 2001–2003: Batesville (AR)
- 2004–2005: Southern Arkansas (Asst.)
- 2006–2010: Southern Arkansas
- 2011–2021: Central Arkansas

Head coaching record
- Overall: 536–336
- Tournaments: Gulf South: 17–7; Southland: 16–14; NCAA DII: 11–8; NCAA DI: 3–2

Accomplishments and honors

Championships
- 2009 Gulf South Regular season & Conference Tournament; 2010 Gulf South Conference Regular season 2013 Southland Conference Tournament

Awards
- 2006 Gulf South Coach of the Year; 2009 Gulf South Coach of the Year; 2009 NCBWA South Region Coach of the Year; SAU Sports Hall of Fame

Allen Gum (born July 22, 1969) is an American baseball coach and player. He played college baseball at Crowder College from 1988 to 1989 before transferring to Southern Arkansas. He then served as the head coach of the Southern Arkansas Muleriders (2006–2010) and the Central Arkansas Bears (2011–2021). Gum currently coaches at Shiloh Christian School in Springdale, Arkansas.

== Pre-collegiate coaching ==
Gum played two seasons at Crowder College before completing his eligibility at Southern Arkansas. Both seasons with the Muleriders, he batted above .300 and helped lead the team to conference championships. In his junior season, Southern Arkansas reached the NAIA World Series, where Gum was awarded the Charles Berry Hustle Award. He then served as an assistant coach at Sheridan High School in Sheridan, Arkansas for six years before becoming head coach at Batesville High School in Batesville, Arkansas in 2000. He remained at Batesville through the 2003 season, compiling a record of 75–25, and finishing as state runners up in both 2002 and 2003.

== Collegiate coaching career ==
In 2004, Gum became an assistant at Southern Arkansas. He was elevated to the top job in 2006. In five seasons, the Muleriders won 40 or more games every year, reached the Division II College World Seriesin 2009, won two conference championships, four Regionals, and the number one national ranking for 24 weeks during the course of three seasons. In the 2010 MLB draft, Muleriders pitcher Hayden Simpson was picked 16th overall by the Chicago Cubs, the highest Division II players to be drafted that year. In July 2010, Gum became head coach at Central Arkansas. He led the Bears to their first Southland Conference baseball tournament title in 2013, and reached the Regional final before falling to eventual national runner-up Mississippi State. Gum announced that the 2021 season would be his last at Central Arkansas, retiring from coaching.

Gum accepted the head coaching job at Shiloh Christian School in Springdale, Arkansas in February 2024.

== Head coaching record ==
Record table
Season	Team	Overall	Conference	Standing	Postseason
Southern Arkansas Muleriders (Gulf South Conference) (2006–2010)
2006	Southern Arkansas	40–18	16-7	2nd (West)	NCAA South Central Regional
2007	Southern Arkansas	41–17	16-5	3rd (West)	
2008	Southern Arkansas	46–12	17-3	2nd (West)	NCAA South Central Regional
2009	Southern Arkansas	52–11	18-3	1st (West)	NCAA South Regional
2010	Southern Arkansas	47–10	18-2	1st (West)	NCAA South Regional
Southern Arkansas:		226–68	85-20		
Central Arkansas Bears (Southland Conference) (2011–2021)
2011	Central Arkansas	24–29	13–20	11th (12)	
2012	Central Arkansas	25–30	16–17	T-6th (12)	Southland tournament (Note: The top eight finishers of the Southland's 12 teams qualified for the Tournament in 2012.)
2013	Central Arkansas	42–22	12–15	7th (10)	NCAA Regional
2014	Central Arkansas	32–22	17–13	6th	Southland tournament
2015	Central Arkansas	29–24	16–14	6th	Southland tournament
2016	Central Arkansas	29–27	16–14	5th	Southland tournament
2017	Central Arkansas	34–26	17–13	5th	Southland tournament
2018	Central Arkansas	32–25	17–13	5th	Southland tournament
2019	Central Arkansas	32–27	19–11	T-2nd	Southland tournament
2020	Central Arkansas	8–8	2–1		Season canceled due to COVID-19
2021	Central Arkansas	23–28	18–22	9th	
Central Arkansas:		310–268	163–153		
Total:		536–336			
National champion Postseason invitational champion Conference regular season champion Conference regular season and conference tournament champion Division regular season champion Division regular season and conference tournament champion Conference tournament champion
