= Arkansas Intercollegiate Conference =

20th century American athletic conference

- Formerly: Arkansas Intercollegiate Athletic Conference
- Conference: NAIA
- Founded: 1927 or 1928
- Folded: 1995
- No. of teams: 14
- Headquarters: North Little Rock, Arkansas

The Arkansas Intercollegiate Conference (AIC) was an athletic conference in existence from 1927 or 1928 to 1995 affiliated with the National Association of Intercollegiate Athletics (NAIA). The conference membership consisted entirely of colleges and universities in the state of Arkansas.

== History ==
Some references indicate that the league started competition in 1927 while others list a 1928 date. The league seems to have competed in baseball and basketball in 1927-28 and started football competition in 1929. Some references list football championships for 1927 and 1928 while others do not so these may have been unofficial titles that anticipated the start of the league's football competition.

In 1941, with many member institutions suffering from reduced male student populations, the AIC suspended competition in order to save gasoline and other resources necessary for the war effort. Competition was not resumed until the 1945 season.

In December 1952 the AIC schools implemented new "amateurism" rules that no scholarships or subsidies would be offered to athletes beyond those that were available to regular students. Southern Arkansas and Arkansas Tech were opposed to the new rules and did not strictly enforce them. In December 1955 several AIC schools declared that they would no longer play SAU or Tech due to unspecified violations of the rule and neither school was able to compete for titles in any sport during the 1956 and 1957 school years. This situation was finally resolved in 1959 when a compromise was reached and Southern Arkansas and Tech were "restored" to the conference.

In 1983, the conference sanctioned women's sports for the first time. Prior to this most women's teams competed in the Arkansas Women's Extramural Sports Association (AWESA) which was founded in 1965 and later renamed as the Arkansas Women's Intercollegiate Sports Association (AWISA) in 1973.

In 1993, Central Arkansas and Henderson State elected to move to the NCAA Division II Gulf South Conference and were followed by the remaining public schools in 1995 which marked the end of the conference. Two of the remaining private schools, Ouachita Baptist and Harding, were accepted into the Lone Star Conference. The other private school, John Brown University, joined the Sooner Athletic Conference as the AIC dissolved.

The New South Intercollegiate Swim Conference was formed after the dissolution to provide several of the old AIC school's swimming programs a chance to compete for championships.

== Member schools ==
=== Final members ===
Institution	Location (Note: All locations were within the State of Arkansas.)	Founded	Affiliation	Enrollment	Nickname	Joined	Left	Subsequent conference(s)	Current conference
Arkansas Tech University	Russellville	1909	Public	12,009	Wonder Boys & Golden Suns	1928–29	1994–95	Gulf South (GSC) (NCAA D-II) (1995–96 to 2010–11)	Great American (GAC) (NCAA D-II) (2011–12 to present)
University of Arkansas at Monticello	Monticello	1909	Public	3,659	Boll Weevils & Cotton Blossoms	1928–29	1994–95	Gulf South (GSC) (NCAA D-II) (1995–96 to 2010–11)	Great American (GAC) (NCAA D-II) (2011–12 to present)
Harding University	Searcy	1924	Churches of Christ	6,009	Bisons	1960–61	1994–95	Lone Star (LSC) (NCAA D-II) (1996–97 to 1999–2000); Gulf South (GSC) (NCAA D-II) (2000–01 to 2010–11)	Great American (GAC) (NCAA D-II) (2011–12 to present)
John Brown University	Siloam Springs	1919	Interdenominational	2,708	Golden Eagles	1993–94	1994–95	Sooner (SAC) (1995–96 to present)	
Lyon College	Batesville	1872	Presbyterian (PCUSA)	700	Scots	(Note: Lyon (Arkansas College) joined the AIC before 1980–81.)	1994–95	NAIA Independent (1995–96 to 1996–97); TranSouth (TSAC) (1997–98 to 2011–12); American Midwest (AMC) (2012–13 to 2022–23)	St. Louis (SLIAC) (NCAA D-III) (2023–24 to present)
Ouachita Baptist University	Arkadelphia	1886	Baptist	1,569	Tigers	1931–32	1994–95	Lone Star (LSC) (NCAA D-II) (1996–97 to 1999–2000); Gulf South (GSC) (NCAA D-II) (2000–01 to 2010–11)	Great American (GAC) (NCAA D-II) (2011–12 to present)
University of the Ozarks	Clarksville	1834	Presbyterian (PCUSA)	630	Eagles	1947–48	1994–95	D-III Independent (1995–96)	American Southwest (NCAA D-III) (1996–97 to present)
Southern Arkansas University	Magnolia	1909	Public	4,138	Muleriders	1929–30	1994–95	Gulf South (GSC) (NCAA D-II) (1995–96 to 2010–11)	Great American (GAC) (NCAA D-II) (2011–12 to present)
Williams Baptist College (Note: Currently known as Williams Baptist University since 2018.)	Walnut Ridge	1941	Baptist	700	Eagles	(Note: Williams Baptist joined the AIC about 1990–91.)	1994–95	TranSouth (TSAC) (1995–96 to 2000–01)	American Midwest (2001–02 to present)

=== Former members ===
Institution	Location (Note: All locations were within the State of Arkansas.)	Founded	Affiliation	Enrollment	Nickname	Joined	Left	Subsequent conference(s)	Current conference
Arkansas State University	Jonesboro	1909	Public	13,891	Red Wolves	1930–31	1949–50	NAIA Independent (1950–51 to 1956–57); College Div. Independent (1957–58 to 1962–63); Southland (SLC) (NCAA D-I) (1963–64 to 1986–87); American South (NCAA D-I) (1987–88 to 1990–91)	Sun Belt (NCAA D-I) (1991–92 to present)
University of Arkansas at Little Rock	Little Rock	1927	Public	9,759	Trojans	1961–62	1976–77	D-I Independent (1977–78 to 1978–79); Trans America (TAAC) (NCAA D-I) (Note: Later known as the Atlantic Sun Conference in 2001, currently known as the ASUN Conference since 2016.) (1979–80 to 1990–91); Sun Belt (SBC) (NCAA D-I) (1991–92 to 2021–22)	Ohio Valley (OVC) (NCAA D-I) (2022–23 to present)
University of Arkansas at Pine Bluff	Pine Bluff	1873	Public	2,498	Golden Lions	1970–71 (Note: Arkansas–Pine Bluff appears to have been a member of the AIC from 1970–71 to 1971–72; and then again from 1985–86 to 1986–87.)	1986–87	NAIA Independent (1987–88 to 1997–98)	Southwestern (SWAC) (NCAA D-I) (1998–99 to present)
University of Central Arkansas	Conway	1907	Public	10,869	Bears & Sugar Bears	1928–29	1992–93	Gulf South (GSC) (NCAA D-II) (1993–94 to 2005–06); Southland (SLC) (NCAA D-I) (2006–07 to 2020–21)	Atlantic Sun (ASUN) (NCAA D-I) (2021–22 to present) (United (UAC) (NCAA D-I) in 2026–27)
Henderson State University	Arkadelphia	1890	Public	3,530	Reddies	1930–31	1992–93	Gulf South (GSC) (NCAA D-II) (1993–94 to 2010–11)	Great American (GAC) (NCAA D-II) (2011–12 to present)
Hendrix College (Note: Hendrix disbanded its football program after the 1960 fall season (1960–61 school year), but continued to compete in the AIC in other sports.)	Conway	1876	United Methodist	1,400	Warriors	1929–30	1991–92	Southern (SCAC) (NCAA D-III) (1992–93 to 2011–12)	Southern (SAA) (NCAA D-III) (2012–13 to present)

=== Membership timeline ===
Full members
Full members (non-football)
Independent
Other Conference
Other Conference
Great American Conference members

== Commissioners ==
- Heber Lowery McAlister (1948–1956)
- Cliff Shaw (1956–1971)
- Charles Mabern Adcock (1971–1974)
- Leroy Nix Jr. (1974–1978)
- Sid Simpson (1978–1979)
- Harry T. Hall (1979–1993)
- Don Cleek (1994–1995)

== Football ==
=== Football champions ===
Shared championships are shown in italics:

Football conference championships (1927–1995)
School	Total titles	Outright titles	Years
Central Arkansas	22	16	1936 • 1937 • 1938 • 1940 • 1959 • 1962 • 1965 • 1966 • 1976 • 1978 • 1980 • 1981 • 1983 • 1984 • 1985 • 1986 • 1987 • 1988 • 1989 • 1990 • 1991 • 1992
Arkansas Tech	18	15	1928 • 1931 • 1935 • 1939 • 1945 • 1946 • 1947 • 1948 • 1949 • 1954 • 1958 • 1960 • 1961 • 1964 • 1968 • 1970 • 1971 • 1994
Henderson State	13	9	1930 • 1932 • 1933 • 1934 • 1950 • 1959 • 1963 • 1969 • 1973 • 1974 • 1975 • 1977 • 1985
Arkansas–Monticello	11	7	1953 • 1955 • 1956 • 1957 • 1958 • 1963 • 1965 • 1966 • 1967 • 1979 • 1993
Ouachita Baptist	6	3	1934 • 1941 • 1966 • 1970 • 1975 • 1982
Southern Arkansas	5	3	1929 • 1948 • 1951 • 1952 • 1972
Harding	3	0	1972 • 1976 • 1989

== Basketball ==
=== Men's basketball champions ===
Following are the AIC regular-season conference champions from 1928 to 1995 (showing shared championships in italics)
NOTE: Information is incomplete.

Men's basketball regular-season championships (1928–1995)
School	Total titles	Outright titles	Years
Central Arkansas	16	16	1927 • 1928 • 1929 • 1936 • 1937 • 1938 • 1939 • 1945 • 1946 • 1947 • 1956 • 1958 • 1964 • 1985 • 1986 • 1991
Arkansas Tech	16	16	1949 • 1950 • 1951 • 1952 • 1953 • 1954 • 1955 • 1958 • 1960 • 1961 • 1962 • 1985 • 1988 • 1993 • 1994 • 1995
Henderson State	10	10	1957 • 1968 • 1972 • 1973 • 1974 • 1975 • 1976 • 1977 • 1978 • 1981
Hendrix	7	7	1932 • 1979 • 1984 • 1990
Southern Arkansas	6	6	1934 • 1935 • 1966 • 1967 • 1971 • 1989
Ozarks	2	1	1983 • 1992
Arkansas–Monticello	1	1	1956
Ouachita Baptist	1	1	1976

== Baseball ==
=== Baseball champions ===
NOTE: Information is incomplete

Baseball conference championships (1927–1995)
School	Total titles	Outright titles	Years
Central Arkansas	20	19	1928 • 1929 • 1930 • 1933 • 1934 • 1935 • 1936 • 1937 • 1948 • 1949 • 1951 • 1959 • 1961 • 1962 • 1963 • 1967 • 1970 • 1978 • 1980 • 1981
Southern Arkansas	17	14	1953 • 1954 • 1956 • 1968 • 1974 • 1975 • 1977 • 1983 • 1986 • 1987 • 1988 • 1989 • 1990 • 1991 • 1992 • 1994 • 1995
Ouachita Baptist	8	4	1960 • 1961 • 1967 • 1968 • 1969 • 1970 • 1971 • 1972
Arkansas Tech	7	7	1950 • 1964 • 1976 • 1981 • 1985 • 1988 • 1992
Henderson State	7	5	1953 • 1958 • 1965 • 1973 • 1974 • 1979 • 1982
Harding	6	6	1932 • 1933 • 1938 • 1972 • 1976 • 1984
Ozarks	2	1	1949 • 1956
