= Southern Arkansas University =

Public university in Magnolia, Arkansas, US

- Former names: Third District Agricultural School (1909–1925); Agricultural and Mechanical College, Third District (1925–1951); Southern State College (1951–1976)
- Type: Public university
- Established: 1909; 117 years ago
- Academic affiliations: Space-grant
- Endowment: $57 million
- President: Bruno Hicks
- Provost: Robin Sronce (interim)
- Faculty: 297 (fall 2023)
- Students: 5,127 (fall 2023)
- Undergraduates: 3,224 (fall 2023)
- Postgraduates: 1,903 (fall 2023)
- Location: Magnolia, Arkansas, United States; 33°17′30″N 93°14′10″W
- Campus: Rural, Residential 1,418 acres (574 ha)
- Colors: Royal blue and Gold
- Nickname: Muleriders
- Sporting affiliations: NCAA Division II – Great American Conference
- Website: saumag.edu
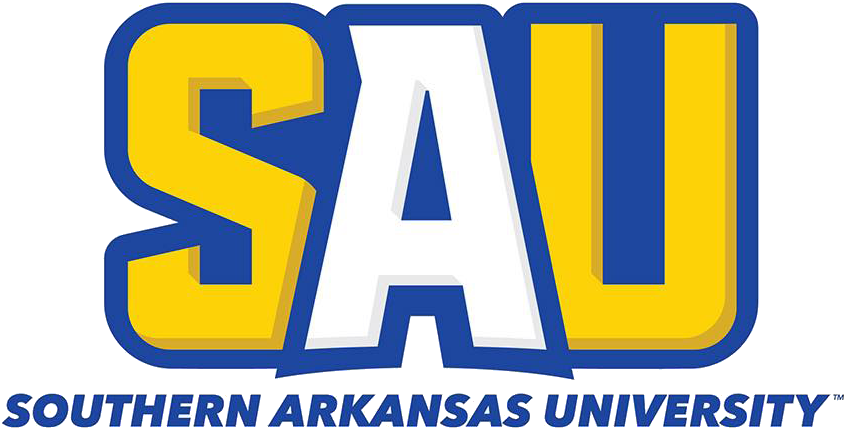

Southern Arkansas University (SAU) is a public university in Magnolia, Arkansas, United States. The university had an enrollment of 5,100 undergraduate and graduate students as of fall 2023.

== History ==
Southern Arkansas University was established by an Act of the Arkansas Legislature in 1909 as a district agricultural high school for southwest Arkansas: Third District Agricultural School, often called by students and faculty "TDAS." Its first term began in January 1911, with its curriculum including only subjects at the secondary school level. In 1925, the State Legislature authorized the school to add two years of college work and to change its name to Agricultural and Mechanical College, Third District (Magnolia A&M). The school continued to offer both high school and junior college courses until 1937, at which time the high school courses were discontinued.

In the fall of 1949, the Board of Trustees, exercising authority vested in it by the State Legislature, decided to develop the college as a four-year, degree-granting institution. The Board authorized the addition of third-year college level courses to being with the fall semester of 1950. Fourth-year courses were added in the fall semester of 1951. By Act Eleven (January 24, 1951), the State Legislature changed the name of the institution to Southern State College.

Like Arkansas' other six state-supported colleges, Southern State College did not allow non-white students to enroll as undergraduates until after 1954's Brown v. Board of Education. Most began to admit African American students—though in tiny numbers and only for Saturday or night classes—in the fall of 1955. SSC's first Black student was Wilmar B. Moss, who "was admitted but only when he refused to accept an initial rebuff," according to an official history of the school. "At SSC from 1956 to 1963 an occasional black student enrolled in a Saturday or summer class, but there is no history of a black undergraduate attending regular classes during fall or spring semesters in those eight years".

More change came after Congress passed the Civil Rights Act of 1964. On May 29, SSC's board of trustees concluded, "Nothing was to be gained by refusing admittance to qualified Negroes." About ten Black undergraduates were allowed to enroll that fall. In 1966, Black students were finally allowed to live in school dormitories. The first Black graduate received her diploma in 1967, and the first Black faculty member began teaching in 1974.

In 1975, the institution was approved and accredited to offer a Master of Education Degree in some areas. The Board of Trustees approved another name change, to Southern Arkansas University by the Board of Higher Education on July 9, 1976, in accordance with Act 343 of the General Assembly of 1975.

Also in 1975, Southwest Technical Institute in Camden, Arkansas, joined the SAU system as Southern Arkansas University Tech.

== Academics ==
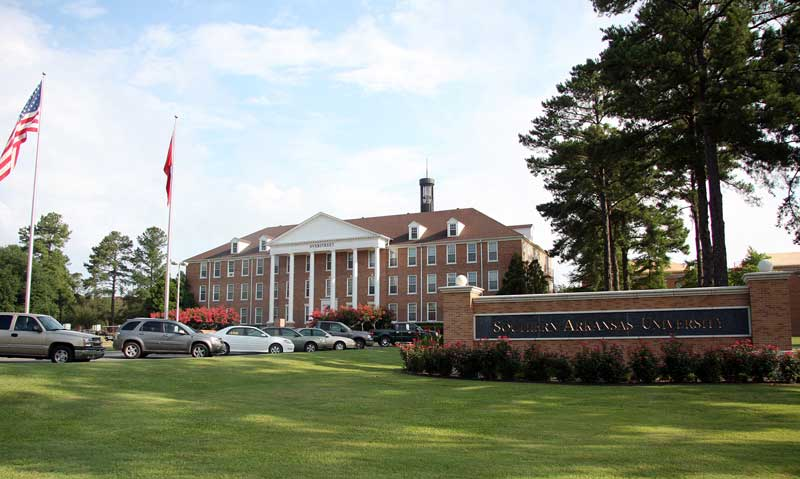
Overstreet Hall, the administrative building

Southern Arkansas University offers 70 undergraduate options, including pre-professional tracks, and 2+2 degree completion programs in four different academic colleges:

- David F. Rankin College of Business
- College of Education and Human Performance
- Dempsey College of Liberal and Performing Arts
- College of Science and Engineering

Southern Arkansas University also offers 19 graduate programs, which are offered either face-to-face, online, or as a hybrid combination of the two.

== Student life ==
Undergraduate demographics as of Fall 2023
Race and ethnicity	Total
White	62%
Black	23%
Hispanic	6%
Two or more races	6%
American Indian/Alaska Native	1%
Asian	1%
International student	1%
Economic diversity
Low-income (Note: The percentage of students who received an income-based federal Pell grant intended for low-income students.)	49%
Affluent (Note: The percentage of students who are a part of the American middle class at the bare minimum.)	51%

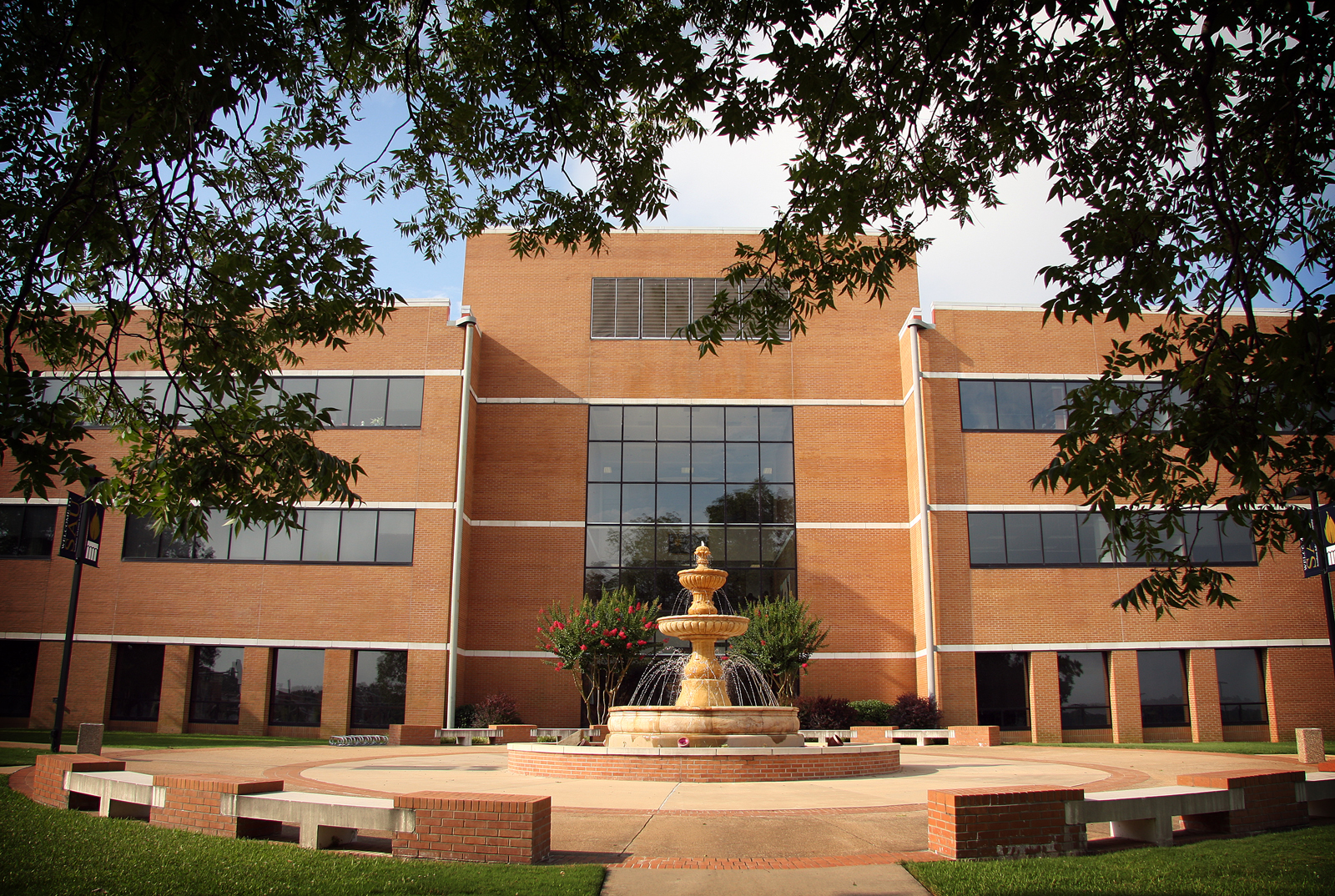
Business building

The university operates several residence halls and apartments, many of which are associated with specific living-learning communities.

=== Traditions ===
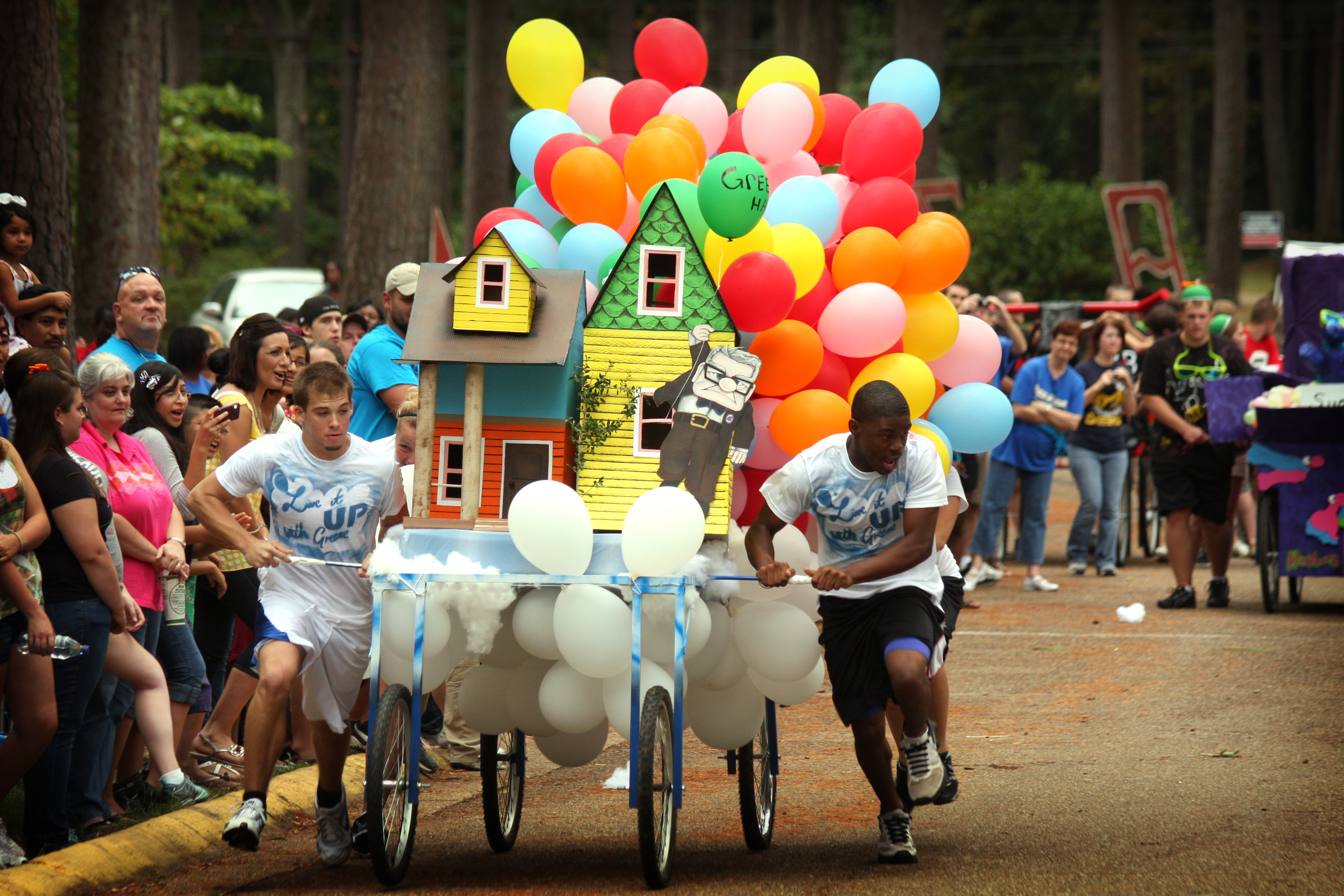
Family Day Bed Race

The annual Bed Races have been a unique tradition as a part of SAU's Family Day festivities since November 7, 1981. Representatives from SAU's residence halls build and race twin-sized "beds" with a mattress platform on top of four bicycle tires. Once constructed, the beds are decorated according to a theme decided annually by the residence's Hall Councils. The bed must have one reclining student, protected by a football helmet, and four runners. Each team competes in a double elimination race, and the winners take home the coveted Bed Race Trophy.

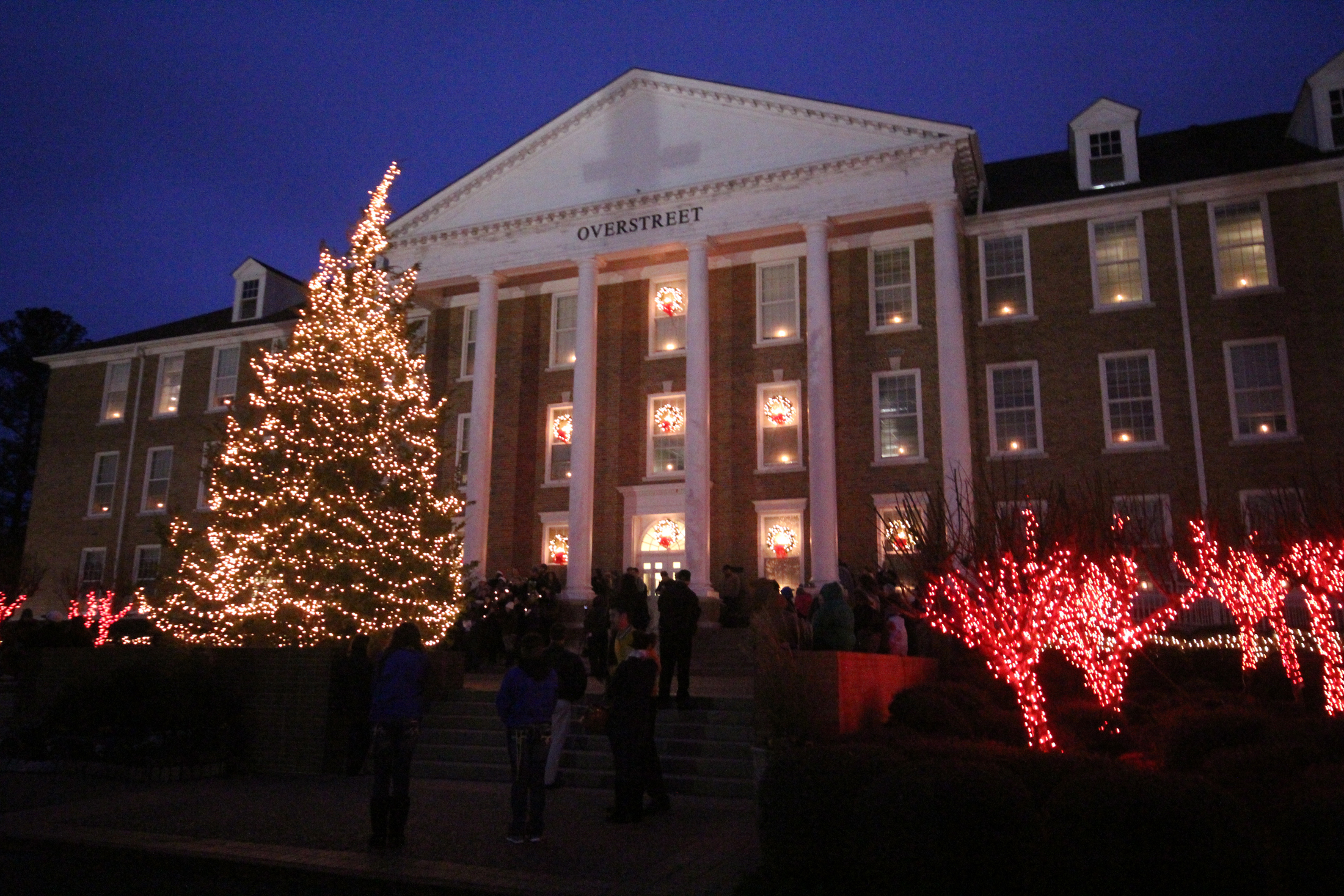
Celebration of Lights

The Celebration of Lights has been a Christmas tradition at SAU since 1984. What once started as a single display to celebrate the 75th anniversary of the school has become an annual part of the holidays in Magnolia. During the celebration, a large Christmas tree is lit in front of Overstreet, as well as light displays all over campus. Additional strands of lights are strewn along the 187-foot SAU bell tower, transforming it into a giant Christmas candle. Included in the festivities each year are: the Magnolia City Christmas Parade, caroling, pictures with Santa Claus for the children, and a holiday buffet dinner for the community.

== Athletics ==
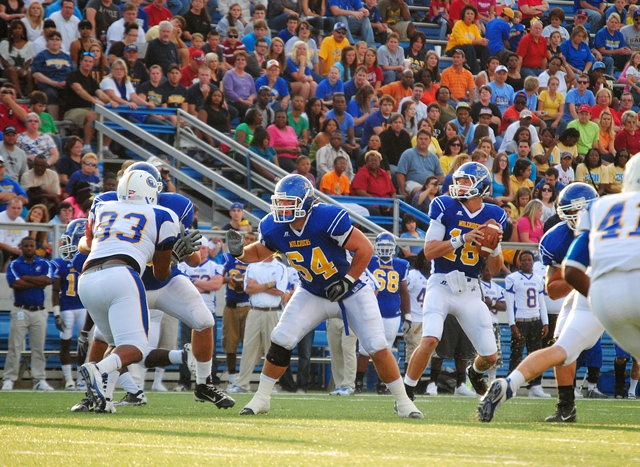
Muleriders football game

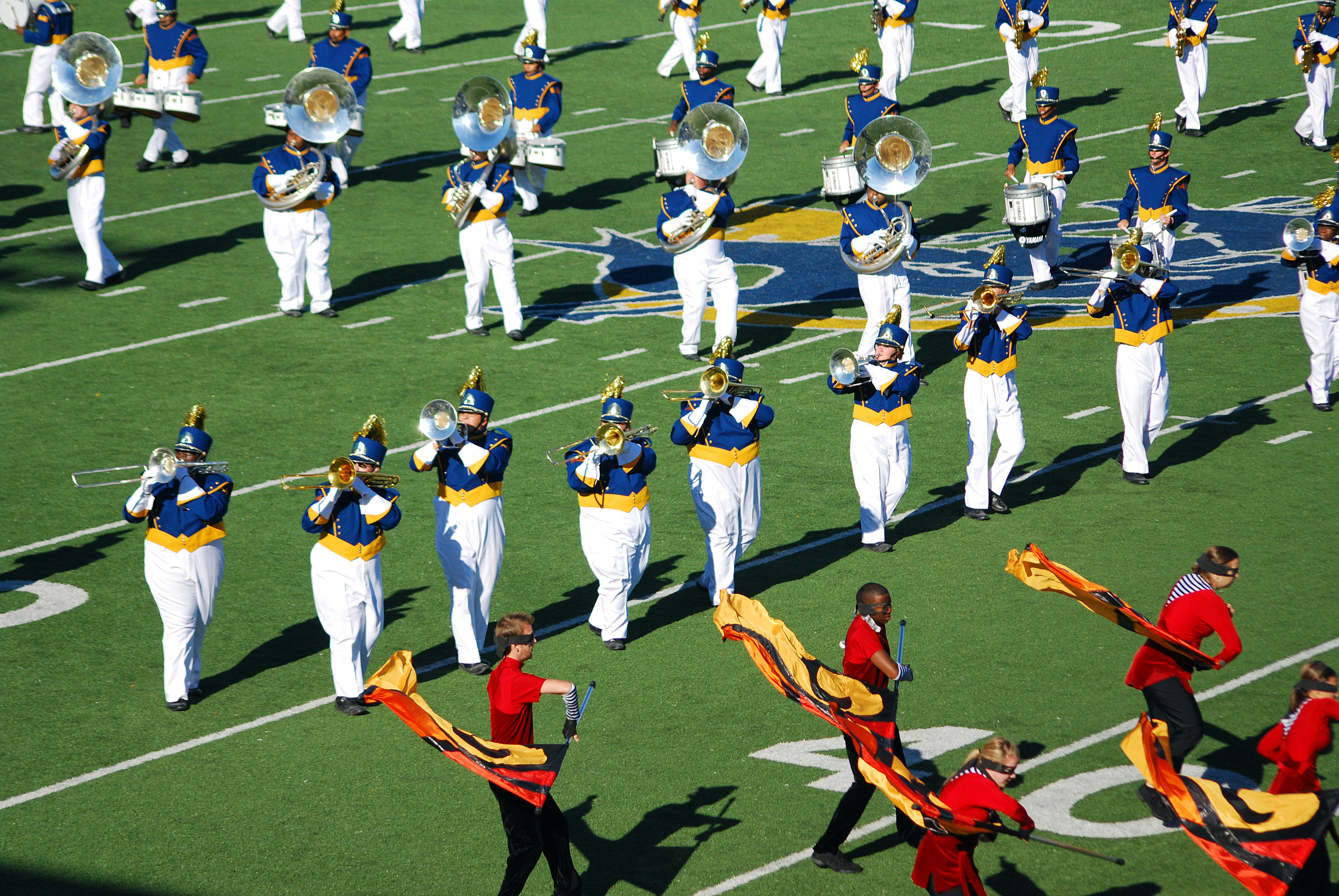
The marching band

Southern Arkansas University is in the NCAA Division II as a member of the Great American Conference.

The university's athletic nicknames are Muleriders and Lady Muleriders. The Muleriders take their name from the legend that the football team in the early 1900s had to ride mules from the college's agricultural department to catch the nearest train 6 miles (9.7 km) north of the college in order to reach out-of-town football games.

The Muleriders football team won the Gulf South Conference Championship in 1997.

In each of 1953 and 1954, the then Southern State College Mulerider tennis team went undefeated winning the Arkansas Intercollegiate Conference in both singles and doubles and was invited by the National Association of Intercollegiate Athletics to represent their district in their National Tennis Championships in 1953.

In 2006 and 2009, the Mulerider baseball team won the Gulf South Conference championship.

== Notable alumni ==
- Jordan Babineaux – football player
- Ken Beck – football player
- Bruce Bennett – Arkansas attorney general (1957–1960 and 1963–1966)
- Ken Brown – football player
- Joyce Elliott – Democratic member of the Arkansas Senate since 2009
- Steve Forbes – basketball coach
- Tanner Hudson – football player
- Dan Kyle – Louisiana politician
- Tracy Lawrence – musician
- Nik Lewis – football player
- Lynn Lowe – politician
- Fred Perry – football player
- Kenneth Pettway – football player
- Ron Simmons – politician
- Greg Stumon – football
- Frank Spooner – businessman and politician
- Harry Thomason – film and television producer and director
- Cedric Thornton – football player
- Tommy Tuberville – football coach and politician
- DeAnn Vaught – politician
- Horace M. Wade – General in the United States Air Force
- Dennis Woodberry – football player

== Notable faculty ==
- Robert Kibbee (died 1982), Chancellor of the City University of New York
