= Jeff Girsch =

American football coach

Current position
- Title: Head coach
- Team: Angelo State
- Conference: LSC
- Record: 55–20

Biographical details
- Born: c. 1971 (age 54–55)

Playing career
- 1990–1993: St. Ambrose
- Position: Wide receiver

Coaching career (HC unless noted)
- 1997–2008: St. Ambrose (assistant)
- 2009–2014: St. Ambrose (DC)
- 2015–2018: Angelo State (DC)
- 2019–present: Angelo State

Head coaching record
- Overall: 55–20
- Tournaments: 3–3 (NCAA D-II playoffs)

Accomplishments and honors

Championships
- 2 LSC (2022, 2024)

Awards
- MSFA Assistant Football Coach of the Year (2008); AFCA Region Four Coach of the Year (2021)

Jeffrey T. Girsch (born c. 1971) is an American college football coach. He is the head football coach for Angelo State University, a position he has held since 2019. He previously coached for St. Ambrose. He played college football for St. Ambrose as a wide receiver.

== Head coaching record ==
Year	Team	Overall	Conference	Standing	Bowl/playoffs	AFCA^{#}	D2^{°}
Angelo State Rams (Lone Star Conference) (2019–present)
2019	Angelo State	8–3	5–3	T–3rd			
2020–21	Angelo State	2–2	0–0	N/A			
2021	Angelo State	11–3	5–2	T–2nd	L NCAA Division II Quarterfinal	11	
2022	Angelo State	12–1	9–0	1st	L NCAA Division II Quarterfinal	7	6
2023	Angelo State	7–3	6–2	3rd			
2024	Angelo State	9–3	9–0	1st	L NCAA Division II First Round	20	24
2025	Angelo State	6–5	4–5	T–5th			
Angelo State:		55–20	38–12				
Total:		55–20					
National championship Conference title Conference division title or championship game berth
