= Jerry Vandergriff =

American football player and coach

Biographical details
- Born: c. 1942; Tulia, Texas, U.S.

Playing career
- 1960: San Angelo
- 1961–1963: Corpus Christi
- Position: Quarterback

Coaching career (HC unless noted)
- 1971–1981: Angelo State (assistant)
- 1982–2004: Angelo State

Head coaching record
- Overall: 143–100–2
- Tournaments: 3–4 (NCAA D-II playoffs)

Accomplishments and honors

Championships
- 2 LSC (1984, 1987); 2 LSC South Division (1999–2000)

Awards
- 3× LSC Coach of the Year (1984, 1987, 1997)

Jerry Vandergriff (born c. 1942) is an American former college football player and coach. He was a football player at Angelo State College in San Angelo, Texas, and the University of Corpus Christi. He was a football coach at Angelo State from 1971 to 2004, including 23 years as head coach. He is the winningest coach in Angelo State history.

== Biography ==
Vandergriff is a native of Tulia, Texas. He began his association with Angelo State Rams football as a freshman football player. He later recalled, "Basically, I played here when I was a freshman coming in and just fell in love with the place." Vandergriff was the quarterback of the 1960 San Angelo team that finished with a 7–3 record and played in the 1960 Hospitality Bowl in Gulfport, Mississippi. When San Angelo temporarily discontinued the football program after the 1960 season, Vandergriff transferred to Texas A&M University–Corpus Christi (then known as the "University of Corpus Christi"), where he received All-Texas and Little All-America honors. Vandergriff received his bachelor's degree at Corpus Christi in 1964 and later received a master's degree from Texas Tech University.

After receiving his degree, Vandergriff coached high school football for seven years. In 1971, he returned to Angelo State as an assistant coach. He was an assistant coach under Grant Teaff, James Cameron and Jim Hess. He spent several years as the team's offensive coordinator, including the 1978 team that compiled a 14–0 record and won the NAIA Division I Football National Championship. He became the head coach in 1982 and served in that capacity through the 2004 season. In 23 years as head coach, he compiled a record of 143–100–2 (95–62–2 in Lone Star Conference play) and had 18 winning seasons. He led Angelo State to four NCAA Division II postseason appearances and was named the Lone Star Conference Coach of the Year in 1984, 1987 and 1997. He is the winningest coach in Angelo State history and ranks 39th all-time in wins among NCAA Division II football coaches.

Vandergriff's best season as a head coach was 1989 when the Rams had an 11–3 record, advanced to the NCAA Division II postseason semifinals, and scored a school-record 466 points (33.3 points per game). Vandergriff had another 10-win season when the 1997 Rams compiled a 10–2 record and outscored their opponents 409 to 241. The Rams under Vandergriff had the winningest record of all Texas universities in the 1980s.

Vandergriff coached 112 first team all-conference selections and 38 All-Americans in 23 years as Angelo State's head coach, including nine players who won the J.V. Sikes Award as the outstanding lineman and two who won the J. W. Rollins Award as the outstanding back)s. His teams won the Lone Star Conference championship in 1984 and 1987 and won the conference's South Division crown in 1999 and 2000.

Vandergriff resigned his position at Angelo State at the end of the 2004 football season. After retiring as the school's football coach and men's athletic director, Vandergriff remained active as a director of the Angelo Football Clinic and a director of the Cactus Bowl, the NCAA D-II All-Star Game. In 2005, he was recognized by the All-American Football Foundation for career accomplishments.

Vandergriff and his wife, Rose Ann Vandergriff, have a son, Bo Vandergriff.

== Head coaching record ==
Year	Team	Overall	Conference	Standing	Bowl/playoffs	NCAA^{#}
Angelo State Rams (Lone Star Conference) (1982–2004)
1982	Angelo State	7–3	4–3	T–2nd		
1983	Angelo State	5–6	3–4	5th		
1984	Angelo State	8–3	4–0	1st		10
1985	Angelo State	7–4	3–2	T–2nd		
1986	Angelo State	6–5	3–3	T–4th		
1987	Angelo State	8–3	4–1	T–1st	L NCAA Division Quarterfinal	9
1988	Angelo State	6–4	5–2	T–2nd		
1989	Angelo State	11–3	5–2	T–2nd	L NCAA Division Semifinal	T–5
1990	Angelo State	7–3	5–2	T–2nd		
1991	Angelo State	6–3–1	4–1–1	T–2nd		
1992	Angelo State	5–5	3–3	T–3rd		
1993	Angelo State	7–3	3–2	T–2nd		
1994	Angelo State	6–5	4–1	T–2nd	L NCAA Division First Round	13
1995	Angelo State	6–3–1	4–2–1	3rd		15
1996	Angelo State	6–4	4–3	T–3rd		
1997	Angelo State	10–2	8–1 / 6–1	2nd / 2nd (South)	L NCAA Division Quarterfinal	6
1998	Angelo State	6–4	6–3 / 6–3	T–5th / T–3rd (South)		
1999	Angelo State	7–4	6–3 / 6–3	T–4th / T–1st (South)		
2000	Angelo State	6–4	4–4 / 4–2	T–7th / T–1st (South)		
2001	Angelo State	6–4	6–2 / 4–2	3rd / 3rd (South)		
2002	Angelo State	2–8	2–6 / 2–4	T–10th / 5th (South)		
2003	Angelo State	3–8	3–5 / 2–4	T–7th / T–4th (South)		
2004	Angelo State	2–9	2–7 / 1–5	T–10th / T–6th (South)		
Angelo State:		143–100–2	95–62–2			
Total:		143–100–2				
National championship Conference title Conference division title or championship game berth
