= Adrian Jones =

Adrian Jones may refer to:

- Adrian Jones (sculptor) (1845–1938), English sculptor and painter
- Adrian Jones (cricketer) (born 1961), English former cricketer
- Adrian Jones (offensive guard) (born 1981), American football offensive guard
- Adrian Jones (American football coach) (born 1974)
- Adrian Jones (musician) (born 1978), Swedish musician, member of Gjallarhorn (band)
