= Frank Turner (American football) =

American football coach (born c. 1982)

Current position
- Title: Head coach
- Team: Lincoln (PA)
- Conference: CIAA
- Record: 6–24

Biographical details
- Education: Albany State University (2005); United States Sports Academy

Playing career
- 2001–2005: Albany State
- Position: Defensive lineman

Coaching career (HC unless noted)
- 2006–2008: Albany HS (NY) (DL)
- 2009: Fort Valley State (GA)
- 2010–2012: Fort Valley State (DT)
- 2013–2014: Kentucky State (DL)
- 2015–2017: Kentucky State (DC)
- 2018–2021: Lincoln (PA) (DC)
- 2022: Lincoln (PA) (AHC/DC)
- 2023–present: Lincoln (PA)

Head coaching record
- Overall: 6–24

Accomplishments and honors

Awards
- First Team All-SIAC (2005)

Franklin Turner II is an American college football coach. He is the head football coach for Lincoln University, a position he has held since 2023. He also coached for Albany High School, Fort Valley State, and Kentucky State. He played college football from Albany State as a defensive lineman.

== Head coaching record ==
| Year | Team | Overall | Conference | Standing | Bowl/playoffs |
|---|---|---|---|---|---|
Lincoln Lions (Central Intercollegiate Athletic Association) (2023–present)
| 2023 | Lincoln | 4–6 | 3–5 | 4th (Northern) | |
| 2024 | Lincoln | 2–8 | 2–5 | 9th | |
| 2025 | Lincoln | 0–10 | 0–7 | 11th | |
| Lincoln: | | 6–24 | 5–17 | | |
| Total: | | 6–24 | | | |
