= 2024 Angelo State Rams football team =

American college football season

2024 Angelo State Rams football

LSC champion

NCAA Division II First Round, L 14–24 vs. Bemidji State
- Conference: Lone Star Conference

Ranking
- AFCA: No. 20
- Record: 9–3 (9–0 LSC)
- Head coach: Jeff Girsch (7th season)
- Offensive coordinator: Kevin Kilmer (6th season)
- Offensive scheme: Spread
- Defensive coordinator: Gary Salgado (1st season)
- Base defense: 3–4
- Home stadium: LeGrand Sports Complex

2024 Lone Star Conference football standings
	Conf.			Overall
Team	W		L	W		L
No. 20 Angelo State $^	9	–	0	9	–	3
No. 24 Central Washington ^	7	–	2	8	–	4
Texas A&M–Kingsville	6	–	3	7	–	4
UT Permian Basin #	6	–	3	7	–	5
Western Oregon	6	–	3	6	–	5
West Texas A&M	5	–	4	5	–	6
Midwestern State	3	–	6	4	–	7
Sul Ross*	2	–	7	3	–	8
Eastern New Mexico	1	–	8	3	–	8
Western New Mexico	0	–	9	2	–	9
$ – Conference champion; ^ – NCAA Division II playoff participant; # – Heritage Bowl participant * – Sul Ross ineligible for postseason play due to transition from NCAA Division III; Rankings from AFCA poll

The 2024 Angelo State Rams football team represented Angelo State University during the 2024 NCAA Division II football season as a member of the Lone Star Conference (LSC). Led by seventh-year head coach Jeff Girsch, the Rams played home games at LeGrand Sports Complex in San Angelo, Texas.

On November 9, with a 38–16 win over Western Oregon, the Rams won the LSC Championship. This was the program's second LSC title in three years.

== Preseason ==
=== LSC media poll ===
The LSC media poll was released on July 25, 2024. The Rams were predicted to finish second in the conference.

== Schedule ==
Date	Time	Opponent	Rank	Site	TV	Result	Attendance
August 30	1:30 p.m.	at Fort Hays State*	No. 24	Lewis Field Stadium; Hays, KS	MIAAN	L 7–21	1,045
September 7	1:00 p.m.	at Emporia State*	No. 24	Francis G. Welch Stadium; Emporia, KS	KMCI	L 12–17	4,817
September 14	6:00 p.m.	Eastern New Mexico		LeGrand Sports Complex; San Angelo, TX	FloSports	W 26–20	3,915
September 21	7:00 p.m.	at Western New Mexico		Altamirano Stadium; Silver City, NM	FloSports	W 21–0	300
October 5	6:00 p.m.	at UT Permian Basin		Astound Broadband Stadium; Midland, TX	FloSports	W 36–7	5,629
October 12	6:00 p.m.	Texas A&M–Kingsville		LeGrand Sports Complex; San Angelo, TX	FloSports	W 38–0	5,237
October 19	7:00 p.m.	at Midwestern State		Memorial Stadium; Wichita Falls, TX	FloSports	W 44–7	5,153
October 26	6:00 p.m.	Sul Ross^{†}		LeGrand Sports Complex; San Angelo, TX	FloSports	W 57–10	5,349
November 2	6:00 p.m.	No. 17 Central Washington		LeGrand Sports Complex; San Angelo, TX	FloSports	W 17–16	3,389
November 9	3:05 p.m.	at Western Oregon	No. 23	McArthur Field; Monmouth, OR	FloSports	W 38–16	2,149
November 16	6:00 p.m.	West Texas A&M	No. 21	LeGrand Sports Complex; San Angelo, TX	FloSports	W 56–19	5,445
November 23	1:00 p.m.	Bemidji State*	No. 16	LeGrand Sports Complex; San Angelo, TX (NCAA Division II First Round)	ESPN+	L 14–24	3,125
*Non-conference game; ^{†}Homecoming; Rankings from AFCA Poll released prior to the game; All times are in Central time

== Rankings ==
Ranking movements Legend: ██ Increase in ranking ██ Decrease in ranking — = Not ranked RV = Received votes
	Week													
Poll	Pre	1	2	3	4	5	6	7	8	9	10	11	12	Final
AFCA	24	24*	RV	RV	RV	RV	RV	RV	RV	RV	23	21	16	20
D2 Football	—	—	—	—	—	—	—	—	—	—	20	19	15	24

* A new poll was not released for this week, so for comparison purposes, the previous week's ranking is inserted in this week's slot.

== Game summaries ==
=== At Fort Hays State ===
No. 24 Angelo State Rams at Fort Hays State Tigers – Game summary

Quarter	1	2	3	4	Total
No. 24 Rams	0	7	0	0	7
Tigers	14	0	0	7	21

at Lewis Field Stadium, Hays, Kansas

- Date: August 30
- Game time: 1:30 p.m. CDT
- Game weather: Rain
- Game attendance: 1,045
- Referee: Brian Moore
- TV: MIAA Network
- Box score, Recap

Game information
First quarter
- FHS – Shane Watts 51-yard pass from Jack Dawson (Carson Arndt kick), 6:07. Hornets 7–0. Drive: 7 plays, 90 yards, 3:10.
- FHS – Ryan Allen 19-yard pass from Jack Dawson (Carson Arndt kick), 1:00. Hornets 14–0. Drive: 8 plays, 90 yards, 3:33.

Second quarter

- ASU – Kaeden Smith 28-yard run (Bradley Larson kick), 13:36. Hornets 14–7. Drive: 6 plays, 65 yards, 2:24.

Third quarter

- No scoring plays

Fourth quarter

- FHS – Shane Watts 6-yard run (Carson Arndt kick), 13:32. Hornets 21–7. Drive: 3 plays, 14 yards, 1:20.

Statistics	ASU	FHS
First downs	14	17
Total yards	203	345
Rushing yards	80	74
Passing yards	123	271
Turnovers	1	2
Time of possession	29:26	30:34

Team	Category	Player	Statistics
Angelo State	Passing	Kaeden Smith	9/13, 75 yards
Angelo State	Rushing	Kaeden Smith	8 rushes, 37 yards, TD
Angelo State	Receiving	Kel Williams	3 receptions, 36 yards
Fort Hays State	Passing	Jack Dawson	23/36, 271 yards, 2 TD, INT
Fort Hays State	Rushing	Shane Watts	20 rushes, 60 yards, TD
Fort Hays State	Receiving	Trevor Watts	6 receptions, 73 yards

=== At Emporia State ===
No. 24 Angelo State Rams at Emporia State Hornets – Game summary

Quarter	1	2	3	4	Total
No. 24 Rams	6	3	3	0	12
Hornets	0	7	7	3	17

at Francis G. Welch Stadium, Emporia, Kansas

- Date: September 7
- Game time: 1:00 p.m. CDT
- Game weather: Sunny, 73 °F (23 °C)
- Game attendance: 4,817
- Referee: Austin Mezzacasa
- TV: KMCI
- Box score, Recap

Game information
First quarter
- ASU – Bradley Larson 26-yard field goal, 5:12. Rams 3–0. Drive: 5 plays, 15 yards, 1:52.
- ASU – Bradley Larson 27-yard field goal, 0:50. Rams 6–0. Drive: 7 plays, 40 yards, 2:23.

Second quarter

- ESU – Tyler Kahmann 2-yard pass from Gunnar Gundy (Caden Dodsen kick), 9:49. Hornets 7–6. Drive: 5 plays, 48 yards, 1:15.
- ASU – Bradley Larson 20-yard field goal, 2:20. Rams 9–7. Drive: 9 plays, 66 yards, 3:51.

Third quarter

- ASU – Bradley Larson 34-yard field goal, 5:20. Rams 12–7. Drive: 9 plays, 33 yards, 2:22.
- ESU – Kingsley Bennett 31-yard pass from Gunnar Gundy (Caden Dodsen kick), 3:35. Hornets 14–12. Drive: 6 plays, 75 yards, 1:45.

Fourth quarter

- ESU – Caden Dodsen 29-yard field goal, 0:48. Hornets 17–12. Drive: 6 plays, 15 yards, 2:15.

Statistics	ASU	ESU
First downs	17	11
Total yards	368	282
Rushing yards	239	30
Passing yards	129	252
Turnovers	0	3
Time of possession	36:32	23:28

Team	Category	Player	Statistics
Angelo State	Passing	Braeden Fuller	11/30, 118 yards
Angelo State	Rushing	Kaeden Smith	11 rushes, 94 yards
Angelo State	Receiving	Zeek Freeman	4 receptions, 59 yards
Emporia State	Passing	Gunnar Gundy	25/39, 252 yards, 2 TD, 2 INT
Emporia State	Rushing	Billy Ross Jr.	14 rushes, 19 yards
Emporia State	Receiving	Tyler Kahmann	8 receptions, 110 yards, TD

=== Eastern New Mexico ===
Eastern New Mexico Greyhounds at Angelo State Rams – Game summary

Quarter	1	2	3	4	Total
Greyhounds	3	10	0	7	20
Rams	7	10	9	0	26

at LeGrand Sports Complex, San Angelo, Texas

- Date: September 14
- Game time: 6:00 p.m. CDT
- Game weather: Cloudy, 91 °F (33 °C)
- Game attendance: 3,915
- Referee: Kenny Kelarek
- TV: FloSports
- Box score, Recap

Game information
First quarter
- ASU – Jayden Jones 1-yard run (Bradley Larson kick), 10:00. Rams 7–0. Drive: 6 plays, 23 yards, 2:14.
- ENM – Cooper Hamilton 30-yard field goal, 1:28. Rams 7–3. Drive: 17 plays, 73 yards, 8:26.

Second quarter

- ASU – Bradley Larson 43-yard field goal, 13:00. Rams 10–3. Drive: 9 plays, 49 yards, 3:28.
- ENM – Ron Craten 1-yard run (Cooper Hamilton kick), 6:10. Tied 10–10. Drive: 15 plays, 75 yards, 6:50.
- ASU – Brayden Wilcox 11-yard run (Bradley Larson kick), 1:53. Rams 17–10. Drive: 4 plays, 53 yards, 1:46.
- ENM – Cooper Hamilton 29-yard field goal, 0:19. Rams 17–13. Drive: 5 plays, 64 yards, 1:34.

Third quarter

- ASU – Bradley Larson 28-yard field goal, 7:38. Rams 20–13. Drive: 11 plays, 72 yards, 3:56.
- ASU – Hunter Wallis 8-yard pass from Braeden Fuller (run failed), 5:57. Rams 26–13. Drive: 3 plays, 9 yards, 0:42.

Fourth quarter

- ENM – Elijah Zeh 11-yard run (Cooper Hamilton kick), 6:27. Rams 26–20. Drive: 17 plays, 80 yards, 7:42.

Statistics	ENM	ASU
First downs	25	20
Total yards	371	366
Rushing yards	303	195
Passing yards	68	171
Turnovers	2	1
Time of possession	35:56	24:04

Team	Category	Player	Statistics
Eastern New Mexico	Passing	Mario Sanchez	3/7, 68 yards, INT
Eastern New Mexico	Rushing	Ja'Calvin Newsom	15 rushes, 83 yards
Eastern New Mexico	Receiving	Jeremiah Moore	1 reception, 57 yards
Angelo State	Passing	Braeden Fuller	14/23, 171 yards, TD
Angelo State	Rushing	Brayden Wilcox	13 rushes, 82 yards, TD
Angelo State	Receiving	Kel Williams	3 receptions, 57 yards

=== At Western New Mexico ===
Angelo State Rams at Western New Mexico Mustangs – Game summary

Quarter	1	2	3	4	Total
Rams	0	7	7	7	21
Mustangs	0	0	0	0	0

at Altamirano Stadium, Silver City, New Mexico

- Date: September 21
- Game time: 7:00 p.m. CDT/6:00 p.m. MDT
- Game weather: Sunny, 73 °F (23 °C)
- Game attendance: 300
- Referee: Jon Sasse
- TV: FloSports
- Box score, Recap

Game information
First quarter
- No scoring plays

Second quarter

- ASU – Kel Williams 7-yard pass from Braeden Fuller (Bradley Larson kick), 2:52. Rams 7–0. Drive: 9 plays, 79 yards, 3:38.

Third quarter

- ASU – Braeden Fuller 39-yard run (Bradley Larson kick), 11:59. Rams 14–0. Drive: 3 plays, 41 yards, 0:52.

Fourth quarter

- ASU – Kyle Bradford 17-yard pass from Braeden Fuller (Bradley Larson kick), 3:07. Rams 21–0. Drive: 9 plays, 70 yards, 3:47.

Statistics	ASU	WNM
First downs	23	11
Total yards	388	159
Rushing yards	166	51
Passing yards	222	108
Turnovers	0	2
Time of possession	31:05	23:27

Team	Category	Player	Statistics
Angelo State	Passing	Braeden Fuller	23/38, 222 yards, 2 TD
Angelo State	Rushing	Braeden Fuller	11 rushes, 74 yards, TD
Angelo State	Receiving	Kel Williams	6 receptions, 70 yards, TD
Western New Mexico	Passing	Josh Magana	12/28, 90 yards, INT
Western New Mexico	Rushing	Jamon Chambers	13 rushes, 57 yards
Western New Mexico	Receiving	Davey Morales	7 receptions, 82 yards

=== At UT Permian Basin ===
Angelo State Rams at UT Permian Basin Falcons – Game summary

Quarter	1	2	3	4	Total
Rams	0	15	7	14	36
Falcons	0	0	0	7	7

at Astound Broadband Stadium, Midland, Texas

- Date: October 5
- Game time: 6:00 p.m. CDT
- Game weather: Sunny
- Game attendance: 5,629
- Referee: Joshua Bannerman
- TV: FloSports
- Box score, Recap

Game information
First quarter
- No scoring plays

Second quarter

- ASU – Kenton Allen 5-yard fumble return (Bradley Larson kick), 6:04. Rams 7–0.
- ASU – Brayden Wilcox 6-yard pass from Braeden Fuller (Braeden Fuller pass to Alex Wyatt), 0:47. Rams 15–0. Drive: 7 plays, 65 yards, 3:04.

Third quarter

- ASU – Braeden Fuller 86-yard run (Bradley Larson kick), 12:07. Rams 22–0. Drive: 1 play, 86 yards, 0:13.

Fourth quarter

- ASU – Braeden Fuller 2-yard run (Bradley Larson kick), 11:54. Rams 29–0. Drive: 14 plays, 70 yards, 7:25.
- UTPB – Ben Patterson 38-yard pass from Issac Mooring (Rafael Vargas kick), 5:45. Rams 29–7. Drive: 6 plays, 59 yards, 1:39.
- ASU – Braeden Fuller 4-yard run (Bradley Larson kick), 1:52. Rams 36–7. Drive: 7 plays, 48 yards, 3:53.

Statistics	ASU	UTPB
First downs	14	14
Total yards	280	277
Rushing yards	168	108
Passing yards	112	169
Turnovers	1	2
Time of possession	28:05	31:55

Team	Category	Player	Statistics
Angelo State	Passing	Braeden Fuller	9/15, 112 yards, TD
Angelo State	Rushing	Braeden Fuller	15 rushes, 146 yards, 3 TD
Angelo State	Receiving	Corey Sandolph	2 receptions, 43 yards
UT Permian Basin	Passing	Issac Mooring	7/17, 113 yards, TD
UT Permian Basin	Rushing	Kory Harris	18 rushes, 61 yards
UT Permian Basin	Receiving	Deon Cook	4 receptions, 53 yards

=== Texas A&M–Kingsville ===
Texas A&M–Kingsville Javelinas at Angelo State Rams – Game summary

Quarter	1	2	3	4	Total
Javelinas	0	0	0	0	0
Rams	14	7	14	3	38

at LeGrand Sports Complex, San Angelo, Texas

- Date: October 12
- Game time: 6:00 p.m. CDT
- Game weather: Sunny, 91 °F (33 °C)
- Game attendance: 5,237
- Referee: James Minor
- TV: FloSports
- Box score, Recap

Game information
First quarter
- ASU – Braeden Fuller 1-yard run (Bradley Larson kick), 3:48. Rams 7–0. Drive: 2 plays, 1 yard, 0:57.
- ASU – Kel Williams 32-yard pass from Braeden Fuller (Bradley Larson kick), 0:19. Rams 14–0. Drive: 1 play, 32 yards, 0:08.

Second quarter

- ASU – Kel Williams 3-yard pass from Braeden Fuller (Bradley Larson kick), 2:39. Rams 21–0. Drive: 5 plays, 55 yards, 2:53.

Third quarter

- ASU – Hunter Wallis 9-yard pass from Braeden Fuller (Bradley Larson kick), 12:07. Rams 28–0. Drive: 6 plays, 75 yards, 2:53.
- ASU – Donny Bishop 40-yard pass from Braeden Fuller (Bradley Larson kick), 7:46. Rams 35–0. Drive: 6 plays, 77 yards, 3:09.

Fourth quarter

- ASU – Bradley Larson 24-yard field goal, 13:52. Rams 38–0. Drive: 9 plays, 70 yards, 3:43.

Statistics	AMK	ASU
First downs	9	17
Total yards	182	372
Rushing yards	66	30
Passing yards	116	342
Turnovers	3	0
Time of possession	31:35	28:25

Team	Category	Player	Statistics
Texas A&M–Kingsville	Passing	Teague Sedtal	17/29, 116 yards, 2 INT
Texas A&M–Kingsville	Rushing	Roger Hagan	20 rushes, 77 yards
Texas A&M–Kingsville	Receiving	Isaiah Smalls	2 receptions, 38 yards
Angelo State	Passing	Braeden Fuller	18/33, 332 yards, 4 TD
Angelo State	Rushing	Zeek Freeman	2 rushes, 14 yards
Angelo State	Receiving	Zeek Freeman	2 receptions, 65 yards

=== At Midwestern State ===
Angelo State Rams at Midwestern State Mustangs – Game summary

Quarter	1	2	3	4	Total
Rams	7	27	10	0	44
Mustangs	0	0	0	7	7

at Memorial Stadium, Wichita Falls, Texas

- Date: October 19
- Game time: 7:00 p.m. CDT
- Game weather: Sunny, 76 °F (24 °C)
- Game attendance: 5,153
- Referee: Kenny Kelarek
- Box score, Recap

Game information
First quarter
- ASU – Braeden Fuller 1-yard run (Bradley Larson kick), 13:05. Rams 7–0. Drive: 1 play, 1 yard, 0:05.

Second quarter

- ASU – Cameron Dischler 6-yard run (run failed), 13:36. Rams 13–0. Drive: 9 plays, 68 yards, 3:09.
- ASU – Brayden Wilcox 4-yard run (Bradley Larson kick), 8:53. Rams 20–0. Drive: 5 plays, 66 yards, 2:00.
- ASU – Zeek Freeman 20-yard run (Bradley Larson kick), 6:52. Rams 27–0. Drive: 1 play, 20 yards, 0:08.
- ASU – Hunter Wallis 20-yard pass from Braeden Fuller (Bradley Larson kick), 0:00. Rams 34–0. Drive: 8 plays, 75 yards, 1:40.

Third quarter

- ASU – Bradley Larson 37-yard field goal, 12:04. Rams 37–0. Drive: 7 plays, 55 yards, 2:56.
- ASU – Anthony Jones 69-yard pass from Kaeden Smith (Bradley Larson kick), 0:48. Rams 44–0. Drive: 2 plays, 71 yards, 0:42.

Fourth quarter

- MSU – Jimmy Trilla 11-yard pass from Matthew Duncan (Joseph Carlson kick), 2:11. Rams 44–7. Drive: 15 plays, 70 yards, 8:19.

Statistics	ASU	MSU
First downs	20	13
Total yards	391	241
Rushing yards	150	105
Passing yards	241	136
Turnovers	2	2
Time of possession	22:47	37:13

Team	Category	Player	Statistics
Angelo State	Passing	Braeden Fuller	15/19, 169 yards, TD
Angelo State	Rushing	Braeden Fuller	6 rushes, 45 yards, TD
Angelo State	Receiving	Anthony Jones	1 reception, 69 yards, TD
Midwestern State	Passing	Andrew Knebel	7/17, 72 yards, INT
Midwestern State	Rushing	Jalen March	11 rushes, 24 yards
Midwestern State	Receiving	Jailyn Robertson	1 reception, 33 yards

=== Sul Ross ===
Sul Ross Lobos at Angelo State Rams – Game summary

Quarter	1	2	3	4	Total
Lobos	3	7	0	0	10
Rams	14	22	7	14	57

at LeGrand Sports Complex, San Angelo, Texas

- Date: October 26
- Game time: 6:00 p.m. CST
- Game weather: Sunny, 81 °F (27 °C)
- Game attendance: 5,349
- Referee: Wayne Elliott
- TV: FloSports
- Box score, Recap

Game information
First quarter
- SRS – Carlos Arreola 41-yard field goal, 10:38. Lobos 3–0. Drive: 5 plays, 56 yards, 2:09.
- ASU – Eric Rascoe 26-yard interception return (Bradley Larson kick), 7:00. Rams 7–3.
- ASU – Cameron Dischler 2-yard run (Bradley Larson kick), 0:47. Rams 14–3. Drive: 8 plays, 58 yards, 3:54.

Second quarter

- SRS – Yamil Oaxaca 23-yard pass from Andrew Martinez (Carlos Arreola kick), 8:37. Rams 14–10. Drive: 12 plays, 75 yards, 7:10.
- ASU – Jayden Jones 4-yard run (Cade Fuller run), 4:41. Rams 22–10. Drive: 7 plays, 93 yards, 3:50.
- ASU – Cameron Dischler 2-yard run (Bradley Larson kick), 1:58. Rams 29–10. Drive: 5 plays, 48 yards, 1:13.
- ASU – Cameron Dischler 27-yard pass from Braeden Fuller (Bradley Larson kick), 1:37. Rams 36–10. Drive: 1 play, 27 yards, 0:10.

Third quarter

- ASU – Jayden Jones 1-yard run (Bradley Larson kick), 3:57. Rams 43–10. Drive: 6 plays, 54 yards, 3:00.

Fourth quarter

- ASU – Zeek Freeman 38-yard pass from Kaeden Smith (Bradley Larson kick), 14:12. Rams 50–10. Drive: 7 plays, 72 yards, 3:38.
- ASU – Canon Wiese 8-yard run (Bradley Larson kick), 4:20. Rams 57–10. Drive: 4 plays, 42 yards, 1:52.

Statistics	SRS	ASU
First downs	8	28
Total yards	173	548
Rushing yards	39	195
Passing yards	134	353
Turnovers	2	1
Time of possession	25:39	34:21

Team	Category	Player	Statistics
Sul Ross	Passing	Andrew Martinez	11/18, 128 yards, TD, 2 INT
Sul Ross	Rushing	Jordan Morales	10 rushes, 31 yards
Sul Ross	Receiving	Austin Ogunmakin	2 receptions, 57 yards
Angelo State	Passing	Braeden Fuller	17/23, 287 yards, TD
Angelo State	Rushing	Jayden Jones	11 rushes, 80 yards, 2 TD
Angelo State	Receiving	Zeek Freeman	3 receptions, 81 yards, TD

=== No. 17 Central Washington ===
No. 17 Central Washington Wildcats at Angelo State Rams – Game summary

Quarter	1	2	3	4	Total
No. 17 Wildcats	3	7	0	6	16
Rams	7	10	0	0	17

at LeGrand Sports Complex, San Angelo, Texas

- Date: November 2
- Game time: 6:00 p.m. CDT
- Game weather: Cloudy, 78 °F (26 °C)
- Game attendance: 3,389
- Referee: Robert Newton
- TV: FloSports
- Box score, Recap

Game information
First quarter
- ASU – Zeek Freeman 75-yard pass from Braeden Fuller (Bradley Larson kick), 14:51. Rams 7–0. Drive: 1 play, 75 yards, 0:09.
- CWU – Cooper Britton 22-yard field goal, 0:00. Rams 7–3. Drive: 12 plays, 71 yards, 5:58.

Second quarter

- ASU – Bradley Larson 47-yard field goal, 12:17. Rams 10–3. Drive: 6 plays, 41 yards, 2:43.
- CWU – Kennedy McGill 8-yard run (Cooper Britton kick), 6:56. Tied 10–10. Drive: 9 plays, 75 yards, 5:21.
- ASU – Jayden Jones 1-yard run (Bradley Larson kick), 0:58. Rams 17–10. Drive: 6 plays, 53 yards, 1:21.

Third quarter

- No scoring plays

Fourth quarter

- CWU – Tyler Flanagan 9-yard run (kick failed), 0:34. Rams 17–16. Drive: 9 plays, 57 yards, 5:14.

Statistics	CWU	ASU
First downs	17	11
Total yards	373	291
Rushing yards	237	123
Passing yards	136	168
Turnovers	1	0
Time of possession	37:21	22:39

Team	Category	Player	Statistics
Central Washington	Passing	Kennedy McGill	10/19, 136 yards, INT
Central Washington	Rushing	Kennedy McGill	21 rushes, 130 yards, TD
Central Washington	Receiving	Marcus Cook	5 receptions, 73 yards
Angelo State	Passing	Braeden Fuller	8/15, 168 yards, TD
Angelo State	Rushing	Braeden Fuller	22 rushes, 94 yards
Angelo State	Receiving	Zeek Freeman	1 reception, 75 yards, TD

=== At Western Oregon ===
No. 23 Angelo State Rams at Western Oregon Wolves – Game summary

Quarter	1	2	3	4	Total
No. 23 Rams	3	14	14	7	38
Wolves	3	10	3	0	16

at McArthur Field, Monmouth, Oregon

- Date: November 9
- Game time: 3:05 p.m. CST/1:05 p.m. PST
- Game weather: Sunny, 57 °F (14 °C)
- Game attendance: 2,149
- Referee: Joe Greer
- TV: FloSports
- Box score, Recap

Game information
First quarter
- WOU – Keaton Emmett 21-yard field goal, 8:17. Wolves 3–0. Drive: 12 plays, 63 yards, 5:04.
- ASU – Bradley Larson 20-yard field goal, 2:06. Tied 3–3. Drive: 13 plays, 72 yards, 6:06.

Second quarter

- ASU – Jayden Jones 11-yard run (Bradley Larson kick), 13:35. Rams 10–3. Drive: 5 plays, 81 yards, 1:30.
- ASU – Braeden Fuller 12-yard run (Bradley Larson kick), 12:49. Rams 17–3. Drive: 1 play, 12 yards, 0:06.
- WOU – Keaton Emmett 25-yard field goal, 6:28. Rams 17–6. Drive: 5 plays, 16 yards, 1:56.
- WOU – Jeremiah Schwartz 0-yard punt return (Keaton Emmett kick), 5:21. Rams 17–13.

Third quarter

- ASU – Zorhan Rideaux 80-yard pass from Braeden Fuller (Bradley Larson kick), 11:06. Rams 24–13. Drive: 3 plays, 81 yards, 1:24.
- WOU – Keaton Emmett 40-yard field goal, 6:10. Rams 24–16. Drive: 13 plays, 59 yards, 4:52.
- ASU – Zorhan Rideaux 33-yard pass from Braeden Fuller (Bradley Larson kick), 4:11. Rams 31–16. Drive: 5 plays, 60 yards, 1:59.

Fourth quarter

- ASU – Cameron Dischler 68-yard pass from Braeden Fuller (Bradley Larson kick), 7:22. Rams 38–16. Drive: 3 plays, 74 yards, 1:26.

Statistics	ASU	WOU
First downs	17	18
Total yards	428	289
Rushing yards	113	134
Passing yards	315	155
Turnovers	0	4
Time of possession	28:40	31:20

Team	Category	Player	Statistics
Angelo State	Passing	Braeden Fuller	13/25, 315 yards, 3 TD
Angelo State	Rushing	Cameron Dischler	9 rushes, 37 yards
Angelo State	Receiving	Zorhan Rideaux	3 receptions, 124 yards, 2 TD
Western Oregon	Passing	Jordan McCarty	7/10, 101 yards
Western Oregon	Rushing	Kaino Sayre	21 rushes, 93 yards
Western Oregon	Receiving	Damon Hickock	4 receptions, 68 yards

=== West Texas A&M ===
West Texas A&M Buffaloes at No. 21 Angelo State Rams – Game summary

Quarter	1	2	3	4	Total
Buffaloes	7	12	0	0	19
No. 21 Rams	14	21	14	7	56

at LeGrand Sports Complex, San Angelo, Texas

- Date: November 16
- Game time: 6:00 p.m. CST
- Game weather: Cloudy, 72 °F (22 °C)
- Game attendance: 5,445
- Referee: Duane Martin
- TV: FloSports
- Box score, Recap

Game information
First quarter
- WTX – Kanon Gibson 3-yard run (Cason Polivoda kick), 13:53. Buffaloes 7–0. Drive: 3 plays, 19 yards, 0:59.
- ASU – Corey Sandolph 33-yard pass from Braeden Fuller (Bradley Larson kick), 10:25. Tied 7–7. Drive: 8 plays, 75 yards, 3:28.
- ASU – Braeden Fuller 80-yard run (Bradley Larson kick), 5:49. Rams 14–7. Drive: 3 plays, 96 yards, 1:19.

Second quarter

- ASU – Cameron Dischler 15-yard pass from Braeden Fuller (Bradley Larson kick), 14:55. Rams 21–7. Drive: 5 plays, 64 yards, 1:57.
- WTX – Brennan Ray 5-yard pass from Kanon Gibson (kick blocked), 12:48. Rams 21–13. Drive: 4 plays, 75 yards, 2:07.
- ASU – Kyle Bradford 53-yard pass from Braeden Fuller (Bradley Larson kick), 11:24. Rams 28–13. Drive: 3 plays, 65 yards, 1:24.
- ASU – Braeden Fuller 1-yard run (Bradley Larson kick), 6:51. Rams 35–13. Drive: 7 plays, 49 yards, 3:26.
- WTX – Tucker Swoboda 18-yard pass from Kanon Gibson (pass failed), 1:24. Rams 35–19. Drive: 11 plays, 60 yards, 5:27.

Third quarter

- ASU – Andrew Pitts 45-yard interception return (Bradley Larson kick), 13:24. Rams 42–19.
- ASU – Braeden Fuller 23-yard run (Bradley Larson kick), 6:29. Rams 49–19. Drive: 6 plays, 85 yards, 3:25.

Fourth quarter

- ASU – Cameron Dischler 16-yard pass from Braeden Fuller (Bradley Larson kick), 14:53. Rams 56–19. Drive: 11 plays, 66 yards, 5:40.

Statistics	WT	ASU
First downs	11	27
Total yards	225	573
Rushing yards	106	322
Passing yards	119	251
Turnovers	1	1
Time of possession	27:46	32:14

Team	Category	Player	Statistics
West Texas A&M	Passing	Kanon Gibson	9/20, 119 yards, 2 TD, INT
West Texas A&M	Rushing	Tre'Jon Henderson	13 rushes, 42 yards
West Texas A&M	Receiving	Tucker Swoboda	4 receptions, 103 yards, TD
Angelo State	Passing	Braeden Fuller	13/23, 238 yards, 4 TD
Angelo State	Rushing	Braeden Fuller	15 rushes, 187 yards, 3 TD
Angelo State	Receiving	Kyle Bradford	2 receptions, 87 yards, TD

=== Bemidji State (NCAA Division II First Round) ===
NCAA Division II First Round
Bemidji State Beavers at No. 16 Angelo State Rams – Game summary

Quarter	1	2	3	4	Total
Beavers	7	7	0	10	24
No. 16 Rams	0	7	0	7	14

at LeGrand Sports Complex, San Angelo, Texas

- Date: November 23
- Game time: 1:00 p.m. CST
- Game weather: Sunny, 74 °F (23 °C)
- Game attendance: 3,125
- Referee: Cecil Harrison
- TV: ESPN+
- Box score, Recap

Game information
First quarter
- BSU – Sam McGath 5-yard run (Connor Mantelli kick), 4:34. Beavers 7–0. Drive: 1 play, 5 yards, 0:07.

Second quarter

- ASU – Alex Wyatt 1-yard run (Bradley Larson kick), 10:44. Tied 7–7. Drive: 1 play, 1 yard, 0:05.
- BSU – Brice Peters 9-yard pass from Sam McGath (Connor Mantelli kick), 3:12. Beavers 14–7. Drive: 14 plays, 75 yards, 7:32.

Third quarter

- No scoring plays

Fourth quarter

- BSU – Connor Mantelli 47-yard field goal, 10:27. Beavers 17–7. Drive: 4 plays, 4 yards, 1:38.
- ASU – Corey Sandolph 8-yard pass from Braeden Fuller (Bradley Larson kick), 5:57. Beavers 17–14. Drive: 10 plays, 75 yards, 4:30.
- BSU – Connor Carver 59-yard run (Connor Mantelli kick), 2:07. Beavers 24–14. Drive: 1 play, 59 yards, 0:11.

Statistics	BSU	ASU
First downs	11	13
Total yards	262	231
Rushing yards	231	93
Passing yards	31	138
Turnovers	1	2
Time of possession	31:42	28:18

Team	Category	Player	Statistics
Bemidji State	Passing	Sam McGath	7/14, 31 yards, TD, INT
Bemidji State	Rushing	Connor Carver	8 rushes, 114 yards, TD
Bemidji State	Receiving	Brice Peters	3 receptions, 31 yards, TD
Angelo State	Passing	Braeden Fuller	14/32, 138 yards, TD, 2 INT
Angelo State	Rushing	Cameron Dischler	7 rushes, 33 yards
Angelo State	Receiving	Kel Williams	3 receptions, 44 yards

== Weekly awards ==
- LSC Offensive Player of the Week

Braeden Fuller (week 3 vs. Western New Mexico)
Braeden Fuller (week 5 vs. UT Permian Basin)
Braeden Fuller (week 6 vs. Texas A&M–Kingsville)
Braeden Fuller (week 10 vs. Western Oregon)
Braeden Fuller (week 11 vs. West Texas A&M)

- LSC Defensive Player of the Week

Kenton Allen (week 5 vs. UT Permian Basin)
Kenton Allen (week 9 vs. Central Washington)
Eric Rascoe (week 10 vs. Western Oregon)

- LSC Special Teams Player of the Week

Cade Fuller (week 6 vs. Texas A&M–Kingsville)
