= Tom Godek =

American football coach (born c. 1965)

Current position
- Title: Offensive line coach
- Team: Westfield State
- Conference: MASCAC

Biographical details
- Born: c. 1965 (age 60–61)
- Education: Southern Connecticut State University (1988)

Playing career
- 1984–1987: Southern Connecticut
- Position: Offensive lineman

Coaching career (HC unless noted)
- 1994–2000: American International (AHC/OL)
- 2001–2013: Southern Connecticut (OC)
- 2014–2024: Southern Connecticut
- 2025–present: Westfield State (OL)

Head coaching record
- Overall: 38–66

Accomplishments and honors

Awards
- 2× All-New England (1986–1987); 1× All-ECAC (1987)

Thomas Godek (born c. 1965) is an American college football coach. He is the offensive line coach for Westfield State University, a position he has held since 2025. He was the head football coach for Southern Connecticut State University from 2014 to 2024. He also coached for American International. He played college football for Southern Connecticut as an offensive lineman.

== Head coaching record ==
Year	Team	Overall	Conference	Standing	Bowl/playoffs
Southern Connecticut Owls (Northeast-10 Conference) (2014–2024)
2014	Southern Connecticut	2–9	2–7	9th	
2015	Southern Connecticut	4–7	3–6	8th	
2016	Southern Connecticut	6–5	6–3	T–3rd	
2017	Southern Connecticut	5–5	5–4	T–4th	
2018	Southern Connecticut	4–6	3–6	7th	
2019	Southern Connecticut	2–8	2–6	8th	
2020–21	No team—COVID-19				
2021	Southern Connecticut	4–6	3–5	T–5th	
2022	Southern Connecticut	3–8	2–5	6th	
2023	Southern Connecticut	4–6	3–4	T–4th	
2024	Southern Connecticut	4–6	3–5	T–6th	
Southern Connecticut:		38–66	32–51		
Total:		38–66			
