= United States Sports University =

Private university in Daphne, Alabama, US

Coordinates: 30.639197°N 87.911836°W

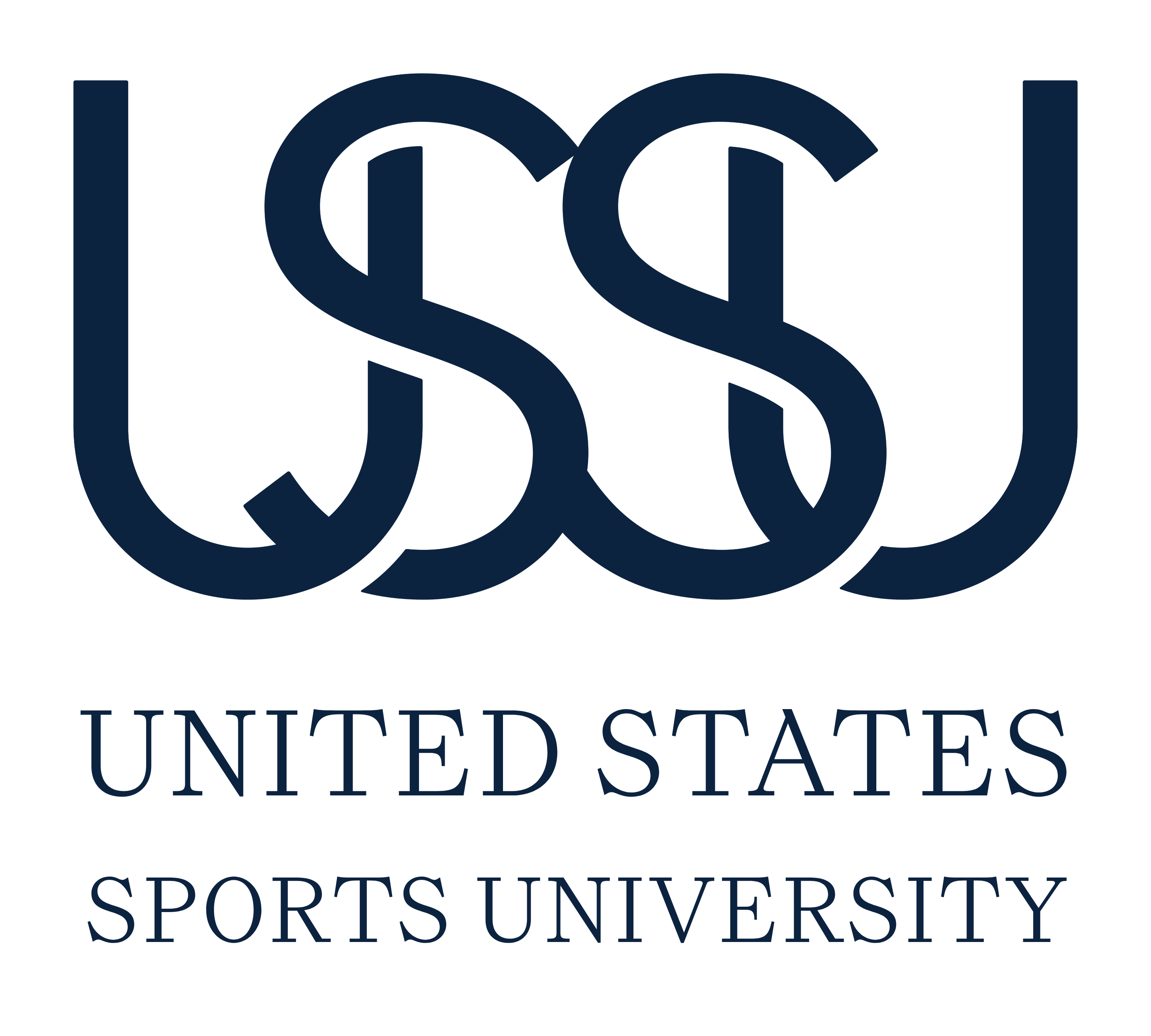
- Former name: United States Sports Academy (1972–2025)
- Motto: Et Aurum Vexillum
- Motto in English: The Gold Standard
- Type: Private university
- Established: 1972
- Academic affiliations: NAICU
- President: Dr. Steve Condon
- Students: 450
- Location: 1 Academy Drive, Daphne, AL 36526, United States
- Nicknames: Eagles, America's Sports University
- Sporting affiliations: NAIA – Continental
- Mascot: Sammy the Eagle
- Website: www.ussu.edu

The United States Sports University is a private university focused on sports and located in Daphne, Alabama. It offers bachelor's, master's, and doctoral degree programs as well as certificate programs. Founded in 1972, the academy has provided its sports programs to more than 60 countries around the world.

== History ==
Thomas P. Rosandich founded the academy in 1972.

Steve Condon was named the third President and CEO of the United States Sports University in late 2022.

The academy's campus is home to the American Sport Art Museum and Archives (ASAMA), which was founded in 1984. The collection contains more than 1,000 works of sport art. The academy hosts the Awards of Sport series, also known as its tribute to "The Artist and the Athlete".

On February 26, 2025, the Board of Trustees agreed to change the name of the academy to the United States Sports University. School officials stated that the name change reflects their dedication to academic excellence and their desire to establish their place in higher education.

== Athletics ==
In 2024, the United States Sport University (then USSA) launched intercollegiate athletics.

On June 11, 2024, The university announced it's acceptance into the United States Collegiate Athletic Association (USCAA). USSU was granted provisional membership for the 2024–25 academic year, and received eligibility for All-American awards and post-season play in the 2025–26 academic year.

On April 13, 2026, the United States Sports University announced it's acceptance into the National Association of Intercollegiate Athletics (NAIA) as a full member, effective July 1, 2026. The Eagles will join the Continental Athletic Conference in 2026–27 and plans to enter the Southern States Athletic Conference in 2027–28.

== Amos Alonzo Stagg Coaching Award ==
The Amos Alonzo Stagg Coaching Award is presented each year, for the preceding calendar year. It was first presented in 1985, for the 1984 sports year. Each recipient receives the USSA's Order of the Eagle Exemplar medal and Academy Rosette.

== Carl Maddox Sport Management Award ==
The Carl Maddox Sport Management Award is presented each year. It was first presented in 1991.

== Notable alumni ==
- Aimee Buchanan, American-born Olympic figure skater for Israel
- Vicky Bullett, professional basketball player and coach, 1988 Olympic gold medalist
- Marco Cardinale, Italian sports scientist
- Mark Chay, Singaporean Olympic swimmer, sports executive and Nominated Member of the Parliament of Singapore
- Ed Comeau, Canadian lacrosse coach
- Lynn Conkwright, professional bodybuilder
- Steve Hawkins, college basketball coach
- Marcus Hilliard, college football coach
- Quentin Hillsman, college basketball coach
- Tony Hobson, college basketball coach
- Mike Leach, college football coach
- Dennis Lindsey, professional basketball executive
- Chad Lunsford, college football coach
- Noemi Lung Zaharia, Romanian swimmer, 1988 Olympic silver medalist
- Scott Maxfield, college football coach
- Ernie McCook, college football coach
- Greg McDermott, college basketball coach
- Michael Nakazawa, Japanese professional wrestler
- Conor O'Shea, Irish rugby union player and coach
- LaTanya Sheffield, Olympic hurdler
- Jessie Tompkins, track and field athlete
- Frank Turner, college football coach
