= Kiski Area High School =

Location
- 240 Hyde Park Road; Leechburg, Pennsylvania 15656; United States; 40.6013°N 79.6047°W

Information
- Type: Public
- Motto: Learning has no boundaries: Every child. Every classroom. Every day.
- Established: 1962
- School district: Kiski Area School District
- Superintendent: Jason Lohr
- Principal: Matthew Smith
- Staff: 52.25 (FTE)
- Grades: 9-12
- Enrollment: 1,086 (2023-2024)
- Student to teacher ratio: 20.78
- Colors: Navy and gold
- Athletics conference: WPIAL 5A Section 2
- Team name: Cavaliers
- Assistant Principals: Braden Hoffer, Alicia Szarek
- Athletic Director: Jake Nulph
- Website: School website

Kiski Area High School is a public high school in Leechburg, Pennsylvania. Kiski Area is the only high school in the Kiski Area School District which serves eight municipalities in Westmoreland County and one municipality in Armstrong County.

== History ==
Kiski Area High School was established in 1962.

== Athletics ==
The following sports are offered at Kiski:

- Baseball
- Basketball
- Bowling
- Cross country
- Football
- Golf
- Ice hockey
- Soccer
- Softball
- Swimming
- Tennis
- Track and field
- Volleyball
- Wrestling

== Cold War ==
The school had a Nuclear Fallout Shelter at its B Gym on the opposite side of the tennis courts.
