= Jason Rejfek =

American football coach (born c. 1990)

Current position
- Title: Head coach
- Team: McKendree
- Conference: GLVC
- Record: 9–13

Biographical details
- Born: c. 1990 (age 35–36)
- Education: McKendree College (2012)

Playing career
- 2008–2011: McKendree
- Position: Linebacker

Coaching career (HC unless noted)
- 2012: Point (LB)
- 2013: Point (DC/DB)
- 2014: Point (DC/LB)
- 2015: Lindenwood–Belleville (DB)
- 2016: Lindenwood–Belleville (DL)
- 2017: Lindenwood–Belleville (WR)
- 2018: McKendree (WR)
- 2019–2023: McKendree (DC/DB)
- 2024–present: McKendree

Head coaching record
- Overall: 9–13

Accomplishments and honors

Awards
- All-MSFA (2010)

Jason Rejfek (born c. 1990) is an American college football coach. He is the head football coach for McKendree University, a position he has held since 2024. He also coached for Point and Lindenwood–Belleville. He played college football for McKendree as a linebacker where he earned all Mid-States Football Association (MSFA) honors in his junior year.

== Head coaching record ==
Year	Team	Overall	Conference	Standing	Bowl/playoffs
McKendree Bearcats (Great Lakes Valley Conference) (2024–present)
2024	McKendree	5–6	4–4	5th	
2025	McKendree	4–7	4–4	T–4th	
McKendree:		9–13	8–8		
Total:		9–13			
