= Angelo State Rams football =

2024 Angelo State Rams football team
- First season: 1964; 62 years ago
- Athletic director: James Reid
- Head coach: Jeff Girsch; 5th season, 50–15 (.769)
- Location: San Angelo, Texas
- Stadium: LeGrand Sports Complex (capacity: 5,500)
- NCAA division: Division II
- Conference: Lone Star Conference
- Colors: Blue and gold
- All-time record: 324–250–5 (.564)

NAIA national championships
- NAIA Division I: 1978

Conference championships
- LSC: 1978, 1984, 1987, 2014, 2022, 2024
- Consensus All-Americans: 54
- Rivalries: Abilene Christian; Tarleton State; Texas A&M–Kingsville; West Texas A&M
- Fight song: Angelo State Fight Song
- Mascot: Roscoe the Ram
- Marching band: Ram Marching Band
- Website: angelosports.com

The Angelo State Rams football team represents Angelo State University in NCAA Division II college football. The Rams compete in the South Division of the Lone Star Conference. Angelo State has earned one national championship, winning the NAIA Division I title in 1978. The team plays all home games at LeGrand Stadium at 1st Community Credit Union Field. Jeff Girsch is currently the head coach.

== Head coaches ==
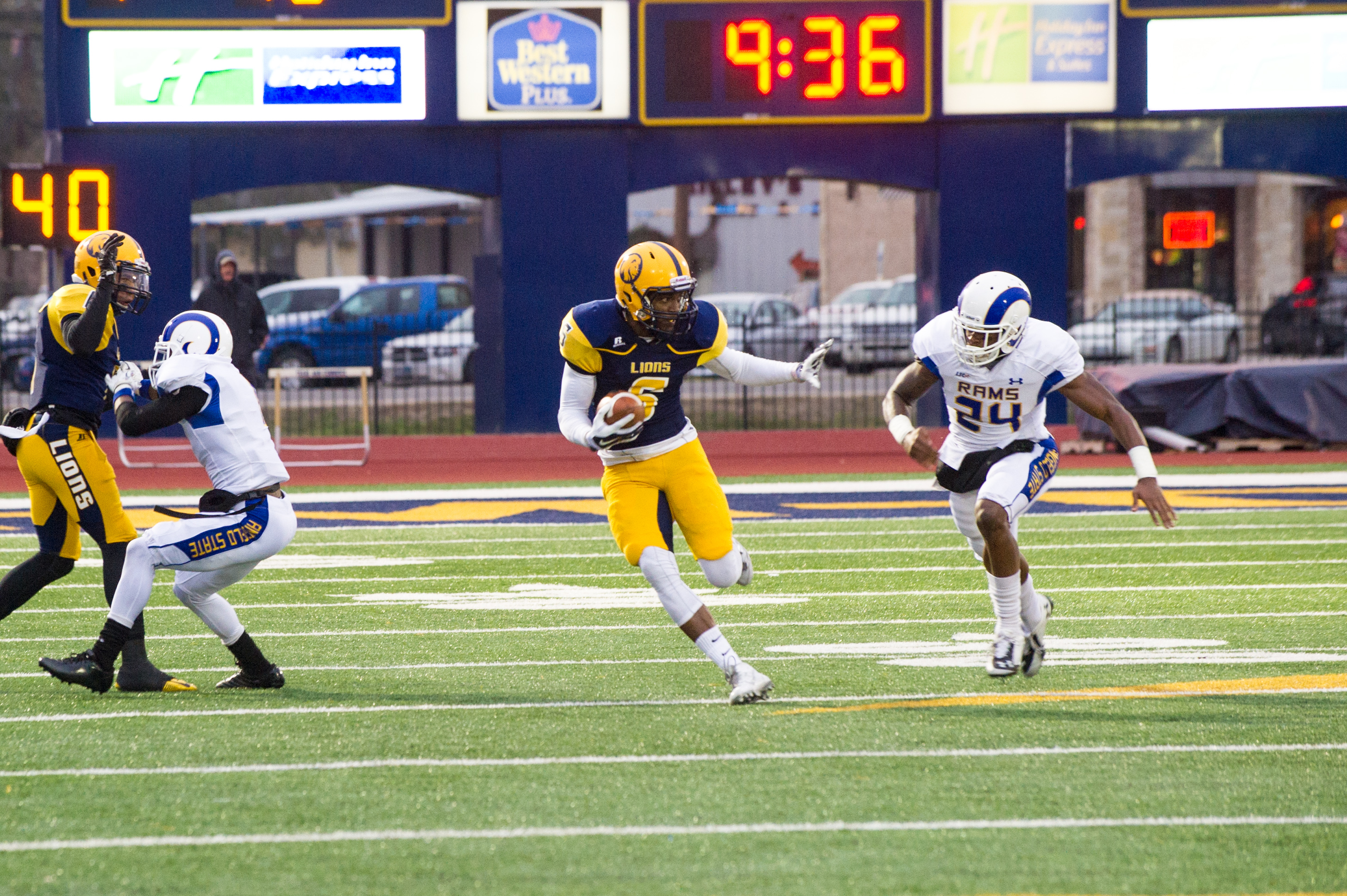
The Rams in action against the Texas A&M–Commerce Lions in 2014

Coach	Years	Record	Percentage
Max Bumgardner	1964–1968	13–36	.265
Grant Teaff	1969–1971	19–11	.633
James Cameron	1972–1973	13–7	.650
Jim Hess	1973–1981	65–23–3	.731
Jerry Vandergriff	1982–2004	143–101–2	.585
Dale Carr	2005–2010	28–36	.438
Will Wagner	2011–2018	48–41	.539
Jeff Girsch	2019–present	50–15	.769

== Championships ==
=== National championships ===
Year	Association	Division	Head coach	Record	Opponent	Result
1978	NAIA (1)	Division I (1)	Jim Hess	14–0 (7–0 LSC)	Elon	W, 34–14

== Playoff appearances ==
=== NCAA Division II ===
The Rams have made nine appearances in the NCAA Division II playoffs. Their combined record is 7–9.

Year	Round	Opponent	Result
1987	Quarterfinals	Northern Michigan	L, 20–23 ^{OT}
1989	First Round; Quarterfinals; Semifinals	UC Davis; Pittsburg State; Jacksonville State	W, 28–23; W, 24–21; L, 16–34
1994	First Round	Portland State	L, 0–29
1997	First Round; Quarterfinals	Western State (CO); UC Davis	W, 46–20; L, 33–50
2005	First Round	Northwest Missouri State	L, 14–45
2014	First Round; Second Round	Michigan Tech; CSU Pueblo	W, 42–41; L, 14–52
2021	First Round; Second Round; Regional Finals	Minnesota–Duluth; Nebraska–Kearney; Colorado Mines	W, 48–14; W, 20–7; L, 26–34
2022	Second Round; Regional Finals	Bemidji State; Colorado Mines	W, 33–7; L, 24–42
2024	First Round	Bemidji State	L, 14–24

=== NAIA ===
The Rams made three appearances in the NAIA playoffs. Their combined record was 4–2, with a national championship in 1978.

Year	Round	Opponent	Result
1978	Quarterfinals; Semifinals; National Championship	Oregon College; Western State (CO); Elon	W, 32–0; W, 35–3; W, 24–14
1979	Quarterfinals; Semifinals	Wisconsin–River Falls; Texas A&I	W, 31–7; L, 19–22
1980	Quarterfinals	Northeastern State (OK)	L, 3–10

== Rams who have played in the NFL ==
- Jerry Aldridge
- Chris Brazzell
- Rod Cason
- Bob Clatterbuck
- Shockmain Davis
- Alvin Garrett
- Shawn Hollingsworth
- Pierce Holt
- Ken Kennard
- Dane Krager
- Andre President
- Wylie Turner
- Clayton Weishuhn
- Charlie West
