= James Cameron (American football) =

American football coach (1938–1995)

Biographical details
- Born: September 11, 1938; Commerce, Texas, U.S.
- Died: April 1, 1995 (aged 56); Texas, U.S.

Coaching career (HC unless noted)
- 1968–1971: Howard Payne
- 1972–1973: Angelo State

Head coaching record
- Overall: 34–28–4 (college)
- Bowls: 1–1

Accomplishments and honors

Championships
- 1 LSC (1971)

Awards
- LSC Coach of the Year (1971)

James Robert Cameron (September 11, 1938 – April 1, 1995) was an American football coach. He served as the head football coach at Howard Payne University from 1968 to 1971 and Angelo State University from 1972 to 1973, compiling a career college football coaching record of 34–27–4.

Cameron was born on September 11, 1938, to Noah and Kate Cameron. He attended Commerce High School in Commerce, Texas, where he played basketball and football. He married his high school sweetheart, June Duncan. After he graduated from college at East Texas State University, Cameron coached high school football in McKinney, Sulphur Springs, Kilgore, Rockwall, Garland, and Waco. He had four children (Debra, Jeff, Joey, and Jessica) with his wife June. His last coaching position was head football coach and athletic director at Sulphur Springs High School. He died on April 1, 1995, of a heart attack at his residential home in Sulphur Springs. His final record was 208–79–13. His coaching record at Howard Payne was 21–20–2.

== Head coaching record ==
=== College ===
Year	Team	Overall	Conference	Standing	Bowl/playoffs
Howard Payne Yellow Jackets (Lone Star Conference) (1968–1971)
1968	Howard Payne	2–7–1	1–5–1	7th	
1969	Howard Payne	4–7	2–5	7th	
1970	Howard Payne	5–5	4–5	T–5th	
1971	Howard Payne	10–1–1	7–1–1	T–1st	W Cowboy Bowl
Howard Payne:		21–20–2			
Angelo State Rams (Lone Star Conference) (1972–1973)
1972	Angelo State	8–3	6–2	T–2nd	L Shrine Bowl
1973	Angelo State	5–4–2	5–4	5th	
Angelo State:		13–7–2	11–6		
Total:		34–28–4			
National championship Conference title Conference division title or championship game berth
