= Marcus Hilliard =

American football coach (born c. 1980)

Current position
- Title: Defensive coordinator
- Team: Albany State
- Conference: SIAC

Biographical details
- Born: c. 1980 (age 45–46); Goldsboro, North Carolina, U.S.
- Education: Elizabeth City State University (2004); United States Sports Academy (2007)

Playing career
- 1999–2002: Elizabeth City State
- Position: Linebacker

Coaching career (HC unless noted)
- 2003: Elizabeth City State (GA)
- 2004–2005: Elizabeth City State (LB)
- 2006–2009: Elizabeth City State (DL)
- 2010–2017: Elizabeth City State (DC)
- 2018–2021: Virginia Union (co-DC/DL)
- 2022–2024: Elizabeth City State
- 2025–2025: Barton (assoc. HC/DL)
- 2025-Present: Albany State (DC)

Head coaching record
- Overall: 8–22

Accomplishments and honors

Awards
- As player: First Team All-CIAA (2001); As coach: Division II Assistant Coach of the Year (2018)

Marcus A. Hilliard (born c. 1980) is an American college football coach. He is currently the defensive coordinator for the Albany State Golden Rams since 2025. He was the associate head football coach and defensive line coach for Barton College. He was also the head football coach for Elizabeth City State University from 2022 to 2024. He also coached for Virginia Union. He played college football for Elizabeth City State as a linebacker.

== Head coaching record ==
Year	Team	Overall	Conference	Standing	Bowl/playoffs
Elizabeth City State Vikings (Central Intercollegiate Athletic Association) (2022–2024)
2022	Elizabeth City State	2–8	2–6	5th (Northern)	
2023	Elizabeth City State	3–7	2–6	5th (Northern)	
2024	Elizabeth City State	3–7	1–6		
Elizabeth City State:		8–22	5–18		
Total:		8–22			
