= Jake Nulph =

American football coach (born c. 1982)

Current position
- Title: Athletic director
- Team: Kiski Area HS (PA)

Biographical details
- Born: c. 1982 (age 43–44); Spring Church, Pennsylvania, U.S.
- Education: Robert Morris University (2005, 2007)

Playing career
- 2001: Grove City
- 2002–2004: Robert Morris
- Positions: Quarterback, defensive back

Coaching career (HC unless noted)
- 2005–2006: Robert Morris (RB)
- 2007: Robert Morris (QB)
- 2008: Robert Morris (ST/S)
- 2009: Allegheny (ST/DB)
- 2010: Saint Francis (ST/LB)
- 2011: Saint Francis (DC)
- 2012–2013: Saint Francis (co-DC)
- 2014–2017: Westminster (PA) (DC/ST)
- 2018: Duquesne (ST/DB)
- 2019: IUP (ST/DB)
- 2020–2024: Edinboro

Administrative career (AD unless noted)
- 2025–present: Kiski Area HS (PA)

Head coaching record
- Overall: 14–28

Jake Nulph (born c. 1982) is an American athletic director and former college football coach. He is the athletic director for Kiski Area High School, a position he has held since 2025. He was the head football coach for PennWest Edinboro from 2020 to 2024. He previously coached for Robert Morris, Allegheny, Saint Francis, Westminster, Duquesne, and IUP. He played college football for Grove City and Robert Morris as a quarterback and defensive back.

== Head coaching record ==
Year	Team	Overall	Conference	Standing	Bowl/playoffs
Edinboro Fighting Scots (Pennsylvania State Athletic Conference) (2020–2024)
2020–21	No team—COVID-19				
2021	Edinboro	4–6	3–4	T–4th (West)	
2022	Edinboro	5–6	2–5	T–5th (West)	
2023	Edinboro	2–8	1–6	T–6th (West)	
2024	Edinboro	3–8	2–4	5th (West)	
Edinboro:		14–28	8–19		
Total:		14–28			
