= Angelo State University Management Instruction and Research Center =

Agricultural research and education facility in Texas

Coordinates: 31°32′39.2″N 100°30′45.5″W

Management Instruction and Research Center
- Established: 1975
- Academic staff: 12
- Postgraduates: 21
- Location: San Angelo, Texas, U.S.
- Website: https://web.archive.org/20090212211332/http://angelo.edu:80/dept/agriculture/research.html

The Angelo State University Management Instruction and Research center was founded in 1975. It is an Agriculture Research Center that concentrates primarily on areas of research involving sheep, goat, and cattle production; range management and improvement, and wildlife management. The center resides on over 6,000 acres (24 km^{2}) of land under long-term lease from the U.S. Army Corps of Engineers. It is located on the shores of O.C. Fisher Lake outside San Angelo, Texas. The research center serves as a full-sized working ranch, one of few among U.S. universities. It includes 150 Rambouillet sheep (the university mascot), 100 Suffolk and hair sheep, 95 Boer goats, 50 Angora goats, and over 100 Angus cattle. Departments within the MIR include the $1.6 million, 8,000-square-foot (743 m^{2}) Food Safety and Product Development Laboratory facility opened in 2005 and the associated ASU Meat Market.

== Research ==
Recent published research conducted by the faculty at Angelo State University MIR include:

Salisbury, Michael W., May, B. J., Talley, S. J., Carr, M. A., & Engdahl, G. R. (2007). Feedlot Performance and Carcass Characteristics of Feeder Lambs Implanted and Re-implanted with Zeronol. Texas Journal of Agriculture and Natural Resources, 10, 1-9.

Sluiter, R. S., May, B. J., Salisbury, M. W., Scott, C. B., Engdahl, G. R., & Craddock, B. F. (2007). Feedlot Performance and Carcass Traits of Texas Rambouillet Feeder Lambs Implanted With Growth Implants. Texas Journal of Agriculture and Natural Resources, 20, 22-27.

Yates, D. T., Salisbury, M. W., & Anderson, H. (2007). Effects of Supplementation of Tascoex on Infertility in Young Male Goats Experiencing Heat Stress. Journal of Animal Science, 85, 171, Supplement 2.

Dunbar, N. A., May, B. J., Salisbury, M. W., Scott, C. B., & Schafer, M. T. (2007). Effect of Copper Supplementation on Artificial Insemination Conception Rate of Angus Cows and Feedlot Performance of Angus Bulls. Journal of Animal Science, 85, 173, Supplement 2.

Mendoza, N., May, B. J., Salisbury, M. W., Engdahl, G. R., & Hilton, G. G. (2007). The Effect of Protein Level on Feedlot Performance and Carcass Characteristics of Texas Rambouillet Ewes. Journal of Animal Science, 85, 173, Supplement 2.
