= Quintin Hunter =

American football coach (born 1991)

Current position
- Title: Head coach
- Team: Emory & Henry
- Conference: SAC
- Record: 17–5

Biographical details
- Born: July 5, 1991 (age 35); Orange, Virginia, U.S.
- Education: James Madison University (2013)

Playing career
- 2009: Virginia
- 2010–2013: James Madison
- Position: Wide receiver

Coaching career (HC unless noted)
- 2014–2016: Emory & Henry (RB)
- 2017–2018: Emory & Henry (OC/QB)
- 2019–2021: Virginia–Wise (WR)
- 2022–2023: Emory & Henry (OC/WR)
- 2024: Emory & Henry (interim HC / OC)
- 2025–present: Emory & Henry

Head coaching record
- Overall: 17–5

Quintin Erwin Hunter (born July 5, 1991) is an American college football coach. He is the head football coach for Emory & Henry University, a position he has held since 2024. He previously coached for Virginia–Wise. He played college football for Virginia and James Madison as a wide receiver.

== Head coaching record ==
Year	Team	Overall	Conference	Standing	Bowl/playoffs
Emory & Henry Wasps (South Atlantic Conference) (2024–present)
2024	Emory & Henry	9–2	6–2	2nd (Mountain)	
2025	Emory & Henry	8–3	6–3	T–3rd	
2026	Emory & Henry	0–0	0–0		
Emory & Henry:		17–5	12–5		
Total:		17–5			
