= 2024 NCAA Division II football season =

American college football season

- Total No. of teams: 162
- Regular season: August 29 – November 16, 2024
- Playoffs: November 23 – December 21, 2024
- National Championship: McKinney Independent School District Stadium; McKinney, TX; December 21, 2024
- Champion: Ferris State
- Harlon Hill Trophy: Zach Zebrowski, QB, Central Missouri

The 2024 NCAA Division II football season, part of college football in the United States organized by the National Collegiate Athletic Association (NCAA) at the Division II level, began on August 29 and ended on December 21 with the Division II championship at the McKinney Independent School District Stadium in McKinney, Texas. Ferris State won the title, defeating Valdosta State, 49–14.

== D-II team wins over FCS teams ==
August 29: Sioux Falls 34, St. Thomas (MN) 13
September 7: Edinboro 23, Robert Morris 21
September 21: Clark Atlanta 38, Bethune–Cookman 37
September 28: Frostburg State 25, Mercyhurst 24

== Conference changes and new programs ==
School	Former conference	New conference	Ref
Anderson (SC) Trojans	New program	SAC	
Erskine Flying Fleet	SAC	Gulf South	
Lincoln (MO) Blue Tigers	Independent (D-II)	GLVC	
Mercyhurst Lakers	PSAC	Northeast (FCS)	
Northeastern State RiverHawks	MIAA	Independent (D-II)	
Notre Dame (OH) Falcons	Mountain East	School closed	
Post Eagles	Independent (D-II)	NE-10	
Roosevelt Lakers	Mid-States (NAIA)	GLIAC	
Shorter Hawks	Gulf South	Independent (D-II)	
St. Augustine's Falcons	CIAA	Program suspended	
Sul Ross Lobos	ASC (D-III)	Lone Star	
West Georgia Wolves	Gulf South	UAC (FCS)	

== Headlines ==
- January 13 - At the 2024 NCAA Convention, the D-II football membership approved a proposal to add a "Week Zero", allowing schools to play one week earlier than in previous seasons and extending the regular season from 11 weeks to 12. The maximum number of regular-season games remained at 11.

== Rankings ==
The top 25 from the AFCA Coaches' Poll.

=== Preseason Poll ===
AFCA
Ranking	Team
1	Harding (25)
2	Central Missouri
3	Ferris State (1)
4	Grand Valley State (1)
5	Colorado Mines
6	Pittsburg State
7	Valdosta State
8	Central Washington
9	Lenoir-Rhyne
10	Kutztown
11	Slippery Rock
12	West Florida
13	Minnesota State
14	Augustana
15	Western Colorado
16	Indianapolis
17	Minnesota–Duluth
18	Delta State
19	Ouachita Baptist
20	Virginia Union
21	UT Permian Basin
22	Northwest Missouri State
23	Charleston
24	Angelo State
25	Bemidji State

== Conference standings ==
=== Super Region 1 ===
2024 Great Midwest Athletic Conference football standings
	Conf.			Overall
Team	W		L	W		L
No. 23 Ashland $^	8	–	1	9	–	4
Findlay	7	–	2	9	–	2
Tiffin #	7	–	2	8	–	4
Hillsdale	6	–	3	6	–	5
Northwood	4	–	5	6	–	5
Thomas More *	4	–	5	5	–	6
Walsh	4	–	5	5	–	6
Ohio Dominican	3	–	6	4	–	7
Lake Erie	1	–	8	2	–	9
Kentucky Wesleyan	1	–	8	2	–	9
$ – Conference champion; ^ – NCAA Division II playoff participant; # – America's Crossroads Bowl participant * – Thomas More ineligible for postseason play due to transition from NAIA; Rankings from AFCA poll

2024 Mountain East Conference football standings
	Conf.			Overall
Team	W		L	W		L
No. 15 Charleston (WV) $^	9	–	0	11	–	1
Glenville State	7	–	2	7	–	4
Fairmont State	6	–	3	7	–	4
UNC Pembroke	6	–	3	6	–	5
Wheeling	5	–	4	6	–	5
West Virginia State	5	–	4	6	–	5
Frostburg State	4	–	5	6	–	5
West Liberty	2	–	7	2	–	9
Concord	1	–	8	1	–	10
West Virginia Wesleyan	0	–	9	0	–	11
$ – Conference champion; ^ – NCAA Division II playoff participant; Rankings from AFCA poll

2024 Northeast-10 Conference football standings
	Conf.			Overall
Team	W		L	W		L
New Haven $^	7	–	1	8	–	3
Bentley	6	–	2	8	–	2
Assumption	5	–	3	6	–	4
Franklin Pierce	5	–	3	5	–	5
Saint Anselm	5	–	3	5	–	5
Southern Connecticut	3	–	5	4	–	6
American International	3	–	5	4	–	7
Pace	2	–	6	2	–	8
Post	0	–	8	1	–	9
$ – Conference champion; ^ – NCAA Division II playoff participant; Rankings from AFCA poll

2024 Pennsylvania State Athletic Conference football standings
	Conf.			Overall
Team	W		L	W		L
East Division
No. 5 Kutztown xy$^	7	–	0	11	–	1
East Stroudsburg ^	6	–	1	10	–	2
Bloomsburg	4	–	3	6	–	5
West Chester	4	–	3	4	–	6
Shepherd	3	–	4	6	–	5
Lock Haven	3	–	4	5	–	6
Shippensburg	1	–	6	2	–	9
Millersville	0	–	7	1	–	10
West Division
No. 12 California (PA) xy^	6	–	0	10	–	3
No. 3 Slippery Rock ^	5	–	1	12	–	2
IUP	3	–	3	7	–	3
Gannon	3	–	3	3	–	7
Edinboro	2	–	4	3	–	8
Clarion	1	–	5	3	–	8
Seton Hill	1	–	5	3	–	8
Championship: Kutztown 21, California (PA) 14
$ – Conference champion; x – Division champion/co-champions; y – Championship game participant; ^ – NCAA Division II playoff participant; Rankings from AFCA poll

=== Super Region 2 ===
2024 Central Intercollegiate Athletic Association football standings
	Conf.			Overall
Team	W		L	W		L
No. 11 Virginia Union y$^	6	–	1	10	–	4
Virginia State y	6	–	1	7	–	4
Johnson C. Smith	5	–	2	8	–	2
Winston-Salem State	5	–	2	7	–	3
Livingstone	4	–	3	6	–	4
Shaw	4	–	3	6	–	4
Fayetteville State	3	–	4	4	–	5
Bowie State	3	–	4	4	–	6
Lincoln (PA)	2	–	5	2	–	8
Elizabeth City State	1	–	6	3	–	7
Bluefield State	0	–	7	1	–	9
Championship: Virginia Union 17, Virginia State 13
$ – Conference champion; y – Championship game participant; ^ – NCAA Division II playoff participant; Rankings from AFCA poll

2024 Gulf South Conference football standings
	Conf.			Overall
Team	W		L	W		L
No. 2 Valdosta State $^	6	–	0	13	–	1
No. 18 West Alabama ^	5	–	1	9	–	2
West Florida	5	–	2	7	–	3
North Greenville	4	–	3	6	–	5
Delta State	3	–	3	6	–	4
Chowan	2	–	5	3	–	7
Mississippi College	1	–	6	2	–	8
Erskine	0	–	6	1	–	8
$ – Conference champion; ^ – NCAA Division II playoff participant; Rankings from AFCA poll

2024 South Atlantic Conference football standings
	Conf.			Overall
Team	W		L	W		L
Mountain Division
Carson–Newman xy^	7	–	1	9	–	3
Emory & Henry	6	–	2	9	–	2
Mars Hill	5	–	2	5	–	4
UVA Wise	2	–	5	4	–	6
Anderson (SC)	1	–	7	3	–	8
Tusculum	1	–	7	1	–	9
Piedmont Division
No. 21 Wingate xy$^	6	–	1	9	–	2
No. 16 Lenoir–Rhyne ^	6	–	2	10	–	3
Limestone	6	–	2	8	–	3
Newberry	3	–	4	3	–	7
Barton	2	–	6	3	–	8
Catawba	1	–	7	3	–	8
Championship: Wingate 28, Carson–Newman 13
$ – Conference champion; x – Division champion/co-champions; y – Championship game participant; ^ – NCAA Division II playoff participant; Rankings from AFCA poll

2024 Southern Intercollegiate Athletic Conference football standings
	Conf.					Overall
Team	W		L		T	W		L		T
No. 22 Miles y$^	8	–	0	–	0	10	–	3	–	0s
Clark Atlanta y	6	–	2	–	0	7	–	3	–	1
Fort Valley State	6	–	2	–	0	6	–	4	–	0
Albany State	6	–	2	–	0	6	–	4	–	0
Tuskegee	5	–	3	–	0	5	–	6	–	0
Savannah State	4	–	4	–	0	5	–	5	–	0
Kentucky State	4	–	4	–	0	5	–	6	–	0
Benedict	4	–	4	–	0	4	–	6	–	0
Lane	3	–	5	–	0	4	–	6	–	0
Edward Waters	3	–	5	–	0	3	–	7	–	0
Allen	1	–	7	–	0	2	–	8	–	0
Morehouse	1	–	7	–	0	1	–	9	–	0
Central State (OH)	1	–	7	–	0	1	–	9	–	0
Championship: Miles 53, Clark Atlanta 25
$ – Conference champion; y – Championship game participant; ^ – NCAA Division II playoff participant; Rankings from AFCA poll

2024 NCAA Division II Super Region 2 independents football records
	Conf.			Overall
Team	W		L	W		L
Shorter		–		3	–	7

=== Super Region 3 ===
2024 Great American Conference football standings
	Conf.			Overall
Team	W		L	W		L
No. 4 Harding +^	10	–	1	12	–	2
No. 14 Ouachita Baptist +^	10	–	1	10	–	2
Southern Arkansas	9	–	2	9	–	2
Henderson State	8	–	3	8	–	3
Arkansas Tech	5	–	6	5	–	6
East Central	5	–	6	5	–	6
SE Oklahoma State	5	–	6	5	–	6
Arkansas–Monticello	4	–	7	4	–	7
Southern Nazarene	3	–	8	3	–	8
SW Oklahoma State	3	–	8	3	–	8
NW Oklahoma State	2	–	9	2	–	9
Oklahoma Baptist	2	–	9	2	–	9
+ – Conference co-champions; ^ – NCAA Division II playoff participant; Rankings from AFCA poll

2024 Great Lakes Intercollegiate Athletic Conference football standings
	Conf.			Overall
Team	W		L	W		L
No. 1 Ferris State $^	7	–	0	14	–	1
No. 6 Grand Valley State ^	6	–	1	11	–	2
Davenport	4	–	3	7	–	4
Michigan Tech	4	–	3	7	–	4
Saginaw Valley State	4	–	3	7	–	4
Wayne State (MI)	2	–	5	2	–	9
Roosevelt*	1	–	6	1	–	9
Northern Michigan	0	–	7	0	–	11
$ – Conference champion; ^ – NCAA Division II playoff participant; * – Roosevelt ineligible for postseason play due to transition from NAIA; Rankings from AFCA poll

2024 Great Lakes Valley Conference football standings
	Conf.			Overall
Team	W		L	W		L
No. 19 Indianapolis $^	8	–	0	10	–	2
Truman State #	6	–	2	8	–	4
Upper Iowa	6	–	2	7	–	4
Quincy	5	–	3	5	–	4
McKendree	4	–	4	5	–	6
Missouri S&T	3	–	5	4	–	7
William Jewell	3	–	5	5	–	6
Southwest Baptist	1	–	7	2	–	8
Lincoln (MO)	0	–	8	1	–	10
$ – Conference champion; ^ – NCAA Division II playoff participant; # – America's Crossroads Bowl participant; Rankings from AFCA poll

2024 Mid-America Intercollegiate Athletics Association football standings
	Conf.			Overall
Team	W		L	W		L
No. 9 Central Oklahoma $^	8	–	1	11	–	2
No. 17 Pittsburg State ^	7	–	2	8	–	3
Central Missouri #	6	–	3	9	–	3
Fort Hays State	6	–	3	8	–	3
Emporia State	5	–	4	7	–	4
NW Missouri State	5	–	4	6	–	5
Nebraska–Kearney	3	–	6	5	–	6
Washburn	2	–	7	3	–	8
Missouri Western	2	–	7	4	–	7
Missouri Southern	1	–	8	2	–	9
$ – Conference champion; ^ – NCAA Division II playoff participant; # – Heritage Bowl participant; Rankings from AFCA Poll

2024 NCAA Division II Super Region 3 independents football records
	Conf.			Overall
Team	W		L	W		L
Northeastern State		–		2	–	9

=== Super Region 4 ===
2024 Lone Star Conference football standings
	Conf.			Overall
Team	W		L	W		L
No. 20 Angelo State $^	9	–	0	9	–	3
No. 24 Central Washington ^	7	–	2	8	–	4
Texas A&M–Kingsville	6	–	3	7	–	4
UT Permian Basin #	6	–	3	7	–	5
Western Oregon	6	–	3	6	–	5
West Texas A&M	5	–	4	5	–	6
Midwestern State	3	–	6	4	–	7
Sul Ross*	2	–	7	3	–	8
Eastern New Mexico	1	–	8	3	–	8
Western New Mexico	0	–	9	2	–	9
$ – Conference champion; ^ – NCAA Division II playoff participant; # – Heritage Bowl participant * – Sul Ross ineligible for postseason play due to transition from NCAA Division III; Rankings from AFCA poll

2024 Northern Sun Intercollegiate Conference football standings
	Conf.			Overall
Team	W		L	W		L
No. 25 Augustana (SD) $^	8	–	2	8	–	4
No. 7 Minnesota State ^	7	–	3	11	–	4
Sioux Falls	7	–	3	8	–	3
No. 13 Bemidji State ^	7	–	3	10	–	4
Minnesota Duluth	6	–	4	7	–	4
Wayne State (NE)	6	–	4	7	–	4
MSU Moorhead	6	–	4	6	–	5
Northern State	6	–	4	6	–	5
Winona State	5	–	5	5	–	6
Minot State	4	–	6	5	–	6
Concordia–St. Paul	2	–	8	2	–	9
Mary	1	–	9	2	–	9
SW Minnesota State	0	–	10	0	–	11
$ – Conference champion; ^ – NCAA Division II playoff participant; Rankings from AFCA poll

2024 Rocky Mountain Athletic Conference football standings
	Conf.			Overall
Team	W		L	W		L
No. 8 CSU Pueblo $^	9	–	0	10	–	2
No. 10 Western Colorado ^	8	–	1	11	–	2
Colorado Mesa	6	–	3	7	–	4
Colorado Mines	6	–	3	8	–	3
Black Hills State	5	–	4	6	–	5
South Dakota Mines	5	–	4	6	–	5
Chadron State	2	–	7	3	–	8
Fort Lewis	2	–	7	3	–	8
New Mexico Highlands	2	–	7	2	–	9
Adams State	0	–	9	0	–	11
$ – Conference champion; ^ – NCAA Division II playoff participant; Rankings from AFCA poll

== Postseason ==
=== Qualifiers ===
Playoff teams
Super Region	School	Conference	Record	Appearance	Last bid
Super Region 1	Kutztown	PSAC	11–0	7th	2023
Super Region 1	Charleston (WV)	Mountain East	11–0	3rd	2023
Super Region 1	California (PA)	PSAC	8–2	8th	2017
Super Region 1	Slippery Rock	PSAC	9–1	12th	2023
Super Region 1	New Haven	Northeast-10	8–2	10th	2023
Super Region 1	East Stroudsburg	PSAC	10–1	6th	2023
Super Region 1	Ashland	G-MAC	8–3	9th	2022
Super Region 2	Valdosta State	Gulf South	10–0	20th	2023
Super Region 2	Wingate	SAC	9–1	6th	2022
Super Region 2	West Alabama	Gulf South	9–1	7th	2018
Super Region 2	Miles	SIAC	9–2	3rd	2019
Super Region 2	Carson–Newman	SAC	9–2	17th	2019
Super Region 2	Lenoir–Rhyne	SAC	9–2	8th	2023
Super Region 2	Virginia Union	CIAA	8–3	12th	2023
Super Region 3	Ferris State	GLIAC	10–1	15th	2023
Super Region 3	Grand Valley State	GLIAC	10–1	23rd	2023
Super Region 3	Pittsburg State	MIAA	8–2	21st	2023
Super Region 3	Central Oklahoma	MIAA	10–1	5th	2003
Super Region 3	Ouachita Baptist	GAC	10–1	6th	2022
Super Region 3	Harding	GAC	10–1	7th	2023
Super Region 3	Indianapolis	GLVC	10–1	9th	2023
Super Region 4	CSU Pueblo	RMAC	10–1	10th	2022
Super Region 4	Western Colorado	RMAC	10–1	6th	2023
Super Region 4	Angelo State	Lone Star	9–2	9th	2022
Super Region 4	Augustana (SD)	NSIC	8–3	8th	2023
Super Region 4	Minnesota State	NSIC	8–3	15th	2023
Super Region 4	Bemidji State	NSIC	8–3	4th	2023
Super Region 4	Central Washington	Lone Star	8–3	8th	2023

=== Bracket ===
* - Host team

==== Super Region 1 ====
First Round; November 23, 2024; Campus sites ESPN+
New Haven	7
4	Slippery Rock*	14
3	California (PA)*	30
East Stroudsburg	27
Ashland	40
2	Charleston (WV)*	38

Second Round; November 30, 2024; Campus sites ESPN+
1	Kutztown*	24
4	Slippery Rock (OT)	25
3	California (PA)*	34
Ashland	33

Quarterfinals; December 7, 2024; Campus sites ESPN+
4	Slippery Rock	31
3	California (PA)*	13

==== Super Region 2 ====
First Round; November 23, 2024; Campus sites ESPN+
Carson–Newman	13
4	Miles*	14
3	West Alabama*	34
Lenoir–Rhyne	37
Virginia Union (OT)	34
2	Wingate*	31

Second Round; November 30, 2024; Campus sites ESPN+
1	Valdosta State*	33
4	Miles	17
Lenoir–Rhyne*	12
Virginia Union	44

Quarterfinals; December 7, 2024; Campus sites ESPN+
1	Valdosta State*	49
Virginia Union	14

==== Super Region 3 ====
First Round; November 23, 2024; Campus sites ESPN+
Ouachita Baptist	31
4	Central Oklahoma* (OT)	38
3	Pittsburg State*	3
Harding	48
Indianapolis	7
2	Grand Valley State*	24

Second Round; November 30, 2024; Campus sites ESPN+
1	Ferris State*	78
4	Central Oklahoma	17
Harding	44
2	Grand Valley State*	26

Quarterfinals; December 7, 2024; Campus sites ESPN+
1	Ferris State*	41
Harding	7

==== Super Region 4 ====
First Round; November 23, 2024; Campus sites ESPN+
Minnesota State	20
4	Augustana (SD)*	19
3	Angelo State*	14
Bemidji State	24
Central Washington	21
2	Western Colorado*	28

Second Round; November 30, 2024; Campus sites ESPN+
1	CSU Pueblo*	23
Minnesota State	26
Bemidji State	20
2	Western Colorado*	19

Quarterfinals; December 7, 2024; Campus sites ESPN+
Minnesota State*	27
Bemidji State	23

=== Semifinals and championship ===
Teams were re-seeded prior to semifinals.

Semifinals; December 14, 2024; Hosted by higher seeded team USA: ESPN+ Canada: TSN+
1	Valdosta State	35
4	Minnesota State	21
3	Slippery Rock	38
2	Ferris State	48

Championship; December 21, 2024; McKinney ISD Stadium; McKinney, Texas; USA: ESPN2/ESPN+ Canada: TSN+
1	Valdosta State	14
2	Ferris State	49

=== Bowl games ===
Two bowl games were held which featured teams that did not qualify for the Division II postseason tournament. This is down from four bowl games in the previous season, as the Live United Texarkana Bowl went defunct and the Florida Beach Bowl was not held for 2024 due to funding issues. Additionally, a regular season conference game between North Greenville and Shorter was postponed due to Hurricane Helene; it was rescheduled for the first week of the Division II postseason, restructured as a quasi-bowl game and dubbed the "Helene Relief Bowl".

Date	Time (EST)	Game	Site	Television	Teams	Affiliations	Results
Dec 7	1:00 pm	Heritage Bowl	Tiger Stadium; Corsicana, Texas	Livestream	UT Permian Basin; Central Missouri	LSC; MIAA	Central Missouri 39; UT Permian Basin 37 (2OT)
Dec 7	2:00 pm	America's Crossroads Bowl	Hobart High School; Hobart, Indiana	Livestream	Truman; Tiffin	GLVC; GMAC	Truman 29; Tiffin 10

== All-America Team ==
The 2024 Division II College Football All-America Team is composed of the following College Football All-American first teams chosen by the following selector organizations: Associated Press (AP), American Football Coaches Association (AFCA), Conference Commissioner's Association (CCA) and Don Hansen (DH).

Key
Symbol	Meaning
**Bold**	Player was recognized by all selectors.

=== Offense ===
==== Quarterback ====
- **Zach Zebrowski**, Central Missouri (AFCA, AP, CCA, DH)
- Sammy Edwards, Valdosta State (AP-2, CCA-2, DH-2)
- Trinidad Chambliss, Ferris State (AFCA-2)

==== Running back ====
- **Jada Byers**, Virginia Union (AFCA, AP, CCA, DH)
- **Chavon Wright**, Charleston (AFCA, AP, CCA, DH)
- Ronald Blackman, Tiffin (AFCA-2, AP-2, CCA-2, DH-2)
- Shane Watts, Fort Hays State (AP-2, CCA-2, DH-2)
- L. J. Turner, Catawba (AFCA-2)

==== Wide receiver ====
- **Terrill Davis**, Central Oklahoma (AFCA, AP, CCA, DH)
- **Tyler Kahmann**, Emporia State (AFCA, AP, CCA, DH)
- Reggie Retzlaff, CSU Pueblo (AFCA, AP, DH, CCA-2)
- Max McLeod, Colorado Mines (AFCA-2, DH-2)
- Brice Peters, Bemidji State (AFCA-2, DH-2)
- Flynn Schiele, Colorado Mines (AP-2, CCA-2)
- Reginald Vick Jr., Virginia Union (AP-2, DH-2)
- Cam Abshire, Emory & Henry (AP-2)
- Jo Hayes, UNC Pembroke (AFCA-2)

==== Tight end ====
- Tre Williams, Limestone (CCA, DH-2)
- Cameron Woods, Northeastern State (DH, AP-2)
- Gabe Hagen, Minnesota State (AP)
- Sam Pitz, Minnesota Duluth (AFCA)
- Cayden Davis, Henderson State (CCA-2)
- Henry Dryden, South Dakota Mines (AFCA-2)

==== Offensive linemen ====
- **Gabe Brown**, Grand Valley State (AFCA, AP, CCA, DH)
- **Will Flowers**, Valdosta State (AFCA, AP, CCA, DH)
- Jaheim Bassham, California (AP, DH, AFCA-2, CCA-2)
- Jake Dugger, Harding (AFCA, CCA, AP-2, DH-2)
- Jake Gannon, Bemidji State (AP, DH, CCA-2)
- Lawrence Hattar, Ferris State (AFCA, DH)
- Nic Van de Graaf, Colorado Mines (AP, CCA)
- Montriel Lee, Central Oklahoma (AFCA, CCA-2, DH-2)
- Bryce George, Ferris State (CCA, AP-2)
- Jaelon Brown, Delta State (AP-2, DH-2)
- Yoseph Carter, Findlay (AFCA-2, DH-2)
- Gabe Clark, Central Missouri (AFCA-2, AP-2)
- Joe Cooper, Slippery Rock (AP-2, CCA-2)
- Marshall Foerner, Minnesota State (AFCA-2, DH-2)
- Donovan McCollister, Charleston (AFCA-2, CCA-2)

=== Defense ===
==== Defensive linemen ====
- **Marquise Fleming**, Wingate (AFCA, AP, CCA, DH)
- **Ricky Freymond**, Western Colorado (AFCA, AP, CCA, DH)
- Todd Hill, Slippery Rock, (AP, DH, CCA-2)
- Jamair Diaz, Glenville State (DH, AFCA-2, AP-2)
- Trevon Lambert, West Alabama (AFCA, DH-2)
- Gage Price, Harding (AP, AFCA-2)
- JaMichael Rogers, Miles (CCA, DH-2)
- Khris Walton, Tiffin (CCA, DH-2)
- Myles Menges, Fort Hays State (AFCA)
- Jake Fisher, Northwest Missouri State (AFCA-2, AP-2)
- Traevon Mitchell, West Florida (AP-2, DH-2)
- Isaac Anderson, Virginia Union (AP-2)
- Leonard Henry IV, Saginaw Valley State (CCA-2)
- Dawson Scott, Southern Arkansas (AFCA-2)

==== Linebacker ====
- **Benari Black**, Johnson C. Smith, (AFCA, AP, CCA, DH)
- Jake Adams, Northern State (CCA, DH, AP-2)
- Clay Schulte, Indianapolis (AFCA, CCA)
- Micah Gretsinger, Saginaw Valley State (DH, AFCA-2, CCA-2)
- Cam Hollobaugh, Walsh (AFCA, CCA-2, DH-2)
- Jack Puckett, Central Oklahoma (CCA)
- Wilfredo Diaz, Edinboro (AP-2, CCA-2, DH-2)
- Colin Stuhr, Colorado Mesa (AFCA-2, AP-2, CCA-2)
- Clark Griffin, Harding (AP-2, DH-2)
- Garrett Cox, IUP (AFCA-2)
- Eric Rascoe, Angelo State (AP-2)

==== Defensive back ====
- **Lashon Young**, Miles (AFCA, AP, CCA, DH)
- Larry Elder, Valdosta State (AFCA, AP, CCA-2, DH-2)
- Tanner Volk, Central Washington (CCA, DH, AFCA-2, AP-2)
- Andrew Pitts, Angelo State (AP, CCA)
- Devin Pringle, Grand Valley State (CCA, DH)
- Peyton Buckley, Augustana (South Dakota) (AP, AFCA-2, DH-2)
- Nic Cheeley, Lenoir–Rhyne (DH, CCA-2)
- Josiah Johnson, Ouachita Baptist (AFCA)
- Dion Kuinlan, Assumption (AFCA)
- Rashan Murray, California (AP-2, DH-2)
- Josh Stokes, Slippery Rock (AP-2, DH-2)
- Daniel Bone III, CSU Pueblo (AP-2)
- Ty Dugger, Harding (CCA-2)
- Cameren Grodhaus, Davenport (AFCA-2)
- Jaaron Joseph, Emporia State (CCA-2)
- Melvin Smith Jr., Southern Arkansas (AFCA-2)

=== Special Teams ===
==== Placekicker ====
- Anthony Beitko, California (AP, CCA, DH)
- Elijah Guyton, West Alabama (AFCA)
- Joseph Carlson, Midwestern State (AP-2, DH-2)
- Brandon Perez, East Central (AFCA-2, CCA-2)

==== Punter ====
- Blake Doud, Colorado Mines (AFCA, AP, CCA, DH-2)
- Brenden Lach, Michigan Tech (DH, AFCA-2, AP-2, CCA-2)

==== All-purpose / return specialist ====
- Trinidad Chambliss, Ferris State (AP, DH)
- DeJuan Bell, Fort Valley State (AFCA, DH-2)
- Kha'lil Eason, New Haven (CCA)
- Virgil Lemons, West Florida (AFCA-2)
- Drew Nash, Western Colorado (AP-2)
- Korey Stephens, Central Oklahoma (CCA-2)

== Coaching changes ==
=== Preseason and in-season ===
This is restricted to coaching changes that took place on or after May 1, 2024, and will include any changes announced after a team's last regularly scheduled games but before its playoff games.

School	Outgoing coach	Date	Reason	Replacement	Previous position
New Mexico Highlands	Ron Hudson	May 1, 2024	Fired	Kurt Taufa'asau	New Mexico Military head coach (2021–2023)
American International	Lou Conte	May 23, 2024	Hired as head coach by Westfield State	Daniel Chipka (full-season interim; named full-time on January 9, 2025)	American International offensive coordinator and quarterbacks coach (2023)
Henderson State	Scott Maxfield	June 26, 2024	Retired	Greg Holsworth	Henderson State assistant head coach and defensive coordinator (2017–2023)
Emory & Henry	Curt Newsome	July 30, 2024	Resigned	Quintin Hunter (interim; named full-time on November 11, 2024)	Emory & Henry offensive coordinator and wide receivers coach (2021–2023)
McKendree	Mike Babcock	August 6, 2024	Hired as assistant by UCLA	Jason Rejfek (interim; named full-time on November 19, 2024)	McKendree defensive coordinator and defensive backs coach (2019–2023)

=== End of season ===
This list includes coaching changes announced during the season that did not take effect until the end of the season.

School	Outgoing coach	Date	Reason	Replacement	Previous position
Elizabeth City State	Marcus Hilliard	November 14, 2024	Fired	Adrian Jones	Shaw head coach (2016–2024)
Lane	Vyron Brown	November 15, 2024	Resigned	Stanley Conner	Miles running backs coach (2016–2024)
Adams State	Jarrell Harrison	November 18, 2024	Resigned	Levi Gallas	West Texas A&M defensive coordinator and defensive line coach (2023–2024)
Concord	Brian Ferguson	November 18, 2024	Fired	Cody Edwards	Western Carolina special teams coordinator and linebackers coach (2024)
Washburn	Craig Schurig	November 18, 2024	Fired	Zach Watkins	Washburn co-defensive coordinator and defensive backs coach (2014–2024)
Northwest Missouri State	Rich Wright	November 19, 2024	Contract not renewed	John McMenamin	Tulane pass game coordinator and wide receivers coach (2022)
Texas A&M–Kingsville	Mike Salinas	November 19, 2024	Resigned (became school's athletic director)	Scott Parr	Louisiana Tech co-offensive coordinator and tight ends coach (2022–2024)
Arkansas Tech	Kyle Shipp	December 2, 2024	Resigned	Roy Thompson Jr.	Ouachita Baptist defensive coordinator and linebackers coach (2018–2024)
Sul Ross	Barry Derickson	December 2, 2024	Resigned	Lee Hays	Lubbock-Cooper HS (TX) offensive line coach (2018–2024)
Shaw	Adrian Jones	December 3, 2024	Fired	Lamar Manigo	Virginia State offensive coordinator and quarterbacks coach (2022–2024)
North Greenville	Jeff Farrington	December 4, 2024	Resigned	Nate Garner	Limestone offensive line coach (2022–2024)
Pace	Andy Rondeau	December 4, 2024	Fired	Chad Walker	Christ School (NC) head coach (2021–2024)
Fort Valley State	Shawn Gibbs	December 6, 2024	Hired as head coach by North Carolina A&T	Marlon Watson	Prairie View A&M special teams coordinator and defensive ends coach (2023–2024)
Edinboro	Jake Nulph	December 9, 2024	Resigned	Matthew Scott	New Haven defensive coordinator and defensive backs coach (2017–2024)
Bentley	Saj Thakkar	December 17, 2024	Hired as head coach by Davidson	CJ Scarpa	Bentley co-offensive coordinator and wide receivers coach (2023–2024)
Valdosta State	Tremaine Jackson	December 21, 2024	Hired as head coach by Prairie View A&M	Graham Craig	Valdosta State offensive coordinator (2024)
Miles	Sam Shade	December 29, 2024	Hired as head coach by Alabama A&M	Chris Goode	Birmingham Steeldogs defensive coordinator (2000–2004)
Central State (OH)	Kevin Porter	December 31, 2024	Contract not renewed	Tony Carter	Southeastern cornerbacks coach (2024)
Roosevelt	Jared Williamson	January 2, 2025	Hired as head coach by Illinois Wesleyan	Bill McKeon	Roosevelt defensive coordinator and defensive backs coach (2024)
Winona State	Brian Bergstrom	January 8, 2025	Hired as defensive coordinator by South Dakota State	Brian Curtin	Winona State special teams coordinator and wide receivers coach (2023–2024) (Note: Has served on the Winona State staff since 1997.)
Charleston (WV)	Quinn Sanders	January 10, 2025	Hired as offensive coordinator by Northern Illinois	Michael Tesch	Charleston (WV) offensive coordinator and wide receivers coach (2022–2024)
Lock Haven	Dan Mulrooney	January 11, 2025	Hired as defensive coordinator by Brown	Joe Battaglia	Lock Haven offensive coordinator and quarterbacks coach (2022–2024)
Colorado Mines	Pete Sterbick	January 21, 2025	Hired as offensive coordinator by Montana State	Bob Stitt	Valor Christian HS (CO) offensive coordinator (2024)
Southern Connecticut	Tom Godek	January 21, 2025	Fired	Joe Loth	Western Connecticut head coach (2012–2024)
West Alabama	Brett Gilliland	February 3, 2025	Resigned (became school's athletic director)	Scott Cochran	Georgia special teams coordinator (2020–2023)
Southwest Baptist	Robert Clardy	February 11, 2025	Hired as head coach by Bolivar HS (MO)	Paul Hansen	MidAmerica Nazarene head coach (2020–2024)

== See also ==
- 2024 NCAA Division I FBS football season
- 2024 NCAA Division I FCS football season
- 2024 NCAA Division III football season
- 2024 NAIA football season
- 2024 U Sports football season
