= Adrian Jones (American football coach) =

American football coach (born 1974)

Current position
- Title: Head coach
- Team: Elizabeth City State
- Conference: CIAA
- Record: 4–6

Biographical details
- Born: January 3, 1974 (age 52); Durham, North Carolina, U.S.
- Education: North Carolina Central University (2001)

Playing career
- 1994–1997: North Carolina Central
- 2000: Greensboro Prowlers
- 2001: Carolina Cobras
- 2002: Augusta Stallions
- 2003: Carolina Cobras
- Position: Defensive back

Coaching career (HC unless noted)
- 2003: North Carolina Central (OLB)
- 2004–2005: North Carolina Central (DB)
- 2006: South Georgia Wildcats (DC)
- 2007–2013: Southern E&S HS (NC)
- 2014–2015: North Carolina Central (RB)
- 2016–2024: Shaw
- 2025–present: Elizabeth City State

Head coaching record
- Overall: 39–51 (college); 64–29 (high school)

Accomplishments and honors

Awards
- 3× All-CIAA (1994, 1996–1997); 1× Division II All-American (1996)

Adrian Jones (born January 3, 1974) is an American football coach. He is the head football coach for Elizabeth City State University a position he has held since 2025. He was the head football coach for the Southern School of Energy and Sustainability from 2007 to 2013 and Shaw University from 2016 to 2024. He also coached for North Carolina Central and the South Georgia Wildcats of the af2. He played college football for North Carolina Central as a defensive back and professionally for the Greensboro Prowlers, Carolina Cobras, and Augusta Stallions of the Arena Football League (AFL).

== Head coaching record ==
=== College ===
| Year | Team | Overall | Conference | Standing | Bowl/playoffs |
|---|---|---|---|---|---|
Shaw Bears (Central Intercollegiate Athletic Association) (2016–2024)
| 2016 | Shaw | 2–8 | 2–5 | T–4th (Southern) | |
| 2017 | Shaw | 3–7 | 2–5 | T–4th (Southern) | |
| 2018 | Shaw | 5–5 | 4–2 | T–2nd (Southern) | |
| 2019 | Shaw | 6–4 | 5–2 | 2nd (Southern) | |
| 2020–21 | No team—COVID-19 | | | | |
| 2021 | Shaw | 6–4 | 5–2 | 2nd (Southern) | |
| 2022 | Shaw | 4–6 | 4–4 | 2nd (Southern) | |
| 2023 | Shaw | 3–7 | 3–5 | 5th (Southern) | |
| 2024 | Shaw | 6–4 | 4–3 | T–5th | |
| Shaw: | | 35–45 | 29–28 | | |
Elizabeth City State Vikings (Central Intercollegiate Athletic Association) (2025–present)
| 2025 | Elizabeth City State | 4–6 | 4–3 | T–4th | |
| Elizabeth City State: | | 4–6 | 4–3 | | |
| Total: | | 39–51 | | | |

=== High school ===
| Year | Team | Overall | Conference | Standing | Bowl/playoffs |
|---|---|---|---|---|---|
Southern S&E Spartans () (2007–2013)
| 2007 | Southern S&E | 10–5 | 6–1 | 1st | |
| 2008 | Southern S&E | 9–4 | 5–3 | 4th | |
| 2009 | Southern S&E | 12–2 | 6–0 | 1st | |
| 2010 | Southern S&E | 6–7 | 5–1 | 2nd | |
| 2011 | Southern S&E | 7–4 | 5–1 | 2nd | |
| 2012 | Southern S&E | 6–5 | 5–1 | 2nd | |
| 2013 | Southern S&E | 14–2 | 7–0 | 1st | |
| Southern S&E: | | 64–29 | 39–7 | | |
| Total: | | 64–29 | | | |
National championship Conference title Conference division title or championship game berth
