= Jaaron Joseph =

American gridiron football player (born 2002)

No. 33 – Edmonton Elks
- Position: Defensive back
- Roster status: Practice roster
- CFL status: American

Personal information
- Born: January 5, 2002 (age 24); Nyack, New York, U. S.
- Listed height: 6 ft 2 in (1.88 m)
- Listed weight: 210 lb (95 kg)

Career information
- High school: Albertus Magnus (Bardonia, New York)
- College: Southern Connecticut (2020–2022); Emporia State (2023–2024)
- NFL draft: 2025: undrafted

Career history
- Edmonton Elks (2026–present)

Awards and highlights
- Grey Cup champion (2026); Second-team D-II All-American (2024); First-team All-MIAA (2024); Second-team All-MIAA (2023)
- Stats at CFL.ca

Jaaron Joseph (born January 5, 2002) is an American professional football defensive back for the Edmonton Elks of the Canadian Football League (CFL). He played college football for the Southern Connecticut Owls and Emporia State Hornets.

== Early life ==
Joseph was born on January 5, 2002 in Nyack, New York. He attended Albertus Magnus High School in Bardonia, New York.

== College career ==
Joseph played college football for the Southern Connecticut Owls from 2020 to 2022 and Emporia State Hornets from 2023 to 2024. In the 2022 season, he played in 11 games, recording 21 tackles, four pass break ups and a forced fumble.

Joseph then transferred to Emporia State University ahead of the 2023 season. In two years for the Hornets, he logged 117 tackles, including 8.5 for loss, six interceptions, with one pick-six, 28 pass defenses, two forced fumbles and one fumble recovery. Joseph earned second-team All-Mid-America Intercollegiate Athletics Association honors in 2023 and first-team in 2024. As a senior, he also was named to the second-team D-II All-American team.

== Professional career ==
Pre-draft measurables
Height	Weight	Arm length	Hand span	Wingspan	40-yard dash	10-yard split	20-yard split	20-yard shuttle	Three-cone drill	Vertical jump	Broad jump	Bench press
6 ft 0 in (1.83 m)	205 lb (93 kg)	31 7/8 in (0.81 m)	9 3/8 in (0.24 m)	6 ft 5 7/8 in (1.98 m)	4.62 s	1.59 s	2.68 s	4.46 s	7.26 s	35 in (0.89 m)	10 ft 1 in (3.07 m)	16 reps
All values from Pro day

On December 8, 2025, Joseph signed the Edmonton Elks of the Canadian Football League (CFL). On May 31, 2026, he was assigned to the practice roster. On October 23, Joseph was elevated to the active roster and made his first start the following day against the Saskatchewan Roughriders. On October 25, he reverted to the practice roster.
