= Angelo State University =

Public university in San Angelo, Texas, US

- Former names: San Angelo College (1928–1965); Angelo State College (1965–1969)
- Motto: Fiat Lux
- Motto in English: Let there be light
- Type: Public university
- Established: 1928; 98 years ago
- Parent institution: Texas Tech University System
- Academic affiliations: Space-grant
- Endowment: $301 million (FY2025) (ASU only) $3.35 billion (FY2025) (system-wide)
- Budget: $174 million (FY2026)
- Chancellor: Brandon Creighton
- President: Lt. General Ronnie Hawkins
- Academic staff: 447 (fall 2024)
- Students: 12,003 (fall 2025)
- Undergraduates: 10,103 (fall 2025)
- Postgraduates: 1,900 (fall 2025)
- Location: San Angelo, Texas, United States; 31°26′16″N 100°27′39″W
- Campus: Small city, 268 acres (108 ha)
- Colors: Blue and gold
- Nicknames: Rams and Rambelles
- Sporting affiliations: NCAA Division II – Lone Star
- Mascots: Dominic the Ram (live); Roscoe and Bella (costumed)
- Website: angelo.edu
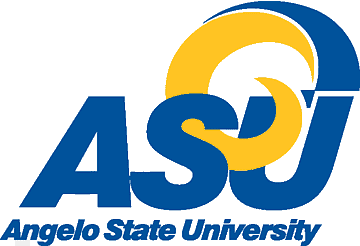

Angelo State University is a public university in San Angelo, Texas, United States. It was founded in 1928 as San Angelo College. It gained university status and awarded its first baccalaureate degrees in 1967 and graduate degrees in 1969, the same year it took on its current name. It offers 50 undergraduate programs and 31 graduate programs. It is the second-largest campus in the Texas Tech University System.

== History ==
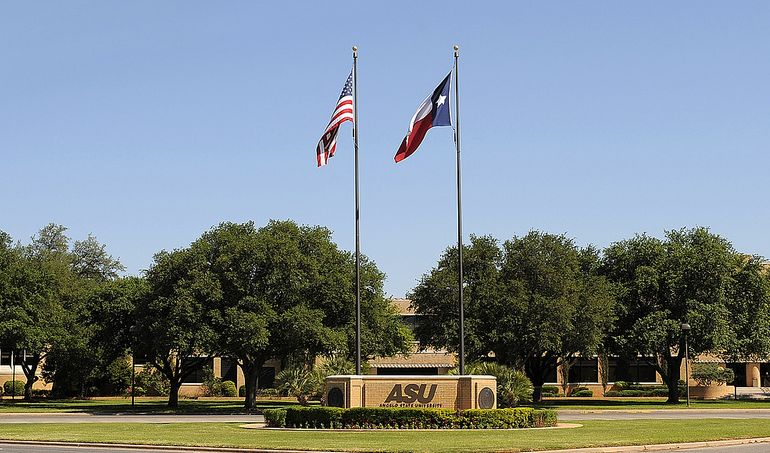
Main entrance to Angelo State University

The history of ASU can be traced to 1928, when San Angelo College was established following a municipal election held in 1926. Organized as part of the city school system, for many years, the two-year college occupied a site on North Oakes Street near the commercial center of the city. The voters of Tom Green County in 1945 created a county junior college district and elected the first board of trustees. In 1947, the first building was constructed on the present university site.

The university has experienced a rapid transition from a regional junior college to an accredited senior institution of higher learning. Pushed through the legislature by State Senator Dorsey B. Hardeman, a former mayor of San Angelo, the former San Angelo College was transformed into Angelo State College in 1965 by an act of the 58th Session of the Texas State Legislature in 1963. The transfer of authority from the board of trustees of the junior college to the Board of Regents, State Senior Colleges, became effective on September 1, 1965. In May 1967, the first baccalaureate degrees were awarded. Shortly after Hardeman retired from the Texas Senate, the name of the institution was changed to Angelo State University in May 1969.

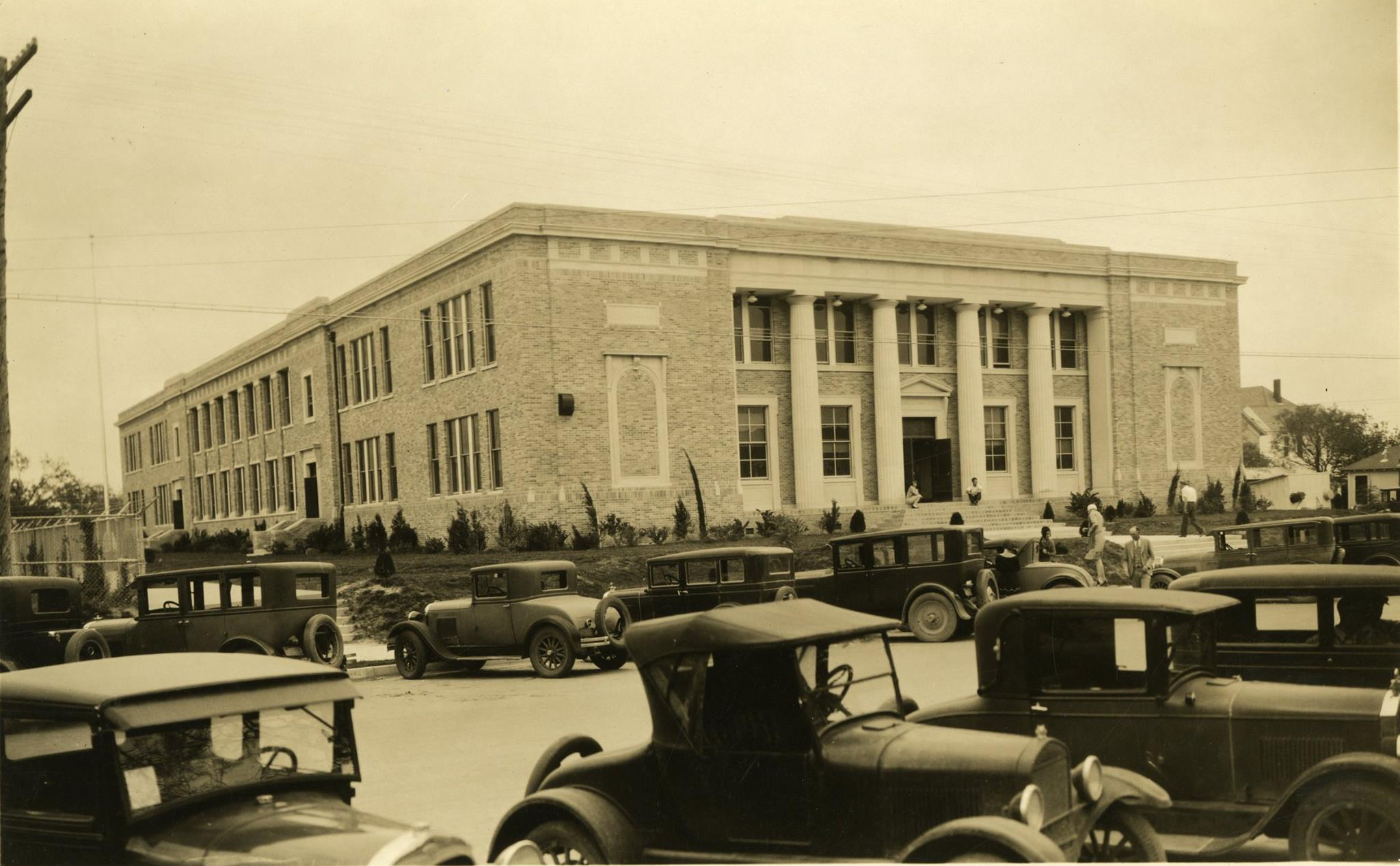
The Old Main Building on North Oaks in 1930

The graduate program was initiated in 1970 with the start of the university's College of Graduate Studies. During a major realignment of the Texas University systems, Angelo State University was designated as a member of the Texas State University System in 1975, along with Sam Houston State University, Southwest Texas State University, and Sul Ross State University, when the 64th Texas Legislature changed the name of the governing board to Board of Regents, Texas State University System.

In the fall of 2007, the Alumni Association voted to request a move to the Texas Tech University System from the Texas State University System. The merger received widespread support in San Angelo and Lubbock, where Texas Tech University is located. The bill was approved, signed by Gov. Rick Perry, and voted into the Texas Constitution by the electorate, making Angelo State University accountable to the Texas Tech System Board of Regents in late 2007.

The first doctoral program, the doctorate of physical therapy through the College of Nursing and Allied Health, was offered in 2009.

Angelo State completed its first capital campaign in 2013, raising $35 million for facility construction, scholarships, and academic support. After reaching the original goal of $25 million in the first 15 months of the campaign, the goal was raised to $35 million, which was reached in June 2013.

== Academics ==
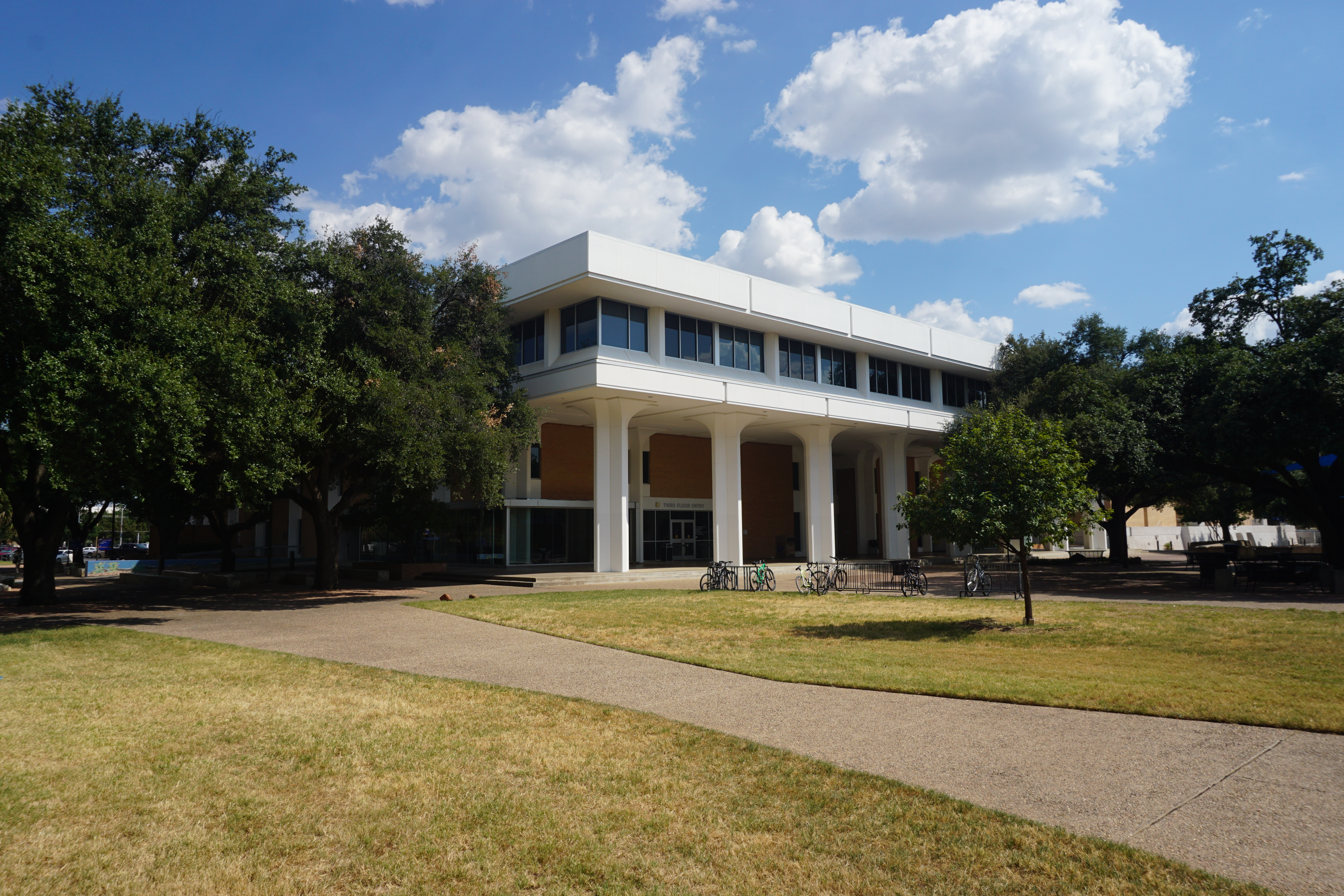
Porter Henderson Library at Angelo State University

Angelo State's students come from all across Texas with an additional 46 states and 22 other countries also represented in the university's total enrollment. The university is accredited by the Southern Association of Colleges and Schools.

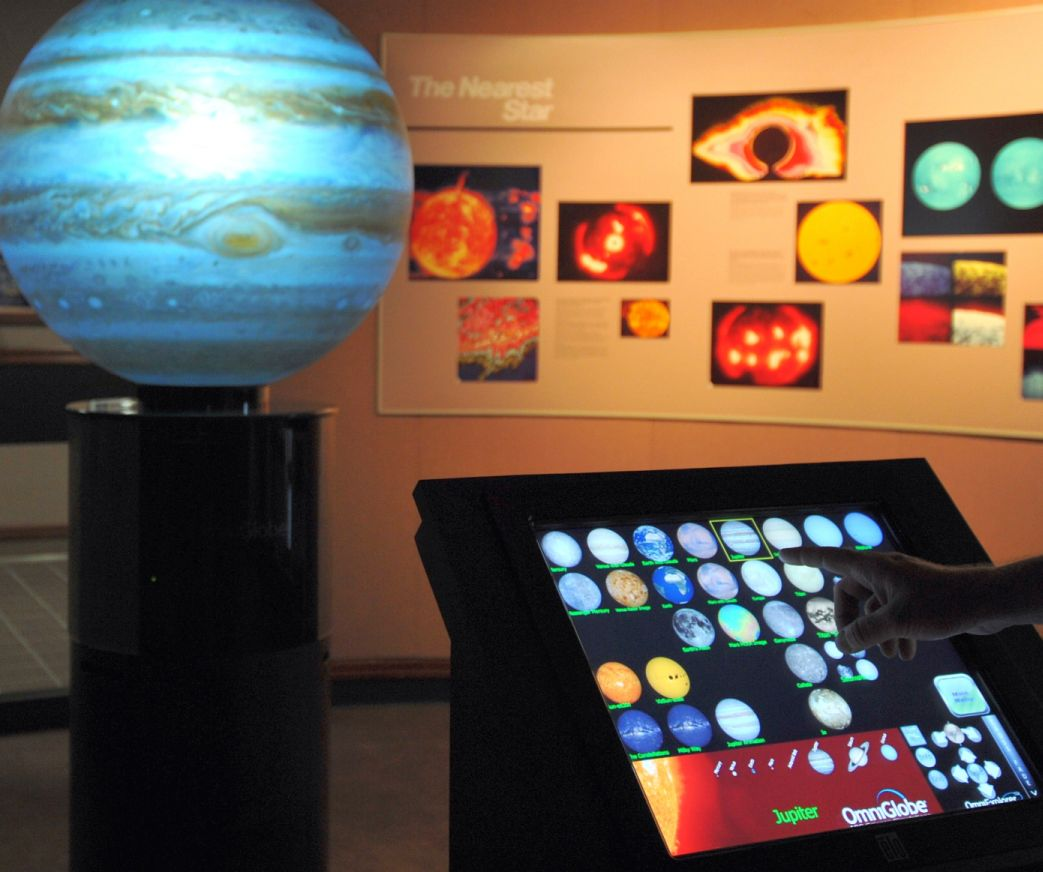
Touch-screen controlled OmniGlobe outside the ASU Planetarium in the Physics building

Of the over 3,000 universities nationwide, Angelo State University ranked 85th in endowment funds per student. The interest earned from the endowment goes towards scholarships and academic support.

Angelo State University offers 35 minor programs, 50 bachelor's, 31 master's, and one doctoral degree program. The graduate school at Angelo State was authorized by the Board of Regents, State Senior Colleges, on May 15, 1970, and approved by The Texas Higher Education Coordinating Board on October 19, 1970. In 2009, the university was authorized by the Texas Higher Education Coordinating Board to offer doctoral level degrees, starting with a doctorate in physical therapy.

Angelo State University is divided into six colleges, including the Norris-Vincent College of Business, College of Education, College of Arts and Humanities, Archer College of Health and Human Services, College of Science and Engineering, and College of Graduate Studies and Research.

=== Rankings ===
U.S. News & World Report ranked Angelo State's online graduate education program 36th in the nation and its Graduate Degree in Nursing ranked 39th in the nation in its 2016 Best Colleges report.

US Veterans magazine ranked Angelo State University as a "Best of the Best" in its 2015 listing of top veteran-friendly schools.

SourceMedia and its magazine On Wall Street named Angelo State University one of the nation's "75 Leading Schools for Financial Planners" for 2016.

The Chronicle of Higher Education named Angelo State University one of the nation's "Great Colleges to Work For" for 2018. ASU was one of only 84 institutions of higher education recognized nationally by The Chronicle, and also ranked highly enough to be one of only 42 institutions named to their 2018 Honor Roll. The 2018 recognition marks the fourth straight year ASU was made both the "Great Colleges to Work For" list and the Honor Roll.

== Campus ==
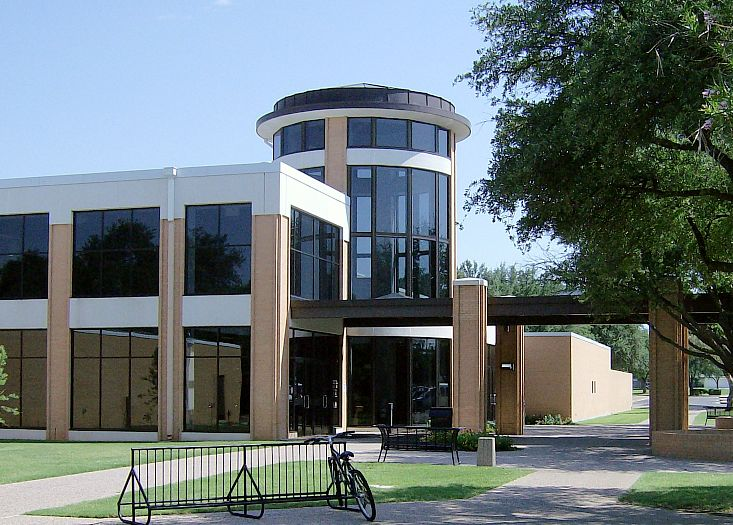
Houston Harte University Center

The main campus is situated on 268 acres (1.08 km^{2}). It is centered on the campus mall, a tree-lined pedestrian walkway that covers over 1 mile (1.6 km) and connects most major buildings. It has changed significantly since 1965 as a result of the development of an ultramodern physical plant now valued at over $450 million. The university consists of over 60 buildings encompassing 1,940,768 square feet (180,303.2 m^{2}) of available space.

Major academic buildings include the Porter Henderson Library, which was completed in the fall of 1967, and the Raymond M. Cavness Science Building, which was opened in the spring of 1968. An academic building and a 10-story women's high-rise residence hall and accompanying food-service center were opened in September 1968. A second 10-story residence hall for men opened in September 1969. The modernization and expansion of the Houston Harte University Center was completed during the summer of 1971, and a physical education complex was opened in the summer of 1972. The Mayer Museum, a variety museum that consists of natural science, art, history, and a permanent arrowhead collection, finished construction in 2021.

The Robert and Nona Carr Education-Fine Arts Building, completed during the spring of 1976, provides ultramodern facilities for the Departments of Education, Art and Music, and Communications, Drama, and Journalism. In addition to an extensive array of teaching facilities, many special-use areas are incorporated in the building, including the theater, recital hall, and band hall, and an area for art design and ceramics. The 60,000-sq-ft (5,600 m^{2}) Emil C. Rassman Building, completed during the summer of 1983, houses the Department of Business Administration, the Department of Accounting, Economics, and Finance, and Department of Aerospace Studies, as well as the office of the Dean of the College of Professional Studies.

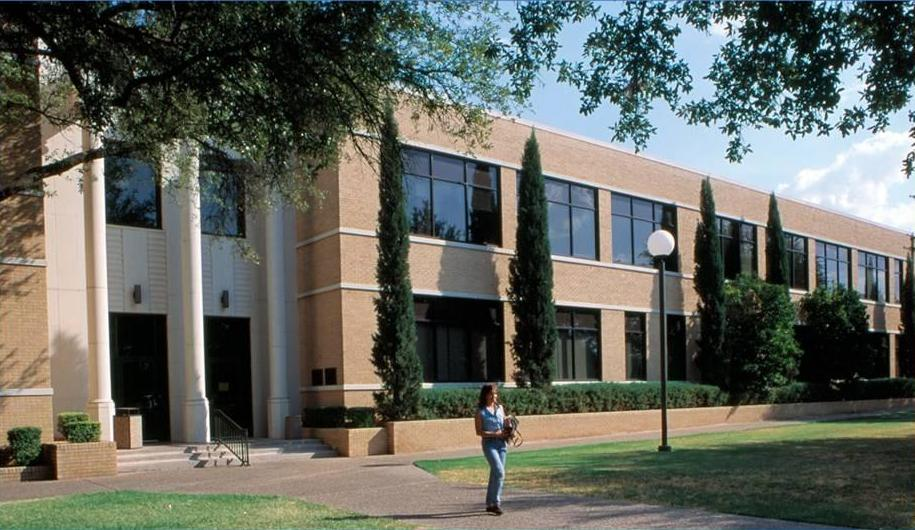
Hardeman Building

The Lloyd D. and Johnell S. Vincent Nursing-Physical Science Building was completed during the spring semester of 1985. Located across the mall from the Physical Education Building and the Emil C. Rassman Building, the building contains about 73,000 sq ft (6,800 m^{2}) arranged over two floors. The building houses the Physics and Geosciences Department, David L. Hirschfeld Department of Engineering, the Department of Security Studies and Criminal Justice, and offices for the Dean of the College of Sciences and Engineering. Specialized teaching and laboratory facilities are included for physics, physical science, geology, and engineering. The building houses one of the largest planetariums among the nation's colleges and universities, featuring a 50-ft (15 m) dome and seating for 114. The facility is used as a lecture hall and for other special programs. It is also used in conjunction with academic courses in astronomy and for public shows. The 86,000-sq-ft (8,000 m^{2}) Mathematics-Computer Science Building, completed in 1996, houses the Department of Mathematics and the Department of Computer Science, as well as facilities to support the university's mainframe computing services. Other recent additions include expansion of the Cavness Science Building, construction of the new Texan Hall residences, and adding another floor to the Porter Henderson Library to accommodate the Communications, Drama, and Journalism Department and Honors Program. The Management Instruction and Research Center is a 6,000-acre (24 km^{2}) ranch on O.C. Fisher Lake property, which Angelo State has under long-term lease from the US Corps of Engineers. These facilities support the programs in animal science and biology and a wide range of management and research activities.

=== Safety and security ===
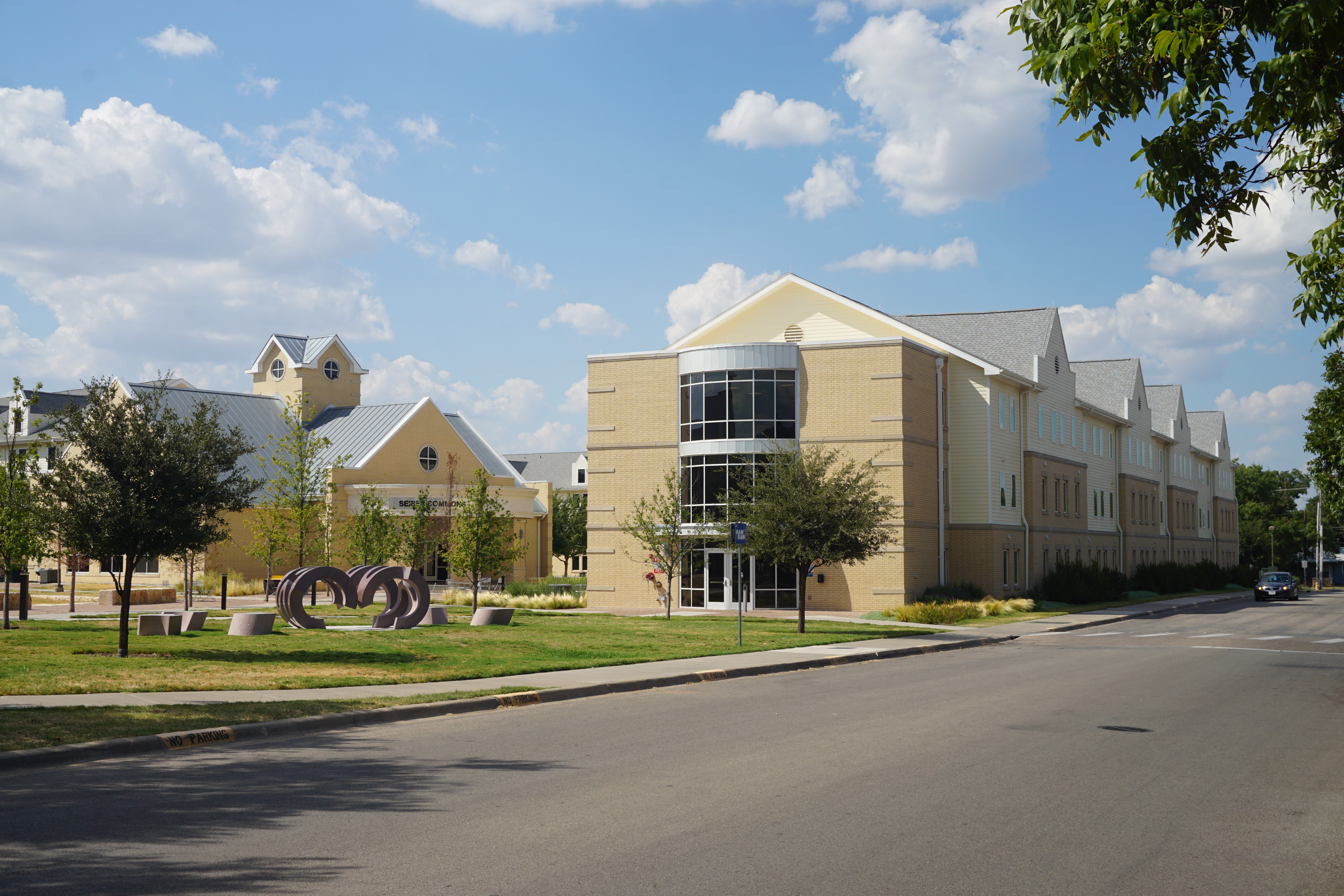
Centennial Village

Sixteen emergency call boxes are strategically spread across campus. In the case of an emergency and the need for immediate assistance, all calls are routed directly to the Angelo State Police Department. In addition Angelo State has a "Lifeline App" for IPhone or Android made available free of charge. It can be used for distress calls or with use of a hands-free timer that will send for help if not deactivated. GPS location can be used to instantly send ASU Police to that location. The Angelo State University Police Department employs 17 full-time peace officers and five civilian support personnel (police dispatchers). ASUPD is a state law enforcement agency commissioned by the Texas Tech University System with county-wide jurisdiction in Tom Green County (including roads and highways) pursuant to the Texas Education Code, Section 51.203; entitled "Campus Peace Officers", with the same legal powers given to municipal and county peace officers in the State of Texas. They patrol campus property and the surrounding areas of owned and leased property, 24 hours per day, every day of the year using primarily marked patrol vehicles and unmarked vehicles. The department has a patrol division, criminal investigations division, and a communications division.

The ASU alert system sends out messages to all campus emails and cell phones registered through the system in the case of any campus or regional emergency.

== Student life ==
Undergraduate demographics as of Fall 2023
Race and ethnicity	Total
White	43%
Hispanic	42%
Black	6%
Two or more races	4%
International student	3%
Asian	1%
Unknown	1%
Economic diversity
Low-income (Note: The percentage of students who received an income-based federal Pell grant intended for low-income students.)	46%
Affluent (Note: The percentage of students who are a part of the American middle class at the bare minimum.)	54%

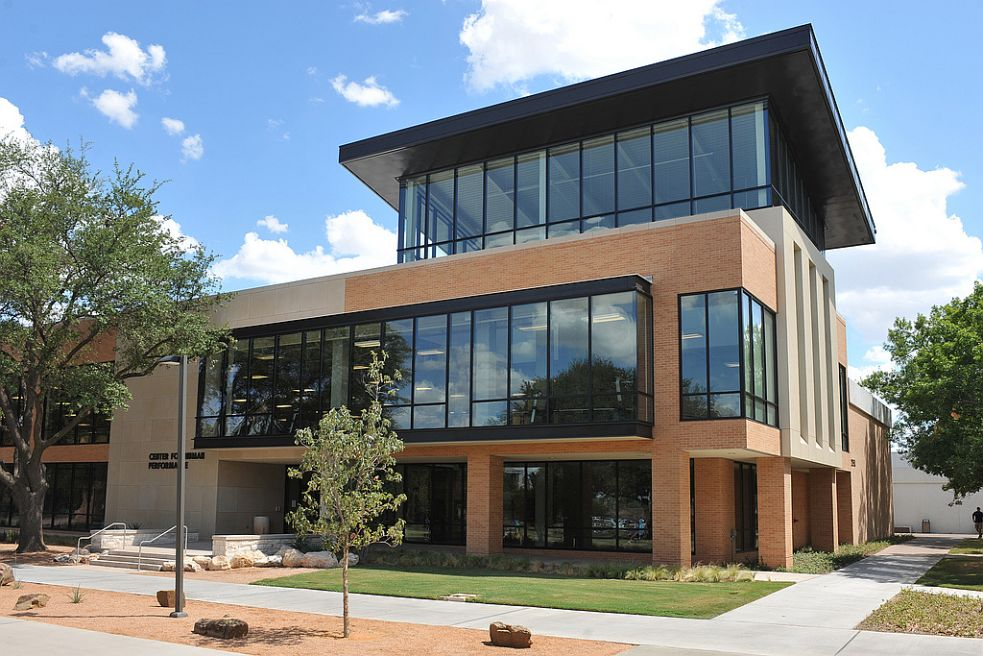
Center for Human Performance

There are several fraternities and sororities on campus. Honor societies, religious organizations, and sports teams abound.

The Houston Harte University Center serves students' recreational and community needs. For student recreation, it offers multiple pool, ping pong, and air hockey tables, ample couch and student meeting areas. The center has eight different dining options including Starbucks, Chick-fil-A, and Subway. It also houses the Student Credit Union, the Campus Bookstore and USPS Post Office.

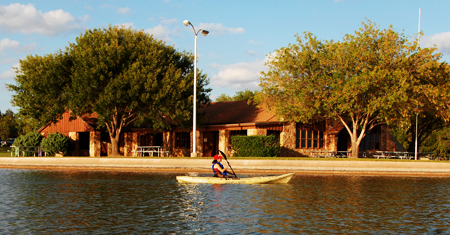
The ASU Lake House at Lake Nasworthy

=== Lake House ===
The off-campus Angelo State Lake House at nearby Lake Nasworthy offers many recreational opportunities for students. The Lake House provides lake and beach access, a basketball court, playground, and sand volleyball courts, as well as canoes and kayaks for free student use. It also provides meeting and recreational rooms and cooking facilities for students, faculty, and student organizations.

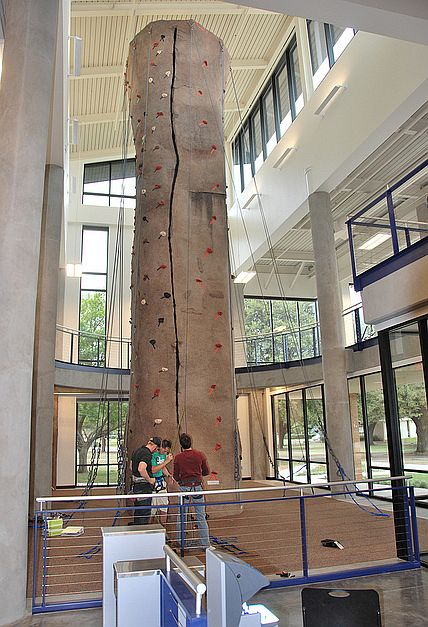
Rock Climbing Gym

=== Student housing ===
The University provides on-campus housing for over 2,500 students. Over 25% of the student body resides on campus. The university's housing was ranked fifth in the nation on a list of "Most Inviting Yet Affordable College Dorms in America" by AffordableSchools.net, a higher-education resource website. The seven residential facilities on campus have options that range from traditional dormitory units to those that offer private bedroom suites with a common living area and kitchenette.

=== Student media ===
The university operates Ram TV, available locally in San Angelo on SuddenLink cable channel 6. The channel operates 24 hours a day, featuring new original programming Monday through Thursday during prime time. The Ram Page is the university's official weekly published student-run newspaper. The Ramdiculous Page is a satirical newspaper independently produced on campus by Angelo State students. Ram Radio is an Internet station broadcasting 24 hours a day. Angelo State will also soon contribute news reports to the newly acquired local NPR station KNCH. Students may access ASU news information on their iPhones on the ASU Mobile app.

=== Intramural and club sports ===
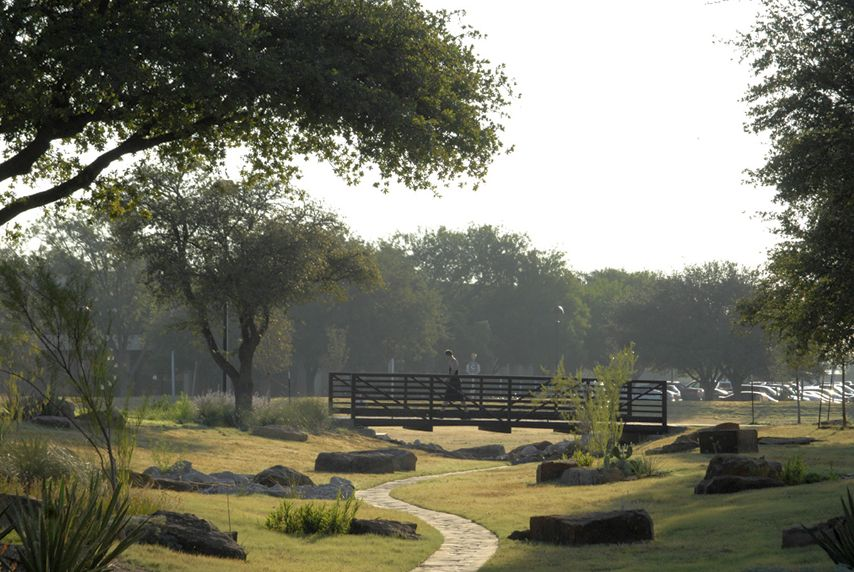
Campus Green & Jogging Trail

ASU has extensive facilities available for intramural athletics. ASU's intramural complex has over 235,000 square feet of artificial Hellas Turf broken into three 7-on-7 flag football fields, four 4-on-4 flag football fields, two softball fields, two soccer fields and a rugby field. The field is fully lighted for night time use. Intramural basketball teams play in the recreational Center for Human Performance gym. Three racquetball courts are also located in the CHP. Angelo State's competitive flag football teams have won national championships in 2009, 2010, 2012 and 2013

== Athletics ==
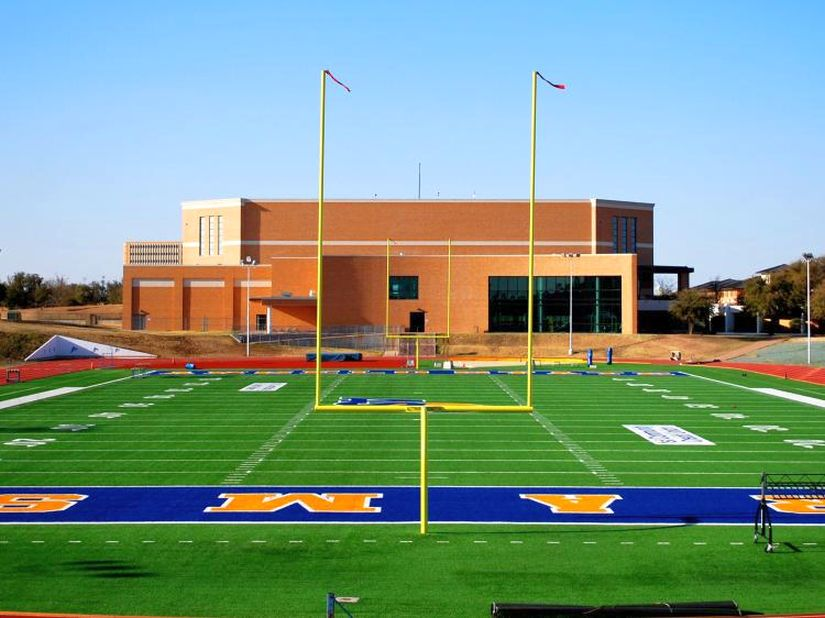
LeGrand Football Stadium

Angelo State athletic teams are the Rams and Rambelles. The university is a member of the Division II level of the National Collegiate Athletic Association (NCAA), primarily competing in the Lone Star Conference (LSC) since the 1968–69 academic year. Prior to becoming a four-year institution, Angelo State previously competed in the National Junior College Athletic Association (NJCAA) until after the 1963–64 academic year.

Angelo State competes in 13 intercollegiate varsity sports: Men's sports include baseball, basketball, cross country, football and track & field; while women's sports include basketball, cross country, golf, soccer, softball, soccer, tennis, track & field and volleyball.

=== Attendance ===
Attendance and support of ASU athletics is high, in DII, attendance at ASU athletic games has ranked in the top 20 schools in the nation 15 times in the last 20 years.

== Traditions ==
=== Ram Jam ===
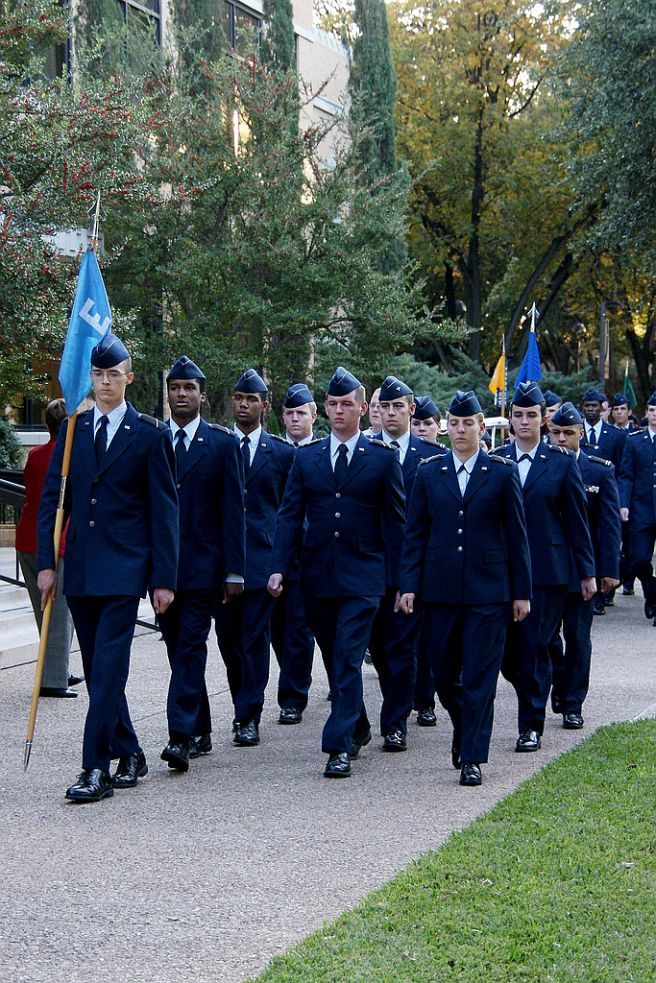
Angelo State ROTC

The official Ram Jam was started by the Alumni Association in 2003 and has grown to become the large pregame football tailgating parties they are today. During the fall semester outside the LeGrand Alumni Center, students, alumni, and community members park their cars in the parking lot and hang out around the center to grill and socialize. The events also feature local bands to provide entertainment, free food and refreshments, bounce houses and other games for kids, and alcoholic beverages for those 21 and up. The Ram Band, the ASU dance team, the Angelettes, and the ASU Cheerleaders also perform and everyone walks over to the stadium prior to the game.

=== Ring ceremony ===
Prior to each commencement, the ASU Alumni Association hosts a ring ceremony where the university president presents class rings to recipients. Appearing at each ceremony is ASU's mascot, Dominic. After receiving their rings, recipients touch their rings to Dominic's horns for strength, or rub them through his wool for luck. Though Angelo State rings have existed since the beginning of the university, a new official ASU ring was introduced by the ASU Alumni Society in 2003. The top of the Angelo State class ring presents the ASU seal. One side of the ring shows the State of Texas with a star marking San Angelo; below that is an oak branch. On the other side is an image of the mascot, Dominic.

=== Mascots ===
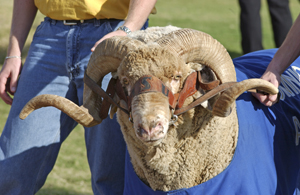
Dominic

Angelo State's ram went by a variety of names until 1963, when the student body held an election to decide on a permanent moniker, and "Dominic" won out. Today, Dominic is a regular fixture at ASU activities, ranging from the ring ceremony to outdoor athletic events. He is typically kept close to the end zone at Angelo State football games.

Two costumed mascots, Roscoe and Bella, appear at most athletic events and many community activities, where they lead cheers and interact with students and fans. Roscoe has appeared at many games since the 1960s courtesy of the Pi Kappa Alpha fraternity, one of the oldest and most active fraternities on the ASU campus. Bella made her debut in October 2010, supported by the Delta Zeta she appears with Roscoe and the ASU cheerleaders at most athletic and student-body events.

== Notable people ==
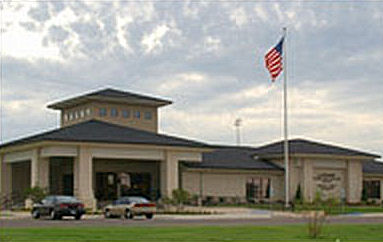
Angelo State Alumni Center

Angelo State University alumni have gone on to succeed in professions on the state and national levels. They include major executives at Fortune 500 companies, Emmy award-nominated actors, Grammy Award-winning musicians, Super Bowl winners, authors of number-one books on The New York Times bestseller list, Texas Supreme Court justices, Texas state representatives and senators, and United States congressmen.
