= 2011–12 Great American Conference championships =

Great American Conference
- Conference: NCAA
- Founded: 2011
- Division: Division II

The Great American Conference sponsors championship events for 12 of its 13 sports. The football champion is the team with the best conference record.

The 2011–12 season was the first year of the conference. Arkansas Tech led the way with four championships (3 team, 1 individual). East Central and Harding each had three. As a new conference it did not receive automatic qualifying to NCAA championships; however, several teams and individuals were selected to postseason championships.

East Central, Harding, and Southern Arkansas participated in the men's cross country regional meet with ECU placing 2nd (3 top 10 runners) to advance to the national meet where ECU earned an 11th-place finish. Arkansas Tech, East Central, Harding, and Southern Arkansas participated in the women's cross country regional meet with HU placing 7th (1 top 10 runner). Arkansas Tech's volleyball team fell in the regional first round while the men's basketball team advanced to the regional finals, and Ouachita Baptist's men's tennis team advanced to the national quarterfinals. Rebecka Surteval (ATU) finished 16th at the women's golf super regional. Jack Garrett (ATU) finished 12th and Matt Jennings (HSU) finished 54th at the men's golf super regional. Southern Arkansas ended the Baseball regional with a 1–2 record, winning its first game.

== Men's cross country ==
Champion
Team – East Central
Individual – Ezekiel Kissorio, East Central

East Central placed the top three individual finishes and four of the top six to capture the inaugural Great American Conference men's cross country championship.

ECU's Ezekiel Kissorio, Armando Saldivar, and Daniel Kiptoo finished first, second, and third, respectively. All seven of ECU's designated runners finished in the top 10. ECU finished with a total of 17 points.

- Runner of the Year

Ezekiel Kissorio, East Central

- Freshman of the Year

Lajos Farkas, Harding

- Coach of the Year

Steve Sawyer, East Central

- All-GAC Team

Ezekiel Kissorio, East Central
Armando Saldivar, East Central
Daniel Kiptoo, East Central
Cale Eidson, East Central
Jimmy Sutrick, East Central
Lajos Farkas, Harding
Austin Christian, East Central
Mickey Hammer, Southern Arkansas
Joel Dutton, East Central
Phillip Biwott, Harding

=== Championships ===
Saturday, October 22
Host: Harding University (Searcy, AR)

| Team | | | Individual (Top Ten) | | |
| 1 | East Central | 17 | 1 | Ezekiel Kissorio (ECU) | 24:26.33 |
| 2 | Harding | 47 | 2 | Armando Saldivar (ECU) | 24:32.84 |
| 3 | Southern Arkansas | 75 | 3 | Daniel Kiptoo (ECU) | 24:39.32 |
| 4 | Arkansas-Monticello | 115 | 4 | Philip Biwott (HU) | 25:00.41 |
| | | | 5 | Cale Eidson (ECU) | 25:05.37 |
| | | | 6 | Jimmy Sutrick (ECU) | 25:05.54 |
| | | | 7 | Lajos Farkas (HU) | 25:15.97 |
| | | | 8 | Austin Christian (ECU) | 25:18.01 |
| | | | 9 | Mickey Hammer (SAU) | 25:33.99 |
| | | | 10 | Joel Dutton (ECU) | 25:38.73 |

== Women's cross country ==
Champion
Team – Harding
Individual – Gladys Kimtai, Harding

Harding placed all seven of its runners in the top 20 to win the inaugural Great American Conference women's cross country championship.

Four of Harding's seven runners finished in top 10 in the 5-kilometer race, highlighted by a first-place finish from Gladys Kimtai and a second-place finish from Eva Zaborowska. Harding finished with a total of 27 points.

- Runner of the Year

Gladys Kimtai, Harding

- Freshman of the Year

Ewa Zaborowska, Harding

- Coach of the Year

Steve Guymon, Harding

- All-GAC 1st Team

Olivia Campbell, Arkansas Tech
Cheryl Nolan, Arkansas Tech
Samantha Bartlett, East Central
ReGina Germaine, East Central
Colleta Songol, East Central
Amber Walker, East Central
Dallis Bailey, Harding
Gladys Kimtai, Harding
Mary Samoei, Harding
Ewa Zaborowska, Harding

- All-GAC 2nd Team

Miranda Claxton, East Central
Andrea McKinney, East Central
Allison Dixon, Harding
Amber Priest, Harding
Rachel Roberts, Harding
Johanna Casey, Ouachita Baptist
Carli Langley, Southern Arkansas
Olivia Ornelas, Southern Arkansas
Jennifer Osborn, Southwestern Oklahoma State
Melissa Banks, Southwestern Oklahoma State

=== Championships ===
Saturday, October 22
Host: Harding University (Searcy, AR)

| Team | | | Individual (Top Ten) | | |
| 1 | Harding | 27 | 1 | Gladys Kimtai (HU) | 17:18.07 |
| 2 | East Central | 39 | 2 | Ewa Zaborowska (HU) | 17:30.72 |
| 3 | Arkansas Tech | 109 | 3 | Cheryl Nolan (ATU) | 17:44.86 |
| 4 | Southern Arkansas | 111 | 4 | Mary Samoei (HU) | 17:49.80 |
| 5 | Southwestern Oklahoma State | 112 | 5 | Amber Walker (ECU) | 17:56.09 |
| 6 | Ouachita Baptist | 167 | 6 | Samantha Bartlett (ECU) | 18:08.19 |
| 7 | Henderson State | 191 | 7 | ReGina Germaine (ECU) | 18:31.49 |
| 8 | Southeastern Oklahoma State | 224 | 8 | Dallis Bailey (HU) | 18:36.85 |
| 9 | Arkansas-Monticello | 275 | 9 | Olivia Campbell (ATU) | 18:38.53 |
| | | | 10 | Colleta Songol (ECU) | 18:45.24 |

== Football ==
Champion
Ouachita Baptist

Ouachita Baptist clinched the inaugural Great American Conference Championship by defeating Southeastern Oklahoma State with a final score of 21–18. OBU (7–2, 6–0 GAC) finished the season at 7–3, and 6–1 in Great American Conference play. The conference championship marks the first since 1982.

- Offensive Player of the Year

Casey Cooper, Ouachita Baptist

- Defensive Player of the Year

Jason Catchings, East Central

- Freshman of the Year

Devin Benton, Southwestern Oklahoma State

- Coach of the Year

Todd Knight, Ouachita Baptist

- All-GAC 1st Team

QB – Casey Cooper, Ouachita Baptist
RB – Mark Johnson, Southern Arkansas
RB – Kale Gelles, Harding
WR – D.J. Stephens, Arkansas-Monticello
WR – A.J. Whitmore, Arkansas Tech
WR – Zach Patteson, East Central
TE – Ryan Shelley, Southeastern Oklahoma State
UT – Jeremy Holt, Harding
C – Seth Oxner, Arkansas-Monticello
OL – Carlos Savala, East Central
OL – Garrett Taylor, Harding
OL – Roy Richard, Ouachita Baptist
OL – Desmund Farris, East Central
DE – Armonty Bryant, East Central
DE – Roland Dampeer, Arkansas Tech
DT – Taurus Williams, Ouachita Baptist
DT – Antonio Leak, Henderson State
ILB – Terrence Garrett, Ouachita Baptist
ILB – Keaton Stigger, Henderson State
OLB – Jason Catchings, East Central
OLB – Bennie Anderson, Henderson State
CB – Dontae Smith, East Central
CB – Marvin Tribble, Southwestern Oklahoma State
S – Clarence Laster, Southwestern Oklahoma State
S – Norris Wrenn, East Central
P – Derek Jambon, Arkansas-Monticello
K – Eddy Carmona, Harding
RS – A.J. Whitmore, Arkansas Tech

- All-GAC 2nd Team

QB – Tyler Vanderzee, East Central
RB – Jarvis Smith, Henderson State
RB – Nakita Myles, Arkansas-Monticello
WR – George Robbins, East Central
WR – Esau Bauknight, Southwestern Oklahoma State
WR – Brett Reece, Ouachita Baptist
TE – Phillip Supernaw, Ouachita Baptist
UT – Bruce Hatton, Southwestern Oklahoma State
C – Hunter Soper, Ouachita Baptist
OL – Kyle Smith, Ouachita Baptist
OL – Allen Hale, Southern Arkansas
OL – Corey Godbolt, Ouachita Baptist
OL – Tory Day, Harding
DE – Josh Aldridge, Harding
DE – Robbie Aldridge, Henderson State
DT – Calvin Ursin, Arkansas-Monticello
DT – Devin Benton, Southwestern Oklahoma State
ILB – Kerel James, East Central
ILB – Aaron Gillaspie, Harding
OLB – Johnny Seals, Southeastern Oklahoma State
OLB – Abraham Felton, Arkansas-Monticello
CB – Eric Crocker, Arkansas-Monticello
CB – A.J. Williams, Ouachita Baptist
S – Jeremy Rodenburg, Henderson State
S – Izzy Eziakor, Southeastern Oklahoma State
P – Brian Gonzalez, East Central
K – Colton Rainey, Southwestern Oklahoma State
RS – Dontae Smith, East Central

- All-GAC Honorable Mention

QB – Dustin Stenta, Southwestern Oklahoma State
RB – Chris Rycraw, Ouachita Baptist
WR – Kenneth Robey, Arkansas-Monticello
WR – Tyler O'Quin, Harding
TE – Colter Huff, East Central
C – David Rebata, Henderson State
OL – Kevin Rodriguez, Henderson State
OL – Ronald Penn, Arkansas-Monticello
DE – Lonnell Rice, East Central
DE – Lis Leota, Southwestern Oklahoma State
DT – Erik Howell, East Central
ILB – A.J. Steele, Southern Arkansas
ILB – Amos Cherry, East Central
OLB – Tyler McGrew, East Central
OLB – Augustine Ume-Ezeoke, Ouachita Baptist
CB – Wes Brady, Henderson State
CB – Roderick Cohn, Harding
S – Jasper Bodiford, Harding
S – Jacolby Stewart, Southern Arkansas
P – Clark Gaddis, Ouachita Baptist
RS – Travarus Brown, Southern Arkansas

=== Standings ===
| Team | Conference | | Overall | |
|---|---|---|---|---|
| Ouachita Baptist | 6–1 | .857 | 7–3 | .700 |
| Henderson State | 4–1 | .800 | 6–4 | .600 |
| East Central | 6–2 | .750 | 8–3 | .727 |
| Harding | 3–3 | .500 | 4–7 | .364 |
| Arkansas-Monticello | 3–3 | .500 | 5–6 | .455 |
| Southern Arkansas | 3–4 | .429 | 3–7 | .300 |
| Southwestern Oklahoma State | 3–5 | .375 | 5–6 | .455 |
| Arkansas Tech | 1–4 | .200 | 2–8 | .200 |
| Southeastern Oklahoma State | 1–7 | .125 | 2–8 | .200 |

=== Season ===
The Arkansas schools were not able to play a complete conference schedule due to the exit agreement with the Gulf South Conference.

| Date | | Away team | | Home team | |
|---|---|---|---|---|---|
| September 1 | | Henderson State | 14 | Central Arkansas | 38 |
| September 1 | | Southwestern Oklahoma State | 31 | Northwestern Oklahoma State | 28 |
| September 3 | * | Arkansas Tech | 31 | Arkansas-Monticello | 38 |
| September 3 | * | Harding | 63 | Southern Arkansas | 14 |
| September 3 | | East Central | 31 | Incarnate Word | 21 |
| September 10 | * | Southern Arkansas | 31 | Southwestern Oklahoma State | 22 |
| September 10 | | Central Oklahoma | 23 | Southeastern Oklahoma State | 30 |
| September 10 | | Texas College | 0 | Arkansas-Monticello | 41 |
| September 10 | * | Henderson State | 35 | Harding | 21 |
| September 10 | | Arkansas Tech | 31 | Southwest Baptist | 20 |
| September 10 | * | East Central | 18 | Ouachita Baptist | 31 |
| September 15 | | Shepherd Technical College | 0 | Harding | 75 |
| September 17 | ‡ | Northeastern State | 38 | East Central | 45 |
| September 17 | * | Southeastern Oklahoma State | 24 | Southern Arkansas | 21 |
| September 17 | | Delta State | 47 | Arkansas Tech | 32 |
| September 17 | * | Southwestern Oklahoma State | 17 | Henderson State | 13 |
| September 17 | *β | Ouachita Baptist | 38 | Arkansas-Monticello | 20 |
| September 22 | | Ouachita Baptist | 39 | Texas A&M-Commerce | 33 |
| September 24 | | Delta State | 34 | Henderson State | 31 |
| September 24 | | West Alabama | 17 | Arkansas Tech | 12 |
| September 24 | | Arkansas-Monticello | 5 | West Georgia | 21 |
| September 24 | | Harding | 20 | North Alabama | 28 |
| September 24 | * | Southeastern Oklahoma State | 27 | East Central | 37 |
| September 24 | | Central Oklahoma | 20 | Southwestern Oklahoma State | 27 |
| September 24 | | Southern Arkansas | 21 | Valdosta State | 38 |
| October 1 | | Henderson State | 50 | West Georgia | 30 |
| October 1 | | Arkansas Tech | 16 | Central Missouri | 42 |
| October 1 | | East Central | 21 | Central Oklahoma | 41 |
| October 1 | | Ouachita Baptist | 14 | Delta State | 45 |
| October 1 | | Harding | 17 | West Alabama | 31 |
| October 1 | * | Southwestern Oklahoma State | 23 | Southeastern Oklahoma State | 20 |
| October 1 | | Valdosta State | 9 | Arkansas-Monticello | 23 |
| October 1 | | North Alabama | 42 | Southern Arkansas | 14 |
| October 6 | | Arkansas-Monticello | 20 | Delta State | 34 |
| October 8 | | Valdosta State | 40 | Ouachita Baptist | 13 |
| October 8 | * | East Central | 29 | Southwestern Oklahoma State | 12 |
| October 8 | | Northeastern State | 38 | Southeastern Oklahoma State | 28 |
| October 8 | | Southern Arkansas | 10 | West Alabama | 38 |
| October 8 | | West Georgia | 41 | Harding | 24 |
| October 8 | | North Alabama | 44 | Arkansas Tech | 10 |
| October 15 | * | Henderson State | 30 | Southeastern Oklahoma State | 14 |
| October 15 | | Harding | 41 | Northeastern State | 49 |
| October 15 | * | Arkansas Tech | 17 | Southern Arkansas | 49 |
| October 15 | * | Arkansas-Monticello | 9 | East Central | 34 |
| October 15 | * | Ouachita Baptist | 48 | Southwestern Oklahoma State | 38 |
| October 22 | * | Southern Arkansas | 43 | Ouachita Baptist | 53 |
| October 22 | * | Southwestern Oklahoma State | 28 | Harding | 70 |
| October 22 | | Northeastern State | 47 | Arkansas-Monticello | 46 |
| October 22 | *‡ | East Central | 41 | Henderson State | 42 |
| October 22 | * | Southeastern Oklahoma State | 16 | Arkansas Tech | 28 |
| October 29 | * | East Central | 31 | Arkansas Tech | 16 |
| October 29 | | Southwestern Oklahoma State | 13 | Northeastern State | 42 |
| October 29 | * | Ouachita Baptist | 31 | Harding | 27 |
| October 29 | * | Southeastern Oklahoma State | 20 | Arkansas-Monticello | 24 |
| October 29 | | Henderson State | 3 | South Alabama | 28 |
| November 5 | | McKendree | 10 | Henderson State | 16 |
| November 5 | * | Arkansas Tech | 20 | Southwestern Oklahoma State | 23 |
| November 5 | * | Arkansas-Monticello | 28 | Southern Arkansas | 53 |
| November 5 | *‡ | Harding | 16 | East Central | 23 |
| November 5 | * | Ouachita Baptist | 21 | Southeastern Oklahoma State | 18 |
| November 12 | * | Henderson State | 41 | Ouachita Baptist | 36 |
| November 12 | * | Southeastern Oklahoma State | 9 | Harding | 16 |
| November 12 | * | Southern Arkansas | 6 | East Central | 49 |
| November 12 | * | Southwestern Oklahoma State | 21 | Arkansas-Monticello | 35 |
* – Conference Game β – Boomtown Classic (El Dorado, AR) ‡ – Overtime

== Women's soccer ==
Champion
East Central

After scoreless regulation and overtime periods, East Central defeated Ouachita Baptist 3–1 in penalty kicks to capture the inaugural Great American Conference women's soccer championship.

ECU, the conference's regular season champ as well, recorded successful penalty kicks from Laura McNab, Rachel Hudgins and Carla Rodriguez to capture the victory. Morgan Pitchford made the first penalty kick for OBU, but her team's next three shootout participants were unsuccessful in their attempts, setting up Rodriguez' game-winner.

- Offensive Player of the Year

Whitney Watts, East Central

- Defender of the Year

Kira Bertrand, Southwestern Oklahoma State

- Goalkeeper of the Year

Whitley Hoppe, Ouachita Baptist

- Freshman of the Year

Margaret Glutz, East Central

- Coach of the Year

Riley Bailey, East Central

- All-GAC 1st Team

F – Courtney Hailey, Southwestern Oklahoma State
F – Adriana Lucar, Harding
F – Whitney Watts, East Central
F – Beth Wendl, Ouachita Baptist
M – Josie Price, Southwestern Oklahoma State
M – Jessica Carbonara, Southwestern Oklahoma State
M – Lauren Hatch, Ouachita Baptist
M – Laura McNab, East Central
D – Carrie Lieblong, Ouachita Baptist
D – Hannah Hatcher, Harding
D – Margaret Glutz, East Central
D – Kira Bertrand, Southwestern Oklahoma State
GK – Whitley Hoppe, Ouachita Baptist

- All-GAC 2nd Team

F – Kelsey Visor, Southwestern Oklahoma State
F – Samantha Nunez, Southwestern Oklahoma State
F – Ashley Bradford, East Central
M – Ashley Royce, Harding
M – Katie Glutz, East Central
M – Samantha Rice, East Central
M – Miranda Lytle, Ouachita Baptist
D – Carla Rodriguez, East Central
D – Natalie Crosslin, Southwestern Oklahoma State
D – Chelsea Brandon, Harding
D – Mary Whisenhunt, Ouachita Baptist
GK – Adrianna Phininzy, East Central

- All-GAC Honorable Mention

M – Hannah Rudebusch, Southwestern Oklahoma State
D – Jessica Syswerda, East Central
D – Brie Munoz, Ouachita Baptist
GK – Chelsey Dodd, Southwestern Oklahoma State

=== Standings ===
| Team | Conference | | Overall | |
|---|---|---|---|---|
| East Central | 5–1–0 | .833 | 11–6–2 | .632 |
| Southwestern Oklahoma State | 4–2–0 | .667 | 6–11–2 | .368 |
| Ouachita Baptist | 3–3–0 | .500 | 8–9–1 | .472 |
| Harding | 0–6–0 | .000 | 4–13–1 | .250 |

=== Tournament ===
Friday-Sunday, November 4–6
Host: East Central University (Ada, OK)

Semifinals
1 | East Central | 6
4 | Harding | 0
2 | Southwestern Oklahoma State | 0
3 | Ouachita Baptist | 1

Finals
1 | East Central (p) | 0 (3)
3 | Ouachita Baptist | 0 (1)

- All-Tournament Team

F – Whitney Watts, East Central (Most Valuable Player)
F – Beth Wendl, Ouachita Baptist
F – Chelsea Brandon, Harding
F – Adriana Lucar, Harding
F – Kelsey Visor, Southwestern Oklahoma State
M – Laura McNab, East Central
M – Katie Glutz, East Central
M – Ashley McMahon, Southwestern Oklahoma State
M – Miranda Lytle, Ouachita Baptist
D – Margaret Glutz, East Central
GK – Adrianna Phininzy, East Central
GK – Whitley Hoppe, Ouachita Baptist

== Volleyball ==
Champion
Arkansas Tech

It is only fitting the inaugural Great American Conference volleyball tournament championship was decided in five sets. Arkansas Tech defeated Harding 3–2 to capture the tournament title to go along with the program's regular season championship.

It was ATU's third five set win over Harding this season. Final game scores were 20–25, 25–17, 25–16, 25–27, and 15–11.

- Player of the Year

Lunden Azuara, Southeastern Oklahoma State

- Newcomer of the Year

Ty Lindberg, Henderson State

- Freshman of the Year

Tiara Ewegbu, Southeastern Oklahoma State
Kalyn Helton, Harding

- Coach of the Year

Kristy Bayer, Arkansas Tech

- All-GAC 1st Team

OH – Lunden Azuara, Southeastern Oklahoma State
OH – Mollie Arnold, Harding
OH – Laura Farney, Arkansas Tech
MB – Sara Motsinger, Arkansas Tech
MB – LaKendra Sanders, Southwestern Oklahoma State
S – Amber Cerrillos, Arkansas Tech
L – Allison Frizzell, Ouachita Baptist

- All-GAC 2nd Team

OH – Noelle Cope, East Central
OH – Ty Lindberg, Henderson State
S – Shayla May, East Central
L – Sladjana Smiljanic, Southwestern Oklahoma State
MB – Tiara Iwegbu, Southeastern Oklahoma State
MB – Libby Merritt, Ouachita Baptist
OP – Courtney Smith, Southern Arkansas

- All-GAC Honorable Mention

MB – Brittany Ryan, Arkansas Tech
OH – Amy Kleypas, Arkansas-Monticello
OH – Kalyn Helton, Harding
MB – Alyssa Short, Harding
MB – Tatiana Booth, East Central
OH – Jordan White, Southern Arkansas
OP – Bailee Graham, Harding

=== Standings ===
| Team | Conference | | Overall | |
|---|---|---|---|---|
| Arkansas Tech | 16–0 | 1.000 | 35–4 | .897 |
| Harding | 13–3 | .813 | 25–8 | .758 |
| Southeastern Oklahoma State | 10–6 | .625 | 14–19 | .424 |
| Ouachita Baptist | 9–7 | .563 | 18–13 | .581 |
| East Central | 8–8 | .500 | 14–18 | .438 |
| Southern Arkansas | 7–9 | .438 | 17–16 | .515 |
| Southwestern Oklahoma State | 5–11 | .313 | 9–19 | .321 |
| Arkansas-Monticello | 4–12 | .250 | 7–23 | .233 |
| Henderson State | 0–16 | .000 | 4–28 | .125 |

=== Tournament ===
Friday-Saturday, November 11–12
Host: Arkansas Tech University (Russellville, AR)

Quarterfinals
1 | Arkansas Tech | 3
8 | Arkansas-Monticello | 0
4 | Ouachita Baptist | 1
5 | East Central | 3
2 | Harding | 3
7 | Southwestern Oklahoma State | 0
3 | Southeastern Oklahoma State | 1
6 | Southern Arkansas | 3

Semifinals
1 | Arkansas Tech | 3
5 | East Central | 1
3 | Harding | 3
7 | Southern Arkansas | 0

Finals
1 | Arkansas Tech | 3
3 | Harding | 2

- All-Tournament Team

L – Brennae Benda, Arkansas Tech (Most Valuable Player)
OH – Laura Farney, Arkansas Tech
OP – Thabata Galvao, Arkansas Tech
OH – Mollie Arnold, Harding
MB – Alyssa Short, Harding
OH – Jordan White, Southern Arkansas
OH – Noelle Cope, East Central

== Men's basketball ==
Champion
Arkansas Tech

Top-seeded and nationally ranked No. 21 Arkansas Tech captured the inaugural Great American Conference men's basketball championship by defeating No. 7 seed Southwestern Oklahoma State by a final score of 69–58.

With the win over SWOSU, ATU has now been the victor of three of its past four conference championship tournaments. Arkansas Tech was Gulf South Conference champions in 2009 and 2010.

- Player of the Year

Johnie Davis, Arkansas Tech

- Defender of the Year

Thomas Davis, Southwestern Oklahoma State

- Newcomer of the Year

Denzel Lyles, Henderson State

- Freshman of the Year

Antonio Worthy, Southeastern Oklahoma State

- Coach of the Year

Doug Karleskint, Arkansas Tech

- All-GAC 1st Team

G – Johnie Davis, Arkansas Tech
G – LA Farmer, Arkansas-Monticello
G – Denzel Lyles, Henderson State
C – Zach Roddenberry, Harding
G – Sergio Crowe, Arkansas-Monticello

- All-GAC 2nd Team

F – Thomas Davis, Southwestern Oklahoma State
G – Austin Mitchell, Ouachita Baptist
G – Jared Williamson, Arkansas Tech
G – Kori Forge, Arkansas-Monticello
G – Jonathan Fitzergald, Henderson State

- All-GAC Honorable Mention

G – Zac Downing, Southeastern Oklahoma State
C – Will Paul, Arkansas Tech
F – Ricardo Hall, Arkansas-Monticello
G – Nigel Ramsey, Ouachita Baptist
F – Andrew Ensley, Henderson State

=== Standings ===
| Team | Conference | | Overall | |
|---|---|---|---|---|
| Arkansas Tech | 13–3 | .813 | 26–6 | .813 |
| Henderson State | 11–5 | .688 | 16–11 | .593 |
| Arkansas-Monticello | 10–6 | .625 | 21–9 | .700 |
| Ouachita Baptist | 8–8 | .500 | 16–12 | .571 |
| Southeastern Oklahoma State | 8–8 | .500 | 12–17 | .414 |
| Harding | 8–8 | .500 | 13–14 | .481 |
| Southwestern Oklahoma State | 6–10 | .375 | 17–12 | .586 |
| Southern Arkansas | 6–10 | .375 | 13–16 | .448 |
| East Central | 2–14 | .125 | 5–21 | .192 |

=== Tournament ===
Thursday-Sunday, March 1–4
Host: Bartlesville Sports Commission (Bartlesville, OK)

Quarterfinals
1 | Arkansas Tech | 54
8 | Southern Arkansas | 53
4 | Ouachita Baptist | 85
5 | Southeastern Oklahoma State | 65
2 | Henderson State | 60
7 | Southwestern Oklahoma State | 81
3 | Arkansas-Monticello | 58
6 | Harding | 54

Semifinals
1 | Arkansas Tech | 67
4 | Ouachita Baptist | 62
6 | Southwestern Oklahoma State | 79
2 | Arkansas-Monticello | 76

Finals
1 | Arkansas Tech | 69
6 | Southwestern Oklahoma State | 58

- All-Tournament Team

G – Jared Williamson, Arkansas Tech (Most Valuable Player)
G – Johnie Davis, Arkansas Tech
G – Chase Elliott, Southwestern Oklahoma State
G – Dominick Cornelius, Southwestern Oklahoma State
F – Michael Morris, Ouachita Baptist
G – Nigel Ramsey, Ouachita Baptist
F – Zach Roddenberry, Harding
G – LA Farmer, Arkansas-Monticello

== Women's basketball ==
Champion
Southwestern Oklahoma State

No. 2 seed Southwestern Oklahoma State captured the inaugural Great American Conference women's basketball tournament championship with a 69–58 win over No. 4 seed Harding.

With the win over Harding, SWOSU won its first post-season tournament championship since 1998 and finished the season on a seven-game winning streak.

- Player of the Year

Darcie Dick, Southwestern Oklahoma State

- Defender of the Year

Roselis Silva, Arkansas Tech

- Newcomer of the Year

Darcie Dick, Southwestern Oklahoma State

- Freshman of the Year

Montana Lewis, Harding

- Coach of the Year

Kelsi Musick, Southwestern Oklahoma State

- All-GAC 1st Team

G – Darcie Dick, Southwestern Oklahoma State
G – Roselis Silva, Arkansas Tech
F – Natalia Santos, Arkansas Tech
C – Sumiya Darden, Southwestern Oklahoma State
F – Kristen Celsor, Harding

- All-GAC 2nd Team

G/F – Katie Horsman, Arkansas Tech
G – Sierra Rollins, Harding
G – Cheree Freeman, Henderson State
G – Nikki Nester, Southeastern Oklahoma State
G – Domino Miller, Ouachita Baptist

- All-GAC Honorable Mention

G – Alex Hart, Arkansas-Monticello
G – Nashia James, Ouachita Baptist
G – A'Laeshia Adams, Ouachita Baptist
G – Chelsea Johnson, Arkansas-Monticello
G – SaRaya Oyler, Southwestern Oklahoma State

=== Standings ===
| Team | Conference | | Overall | |
|---|---|---|---|---|
| Arkansas Tech | 13–3 | .813 | 22–4 | .846 |
| Southwestern Oklahoma State | 12–4 | .750 | 20–9 | .690 |
| Ouachita Baptist | 10–6 | .625 | 18–10 | .643 |
| Harding | 9–7 | .563 | 18–11 | .621 |
| Henderson State | 7–9 | .438 | 14–13 | .519 |
| Arkansas-Monticello | 7–9 | .438 | 11–16 | .407 |
| East Central | 6–10 | .375 | 8–19 | .296 |
| Southeastern Oklahoma State | 6–10 | .375 | 11–17 | .393 |
| Southern Arkansas | 2–14 | .125 | 2–24 | .077 |

=== Tournament ===
Thursday-Sunday, March 1–4
Host: Bartlesville Sports Commission (Bartlesville, OK)

Quarterfinals
1 | Arkansas Tech | 72
8 | Southeastern Oklahoma State | 84
4 | Harding | 78
5 | Henderson State | 52
2 | Southwestern Oklahoma State | 81
7 | East Central | 46
3 | Ouachita Baptist | 74
6 | Arkansas-Monticello | 72

Semifinals
8 | Southeastern Oklahoma State | 54
4 | Harding | 62
3 | Southwestern Oklahoma State | 83
2 | Ouachita Baptist | 67

Finals
4 | Harding | 58
3 | Southwestern Oklahoma State | 69

- All-Tournament Team

G – Darcie Dick, Southwestern Oklahoma State (Most Valuable Player)
C – Sumiya Darden, Southwestern Oklahoma State
G – Arielle Saunders, Harding
G – Cherilyn McMenamy, Harding
G – A'Laeshia Adams, Ouachita Baptist
G – Bailey Welch, Southeastern Oklahoma State
F – Ashley Hobbs, Southeastern Oklahoma State
G – Roselis Silva, Arkansas Tech

== Baseball ==
Champion
Southern Arkansas

Southern Arkansas' Jason Dahl sent a towering fly ball over the right-center field fence in the bottom of the 11th inning to give his team the title with a 4–3 victory over Ouachita Baptist in the finals of the inaugural Great American Conference championship tournament. Dahl was also responsible for forcing the game into extra innings after hitting an RBI double down the right field line in the bottom of the ninth.

Ouachita Baptist defeated Southern Arkansas by the same score in the first game of the day. SAU rallied in the ninth inning to score one run on an RBI groundout from Rafael Thomas, but Southern Arkansas left two runners on base when Ryan Dardenne grounded out to the pitcher to force the deciding second game.

- Player of the Year

Jonathan Finnegan, Arkansas Tech

- Pitcher of the Year

Doug Shields, Southern Arkansas

- Freshman of the Year

Ryan Dardenne, Southern Arkansas

- Coach of the Year

Steve Browning, Southern Arkansas

- All-GAC 1st Team

SP – Doug Shields, Southern Arkansas
SP – James Baune, Southern Arkansas
SP – Brandon Marris, Southeastern Oklahoma State
SP – Brittain Diamond, Henderson State
RP – Cameron Mann, Southeastern Oklahoma State
C – Landon Sullins, Arkansas Tech
1B – Jonathan Finnegan, Arkansas Tech
2B – Andre Yates, Southwestern Oklahoma State
3B – Jeremy Soliday, Southwestern Oklahoma State
3B – Brady Capshaw, Southern Arkansas
SS – Trey Buck, Southern Arkansas
OF – Jason Dahl, Southern Arkansas
OF – Rafael Thomas, Southern Arkansas
OF – Blake Gentry, Southeastern Oklahoma State
OF – Josh Salmon, Henderson State
DH – Rick Hepworth, East Central
UT – Adam Ussery, Henderson State

- All-GAC 2nd Team

SP – Brice Williams, Southeastern Oklahoma State
SP – Aaron Luchterhand, Arkansas Tech
SP – Cole Stephens, Southwestern Oklahoma State
SP – Ryan Westover, Ouachita Baptist
RP – Justin Thomas, Southern Arkansas
C – Tom Ward, Ouachita Baptist
1B – David Allday, Southern Arkansas
2B – Taylor Eaves, Arkansas-Monticello
3B – Nate Wilder, Arkansas Tech
SS – Kevin Phillips, Southeastern Oklahoma State
OF – Keegan Ghidotti, Ouachita Baptist
OF – Madison Beaird, Arkansas Tech
OF – Peter Bako, Southeastern Oklahoma State
OF – Danny Loya, Arkansas-Monticello
DH – Thomas Biocic, Arkansas Tech
UT – Chris Reese, Arkansas Tech

- All-GAC Honorable Mention

SP – Lucas Waddell, Harding
SP – Zak Anstine, Arkansas Tech
SP – Nathan Eller, Henderson State
SP – Shane Martin, Southwestern Oklahoma State
RP – Zac Treece, Ouachita Baptist
C – Ryan Dardenne, Southern Arkansas
1B – Brock Green, Ouachita Baptist
3B – Josh Chism, Arkansas-Monticello
SS – Christian Gallegos, Arkansas-Monticello
OF – Kyle Atkins, Harding
OF – Conner Brackhahn, Henderson State
OF – Gilbert Guardado, East Central
OF – Ethan Gold, East Central
DH – McCrae Jones, Ouachita Baptist
UT – Parker Norris, Ouachita Baptist

=== Standings ===
| Team | Conference | | Overall | |
|---|---|---|---|---|
| Southern Arkansas | 17–7 | .708 | 37–17 | .685 |
| Southeastern Oklahoma State | 16–8 | .667 | 34–17 | .667 |
| Southwestern Oklahoma State | 14–10 | .583 | 27–19 | .587 |
| Arkansas Tech | 13–11 | .542 | 26–27 | .491 |
| Ouachita Baptist | 12–12 | .500 | 30–26 | .536 |
| Henderson State | 11–13 | .458 | 23–27 | .460 |
| East Central | 10–13 | .435 | 26–23 | .531 |
| Arkansas-Monticello | 7–16 | .304 | 18–26 | .409 |
| Harding | 7–17 | .292 | 24–25 | .490 |

=== Tournament ===
Friday-Monday, May 4–7
Host: David Allen Memorial Ballpark (Enid, OK)

First round
1 | Southern Arkansas | 7
6 | Henderson State | 6
2 | Southeastern Oklahoma State | 1
5 | Ouachita Baptist | 0
3 | Southwestern Oklahoma State | 4
4 | Arkansas Tech | 8^{A}

Second round
Southern Arkansas | 6
Southwestern Oklahoma State | 4
Southeastern Oklahoma State | 7
Arkansas Tech | 4
Henderson State | 3
Ouachita Baptist | 5

Third round
Southern Arkansas | 15
Southeastern Oklahoma State | 11
Arkansas Tech | 7
Ouachita Baptist | 13

Semifinals
Southeastern Oklahoma State | 4
Ouachita Baptist | 5

Final
Southern Arkansas | 3 | 4^{A}
Ouachita Baptist | 4 | 3

^{A} 11 innings

- All-Tournament Team

P – Justin Thomas, Southern Arkansas (Most Valuable Player)
SS – Trey Buck, Southern Arkansas
OF – Jason Dahl, Southern Arkansas
OF – Gavin McCauley, Southern Arkansas
3B – Brady Capshaw, Southern Arkansas
C – Tom Ward, Ouachita Baptist
2B – Duncan Collins, Ouachita Baptist
P – Ryan Westover, Ouachita Baptist
OF – Keegan Ghidotti, Ouachita Baptist
P – Zac Treece, Ouachita Baptist
2B – Spencer Barnett, Southeastern Oklahoma State
P – Brandon Marris, Southeastern Oklahoma State
P – Levi Lewis, Southeastern Oklahoma State
2B – Cesar Abreu, Arkansas Tech
1B – Thomas Biocic, Arkansas Tech

== Men's golf ==
Champion
Team – Southwestern Oklahoma State
Individual – Matt Jennings, Henderson State

Southwestern Oklahoma State claimed the inaugural Great American Conference men's golf championship after ending the final round five strokes ahead of eventual runner-up Arkansas Tech.

SWOSU turned in its highest team total of the three round tournament in the final round with a 306 to give the team a final score of 898. Arkansas Tech shot a 300 as a team in the final round to increase its final total to 903. ATU bettered its team score by one stroke in each round of the event, but it was not enough to overcome SWOSU's first and second round scores of 297 and 295.

The final round needed a sudden-victory playoff to decide the individual champion. HSU's Matt Jennings won the first playoff hole over ATU's Jack Garrett by two strokes to take first place. Garrett shot a 74 in the final 18 holes, while Jennings turned in a 77 to give the pair a regulation three round total of 219 each.

Jennings becomes HSU's first individual conference champion in men's golf since the institution joined the NCAA Division II ranks in 1994.

- Player of the Year

Jack Garrett, Arkansas Tech

- Freshman of the Year

Brandon Clark, Harding

- Coach of the Year

Luke Calcatera, Arkansas Tech

- All-GAC 1st Team

Jack Garrett, Arkansas Tech
Matt Jennings, Henderson State
Parker Hale, Arkansas Tech
Travis Chrietzberg, Southern Arkansas
Jeff Weisheit, East Central

- All-GAC 2nd Team

Graham Rucker, Arkansas Tech
Jared Black, Henderson State
Jordan Hudson, Southwestern Oklahoma State
Jeff Hunter, Southeastern Oklahoma State
Robert Perry, Southeastern Oklahoma State

- All-GAC Honorable Mention

Slade Hames, Arkansas Tech
Luka Karaula, Southwestern Oklahoma State
Brandon Clark, Harding
Dakota Robbins, East Central
Taylor Howie, Southwestern Oklahoma State

=== Championships ===
Sunday-Tuesday, April 15–17
Host: Hot Springs Country Club (Hot Springs, AR)

| Team | | | | Individual (Top Ten) | | | |
| 1 | Southwestern Oklahoma State | 297 – 295 – 306 | 898 | 1 | Matt Jennings (HSU)^{‡} | 73 – 69 – 77 | 219 |
| 2 | Arkansas Tech | 302 – 301 – 300 | 903 | 2 | Jack Garrett (ATU) | 73 – 72 – 74 | 219 |
| 3 | Henderson State | 305 – 302 – 307 | 914 | 3 | Wouter MyBurgh (SWOSU) | 73 – 73 – 76 | 222 |
| 4 | East Central | 302 – 313 – 303 | 918 | 4 | Jeff Weisheit (ECU) | 70 – 77 – 77 | 224 |
| 5 | Harding | 308 – 304 – 307 | 919 | 5 | Jordan Hudson (SWOSU) | 74 – 76 – 75 | 225 |
| 6 | Southeastern Oklahoma State | 318 – 308 – 302 | 928 | 6 | Brandon Clark (HU) | 74 – 75 – 77 | 226 |
| 7 | Southern Arkansas | 314 – 316 – 311 | 941 | 7 | Vincent Strong (SWOSU) | 75 – 75 – 77 | 227 |
| 8 | Arkansas-Monticello | 320 – 316 – 327 | 963 | 7 | Taylor Howie (SWOSU) | 75 – 73 – 79 | 227 |
| 9 | Ouachita Baptist | 333 – 326 – 319 | 978 | 7 | Bryeson Lance (ECU) | 73 – 79 – 75 | 227 |
| | | | | 10 | Jason Purdy (ATU) | 76 – 79 – 73 | 228 |
^{‡} Playoff Winner

- All-Tournament Team

Matt Jennings, Henderson State
Jack Garrett, Arkansas Tech
Wouter MyBurgh, Southwestern Oklahoma State
Jeff Weisheit, East Central
Jordan Hudson, Southwestern Oklahoma State
Brandon Clark, Harding

== Women's golf ==
Champion
Team – Harding
Individual – Rebecka Surtevall, Arkansas Tech

Harding held off a late push from eventual runner-up Arkansas Tech to capture the inaugural Great American Conference women's golf championship by a final margin of 11 strokes.

Harding shot a 320 in the final round to give the team a three round total of 956. Arkansas Tech finished second with a three round total of 967 after posting the best team score of the event for a single round with a 315 in the final 18 holes.

ATU's final round was highlighted by individual champion Rebecka Surtevall, who shot a 75 to give her a three-day total of 232, one stroke ahead of individual runner-up Becca Godman from Harding, who entered the final 18 holes with a one stroke advantage. Surtevall's third round score of 75 was the top individual single round score of the event.

- Player of the Year

Rebecka Surtevall, Arkansas Tech

- Freshman of the Year

Rebecka Surtevall, Arkansas Tech

- Coach of the Year

Amy White, Arkansas Tech

- All-GAC 1st Team

Rebecka Surtevall, Arkansas Tech
Emily Plyler, Harding
Whitley Patterson, Southern Arkansas
Brittany Marquez, Harding
Elizabeth Sweetnam, Arkansas Tech

- All-GAC 2nd Team

Haley Hise, Southwestern Oklahoma State
Niki Possage, Arkansas Tech
Rachel Harmon, Henderson State
So-Yun Kim, Harding
Julie Robinson, Henderson State

- All-GAC Honorable Mention

Taylor Kline, Arkansas Tech
Lindsey Lunceford, East Central

=== Championships ===
Sunday-Tuesday, April 15–17
Host: Hot Springs Country Club (Hot Springs, AR)

| Team | | | | Individual (Top Ten) | | | |
| 1 | Harding | 318 – 318 – 320 | 956 | 1 | Rebecka Surtevall (ATU) | 80 – 77 – 75 | 232 |
| 2 | Arkansas Tech | 330 – 322 – 315 | 967 | 2 | Becca Godman (HU) | 79 – 77 – 77 | 233 |
| 3 | Southwestern Oklahoma State | 341 – 325 – 325 | 991 | 3 | Emily Plyler (HU) | 79 – 83 – 77 | 239 |
| 4 | Henderson State | 328 – 332 – 339 | 999 | 3 | Taylor Kline (ATU) | 83 – 77 – 79 | 239 |
| 5 | East Central | 350 – 341 – 331 | 1022 | 5 | Brittany Marquez (HU) | 82 – 75 – 83 | 240 |
| 6 | Ouachita Baptist | 386 – 377 – 385 | 1148 | 6 | Julie Robinson (HSU) | 81 – 82 – 79 | 242 |
| 7 | Arkansas-Monticello | 406 – 421 – 406 | 1233 | 7 | Soyun Kim (HU) | 78 – 83 – 83 | 244 |
| 8 | Southern Arkansas | 427 – 425 – 409 | 1261 | 7 | Elizabeth Sweetnam (ATU) | 83 – 82 – 79 | 244 |
| | | | | 7 | Margaret Musser (SWOSU) | 87 – 81 – 76 | 244 |
| | | | | 10 | Whitley Patterson (SAU) | 77 – 85 – 84 | 246 |

- All-Tournament Team

Rebecka Surtevall, Arkansas Tech
Becca Godman, Harding
Emily Plyler, Harding
Taylor Kline, Arkansas Tech
Brittany Marquez, Harding

== Softball ==
Champion
Arkansas-Monticello

No. 1 seed Arkansas-Monticello defeated No. 2 seed Southeastern Oklahoma State 9–2 to secure the inaugural Great American Conference softball championship tournament title.

It is UAM's first overall conference tournament championship in its 17-year history.

- Player of the Year

Emily Kennemer, East Central

- Pitcher of the Year

Kayla Jackson, Arkansas-Monticello

- Newcomer of the Year

Ali Manship, East Central

- Freshman of the Year

Sara Matthews, Arkansas-Monticello

- Coach of the Year

Alvy Early, Arkansas-Monticello

- All-GAC 1st Team

P – Kayla Jackson, Arkansas-Monticello
P – Audra Rhudy, Southeastern Oklahoma State
P – Katrina Johnson, Southwestern Oklahoma State
C – Courtney Moore, Southeastern Oklahoma State
1B – Emily Kennemer, East Central
2B – Lindsey Lacy, Southeastern Oklahoma State
3B – Sara Matthews, Arkansas-Monticello
SS – Katie Campbell, Southeastern Oklahoma State
OF – Kristyn Shawver, Southwestern Oklahoma State
OF – Ali Manship, East Central
OF – Maggie Sands, Arkansas-Monticello
DP/UT – Cami Correa, East Central

- All-GAC 2nd Team

P – Katie Raines, Southwestern Oklahoma State
P – Hanna Gill, Southern Arkansas
P – Victoria Huie, Arkansas Tech
C – Desiree Nordie, East Central
1B – Kayla Jackson, Arkansas-Monticello
2B – Ashley Ray, Henderson State
3B – Sam Vrska, Southeastern Oklahoma State
SS – Johnna Smith, Southwestern Oklahoma State
SS – Jennifer Hickman, Arkansas-Monticello
OF – Amy Halter, Henderson State
OF – Paige Priest, Southeastern Oklahoma State
OF – Courtne St. Clair, Southeastern Oklahoma State
DP/UT – Taylor Russell, Arkansas-Monticello

- All-GAC Honorable Mention

P – Rayn House, Ouachita Baptist
P – Kelsey Reding, Southeastern Oklahoma State
P – Melissa Decker, Henderson State
C – Brittany Eitel, Arkansas-Monticello
C – Amber Klug, Henderson State
1B – Sarah Gipson, Henderson State
1B – Alexis Johns, Ouachita Baptist
2B – Chelsea Patterson, East Central
3B – Hayley Hudson, Arkansas Tech
OF – Katey Gorsage, Henderson State
OF – Megan Askew, Ouachita Baptist
OF – Beth Johnson, Arkansas-Monticello
DP/UT – Whitney Hamilton, Southeastern Oklahoma State

=== Standings ===
| Team | Conference | | Overall | |
|---|---|---|---|---|
| Arkansas-Monticello | 21–5 | .808 | 40–14 | .741 |
| Southeastern Oklahoma State | 22–6 | .786 | 40–16 | .714 |
| East Central | 15–11 | .577 | 27–18 | .600 |
| Southwestern Oklahoma State | 14–14 | .500 | 32–20 | .615 |
| Henderson State | 11–17 | .393 | 20–30 | .400 |
| Southern Arkansas | 11–17 | .393 | 26–33 | .441 |
| Arkansas Tech | 8–18 | .308 | 16–31 | .340 |
| Ouachita Baptist | 6–20 | .231 | 18–31 | .367 |

=== Tournament ===
Thursday-Saturday, April 26–28
Host: Bentonville Visitors and Convention Bureau (Bentonville, AR)

Upper round 1 | Upper round 2 | Upper final | Final
Arkansas-Monticello | 9^{A}
Ouachita Baptist | 1
Arkansas-Monticello | 1
Southwestern Oklahoma State | 0
Southwestern Oklahoma State | 5
Henderson State | 1
Arkansas-Monticello | 8^{A}
Southern Arkansas | 0
Southeastern Oklahoma State | 8
Arkansas Tech | 2
Southeastern Oklahoma State | 0
Southern Arkansas | 2^{C}
East Central | 0
Southern Arkansas | 9^{B} | Arkansas-Monticello | 9 | x
Southeastern Oklahoma State | 2 | x
Lower round 1 | Lower round 2 | Lower round 3 | Lower final
Southeastern Oklahoma State | 4
Ouachita Baptist | 0 | Henderson State | 2 | Southern Arkansas | 1
Henderson State | 12^{B} | Southeastern Oklahoma State | 1 | Southeastern Oklahoma State | 6
Southwestern Oklahoma State | 0
Southwestern Oklahoma State | 6
Arkansas Tech | 2 | Arkansas Tech | 1
East Central | 1

^{A} 5 Innings
^{B} 6 Innings
^{C} 9 Innings

- All-Tournament Team

P – Kayla Jackson, Arkansas-Monticello (Most Valuable Player)
SS – Jennifer Hickman, Arkansas-Monticello
OF – Maggie Sands, Arkansas-Monticello
OF – Katie Bowman, Arkansas-Monticello
2B – Summer Huddleston, Arkansas-Monticello
3B – Sam Vrska, Southeastern Oklahoma State
2B – Lindsey Lacy, Southeastern Oklahoma State
P – Audra Rhudy, Southeastern Oklahoma State
DP – Whitney Hamilton, Southeastern Oklahoma State
P – Hanna Gill, Southern Arkansas
SS – Taelor Wheeler, Southern Arkansas
P – Katrina Johnson, Southwestern Oklahoma State
OF – Katey Gorsage, Henderson State
C – Amber Klug, Henderson State

== Men's tennis ==
Champion
Ouachita Baptist

No. 1 seed and host Ouachita Baptist defeated No. 2 seed East Central by a final score of 5–1 on Saturday to capture the inaugural Great American Conference men's tennis championship tournament title.

After going 2–1 in doubles play, OBU's Helge Knuth, Marko Boskovic and Ramon Abaitua all recorded singles victories to give OBU the conference's tournament championship. The Tigers also captured the league's inaugural regular season title, going 3–0.

- Player of the Year

Kittibodee Singnil, Harding

- Newcomer of the Year

Luca Radulovic, Southeastern Oklahoma State

- Freshman of the Year

Kittibodee Singnil, Harding

- Coach of the Year

Craig Ward, Ouachita Baptist

- All-GAC Team

Kittibodee Singnil, Harding
Helge Knuth, Ouachita Baptist
Marko Boskovic, Ouachita Baptist
Stefan Stein, East Central
Luca Radulovic, Southeastern Oklahoma State
Kenny Brasil, Ouachita Baptist
Julian Caminos, East Central
Adam Edwards, Harding

=== Standings ===
| Team | Conference | | Overall | |
|---|---|---|---|---|
| Ouachita Baptist | 3–0 | 1.000 | 16–7 | .696 |
| East Central | 2–1 | .667 | 8–7 | .533 |
| Southeastern Oklahoma State | 1–2 | .333 | 7–9 | .438 |
| Harding | 0–3 | .000 | 20–4 | .833 |

=== Tournament ===
Friday-Saturday, April 20–22
Host: Ouachita Baptist University (Arkadelphia, AR)

Semifinals
1 | Ouachita Baptist | 5
4 | Harding | 0
2 | East Central | 5
3 | Southeastern Oklahoma State | 1

Finals
1 | Ouachita Baptist | 5
2 | East Central | 1

== Women's tennis ==
Champion
Arkansas Tech

No. 1 seed Arkansas Tech followed its regular season championship by winning the inaugural Great American Conference women's tennis championship tournament with a 5–0 win over No. 3 seed East Central.

The Golden Suns' 3–0 performance in doubles play was highlighted by an 8–0 win for Maria Aleman and Rachel Stevens over ECU's Bernardita Muscillo and Kristen Clubb. In singles play, ATU's Nina Greenway picked up a 6–1, 6–0 victory over Kaitlin Threat in the sixth position, while Rachel Stevens picked up a default win over Auriele Rodriguez in the second set due to injury.

- Player of the Year

Mariel Alvarez, Arkansas Tech

- Newcomer of the Year

Maria Moreno, Harding

- Freshman of the Year

Aida Castany, Arkansas Tech

- Coach of the Year

Abby Davis, Arkansas Tech

- All-GAC 1st Team

Mariel Alvarez, Arkansas Tech
Ling Chan, Harding
Marta Valles, East Central
Akanesi Fa, Arkansas Tech
Benyapa Phumtip, Harding
Bernardita Muscillo, East Central
Maria Aleman, Arkansas Tech
Kourtney Chumbley, Ouachita Baptist

- All-GAC 2nd Team

Rachel Stevens, Arkansas Tech
Fabiola Juarez, Southeastern Oklahoma State
Sabina Mardarenko, Southeastern Oklahoma State
Chelsea Hunt, Harding
Eli Dignard, East Central
Kristen Clubb, East Central
Kristine Bodine, Ouachita Baptist

=== Standings ===
| Team | Conference | | Overall | |
|---|---|---|---|---|
| Arkansas Tech | 6–0 | 1.000 | 17–5 | .773 |
| Harding | 5–1 | .833 | 20–8 | .714 |
| East Central | 4–2 | .667 | 6–12 | .333 |
| Southeastern Oklahoma State | 3–3 | .500 | 8–9 | .471 |
| Ouachita Baptist | 2–4 | .333 | 4–14 | .222 |
| Henderson State | 1–5 | .167 | 2–14 | .125 |
| Southern Arkansas | 0–6 | .000 | 1–13 | .071 |

=== Tournament ===
Friday-Saturday, April 20–22
Host: Ouachita Baptist University (Arkadelphia, AR)

Quarterfinals
3 | East Central | 5
6 | Henderson State | 0
2 | Harding | 5
7 | Southern Arkansas | 0
4 | Southeastern Oklahoma State | 5
5 | Ouachita Baptist | 2

Semifinals
3 | East Central | 5
2 | Harding | 2
4 | Southeastern Oklahoma State | 0
1 | Arkansas Tech | 5

Finals
3 | East Central | 0
1 | Arkansas Tech | 5
