= Battle of the Timberlands =

American college football rivalry

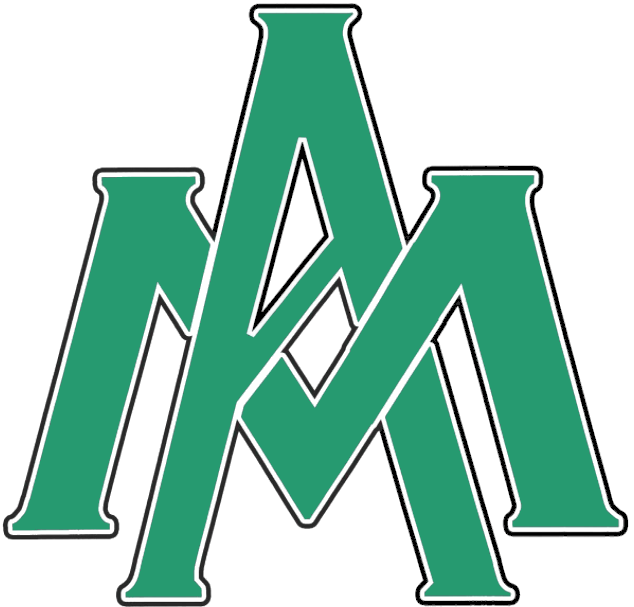
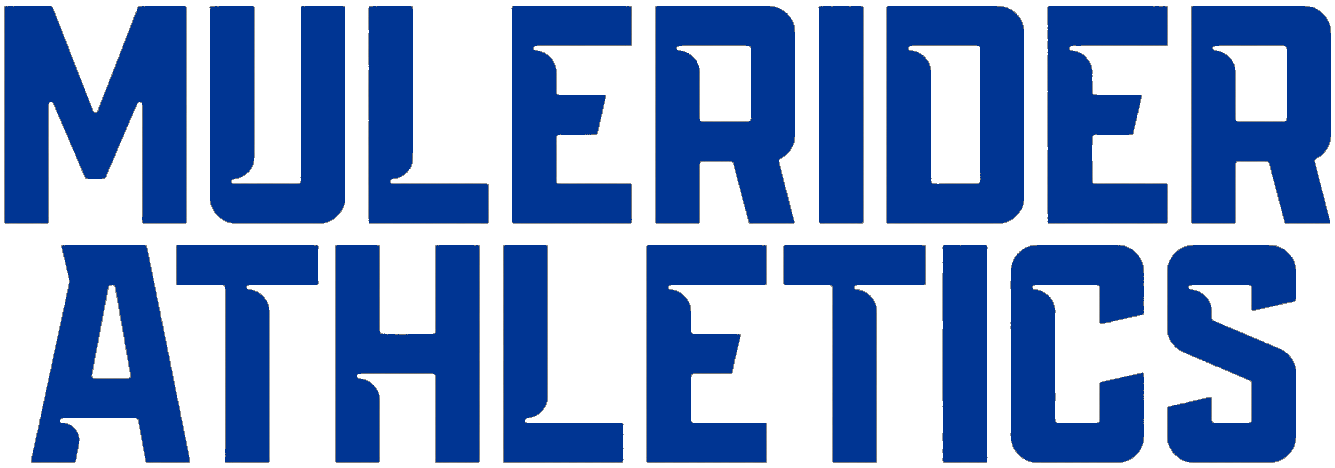
- Arkansas–Monticello Boll Weevils Southern Arkansas Muleriders
- Sport: Football
- First meeting: November 27, 1913; Arkansas–Monticello, 26–0
- Latest meeting: November 14, 2026; Arkansas–Monticello, 49–34
- Next meeting: 2027

Statistics
- Total meetings: 101
- All-time series: Southern Arkansas leads, 62–38–1 (.619) (Note: In 1999, Arkansas–Monticello initially won the game but later had to forfeit due to the use of an ineligible player.)
- Largest victory: Southern Arkansas, 91–0 (1925)
- Longest win streak: Southern Arkansas, 11 (1967–1977)
- Current win streak: Arkansas–Monticello, 1 (2026–present)

Locations in Arkansas

The Battle of the Timberlands is an annual college football rivalry game between the Arkansas–Monticello Boll Weevils of the University of Arkansas at Monticello and the Southern Arkansas Muleriders of the Southern Arkansas University. The game became known as the "Battle of the Timberlands" in 2012 when a traveling trophy for the contest was created (both schools are located in southern Arkansas, which has a large forest products industry).

The rivalry between the two schools dates back to 1913. Both schools are currently members of the Great American Conference. Through the 100 games played, Southern Arkansas leads the series 62–38–1.

== Game results ==
Arkansas–Monticello victories	Southern Arkansas victories	Tie games

No.	Date	Location	Winner	Score
1	November 21, 1913	Magnolia, AR	Arkansas–Monticello	26–0
2	November 9, 1914	Monticello, AR	Arkansas–Monticello	47–21
3	November 27, 1915	Magnolia, AR	Southern Arkansas	7–0
4	November 4, 1916	Monticello, AR	Arkansas–Monticello	27–0
5	November 29, 1917	Magnolia, AR	Arkansas–Monticello	24–0
6	October 18, 1919	Magnolia, AR	Southern Arkansas	46–0
7	November 11, 1921	Magnolia, AR	Southern Arkansas	13–7
8	November 9, 1923	Monticello, AR	Arkansas–Monticello	13–6
9	November 27, 1924	Monticello, AR	Arkansas–Monticello	46–0
10	November 25, 1925	Magnolia, AR	Southern Arkansas	91–0
11	November 25, 1926	Monticello, AR	Southern Arkansas	26–0
12	November 24, 1927	Monticello, AR	Southern Arkansas	7–0
13	November 29, 1928	Monticello, AR	Arkansas–Monticello	7–0
14	November 28, 1929	Magnolia, AR	Southern Arkansas	32–6
15	November 27, 1930	Monticello, AR	Arkansas–Monticello	6–0
16	November 26, 1931	Magnolia, AR	Arkansas–Monticello	12–0
17	November 24, 1932	Monticello, AR	Arkansas–Monticello	6–0
18	November 29, 1933	El Dorado, AR	Tie	0–0
19	November 29, 1934	El Dorado, AR	Southern Arkansas	7–6
20	November 28, 1935	Magnolia, AR	Southern Arkansas	7–0
21	November 26, 1936	Monticello, AR	Arkansas–Monticello	13–0
22	November 27, 1941	Monticello, AR	Southern Arkansas	25–7
23	November 29, 1946	El Dorado, AR	Southern Arkansas	21–0
24	November 28, 1947	El Dorado, AR	Southern Arkansas	33–6
25	November 25, 1948	Monticello, AR	Southern Arkansas	7–6
26	November 24, 1949	Magnolia, AR	Arkansas–Monticello	26–14
27	November 23, 1950	Monticello, AR	Southern Arkansas	21–15
28	November 22, 1951	Magnolia, AR	Southern Arkansas	19–7
29	November 27, 1952	Monticello, AR	Southern Arkansas	21–7
30	November 26, 1953	Magnolia, AR	Arkansas–Monticello	31–14
31	November 25, 1954	Monticello, AR	Southern Arkansas	13–6
32	November 24, 1955	Magnolia, AR	Southern Arkansas	12–7
33	November 28, 1957	Monticello, AR	Arkansas–Monticello	9–6
34	November 27, 1958	Magnolia, AR	Arkansas–Monticello	21–6
35	November 21, 1959	Monticello, AR	Southern Arkansas	13–6
36	November 19, 1960	Magnolia, AR	Southern Arkansas	48–13
37	November 18, 1961	Monticello, AR	Southern Arkansas	35–13
38	November 17, 1962	Magnolia, AR	Arkansas–Monticello	20–6
39	November 16, 1963	Monticello, AR	Arkansas–Monticello	28–0
40	November 14, 1964	Magnolia, AR	Arkansas–Monticello	14–13
41	November 13, 1965	Monticello, AR	Arkansas–Monticello	37–0
42	November 19, 1966	Magnolia, AR	Arkansas–Monticello	40–20
43	November 18, 1967	Monticello, AR	Southern Arkansas	21–19
44	November 23, 1968	Magnolia, AR	Southern Arkansas	21–13
45	November 21, 1969	Monticello, AR	Southern Arkansas	8–7
46	November 21, 1970	Monticello, AR	Southern Arkansas	7–0
47	November 20, 1971	Monticello, AR	Southern Arkansas	49–18
48	November 18, 1972	Magnolia, AR	Southern Arkansas	43–0
49	November 17, 1973	Monticello, AR	Southern Arkansas	35–20
50	November 23, 1974	Magnolia, AR	Southern Arkansas	14–0
51	November 22, 1975	Monticello, AR	Southern Arkansas	25–0

No.	Date	Location	Winner	Score
52	November 20, 1976	Magnolia, AR	Southern Arkansas	42–24
53	November 19, 1977	Monticello, AR	Southern Arkansas	14–9
54	November 18, 1978	Monticello, AR	Arkansas–Monticello	51–13
55	November 17, 1979	Magnolia, AR	Arkansas–Monticello	35–18
56	November 22, 1980	Monticello, AR	Southern Arkansas	13–9
57	November 21, 1981	Magnolia, AR	Arkansas–Monticello	20–16
58	November 20, 1982	Monticello, AR	Arkansas–Monticello	14–10
59	November 19, 1983	Magnolia, AR	Southern Arkansas	10–7
60	November 17, 1984	Monticello, AR	Southern Arkansas	44–14
61	November 23, 1985	Magnolia, AR	Arkansas–Monticello	35–26
62	November 20, 1986	Monticello, AR	Arkansas–Monticello	21–7
63	November 19, 1987	Magnolia, AR	Southern Arkansas	14–13
64	November 19, 1988	Monticello, AR	Arkansas–Monticello	41–15
65	November 16, 1989	Magnolia, AR	Southern Arkansas	23–20
66	September 29, 1990	Magnolia, AR	Southern Arkansas	31–26
67	October 5, 1991	Monticello, AR	Southern Arkansas	12–6
68	October 3, 1992	Magnolia, AR	Arkansas–Monticello	21–18
69	October 30, 1993	Magnolia, AR	Arkansas–Monticello	17–9
70	November 5, 1994	Monticello, AR	Arkansas–Monticello	34–20
71	November 11, 1995	Monticello, AR	Arkansas–Monticello	50–14
72	November 2, 1996	Magnolia, AR	Arkansas–Monticello	27–20
73	November 1, 1997	Monticello, AR	Southern Arkansas	20–17
74	September 19, 1998	Monticello, AR	Southern Arkansas	44–7
75	September 18, 1999	Magnolia, AR	Arkansas–Monticello	23–20
76	October 28, 2000	Magnolia, AR	Southern Arkansas	31–21
77	October 27, 2001	Monticello, AR	Southern Arkansas	29–22
78	November 2, 2002	Magnolia, AR	Southern Arkansas	48–0
79	November 1, 2003	Monticello, AR	Southern Arkansas	31–28
80	October 2, 2004	Magnolia, AR	Arkansas–Monticello	33–31
81	October 1, 2005	Monticello, AR	Southern Arkansas	52–21
82	August 26, 2006	Magnolia, AR	Southern Arkansas	18–15
83	September 1, 2007	Monticello, AR	Southern Arkansas	38–21
84	November 8, 2008	Monticello, AR	Southern Arkansas	23–16
85	November 7, 2009	El Dorado, AR	Arkansas–Monticello	17–6
86	November 6, 2010	El Dorado, AR	Arkansas–Monticello	28–23
87	November 5, 2011	Magnolia, AR	Southern Arkansas	53–28
88	September 29, 2012	Monticello, AR	Southern Arkansas	30–14
89	November 16, 2013	Magnolia, AR	Southern Arkansas	44–20
90	November 15, 2014	Monticello, AR	Southern Arkansas	66–42
91	November 14, 2015	Magnolia, AR	Southern Arkansas	49–29
92	November 12, 2016	Monticello, AR	Southern Arkansas	56–43
93	November 11, 2017	Magnolia, AR	Southern Arkansas	51–20
94	November 10, 2018	Monticello, AR	Arkansas–Monticello	20–17
95	November 16, 2019	Magnolia, AR	Southern Arkansas	34–32
96	November 13, 2021	Magnolia, AR	Arkansas–Monticello	73–37
97	November 12, 2022	Monticello, AR	Southern Arkansas	20–7
98	November 11, 2023	Magnolia, AR	Southern Arkansas	60–17
99	November 16, 2024	Monticello, AR	Southern Arkansas	54–22
100	November 15, 2025	Magnolia, AR	Southern Arkansas	49–10
101	November 14, 2026	Monticello, AR	Arkansas–Monticello	49–34
Series: Southern Arkansas leads 62–38–1

== See also ==
- List of NCAA college football rivalry games
