= Hud Jackson =

American football coach (born 1967)

Current position
- Title: Athletic director
- Team: Arkansas–Monticello
- Conference: GAC

Biographical details
- Born: December 14, 1967 (age 58); Thibodaux, Louisiana, U.S.
- Education: McNeese State University (1992)

Playing career

Football
- 1987–1990: McNeese State

Baseball
- 1988–1991: McNeese State
- Positions: Quarterback (football); Pitcher (baseball)

Coaching career (HC unless noted)

Football
- 1991–1992: Rayne HS (LA) (assistant)
- 1992–1994: Assumption HS (LA) (OC)
- 1994–1996: Oberlin HS (LA)
- 1996–2004: Central Catholic HS (LA)
- 2005–2010: Central Arkansas (AHC)
- 2011–2025: Arkansas–Monticello

Baseball
- 1991–1992: Rayne HS (LA) (assistant)
- 1992–1994: Assumption HS (LA) (assistant)
- 1994–1996: Oberlin HS (LA)
- 1996–2004: Central Catholic HS (LA)

Administrative career (AD unless noted)
- 1994–1996: Oberlin HS (LA)
- 1996–2004: Central Catholic HS (LA)
- 2021: Arkansas–Monticello (interim AD)
- 2022–present: Arkansas–Monticello

Head coaching record
- Overall: 49–104 (college football)
- Bowls: 0–1

William "Hud" Jackson (born December 14, 1967) is an American college football coach, athletic director, and former baseball coach. He is the athletic director for the University of Arkansas at Monticello, a position he has held since 2021. He previously was the offensive coordinator for Central Arkansas and he was the head football coach for Arkansas–Monticello from 2011 to 2025. He previously coached baseball and football for Rayne High School, Oberlin High School, and Central Catholic High School. He also was the athletic director for Oberlin High School and Central Catholic High School. He played college football and college baseball for McNeese State as a quarterback and pitcher.

== Head coaching record ==
=== College football ===
Year	Team	Overall	Conference	Standing	Bowl/playoffs
Arkansas–Monticello Boll Weevils (Great American Conference) (2011–2025)
2011	Arkansas–Monticello	5–6	3–3	T–4th	
2012	Arkansas–Monticello	1–10	0–8	9th	
2013	Arkansas–Monticello	5–6	4–6	8th	
2014	Arkansas–Monticello	2–8	2–8	10th	
2015	Arkansas–Monticello	1–10	1–10	T–11th	
2016	Arkansas–Monticello	4–7	4–7	T–8th	
2017	Arkansas–Monticello	5–6	5–6	T–7th	
2018	Arkansas–Monticello	6–6	6–5	T–4th	L Heritage
2019	Arkansas–Monticello	5–6	5–6	6th	
2020–21	No team—COVID-19				
2021	Arkansas–Monticello	5–6	5–6	7th	
2022	Arkansas–Monticello	3–8	3–8	10th	
2023	Arkansas–Monticello	2–9	2–9	10th	
2024	Arkansas–Monticello	4–7	4–7	8th	
2025	Arkansas–Monticello	2–9	2–9	T–9th	
Arkansas–Monticello:		49–104	45–98		
Total:		49–104			
