= Arkansas–Monticello Boll Weevils and Cotton Blossoms =

- University: University of Arkansas at Monticello
- Conference: Great American Conference
- NCAA: Division II
- Athletic director: Hud Jackson
- Location: Monticello, Arkansas
- Varsity teams: 10
- Football stadium: Willis Leslie Stadium
- Basketball arena: Steelman Fieldhouse
- Baseball stadium: Weevils Field
- Mascot: Weezy
- Nickname: Boll Weevils (men); Cotton Blossoms (women)
- Colors: Kelly green and white
- Website: www.uamsports.com

The Arkansas–Monticello Boll Weevils and Cotton Blossoms are composed of 10 teams representing the University of Arkansas at Monticello in intercollegiate athletics, including men and women's basketball, cross country, and golf. Men's sports include baseball and football. Women's sports include volleyball and softball. The Boll Weevils and Cotton Blossoms compete in the NCAA Division II and are members of the Great American Conference.

== Teams ==
Men's	Women's
Baseball	Basketball
Basketball	Cross Country
Cross Country	Golf
Football	Softball
Golf	Volleyball

== Baseball ==
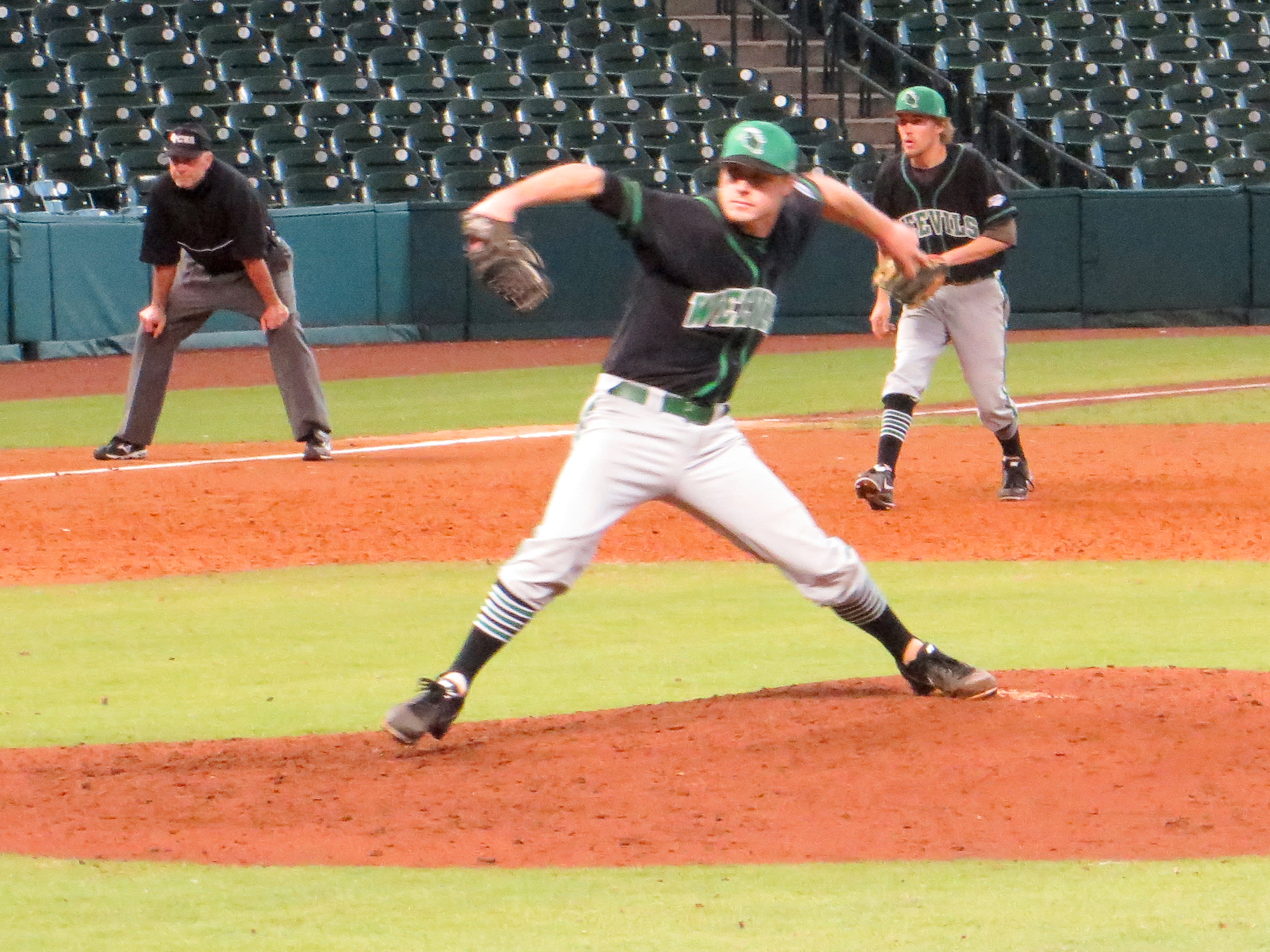
UAM pitcher Jeff Harvill delivers a pitch at Minute Maid Park in 2014.

Arkansas–Monticello has had 5 Major League Baseball draft selections since the draft began in 1965.

Year	Player	Round	Team
1965	James Eubanks	24	Yankees
1970	Mack Payne	9	Royals
1982	Vernon Rhodes	7	Blue Jays
2001	Steve Green	40	Cardinals
2001	Jake Nowlen	33	Cardinals

Former UAM player Wes Johnson is the head baseball coach for the Georgia Bulldogs.

== Current head coaches (as of February 6, 2025) ==
Name	Sport	Alma mater	Year Entering	UAM Record	Career Record
John Harvey	Baseball	Lyon College	15th	160–125	314–273
Chad Tapp	Men's Basketball	Taylor University	4th		
Gary Goff	Football	Valdosta State University	1st	0-0	0-0
Kyle Lem	Softball	Henderson State University	3rd	0–0	0–0
Aricia Ortiz	Volleyball	Fayetteville State	2nd		
David Midlick	Women's Basketball	University of Mississippi	3rd		
Rob Leonard	Men's & Women's Cross Country	N/A	35th		
Ken Hamilton	Men's & Women's Golf	Texas A&M Commerce	1st		

== Rivals ==
=== Battle of the Timberlands ===
The Battle of the Timberlands is an annual football game between University of Arkansas-Monticello and Southern Arkansas University. The game became known as the "Battle of the Timberlands" in 2012 when a traveling trophy for the contest was created. The rivalry between the two schools dates back to 1913. Both schools are currently members of the Great American Conference. Through the 88 games played, SAU leads the series 52–36–1. UAM won most recently on November 10, 2018 by a score of 20–17.
