= Arkansas–Monticello Boll Weevils football =

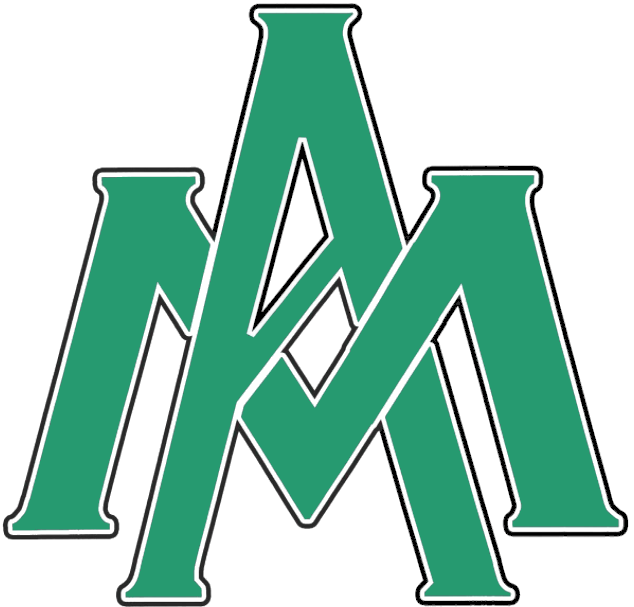
- First season: 1911; 115 years ago
- Athletic director: Hud Jackson
- Head coach: Gary Goff; 1st season, 0–1 (.000)
- Location: Monticello, Arkansas
- Stadium: Cotton Boll Stadium
- NCAA division: Division II
- Conference: Great American Conference
- Colors: Kelly green and white
- All-time record: 404–564–25 (.419)
- Rivalries: Southern Arkansas Muleriders
- Website: UAMSports.com

The Arkansas–Monticello Boll Weevils football program is the intercollegiate American football team for the University of Arkansas at Monticello located in the U.S. state of Arkansas. The team competes in the NCAA Division II and are members of the Great American Conference. Arkansas–Monticello's first football team was fielded in 1911. The team plays its home games at Willis "Convoy" Leslie Cotton Boll Stadium in Monticello, Arkansas. The Boll Weevils are coached by Gary Goff.

== Conference affiliations ==
- Independent (1911–1960)
- Arkansas Intercollegiate Conference (1961–1994)
- Gulf South Conference (1995–2010)
- Great American Conference (2011–present)

== Playoff appearances ==
=== NAIA ===
The Boll Weevils made two appearances in the NAIA playoffs, with a combined record of 2–2.

Year	Round	Opponent	Result
1988	First Round; Quarterfinals	Washburn; Pittsburg State	W, 20–13; L, 7–23
1993	Quarterfinals; Semifinals	Langston; East Central (OK)	W, 26–13; L, 0–27

== Boll Weevils in professional football ==
=== Active ===
As of May 2018, there is a total of one Boll Weevil listed on team rosters in the NFL, CFL, and AFL.

- Eric Crocker, DB for the Portland Thunder
- Clarence Denmark, WR for the Winnipeg Blue Bombers
- D. J. Stephens, WR for the San Antonio Talons
- Jalen Tolliver, WR for the Tennessee Titans
