= Great American Conference =

NCAA Division II college athletic conference

- Association: NCAA
- Founded: 2011
- Commissioner: Will Prewitt (since 2010)
- Sports fielded: 15; men's: 7; women's: 8
- Division: Division II
- No. of teams: 12
- Headquarters: Russellville, Arkansas
- Region: South Central
- Website: greatamericanconference.com

Locations
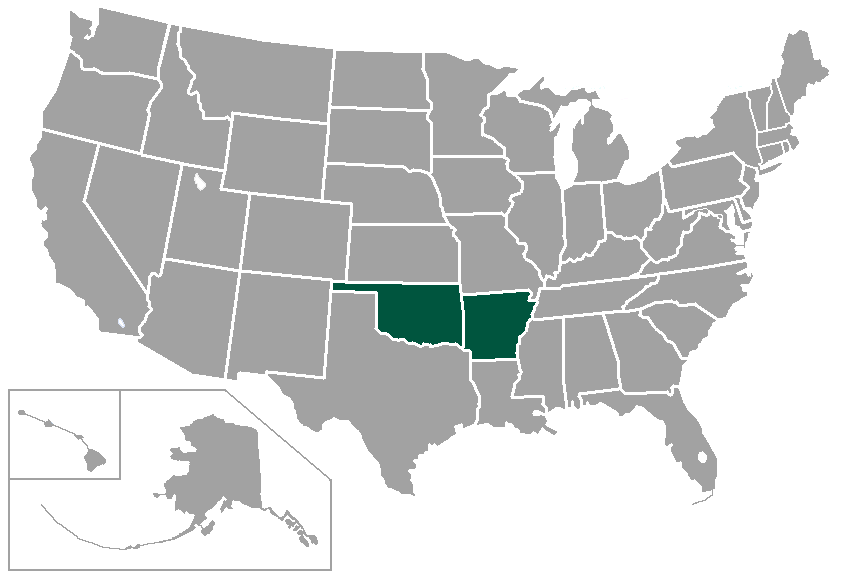

The Great American Conference (GAC) is a college athletic conference affiliated with the National Collegiate Athletic Association (NCAA) at the Division II level, with headquarters located in Russellville, Arkansas. Athletic competition began play during the 2011–12 school year. Its twelve all-sports member schools are located in Arkansas and Oklahoma in the South Central United States. The conference also has four men's soccer affiliate members, two in Kansas and two in Oklahoma.

== History ==
Great American Conference
Location of GAC Members:
– Full member
– Men's soccer associate member

The conference's charter members previously competed in the Lone Star Conference (East Central University, Southeastern Oklahoma State University, and Southwestern Oklahoma State University) and the Gulf South Conference (Arkansas Tech University, University of Arkansas at Monticello, Harding University, Henderson State University, Ouachita Baptist University, and Southern Arkansas University) before forming the GAC in 2010. The new conference is intended to reduce travel costs for its member universities.

On May 11, 2011, the conference invited Northwestern Oklahoma State University and Southern Nazarene University to the conference for the 2012–13 academic year. Those universities continued to compete in the Sooner Athletic Conference during the 2011–12 season before joining the conference.

On July 11, 2014, the NCAA Division II Membership Committee approved the membership application for Oklahoma Baptist University to move from the NAIA to NCAA Division II and it joined the conference for the 2015–16 season.

The GAC and the Mid-America Intercollegiate Athletics Association (MIAA) announced a partnership in June 2018 to combine their men's tennis and men's soccer leagues in both sports from the 2019–20 academic year. Under the agreement, the MIAA will organize the tennis league and the GAC will organize the soccer league.

=== Chronological timeline ===
- 2011 – The Great American Conference (GAC) was founded. Charter members included six schools from the state of Arkansas (Arkansas Tech, Arkansas–Monticello, Harding, Henderson State, Ouachita Baptist, and Southern Arkansas from the Gulf South Conference) and three schools from the state of Oklahoma (East Central, Southeastern Oklahoma State, and Southwestern Oklahoma State from the Lone Star Conference) effective beginning the 2011–12 academic year.
- 2012 – Northwestern Oklahoma State and Southern Nazarene joined the GAC effective in the 2012–13 academic year.
- 2015 – Oklahoma Baptist joined the GAC effective in the 2015–16 academic year.
- 2015 – Oklahoma Christian University and Rogers State University joined the GAC as affiliate members for men's and women's track & field outdoor effective in the 2016 spring season (2015–16 academic year). Both schools were Heartland Conference full members at this time.
- 2019 – Oklahoma Christian and Rogers State left the GAC as affiliate members for men's and women's track & field outdoor effective after the 2019 spring season (2018–19 academic year) due to moving to new primary conferences who sponsors the sports.
- 2019 – Fort Hays State University, Newman University, Northeastern State University, and Rogers State joined the GAC as affiliate members for men's soccer effective in the 2019 fall season (2019–20 academic year).

== Member schools ==
=== Current members ===
| Institution | Location | Founded | Affiliation | Enrollment | Nickname | Colors | Joined |
|---|---|---|---|---|---|---|---|
| Arkansas Tech University | Russellville, Arkansas | 1909 | Public | 8,808 | Wonder Boys & Golden Suns | | 2011 |
| University of Arkansas at Monticello | Monticello, Arkansas | 1909 | Public | 2,270 | Boll Weevils & Cotton Blossoms | | 2011 |
| East Central University | Ada, Oklahoma | 1909 | Public | 2,460 | Tigers | | 2011 |
| Harding University | Searcy, Arkansas | 1924 | Private (Churches of Christ) | 4,540 | Bisons & Lady Bisons | | 2011 |
| Henderson State University | Arkadelphia, Arkansas | 1890 | Public | 1,807 | Reddies | | 2011 |
| Northwestern Oklahoma State University | Alva, Oklahoma | 1897 | Public | 1,732 | Rangers | | 2012 |
| Oklahoma Baptist University | Shawnee, Oklahoma | 1910 | Private (Baptist General Convention of Oklahoma) | 1,409 | Bison | | 2015 |
| Ouachita Baptist University | Arkadelphia, Arkansas | 1886 | Private (Southern Baptist Convention) | 1,734 | Tigers | | 2011 |
| Southeastern Oklahoma State University | Durant, Oklahoma | 1909 | Public | 3,022 | Savage Storm | | 2011 |
| Southern Arkansas University | Magnolia, Arkansas | 1909 | Public | 3,250 | Muleriders | | 2011 |
| Southern Nazarene University | Bethany, Oklahoma | 1899 | Private (Church of the Nazarene) | 912 | Crimson Storm | | 2012 |
| Southwestern Oklahoma State University | Weatherford, Oklahoma | 1901 | Public | 3,995 | Bulldogs | | 2011 |

=== Affiliate members ===
| Institution | Location | Founded | Affiliation | Enrollment | Nickname | Colors | Joined | GAC sport | Primary conference |
|---|---|---|---|---|---|---|---|---|---|
| Fort Hays State University | Hays, Kansas | 1902 | Public | 14,658 | Tigers | | 2019 | soccer (M) | Mid-America |
| Newman University | Wichita, Kansas | 1933 | Catholic (A.S.C.) | 3,170 | Jets | | 2019 | soccer (M) | Mid-America |
| Northeastern State University | Tahlequah, Oklahoma | 1909 | Public | 8,276 | RiverHawks | | 2019 | soccer (M) | Mid-America |
| Rogers State University | Claremore, Oklahoma | 1909 | Public | 4,227 | Hillcats | | 2019 | soccer (M) | Mid-America |

- Rogers State — track & field outdoor (M), track & field outdoor (W) affiliate member in 2015–2019.

=== Former affiliate members ===
| Institution | Location | Founded | Affiliation | Nickname | Years | GAC sport | Primary conference |
|---|---|---|---|---|---|---|---|
| Oklahoma Christian University | Oklahoma City, Oklahoma | 1950 | Private (Churches of Christ) | Eagles & Lady Eagles | 2015–2019 | track & field outdoor (M); track & field outdoor (W) | Lone Star |

=== Membership timeline ===
Full members
Affiliate member
Other Conference
Other Conference

== Sports ==
The GAC sponsors championships in seven men's and eight women's sports.

Conference sports
| Sport | (M) | (W) |
|---|---|---|
| Baseball | check | |
| Basketball | check | check |
| Cross Country | check | check |
| Football | check | |
| Golf | check | check |
| Soccer | check | check |
| Softball | | check |
| Tennis | | check |
| Track & Field Indoor | check | check |
| Track & Field Outdoor | check | check |
| Volleyball | | check |

=== Men's sponsored sports by school ===
| School | Baseball | Basketball | Cross Country | Football | Golf | Soccer | Track & Field Indoor † | Track & Field Outdoor | GAC Sports |
|---|---|---|---|---|---|---|---|---|---|
| Arkansas Tech | check | check | | check | check | | | | 4 |
| Arkansas–Monticello | check | check | check | check | check | | | | 5 |
| East Central | check | check | check | check | check | | | check | 6 |
| Harding | check | check | check | check | check | check | check | check | 7 |
| Henderson State | check | check | | check | check | | | check | 5 |
| Northwestern Oklahoma State | check | check | check | check | check | | check | check | 6 |
| Oklahoma Baptist | check | check | check | check | | | check | check | 5 |
| Ouachita Baptist | check | check | check | check | | check | | check | 6 |
| Southeastern Oklahoma State | check | check | | check | check | | | | 4 |
| Southern Arkansas | check | check | check | check | check | | check | check | 6 |
| Southern Nazarene | check | check | check | check | check | check | check | check | 7 |
| Southwestern Oklahoma State | check | check | | check | check | | | | 4 |
| Totals | 12 | 12 | 8 | 12 | 10 | 3 | | 8 | 65 |
Affiliates
| Fort Hays State | | | | | | check | | | 1 |
| Newman | | | | | | check | | | 1 |
| Northeastern State | | | | | | check | | | 1 |
| Rogers State | | | | | | check | | | 1 |

- † — Emerging sport; teams currently compete in Independent.

=== Women's sponsored sports by school ===
| School | Basketball | Cross Country | Golf | Soccer | Softball | Tennis | Track & Field Indoor † | Track & Field Outdoor | Volleyball | GAC Sports |
|---|---|---|---|---|---|---|---|---|---|---|
| Arkansas Tech | check | check | check | | check | check | | check | check | 7 |
| Arkansas–Monticello | check | check | check | | check | | | | check | 5 |
| East Central | check | check | check | check | check | | | check | check | 7 |
| Harding | check | check | check | check | check | check | check | check | check | 8 |
| Henderson State | check | check | check | | check | check | | check | check | 7 |
| Northwestern Oklahoma State | check | check | check | check | check | | check | check | check | 7 |
| Oklahoma Baptist | check | check | check | check | check | | check | check | check | 7 |
| Ouachita Baptist | check | check | | check | check | check | check | check | check | 7 |
| Southeastern Oklahoma State | check | check | check | | check | check | check | check | check | 7 |
| Southern Arkansas | check | check | check | | check | check | check | check | check | 7 |
| Southern Nazarene | check | check | check | check | check | | check | check | check | 7 |
| Southwestern Oklahoma State | check | check | check | check | check | | | check | check | 7 |
| Totals | 12 | 12 | 11 | 7 | 12 | 6 | | 11 | 12 | 83 |

- † — Emerging sport; teams currently compete in Independent.

=== Other sponsored sports by school ===
| School | Men | | | Women |
| School | Swimming & Diving | Tennis | Wrestling | Swimming & Diving |
|---|---|---|---|---|
| Harding | | MIAA | | |
| Henderson State | NSISC | | | NSISC |
| Ouachita Baptist | NSISC | MIAA | MIAA | NSISC |
| Southeastern Oklahoma State | | MIAA | | |
| Southern Arkansas | | MIAA | | |

=== Women's NCAA emerging sports by school ===
| School | Stunt |
|---|---|
| Oklahoma Baptist | IND |
| Southern Nazarene | IND |

== Awards ==
=== Scholar-Athlete of the Year ===
The male and female scholar-athlete of the year awards are voted upon by the league's faculty athletic representatives or designees.

| Year | Male | Female |
|---|---|---|
| 2011–12 | Travis Kincheloe, Football (SOSU) | Emily Kennemer, Softball (ECU) |
| 2012–13 | Mickey Hammer, Cross Country (SAU) | Amy Madden, Softball (SNU) |
| 2013–14 | Kevin Rodgers, Football (HSU) | Kristen Celsor, Basketball (HU) |
| 2014–15 | Davis Richardson, Baseball (HU) | Arielle Saunders, Basketball (HU) |
| 2015–16 | Colin Pasque, Track & Field (SNU) | Autumn Suydam, Softball (ECU) |
| 2016–17 | Colin Pasque, Track & Field (SNU) | Kori Bullard, Volleyball / Basketball (OBU) |
| 2017–18 | Ty Reasnor, Football (ATU) | Kori Bullard, Volleyball / Basketball (OBU) |
| 2018–19 | Dylan McDearmon, Baseball (ATU) | Mariah Ewy, Softball (ECU) |
| 2019–20 | Mills Bryant, Football (HU) | Abbie Winchester, T&F / Cross country (ECU) |
| 2020–21 | Matthew Hipshire, Track & Field (HU) | Allie Bianchi, Golf (HSU) |
| 2021–22 | Matthew Hipshire, Track & Field (HU) | Allie Bianchi, Golf (HSU) |
| 2022–23 | Cody Smith, Baseball (HU) | Allie Bianchi, Golf (HSU) |
| 2023–24 | Sam Tandy, Golf (HU) | Anna Kay Clark, Track & Field (HU) |
| 2024–25 | Colter Bufford, Track & Field (SNU) | Sage Hawley, Basketball (HU) |
| 2025–26 | Colter Bufford, Track & Field (SNU) | Elise Knight, Track & Field (OKBU) |

=== Athlete of the Year ===
The male and female athlete of the year awards are voted upon by the league's sports information directors or designees.

| Year | Male | Female |
|---|---|---|
| 2011–12 | Johnie Davis, Basketball (ATU) | Kayla Jackson, Softball (UAM) |
| 2012–13 | Kevin Rodgers, Football (HSU) | Roselis Silva, Basketball (ATU) |
| 2013–14 | Kevin Rodgers, Football (HSU) | Rebecka Surtevall, Golf (ATU) |
| 2014–15 | Michael Hearne, Golf (SNU) | Rebecka Surtevall, Golf (ATU) |
| 2015–16 | Corey Wood, Baseball (UAM) | Jalissa Gum, Softball (ATU) |
| 2016–17 | Trevor Rucker, Baseball (SAU) | Maddie Dow, Softball (SAU) |
| 2017–18 | Zach James, Golf (SOSU) | Brooke Goad, Softball (SAU) |
| 2018–19 | Bryce Bray, Football (HU) | Hailey Tucker, Basketball (SWOSU) |
| 2019–20 | Jhonathan Dunn, Basketball (SNU) | Kim Moosbacher, Tennis (OKBU) |
| 2020–21 | Dorian Chaigneau, Track & Field (HU) | Mahina Sauer, Softball (SNU) |
| 2021–22 | Jeremy Adorno, Baseball (SAU) | Tymber Riley, Softball / Volleyball (ATU) |
| 2022–23 | Lamar Taylor, Swimming (HSU) | Kayleigh Jones, Softball (OKBU) |
| 2023–24 | Nathaniel Wallace, Football (HU) | Allie Bianchi, Golf (HSU) |
| 2024–25 | Sean Dixon, Track & Field (OKBU) | Brinson Rogers, Softball (SAU) |
| 2025–26 | Vlad Malykhin, Track & Field (HU) | Jamora Horace, Track & Field (OKBU) |

=== All-Sports Trophy ===
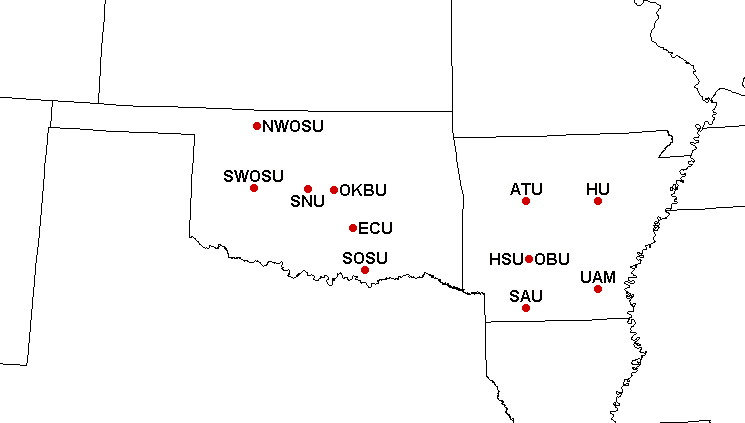
Locations of Great American Conference member institutions

The All-Sports Trophy is presented to the athletic department with the highest point total at the end of the athletic year. Points are recorded in all sponsored sports with six or more participants. The regular season standings will determine the points for the sports of baseball, men's basketball, women's basketball, football, women's soccer, softball, women's tennis, and volleyball. The conference championship will determine the points for the sports of men's cross country, women's cross country, men's golf, and women's golf.

| Season | School |
|---|---|
| 2011–12 | Arkansas Tech |
| 2012–13 | Arkansas Tech |
| 2013–14 | Arkansas Tech |
| 2014–15 | Arkansas Tech |
| 2015–16 | Arkansas Tech |
| 2016–17 | Harding |
| 2017–18 | Arkansas Tech |
| 2018–19 | Harding |
| 2019–20 | No Standings due to COVID-19 |
| 2021 | Harding |
| 2021–22 | Harding |
| 2022–23 | Harding |
| 2023–24 | Harding |
| 2024–25 | Harding |
| 2025–26 | Harding |

=== NACDA Learfield Sports Directors' Cup Rankings ===
The NACDA Learfield Sports Directors' Cup is an annual award given by the National Association of Collegiate Directors of Athletics to the U.S. colleges and universities with the most success in collegiate athletics.

| Year | ATU | UAM | ECU | HU | HSU | NWOSU | OKBU | OBU | SOSU | SAU | SNU | SWOSU |
|---|---|---|---|---|---|---|---|---|---|---|---|---|
| 2011–12 | 171 | — | 194 | 216 | 195 | — | — | 79 | — | 201 | — | — |
| 2012–13 | 147 | — | — | 116 | 110 | — | — | 125 | 231 | 211 | — | 94 |
| 2013–14 | 71 | 228 | — | 142 | 148 | — | — | 188 | 175 | 191 | — | 176 |
| 2014–15 | 74 | — | 172 | 146 | 86 | — | — | 109 | 225 | 209 | 230 | 177 |
| 2015–16 | 101 | 208 | 214 | 138 | 120 | — | — | 196 | 117 | 198 | 261 | 121 |
| 2016–17 | 110 | 190 | 217 | 62 | 140 | — | — | — | 180 | 217 | 232 | 235 |
| 2017–18 | 91 | — | — | 111 | 138 | — | 50 | 203 | 163 | 141 | 251 | 114 |
| 2018–19 | 111 | 239 | — | 151 | 175 | — | 39 | 204 | 141 | 123 | 193 | 100 |
| 2019–20 | No Standings due to COVID-19 | | | | | | | | | | | |
| 2020–21 | No Standings due to COVID-19 | | | | | | | | | | | |
| 2021–22 | 109 | — | — | 92 | 93 | — | 175 | 168 | — | 121 | — | 236 |
| 2022–23 | 237 | — | — | 48 | 98 | — | 206 | 134 | 165 | 109 | 156 | 226 |
| 2023–24 | 211 | 199 | 158 | 16 | 59 | — | 151 | 126 | 238 | 173 | 119 | 205 |
| 2024–25 | 171 | 239 | 198 | 25 | 105 | — | 128 | 72 | — | 130 | 197 | 231 |
| 2025–26 | 121 | — | 215 | 35 | 200 | 228 | 57 | 166 | — | 180 | 224 | 195 |

== Conference Champions ==
=== Current champions ===
Fall 2016
| Sport | School |
|---|---|
| Cross; Country (M) | East Central (Team) Kevin Matthews (ECU) (Individual) |
| Cross; Country (W) | East Central (Team) Anna Mora (ECU) (Individual) |
| Football | Harding |
| Soccer (M) | Oklahoma Baptist (Season) Harding (Tournament) |
| Soccer (W) | Southwestern Oklahoma State (Season) Harding (Tournament) |
| Volleyball (W) | Harding (Season) Southern Nazarene (Tournament) |

Winter 2016–17
| Sport | School |
|---|---|
| Basketball (M) | East Central (Season) East Central (Tournament) |
| Basketball (W) | Harding (Season) Harding (Tournament) |

Spring 2017
| Sport | School |
|---|---|
| Baseball | Southern Arkansas (Season) Arkansas–Monticello (Tournament) |
| Golf (M) | Henderson State (Team) Nick Shapiro (HSU) (Individual) |
| Golf (W) | Arkansas Tech (Team) Elin Wahlin (SWOSU) (Individual) |
| Softball | Harding (Season) Harding (Tournament) |
| Tennis (M) | Oklahoma Baptist (Season) Oklahoma Baptist (Tournament) |
| Tennis (W) | Southeastern Oklahoma State (Season) Southeastern Oklahoma State (Tournament) |
| Track & Field; Outdoor | Harding (Men) Harding (Women) |

=== Total conference championships ===
Total conference postseason championships and football regular season championships won by each school.

| | | Team | | Individual | |
| School | Total | Men | Women | Men | Women |
|---|---|---|---|---|---|
| Arkansas Tech | 16 | 3 | 9 | 1 | 3 |
| Arkansas–Monticello | 3 | 2 | 1 | | |
| East Central | 17 | 6 | 6 | 4 | 1 |
| Harding | 27 | 6 | 15 | 1 | 5 |
| Henderson State | 13 | 7 | 1 | 4 | 1 |
| Northwestern Oklahoma State | | | | | |
| Oklahoma Baptist | 1 | 1 | | | |
| Ouachita Baptist | 10 | 9 | 1 | | |
| Southeastern Oklahoma State | 4 | 1 | 3 | | |
| Southern Arkansas | 8 | 4 | 2 | 1 | 1 |
| Southern Nazarene | 2 | | 1 | 1 | |
| Southwestern Oklahoma State | 7 | 1 | 5 | | 1 |

== Facilities ==
| School | Football stadium | Capacity | Basketball arena | Capacity | Baseball stadium | Capacity |
|---|---|---|---|---|---|---|
| Arkansas Tech | Thone Stadium at Buerkle Field | 6,500 | Tucker Coliseum | 3,500 | Tech Field | 600 |
| Arkansas–Monticello | Willis Convoy Leslie Cotton Boll Stadium | 4,500 | Steelman Fieldhouse | 1,500 | Weevils Field | 600 |
| East Central | Norris Field | 5,000 | Kerr Activities Center | 3,500 | Ken Turner Field | 250 |
| Harding | First Security Stadium | 6,500 | Rhodes Field House | 3,000 | Jerry Moore Field | 311 |
| Henderson State | Carpenter-Haygood Stadium at Ruggles Field | 9,600 | Duke Wells Center | 3,000 | Clyde Berry Field | 1,000 |
| Northwestern Oklahoma State | Ranger Field | 6,000 | Percefull Fieldhouse | 2,100 | Myers Stadium | 500 |
| Oklahoma Baptist | Crain Family Stadium | 2,900 | Mabee Arena | 2,400 | Bison Field at Ford Park | 400 |
| Ouachita Baptist | Cliff Harris Stadium | 5,225 | Bill Vining Arena | 2,500 | Rab Rodgers Field | 500 |
| Southeastern Oklahoma State | Paul Laird Field | 9,000 | Bloomer Sullivan Arena | 3,600 | The Ballpark in Durant | 420 |
| Southern Arkansas | Wilkins Stadium | 6,000 | W.T. Watson Athletic Center | 2,500 | Steve Goodheart Field | 1,000 |
| Southern Nazarene | SNU Stadium | 2,500 | Sawyer Center | 5,000 | Cypert Athletic Complex | 300 |
| Southwestern Oklahoma State | ASAP Energy Field at Milam Stadium | 8,600 | Pioneer Cellular Event Center | 4,000 | Bulldog Field | 300 |

== National Championships ==
=== NCAA Division II ===
| Year | School | Sport |
|---|---|---|
| 2023 | Harding | Football |

Team and individual titles won prior to joining the GAC or by members in sports not sponsored by the GAC.

| Year | School | Sport |
|---|---|---|
| 2000 | Southeastern Oklahoma State | Baseball |
| 2015 | Dallas Smith (OBU) | Wrestling |

=== NAIA ===
Men's Basketball
| Year | School |
|---|---|
| 1966 | Oklahoma Baptist |
| 1981 | Southern Nazarene |
| 2010 | Oklahoma Baptist |

Women's Basketball
| Year | School |
|---|---|
| 1982 | Southwestern Oklahoma State |
| 1983 | Southwestern Oklahoma State |
| 1985 | Southwestern Oklahoma State |
| 1987 | Southwestern Oklahoma State |
| 1989 | Southern Nazarene |
| 1990 | Southwestern Oklahoma State |
| 1992 | Arkansas Tech |
| 1993 | Arkansas Tech |
| 1994 | Southern Nazarene |
| 1995 | Southern Nazarene |
| 1996 | Southern Nazarene |
| 1997 | Southern Nazarene |
| 2003 | Southern Nazarene |
| 2004 | Southern Nazarene |

Football
| Year | School |
|---|---|
| 1993 | East Central |
| 1996 | Southwestern Oklahoma State |
| 1999 | Northwestern Oklahoma State |

Women's Golf
| Year | School |
|---|---|
| 1999 | Southern Nazarene |
| 2002 | Southern Nazarene |

Men's Swimming & Diving
| Year | School |
|---|---|
| 2012 | Oklahoma Baptist |
| 2013 | Oklahoma Baptist |
| 2014 | Oklahoma Baptist |
| 2015 | Oklahoma Baptist |

Women's Swimming & Diving
| Year | School |
|---|---|
| 2013 | Oklahoma Baptist |
| 2014 | Oklahoma Baptist |
| 2015 | Oklahoma Baptist |

Men's Track & Field Indoor
| Year | School |
|---|---|
| 2013 | Oklahoma Baptist |

Women's Track & Field Indoor
| Year | School |
|---|---|
| 2005 | Oklahoma Baptist |
| 2007 | Oklahoma Baptist |
| 2010 | Oklahoma Baptist |
| 2011 | Oklahoma Baptist |
| 2013 | Oklahoma Baptist |
| 2014 | Oklahoma Baptist |
| 2015 | Oklahoma Baptist |

Men's Track & Field Outdoor
| Year | School |
|---|---|
| 1990 | Oklahoma Baptist |
| 2007 | Oklahoma Baptist |

Women's Track & Field Outdoor
| Year | School |
|---|---|
| 2012 | Oklahoma Baptist |

== Championships and Postseason ==
- — national tournament game.

=== Cross Country ===
==== GAC Champions ====
| | Men | | Women | |
| Year | School | Individual | School | Individual |
|---|---|---|---|---|
| 2011 | East Central | Ezekiel Kissorio (ECU) | Harding | Gladys Kimtai (HU) |
| 2012 | East Central | Mickey Hammer (SAU) | East Central | Ewa Zaborowska (HU) |
| 2013 | Harding | Andrew Evans (HU) | Harding | Ewa Zaborowska (HU) |
| 2014 | East Central | Juan Pacheco (ECU) | Harding | Carli Langley (SAU) |
| 2015 | East Central | Will Baldwin (ECU) | Harding | Ewa Zaborowska (HU) |
| 2016 | East Central | Kevin Matthews (ECU) | East Central | Anna Mora (ECU) |
| 2017 | Harding | Jacob Janzen (OKB) | Oklahoma Baptist | Abby Hoover (OKB) |
| 2018 | East Central | Larry Filer (ECU) | Oklahoma Baptist | Kaylee Crowson (OKB) |
| 2019 | Oklahoma Baptist | Dylan Douglas (HU) | Oklahoma Baptist | Anna Mora (ECU) |

==== NCAA Championships Results ====
Men

| Year | School / Individual | Finish |
|---|---|---|
| 2011 | East Central | 11th |
| 2014 | Juan Pacheco (ECU) | 50th |
| 2015 | East Central | 16th |

Women

| Year | School / Individual | Finish |
|---|---|---|
| 2012 | Ewa Zaborowska (HU) | 18th |
| 2015 | Harding | 17th |

=== Football ===
==== GAC Champions ====
| Year | School |
|---|---|
| 2011 | Ouachita Baptist |
| 2012 | Henderson State |
| 2013 | Henderson State |
| 2014 | Ouachita Baptist |
| 2015 | Henderson State |
| 2016 | Harding |
| 2017 | Ouachita Baptist |
| 2018 | Ouachita Baptist |
| 2019 | Ouachita Baptist |
| 2020 | Season Not Played |
| 2021 | Harding |
| 2022 | Ouachita Baptist |
| 2023 | Harding |
| 2024 | Harding |
| 2025 | Harding |

==== GAC All-Time Standings ====
| School | W | L | Pct | Titles | Last Title |
|---|---|---|---|---|---|
| Arkansas Tech | 54 | 67 | .446 | 0 | – |
| Arkansas–Monticello | 40 | 82 | .328 | 0 | – |
| East Central | 54 | 70 | .435 | 0 | – |
| Harding | 102 | 20 | .836 | 3 | 2023 |
| Henderson State | 94 | 27 | .777 | 3 | 2015 |
| Northwestern Oklahoma State | 29 | 79 | .269 | 0 | – |
| Oklahoma Baptist | 32 | 56 | .364 | 0 | – |
| Ouachita Baptist | 101 | 22 | .821 | 6 | 2022 |
| Southeastern Oklahoma State | 57 | 67 | .460 | 0 | – |
| Southern Arkansas | 77 | 46 | .626 | 0 | – |
| Southern Nazarene | 24 | 84 | .222 | 0 | – |
| Southwestern Oklahoma State | 40 | 84 | .323 | 0 | – |

==== NCAA Tournament Results ====
| Year | School | Opponent | Score |
|---|---|---|---|
| 2012 | Harding | Northwest Missouri State | L 0–35 |
| 2012 | Henderson State | Missouri Western State | L 21–45 |
| 2013 | Henderson State | St. Cloud State | L 35–40 |
| 2014 | Harding | Pittsburg State | L 42–59 |
| 2014 | Ouachita Baptist | Minnesota–Duluth | L 45–48 (OT) |
| 2015 | Henderson State | Sioux Falls | W 23–16 |
| 2015 | Henderson State | Emporia State | L 3–29 |
| 2016 | Harding | Central Missouri | W 48–31 |
| 2016 | Harding | Sioux Falls | W 27–24 |
| 2016 | Harding | Northwest Missouri State | L 0–35 |
| 2017 | Harding | Indianapolis | W 27-24 |
| 2017 | Harding | Ashland | W 34–24 |
| 2017 | Harding | Ferris State | W 16-14 |
| 2017 | Harding | Texas A&M-Commerce | L 17-31 |
| 2017 | Ouachita Baptist | Ferris State | L 19–24 |
| 2018 | Harding | Ferris State | L 19–21 |
| 2018 | Ouachita Baptist | Indianapolis | W 35-7 |
| 2018 | Ouachita Baptist | Ferris State | L 14–37 |
| 2019 | Harding | Northwest Missouri State | L 6–7 |
| 2019 | Ouachita Baptist | Lindenwood | L 38-41 |
| 2021 | Harding | Washburn | W 30-14 |
| 2021 | Harding | Northwest Missouri State | L 9–28 |
| 2022 | Ouachita Baptist | Northwest Missouri State | L 17-47 |

==== Bowl Games ====
The C.H.A.M.P.S. Heart of Texas Bowl held a Division II game from 2012 through 2018, with the GAC receiving the at-large selection in each of the first four years of the game. From 2013 through 2023, the GAC had a tie-in with the Live United Texarkana Bowl in which the highest non-playoff team received an automatic selection to the game. The Heritage Bowl, which began in 2017, has a at-large selection option with the GAC, and has invited a GAC team in every year since 2018.

| Year | Game | School | Opponent | Score |
|---|---|---|---|---|
| 2012 | C.H.A.M.P.S. Heart of Texas Bowl | Southern Arkansas | McMurry | L 35–36 |
| 2013 | C.H.A.M.P.S. Heart of Texas Bowl | Ouachita Baptist | Tarleton State | Cancelled |
| 2013 | Live United Texarkana Bowl | Harding | Texas A&M–Commerce | W 44–3 |
| 2014 | C.H.A.M.P.S. Heart of Texas Bowl | East Central | Texas A&M–Commerce | L 21–72 |
| 2014 | Live United Texarkana Bowl | Southeastern Oklahoma State | Central Missouri | L 21–48 |
| 2015 | C.H.A.M.P.S. Heart of Texas Bowl | Arkansas Tech | Eastern New Mexico | W 51–35 |
| 2015 | Live United Texarkana Bowl | Southwestern Oklahoma State | Central Oklahoma | L 21–38 |
| 2016 | Live United Texarkana Bowl | Southern Arkansas | Texas A&M–Kingsville | L 17–24 |
| 2017 | Live United Texarkana Bowl | Arkansas Tech | Pittsburg State | L 31–48 |
| 2018 | Heritage Bowl | Arkansas–Monticello | Emporia State | L 22–30 |
| 2018 | Live United Texarkana Bowl | Southern Arkansas | Missouri Western | L 25–30 |
| 2019 | Heritage Bowl | Southern Arkansas | Eastern New Mexico | L 13–20 |
| 2019 | Live United Texarkana Bowl | Henderson State | Missouri Western | L 14–35 |
| 2021 | Heritage Bowl | Oklahoma Baptist | UT–Permian Basin | W 24–21 |
| 2021 | Live United Texarkana Bowl | Southeastern Oklahoma State | Emporia State | W 37–34 |
| 2022 | Heritage Bowl | East Central | Texas A&M–Kingsville | W 38–21 |
| 2022 | Live United Texarkana Bowl | Southeastern Oklahoma State | Emporia State | L 27–48 |
| 2023 | Heritage Bowl | Southern Nazarene | Emporia State | L 24–55 |
| 2023 | Live United Texarkana Bowl | Southern Arkansas | Missouri Western | W 43–27 |
| 2025 | Heritage Bowl | Arkansas Tech | West Texas A&M | L 27-28 |

=== Men's Soccer ===
==== GAC Champions ====
| Year | Season | Tournament |
|---|---|---|
| 2015 | Ouachita Baptist | Ouachita Baptist |
| 2016 | Oklahoma Baptist | Harding |
| 2017 | Harding | Ouachita Baptist |
| 2018 | Harding | Ouachita Baptist |
| 2019 | Fort Hays State | Rogers State |
| Spring 2021 | Rodgers State | Rodgers State |
| 2021 | Southern Nazarene | Fort Hays State |
| 2022 | Southern Nazarene | Southern Nazarene |
| 2023 | Southern Nazarene | Southern Nazarene |
| 2024 | Southern Nazarene | TBD |

==== GAC All-Time Standings ====
| | Conference | | | | | | Tournament | | | | | |
| School | W | L | T | Pct | Titles | Last Title | W | L | T | Pct | Titles | Last Title |
|---|---|---|---|---|---|---|---|---|---|---|---|---|
| Harding | 39 | 44 | 8 | .473 | 2 | 2018 | 3 | 4 | 1 | .438 | 1 | 2016 |
| Oklahoma Baptist | 16 | 21 | 1 | .434 | 1 | 2016 | 2 | 4 | 0 | .333 | 0 | – |
| Ouachita Baptist | 23 | 60 | 9 | .299 | 1 | 2015 | 5 | 1 | 1 | .786 | 3 | 2018 |
| Southern Nazarene | 48 | 41 | 6 | .537 | 4 | 2024 | 5 | 4 | 2 | .545 | 2 | 2023 |
| Fort Hays State | 44 | 13 | 11 | .728 | 1 | 2019 | 4 | 2 | 1 | .563 | 1 | 2021 |
| Rodgers State | 43 | 15 | 10 | .703 | 1 | 2021 | 5 | 4 | 1 | .550 | 2 | 2021 |
| Northeastern State | 34 | 25 | 8 | .567 | 0 | – | 2 | 3 | 0 | .400 | 0 | – |
| Newman | 19 | 43 | 6 | .324 | 0 | – | 0 | 1 | 0 | .000 | 0 | – |

Oklahoma Baptist ended their Men's program in 2020. 

==== NCAA Tournament Results ====
| Year | School | Opponent | Score |
|---|---|---|---|
| 2019 | Fort Hays State | Indianapolis | L 2-3 |
| 2021 | Fort Hays State | Wisconsin-Parkside | W 2-1 |
| 2021 | Fort Hays State | Lake Erie College | W 3-2 (2OT) |
| 2021 | Fort Hays State | Indianapolis | L 0-2 |
| 2022 | Southern Nazarene | Lake Erie College | L 0-4 |
| 2023 | Southern Nazarene | McKendree | L 0-1 |

=== Women's Soccer ===
==== GAC Champions ====
| Year | Season | Tournament |
|---|---|---|
| 2011 | East Central | East Central |
| 2012 | Southwestern Oklahoma State | Southwestern Oklahoma State |
| 2013 | Southwestern Oklahoma State | Southwestern Oklahoma State |
| 2014 | Southern Nazarene | Ouachita Baptist |
| 2015 | Harding | Harding |
| 2016 | Southwestern Oklahoma State | Harding |
| 2017 | Oklahoma Baptist | Southwestern Oklahoma State |
| 2018 | Oklahoma Baptist | Oklahoma Baptist |
| 2019 | Southwestern Oklahoma State | Southwestern Oklahoma State |
| Spring 2021 | Oklahoma Baptist | Ouachita Baptist |
| 2021 | Southwestern Oklahoma State | Oklahoma Baptist |
| 2022 | Southwestern Oklahoma State | Southwestern Oklahoma State |

==== GAC All-Time Standings ====
| | Conference | | | | | | Tournament | | | | | |
| School | W | L | T | Pct | Titles | Last Title | W | L | T | Pct | Titles | Last Title |
|---|---|---|---|---|---|---|---|---|---|---|---|---|
| East Central | 40 | 71 | 13 | .375 | 1 | 2011 | 2 | 4 | 2 | .375 | 1 | 2011 |
| Harding | 59 | 52 | 15 | .528 | 1 | 2015 | 4 | 8 | 1 | .346 | 2 | 2016 |
| Northwestern Oklahoma State | 24 | 82 | 14 | .258 | 0 | – | 0 | 3 | 0 | .000 | 0 | – |
| Oklahoma Baptist | 59 | 21 | 10 | .711 | 3 | 2021 | 8 | 4 | 0 | .667 | 2 | 2021 |
| Ouachita Baptist | 70 | 46 | 10 | .595 | 0 | – | 7 | 8 | 1 | .469 | 2 | 2021 |
| Southern Nazarene | 36 | 78 | 5 | .324 | 1 | 2014 | 1 | 3 | 2 | .333 | 0 | – |
| Southwestern Oklahoma State | 84 | 22 | 19 | .748 | 6 | 2022 | 13 | 5 | 2 | .700 | 5 | 2022 |

==== NCAA Tournament Results ====
| Year | School | Opponent | Score |
|---|---|---|---|
| 2012 | Southwestern Oklahoma State | Minot State | W 3–0 |
| 2012 | Southwestern Oklahoma State | Central Missouri | L 0–3 |
| 2015 | Harding | Augustana | L 1–2 |
| 2016 | Harding | Fort Hays State | L 1–3 |
| 2017 | Southwestern Oklahoma State | Missouri Western | W 1–0 |
| 2017 | Southwestern Oklahoma State | Minnesota State–Mankato | T 1–1 (4-2 PK) |
| 2017 | Southwestern Oklahoma State | Central Missouri | L 0–3 |
| 2018 | Oklahoma Baptist | Central Oklahoma | L 0–2 |
| 2019 | Southwestern Oklahoma State | Central Missouri | L 1–3 |

=== Volleyball ===
==== GAC Champions ====
| Year | Season | Tournament |
|---|---|---|
| 2011 | Arkansas Tech | Arkansas Tech |
| 2012 | Harding | Harding |
| 2013 | Harding | Arkansas Tech |
| 2014 | Arkansas Tech | Arkansas Tech |
| 2015 | Arkansas Tech | Southwestern Oklahoma State |
| 2016 | Harding | Southern Nazarene |
| 2017 | Arkansas Tech | Arkansas Tech |
| 2018 | Harding | Harding |
| 2019 | Oklahoma Baptist | Oklahoma Baptist |
| Spring 2021 | West: Oklahoma Baptist; East: Harding | Oklahoma Baptist |
| 2021 | Oklahoma Baptist | Arkansas Tech |
| 2022 | Harding | Harding |
| 2023 | Harding | Oklahoma Baptist |
| 2024 | Southwestern Oklahoma State | Ouachita |
| 2025 | Ouachita | Oklahoma Baptist |

==== GAC All-Time Standings ====
| | Conference | | | | | Tournament | | | | |
| School | W | L | Pct | Titles | Last Title | W | L | Pct | Titles | Last Title |
|---|---|---|---|---|---|---|---|---|---|---|
| Arkansas Tech | 150 | 51 | .746 | 4 | 2017 | 19 | 7 | .731 | 5 | 2021 |
| Arkansas–Monticello | 49 | 137 | .263 | 0 | – | 1 | 6 | .143 | 0 | – |
| East Central | 60 | 126 | .323 | 0 | – | 3 | 6 | .333 | 0 | – |
| Harding | 163 | 39 | .807 | 6 | 2022 | 21 | 9 | .700 | 3 | 2022 |
| Henderson State | 64 | 122 | .344 | 0 | – | 3 | 5 | .375 | 0 | – |
| Northwestern Oklahoma State | 67 | 102 | .396 | 0 | – | 4 | 6 | .400 | 0 | – |
| Oklahoma Baptist | 100 | 28 | .781 | 3 | 2021 | 9 | 4 | .692 | 2 | 2021 |
| Ouachita Baptist | 100 | 93 | .518 | 0 | – | 4 | 11 | .267 | 0 | – |
| Southeastern Oklahoma State | 66 | 124 | .347 | 0 | – | 3 | 9 | .250 | 0 | – |
| Southern Arkansas | 58 | 131 | .307 | 0 | – | 4 | 6 | .400 | 0 | – |
| Southern Nazarene | 106 | 71 | .599 | 0 | – | 8 | 8 | .500 | 1 | 2016 |
| Southwestern Oklahoma State | 118 | 77 | .605 | 0 | – | 9 | 11 | .450 | 1 | 2015 |

==== NCAA Tournament Results ====
| Year | School | Opponent | Score |
|---|---|---|---|
| 2011 | Arkansas Tech | Washburn | L 0–3 |
| 2013 | Arkansas Tech | Minnesota–Duluth | L 0–3 |
| 2014 | Arkansas Tech | Minnesota–Duluth | L 0–3 |
| 2015 | Southwestern Oklahoma State | Concordia–St. Paul | L 0–3 |
| 2016 | Southern Nazarene | Concordia–St. Paul | L 0–3 |

=== Men's Basketball ===
==== GAC Champions ====
| Year | Season | Tournament |
|---|---|---|
| 2012 | Arkansas Tech | Arkansas Tech |
| 2013 | Harding | Ouachita Baptist |
| 2014 | Arkansas Tech | Harding |
| 2015 | Ouachita Baptist | Arkansas Tech |
| 2016 | Harding | Ouachita Baptist |
| 2017 | East Central | East Central |
| 2018 | Southern Nazarene | Southern Nazarene |
| 2019 | Southern Nazarene | Southern Nazarene |
| 2020 | Southern Nazarene | Henderson State |
| 2021 | West: Oklahoma Baptist; East: Arkansas-Monticello | Arkansas-Monticello |
| 2022 | Southeastern Oklahoma State | Southwestern Oklahoma State |

==== GAC All-Time Standings ====
| | Conference | | | | | Tournament | | | | |
| School | W | L | Pct | Titles | Last Title | W | L | Pct | Titles | Last Title |
|---|---|---|---|---|---|---|---|---|---|---|
| Arkansas Tech | 120 | 103 | .538 | 2 | 2014 | 10 | 6 | .625 | 2 | 2015 |
| Arkansas–Monticello | 112 | 112 | .500 | 1 | 2021 | 8 | 7 | .533 | 1 | 2021 |
| East Central | 121 | 104 | .538 | 1 | 2017 | 7 | 8 | .467 | 1 | 2017 |
| Harding | 90 | 132 | .405 | 2 | 2016 | 7 | 6 | .538 | 1 | 2014 |
| Henderson State | 113 | 112 | .502 | 0 | – | 8 | 7 | .533 | 0 | – |
| Northwestern Oklahoma State | 93 | 111 | .456 | 0 | – | 1 | 4 | .200 | 0 | – |
| Oklahoma Baptist | 74 | 75 | .497 | 1 | 2021 | 4 | 4 | .500 | 0 | – |
| Ouachita Baptist | 106 | 116 | .477 | 1 | 2015 | 9 | 7 | .563 | 2 | 2016 |
| Southeastern Oklahoma State | 123 | 102 | .547 | 1 | 2022 | 6 | 9 | .400 | 0 | – |
| Southern Arkansas | 114 | 110 | .509 | 0 | – | 5 | 11 | .313 | 0 | – |
| Southern Nazarene | 138 | 72 | .657 | 3 | 2020 | 9 | 6 | .600 | 2 | 2019 |
| Southwestern Oklahoma State | 85 | 140 | .378 | 0 | – | 7 | 6 | .538 | 1 | 2022 |

==== NCAA Tournament Results ====
| Year | School | Opponent | Score |
|---|---|---|---|
| 2012 | Arkansas Tech | West Texas A&M | W 79–68 |
| 2012 | Arkansas Tech | Tarleton State | W 64–63 |
| 2012 | Arkansas Tech | Midwestern State | L 61–77 |
| 2013 | Arkansas Tech | Minnesota State–Mankato | L 65–81 |
| 2013 | Harding | Central Missouri | W 75–71 |
| 2013 | Harding | Minnesota State–Mankato | L 65–86 |
| 2014 | Arkansas Tech | Central Missouri | L 44–56 |
| 2014 | Harding | Minnesota State–Mankato | L 56–97 |
| 2015 | Arkansas Tech | Augustana College | L 77–104 |
| 2016 | Harding | Augustana | L 85–100 |
| 2016 | Ouachita Baptist | Northwest Missouri State | L 53–78 |
| 2017 | Arkansas Tech | Southwest Minnesota State | L 82–93 |
| 2017 | Arkansas–Monticello | Augustana | L 69–76 |
| 2017 | East Central | Minnesota State–Moorhead | W 115–106 (OT) |
| 2017 | East Central | Southwest Minnesota State | L 70–74 |

=== Women's Basketball ===
==== GAC Champions ====
| Year | Season | Tournament |
|---|---|---|
| 2012 | Arkansas Tech | Southwestern Oklahoma State |
| 2013 | Arkansas Tech | Arkansas Tech |
| 2014 | Harding | Southwestern Oklahoma State |
| 2015 | Harding | Harding |
| 2016 | Arkansas Tech | Arkansas Tech |
| 2017 | Harding | Harding |
| 2018 | Southwestern Oklahoma State | Arkansas Tech |
| 2019 | Southwestern Oklahoma State | Southwestern Oklahoma State |
| 2020 | Southeastern Oklahoma State | Southeastern Oklahoma State |
| 2021 | West: Southwestern Oklahoma State; East: Arkansas Tech | Southern Nazarene |
| 2022 | Southwestern Oklahoma State | Southwestern Oklahoma State |

==== GAC All-Time Standings ====
| | Conference | | | | | Tournament | | | | |
| School | W | L | Pct | Titles | Last Title | W | L | Pct | Titles | Last Title |
|---|---|---|---|---|---|---|---|---|---|---|
| Arkansas Tech | 160 | 61 | .724 | 4 | 2021 | 20 | 8 | .714 | 3 | 2018 |
| Arkansas–Monticello | 67 | 148 | .312 | 0 | – | 3 | 7 | .300 | 0 | – |
| East Central | 119 | 106 | .529 | 0 | – | 5 | 10 | .333 | 0 | – |
| Harding | 157 | 64 | .710 | 3 | 2017 | 16 | 9 | .640 | 2 | 2017 |
| Henderson State | 115 | 105 | .523 | 0 | – | 3 | 9 | .250 | 0 | – |
| Northwestern Oklahoma State | 70 | 139 | .335 | 0 | – | 0 | 3 | .000 | 0 | – |
| Oklahoma Baptist | 46 | 104 | .307 | 0 | – | 0 | 2 | .000 | 0 | – |
| Ouachita Baptist | 78 | 137 | .363 | 0 | – | 2 | 6 | .250 | 0 | – |
| Southeastern Oklahoma State | 122 | 104 | .540 | 1 | 2020 | 7 | 10 | .412 | 1 | 2020 |
| Southern Arkansas | 67 | 153 | .305 | 0 | – | 1 | 5 | .167 | 0 | – |
| Southern Nazarene | 104 | 104 | .500 | 0 | – | 4 | 4 | .500 | 1 | 2021 |
| Southwestern Oklahoma State | 173 | 53 | .765 | 4 | 2022 | 19 | 7 | .731 | 4 | 2022 |

==== NCAA Tournament Results ====
| Year | School | Opponent | Score |
|---|---|---|---|
| 2013 | Arkansas Tech | Minnesota State–Mankato | L 58–72 |
| 2013 | Southwestern Oklahoma State | Central Missouri | W 73–71 |
| 2013 | Southwestern Oklahoma State | Augustana College | L 64–68 |
| 2014 | Harding | Concordia–St. Paul | L 57–68 |
| 2014 | Southwestern Oklahoma State | Emporia State | L 65–97 |
| 2015 | Arkansas Tech | Emporia State | L 51–68 |
| 2015 | Harding | Wayne State College | L 80–87 |
| 2016 | Arkansas Tech | Missouri Western State | W 81–80 |
| 2016 | Arkansas Tech | Pittsburg State | L 80–91 (OT) |
| 2017 | Arkansas Tech | Harding | L 46–59 |
| 2017 | Harding | Arkansas Tech | W 59–46 |
| 2017 | Harding | Central Missouri | W 66–58 |
| 2017 | Harding | Emporia State | W 58–56 |
| 2017 | Harding | Queens College | W 73–69 |
| 2017 | Harding | Ashland | L 77–90 |
| 2018 | Arkansas Tech | Northern State | L 65–76 |
| 2018 | Southwestern Oklahoma State | Fort Hays State | L 75–78 |
| 2019 | Southwestern Oklahoma State | Emporia State | W 71–65 |
| 2019 | Southwestern Oklahoma State | Central Missouri | W 75–72 |
| 2019 | Southwestern Oklahoma State | Fort Hays State | W 88–77 |
| 2019 | Southwestern Oklahoma State | Saint Anselm | W 71–61 |
| 2019 | Southwestern Oklahoma State | Indiana (PA) | W 66–57 |
| 2019 | Southwestern Oklahoma State | Lubbock Christian | L 85–95 (2OT) |
| 2020 | Southeastern Oklahoma State | Tournament cancelled due to COVID-19 | |
| 2020 | Southwestern Oklahoma State | Tournament cancelled due to COVID-19 | |
| 2021 | Southern Nazarene | Texas A&M–Commerce | L 64–70 |
| 2021 | Southwestern Oklahoma State | Texas A&M–Commerce | W 97–79 |
| 2021 | Southwestern Oklahoma State | Lubbock Christian | L 65–78 |

=== Baseball ===
==== GAC Champions ====
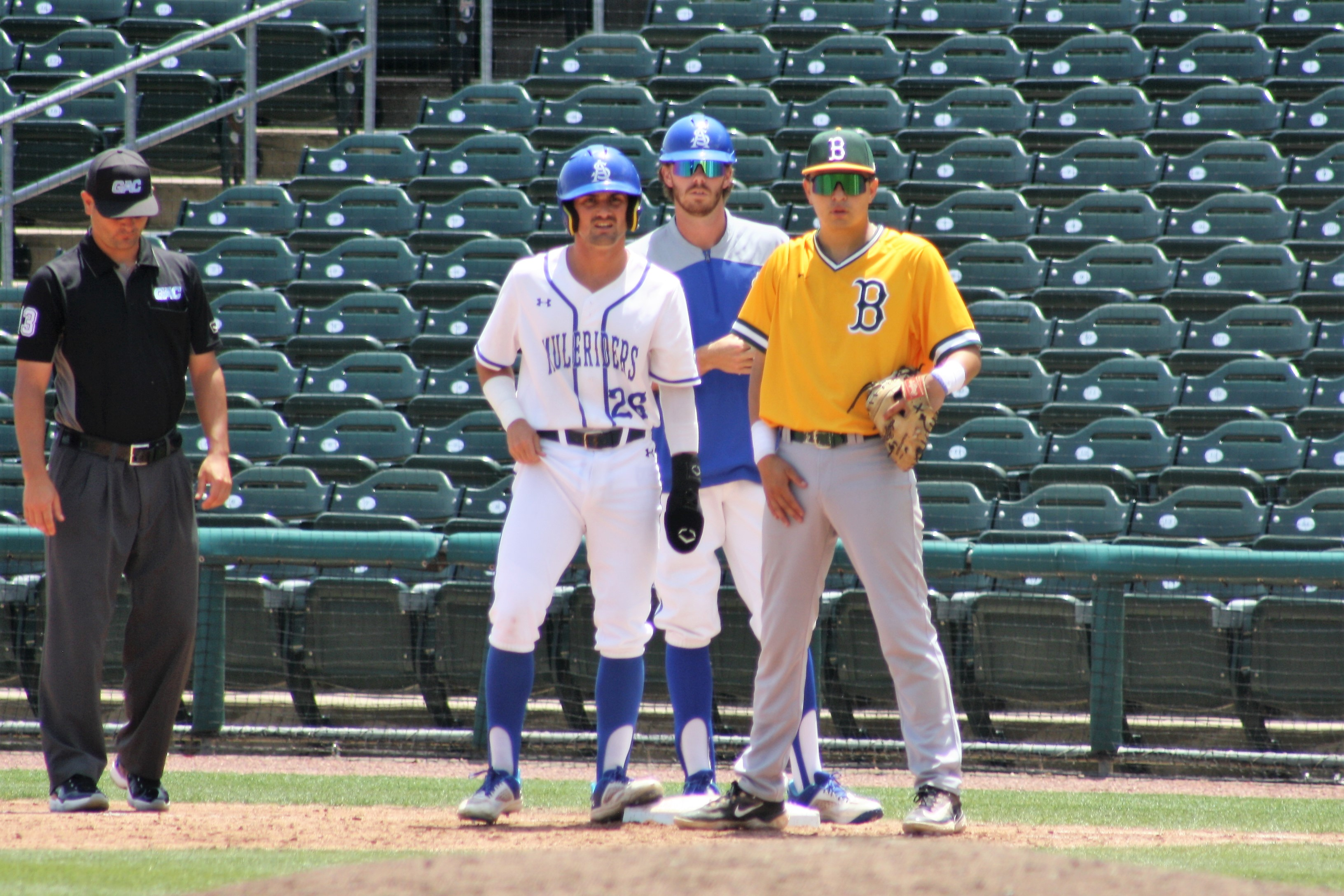
Southern Arkansas and Oklahoma Baptist playing in the 2023 GAC Tournament

| Year | Season | Tournament |
|---|---|---|
| 2012 | Southern Arkansas | Southern Arkansas |
| 2013 | Southern Arkansas | Southern Arkansas |
| 2014 | Arkansas Tech | Southern Arkansas |
| 2015 | Southern Arkansas | Southern Arkansas |
| 2016 | Southwestern Oklahoma State | Arkansas–Monticello |
| 2017 | Southern Arkansas | Arkansas–Monticello |
| 2018 | Arkansas–Monticello | Southern Arkansas |
| 2019 | Arkansas–Monticello | Oklahoma Baptist |
| 2021 | Arkansas Tech | Henderson State |
| 2022 | Southern Arkansas | Southern Arkansas |

==== GAC All-Time Standings ====
| | Conference | | | | | Tournament | | | | |
| School | W | L | Pct | Titles | Last Title | W | L | Pct | Titles | Last Title |
|---|---|---|---|---|---|---|---|---|---|---|
| Arkansas Tech | 225 | 158 | .587 | 2 | 2021 | 15 | 20 | .429 | 0 | – |
| Arkansas–Monticello | 228 | 146 | .610 | 2 | 2019 | 19 | 11 | .633 | 2 | 2017 |
| East Central | 92 | 238 | .279 | 0 | – | 1 | 2 | .333 | 0 | – |
| Harding | 190 | 182 | .511 | 0 | – | 10 | 15 | .400 | 0 | – |
| Henderson State | 203 | 173 | .540 | 0 | – | 19 | 13 | .594 | 1 | 2021 |
| Northwestern Oklahoma State | 117 | 184 | .389 | 0 | – | 0 | 1 | .000 | 0 | – |
| Oklahoma Baptist | 150 | 75 | .667 | 0 | – | 9 | 5 | .643 | 1 | 2019 |
| Ouachita Baptist | 163 | 207 | .441 | 0 | – | 8 | 10 | .444 | 0 | – |
| Southeastern Oklahoma State | 171 | 161 | .515 | 0 | – | 6 | 11 | .353 | 0 | – |
| Southern Arkansas | 277 | 120 | .698 | 5 | 2022 | 27 | 12 | .692 | 6 | 2022 |
| Southern Nazarene | 56 | 241 | .189 | 0 | – | 0 | 0 | – | 0 | – |
| Southwestern Oklahoma State | 174 | 161 | .519 | 1 | 2016 | 1 | 15 | .063 | 0 | – |

==== NCAA Tournament Results ====
| Year | School | Opponent | Score |
|---|---|---|---|
| 2012 | Southern Arkansas | Angelo State | W 7–2 |
| 2012 | Southern Arkansas | St. Mary's | L 5–2 |
| 2012 | Southern Arkansas | Central Missouri | L 3–4 |
| 2013 | Southern Arkansas | Missouri Western State | W 6–1 |
| 2013 | Southern Arkansas | St. Cloud State | L 1–2 |
| 2013 | Southern Arkansas | Central Missouri | W 4–1 |
| 2013 | Southern Arkansas | St. Cloud State | L 4–5 |
| 2014 | Arkansas Tech | Augustana College | W 4–2 |
| 2014 | Arkansas Tech | Emporia State | L 2–3 |
| 2014 | Arkansas Tech | Southern Arkansas | W 5–0 |
| 2014 | Arkansas Tech | Minnesota State–Mankato | L 2–5 |
| 2014 | Arkansas–Monticello | Southern Arkansas | L 4–11 |
| 2014 | Arkansas–Monticello | Augustana College | L 6–8 |
| 2014 | Southern Arkansas | Arkansas–Monticello | W 11–4 |
| 2014 | Southern Arkansas | Minnesota State–Mankato | L 3–6 |
| 2014 | Southern Arkansas | Arkansas Tech | L 0–5 |
| 2015 | Henderson State | St. Cloud State | W 10–4 |
| 2015 | Henderson State | Emporia State | W 4–2 |
| 2015 | Henderson State | Minnesota State–Mankato | W 9–6 |
| 2015 | Henderson State | St. Cloud State | W 8–7 (10) |
| 2015 | Henderson State | Angelo State | W 4–0 |
| 2015 | Henderson State | Catawba College | L 1–5 |
| 2015 | Henderson State | Angelo State | W 4–1 |
| 2015 | Henderson State | Tampa | L 2–5 |
| 2015 | Southern Arkansas | Emporia State | W 9–2 |
| 2015 | Southern Arkansas | Minnesota State–Mankato | L 2–7 |
| 2015 | Southern Arkansas | St. Cloud State | L 0–4 |
| 2016 | Arkansas–Monticello | Missouri Western State | W 15–0 |
| 2016 | Arkansas–Monticello | Minnesota State–Mankato | L 6–7 |
| 2016 | Arkansas–Monticello | Southwestern Oklahoma State | W 2–1 (10) |
| 2016 | Arkansas–Monticello | Emporia State | W 18–7 |
| 2016 | Arkansas–Monticello | Minnesota State–Mankato | W 13–6 |
| 2016 | Arkansas–Monticello | Central Missouri | L 4–7 |
| 2016 | Southwestern Oklahoma State | Central Missouri | L 1–3 |
| 2016 | Southwestern Oklahoma State | Minnesota–Duluth | W 6–3 |
| 2016 | Southwestern Oklahoma State | Arkansas–Monticello | L 1–2 (10) |
| 2017 | Arkansas–Monticello | Emporia State | L 8–10 |
| 2017 | Arkansas–Monticello | Southern Arkansas | W 5–4 |
| 2017 | Arkansas–Monticello | Minnesota State–Mankato | L 5–6 |
| 2017 | Southern Arkansas | Lindenwood | L 7–14 |
| 2017 | Southern Arkansas | Arkansas–Monticello | L 4–5 |

=== Men's Golf ===
==== GAC Champions ====
| Year | School | Individual |
|---|---|---|
| 2012 | Southwestern Oklahoma State | Matt Jennings (HSU) |
| 2013 | Arkansas Tech | Brian Belz (ATU) |
| 2014 | Henderson State | Michael Hearne (SNU) |
| 2015 | Henderson State | Drew Greenwood (HSU) |
| 2016 | Henderson State | Brice Howard (HSU) |
| 2017 | Henderson State | Nick Shapiro (HSU) |

==== NCAA Championships Results ====
| Year | School / Individual | Finish |
|---|---|---|
| 2013 | Southwestern Oklahoma State | 19th |
| 2014 | Marcos Sevilla Suarez (SOSU) | T 38th |
| 2015 | Southwestern Oklahoma State | 18th |
| 2015 | Michael Hearne (SNU) | T 4th |
| 2016 | Southeastern Oklahoma State | 15th |
| 2016 | Bryce Burke (ATU) | T 81st |
| 2017 | Arkansas Tech | 8th |
| 2017 | Arkansas Tech; Medal Match Play: Opponent / Score; Barry / W 2–2–1 (6–5); Lynn / L 2–3 | |

=== Women's Golf ===
==== GAC Champions ====
| Year | School | Individual |
|---|---|---|
| 2012 | Harding | Rebecka Surtevall (ATU) |
| 2013 | Harding | Kendall Earp (HSU) |
| 2014 | Henderson State | Rebecka Surtevall (ATU) |
| 2015 | Arkansas Tech | Brittany Marquez (HU) |
| 2016 | Arkansas Tech | Pia Nunbhakdi (ATU) |
| 2017 | Arkansas Tech | Elin Wahlin (SWOSU) |

==== NCAA Championships Results ====
| Year | School / Individual | Finish |
|---|---|---|
| 2013 | Rebecka Surtevall (ATU) | T 12th |
| 2013 | Ashlynn Hall (SWOSU) | T 39th |
| 2013 | Emily Plyler (HU) | T 49th |
| 2014 | Arkansas Tech | 9th |
| 2014 | Southwestern Oklahoma State | 12th |
| 2015 | Arkansas Tech | 10th |
| 2016 | Caroline Fredensborg (ATU) | T 39th |
| 2017 | Henderson State | T 9th |
| 2017 | Arkansas Tech | 11th |

=== Softball ===
==== GAC Champions ====
| Year | Season | Tournament |
|---|---|---|
| 2012 | Arkansas–Monticello | Arkansas–Monticello |
| 2013 | Southeastern Oklahoma State | Southeastern Oklahoma State |
| 2014 | Southeastern Oklahoma State | Southern Arkansas |
| 2015 | Henderson State | East Central |
| 2016 | Arkansas Tech | Southern Arkansas |
| 2017 | Harding | Harding |
| 2018 | Southern Arkansas | Arkansas Tech |
| 2019 | Southern Arkansas | Arkansas Tech |
| 2021 | Southern Arkansas | Arkansas Tech |
| 2022 | Arkansas Tech | Arkansas Tech |

==== GAC All-Time Standings ====
| | Conference | | | | | Tournament | | | | |
| School | W | L | Pct | Titles | Last Title | W | L | Pct | Titles | Last Title |
|---|---|---|---|---|---|---|---|---|---|---|
| Arkansas Tech | 251 | 129 | .661 | 2 | 2022 | 21 | 12 | .636 | 4 | 2022 |
| Arkansas–Monticello | 176 | 194 | .476 | 1 | 2012 | 8 | 12 | .400 | 1 | 2012 |
| East Central | 193 | 181 | .516 | 0 | – | 9 | 14 | .391 | 1 | 2015 |
| Harding | 203 | 121 | .627 | 1 | 2017 | 14 | 11 | .560 | 1 | 2017 |
| Henderson State | 184 | 202 | .477 | 1 | 2015 | 15 | 14 | .517 | 0 | – |
| Northwestern Oklahoma State | 118 | 236 | .333 | 0 | – | 0 | 0 | – | 0 | – |
| Oklahoma Baptist | 97 | 145 | .401 | 0 | – | 0 | 2 | .000 | 0 | – |
| Ouachita Baptist | 138 | 243 | .362 | 0 | – | 4 | 13 | .235 | 0 | – |
| Southeastern Oklahoma State | 238 | 136 | .636 | 2 | 2014 | 18 | 13 | .581 | 1 | 2013 |
| Southern Arkansas | 267 | 111 | .706 | 3 | 2021 | 22 | 15 | .595 | 2 | 2016 |
| Southern Nazarene | 161 | 187 | .463 | 0 | – | 9 | 11 | .450 | 0 | – |
| Southwestern Oklahoma State | 120 | 263 | .313 | 0 | – | 2 | 5 | .286 | 0 | – |

==== NCAA Tournament Results ====
| Year | School | Opponent | Score |
|---|---|---|---|
| 2013 | Southeastern Oklahoma State | Winona State | L 3–11 (6) |
| 2013 | Southeastern Oklahoma State | Augustana College | W 4–3 |
| 2013 | Southeastern Oklahoma State | Minnesota State–Mankato | L 0–8 |
| 2014 | Southeastern Oklahoma State | Minnesota State–Mankato | W 5–3 |
| 2014 | Southeastern Oklahoma State | Central Oklahoma | W 5–4 |
| 2014 | Southeastern Oklahoma State | Emporia State | L 2–7 |
| 2014 | Southeastern Oklahoma State | Emporia State | W 6–2 |
| 2014 | Southeastern Oklahoma State | Augustana College | W 13–12 |
| 2014 | Southeastern Oklahoma State | Augustana College | W 5–4 |
| 2014 | Southeastern Oklahoma State | Dixie State | L 2–3 |
| 2014 | Southeastern Oklahoma State | Wayne State | W 2–0 |
| 2014 | Southeastern Oklahoma State | Armstrong Atlantic State | W 9–3 |
| 2014 | Southeastern Oklahoma State | Valdosta State | L 3–5 |
| 2014 | Southern Arkansas | Winona State | L 2–3 |
| 2014 | Southern Arkansas | Missouri Western State | L 0–5 |
| 2015 | Arkansas Tech | Henderson State | L 1–9 (6) |
| 2015 | Arkansas Tech | Missouri Western State | W 4–1 |
| 2015 | Arkansas Tech | Henderson State | L 0–2 |
| 2015 | East Central | Augustana College | L 2–4 |
| 2015 | East Central | Winona State | W 5–2 (8) |
| 2015 | East Central | Central Oklahoma | W 4–1 |
| 2015 | East Central | Augustana College | L 1–4 |
| 2015 | Henderson State | Arkansas Tech | W 9–1 (6) |
| 2015 | Henderson State | Central Missouri | L 2–4 |
| 2015 | Henderson State | Arkansas Tech | W 2–0 |
| 2015 | Henderson State | Central Missouri | L 0–2 |
| 2016 | Arkansas Tech | Upper Iowa | W 6–0 |
| 2016 | Arkansas Tech | Minnesota State–Mankato | W 2–0 (11) |
| 2016 | Arkansas Tech | Upper Iowa | W 1–0 |
| 2016 | Arkansas Tech | Southern Arkansas | L 1–2 (8) |
| 2016 | Arkansas Tech | Southern Arkansas | L 1–4 |
| 2016 | Southern Arkansas | Central Oklahoma | W 2–0 |
| 2016 | Southern Arkansas | Missouri Western State | W 6–0 |
| 2016 | Southern Arkansas | Missouri Western State | W 13–5 (5) |
| 2016 | Southern Arkansas | Arkansas Tech | W 2–1 (8) |
| 2016 | Southern Arkansas | Arkansas Tech | W 4–1 |
| 2016 | Southern Arkansas | North Alabama | L 0–9 (5) |
| 2016 | Southern Arkansas | Charleston | W 7–0 |
| 2016 | Southern Arkansas | West Texas A&M | W 7–4 |
| 2016 | Southern Arkansas | North Alabama | L 2–10 (5) |
| 2017 | Harding | Missouri Western State | W 8–0 (5) |
| 2017 | Harding | Southern Arkansas | W 7–2 |
| 2017 | Harding | Winona State | L 2–3 |
| 2017 | Harding | Winona State | W 4–3 |
| 2017 | Harding | Minnesota State-Mankato | L 0–1 (10) |
| 2017 | Harding | Minnesota State-Mankato | W 3–2 |
| 2017 | Harding | Minnesota State-Mankato | L 6–7 |
| 2017 | Southern Arkansas | Winona State | W 5–0 |
| 2017 | Southern Arkansas | Harding | L 2–7 |
| 2017 | Southern Arkansas | Winona State | L 3–4 |

=== Men's Tennis ===
==== GAC Champions ====
| Year | Season | Tournament |
|---|---|---|
| 2012 | Ouachita Baptist | Ouachita Baptist |
| 2013 | Ouachita Baptist | Ouachita Baptist |
| 2014 | Southeastern Oklahoma State | Ouachita Baptist |
| 2015 | Southeastern Oklahoma State | Ouachita Baptist |
| 2016 | Ouachita Baptist | Southeastern Oklahoma State |
| 2017 | Oklahoma Baptist | Oklahoma Baptist |

==== GAC All-Time Standings ====
| | Conference | | | | | Tournament | | | | |
| School | W | L | Pct | Titles | Last Title | W | L | Pct | Titles | Last Title |
|---|---|---|---|---|---|---|---|---|---|---|
| East Central | 6 | 10 | .375 | 0 | – | 4 | 5 | .444 | 0 | – |
| Harding | 4 | 15 | .211 | 0 | – | 0 | 6 | .000 | 0 | – |
| Oklahoma Baptist | 3 | 4 | .429 | 1 | 2017 | 2 | 0 | 1.000 | 1 | 2017 |
| Ouachita Baptist | 14 | 5 | .737 | 3 | 2016 | 9 | 2 | .818 | 4 | 2015 |
| Southeastern Oklahoma State | 13 | 6 | .684 | 2 | 2015 | 3 | 5 | .375 | 1 | 2016 |

==== NCAA Tournament Results ====
| Year | School | Opponent | Score |
|---|---|---|---|
| 2012 | Ouachita Baptist | St. Edward's | W 5–3 |
| 2012 | Ouachita Baptist | Bluefield State College | W 5–0 |
| 2012 | Ouachita Baptist | West Florida | L 1–6 |
| 2013 | Ouachita Baptist | Southwest Baptist | L 2–5 |
| 2015 | Ouachita Baptist | West Florida | L 0–5 |
| 2016 | Southeastern Oklahoma State | Nebraska–Kearney | W 5–3 |
| 2016 | Southeastern Oklahoma State | Midwestern State | L 2–5 |

=== Women's Tennis ===
==== GAC Champions ====
| Year | Season | Tournament |
|---|---|---|
| 2012 | Arkansas Tech | Arkansas Tech |
| 2013 | Arkansas Tech | East Central |
| 2014 | Harding | Harding |
| 2015 | Southeastern Oklahoma State | East Central |
| 2016 | Oklahoma Baptist | Southeastern Oklahoma State |
| 2017 | Southeastern Oklahoma State | Southeastern Oklahoma State |

==== GAC All-Time Standings ====
| | Conference | | | | | Tournament | | | | |
| School | W | L | Pct | Titles | Last Title | W | L | Pct | Titles | Last Title |
|---|---|---|---|---|---|---|---|---|---|---|
| Arkansas Tech | 28 | 9 | .757 | 2 | 2013 | 6 | 5 | .545 | 1 | 2012 |
| East Central | 20 | 11 | .645 | 0 | – | 9 | 3 | .750 | 2 | 2015 |
| Harding | 23 | 14 | .622 | 1 | 2014 | 6 | 5 | .545 | 1 | 2014 |
| Henderson State | 9 | 27 | .250 | 0 | – | 1 | 6 | .143 | 0 | – |
| Oklahoma Baptist | 11 | 1 | .917 | 1 | 2016 | 0 | 0 | – | 0 | – |
| Ouachita Baptist | 3 | 34 | .081 | 0 | – | 0 | 4 | .000 | 0 | – |
| Southeastern Oklahoma State | 25 | 11 | .694 | 1 | 2015 | 7 | 4 | .636 | 1 | 2016 |
| Southern Arkansas | 0 | 6 | .000 | 0 | – | 0 | 1 | .000 | 0 | – |
| Southern Nazarene | 12 | 18 | .400 | 0 | – | 2 | 3 | .400 | 0 | – |

==== NCAA Tournament Results ====
| Year | School | Opponent | Score |
|---|---|---|---|
| 2014 | Arkansas Tech | Harding | W 5–4 |
| 2014 | Arkansas Tech | Southwest Baptist | L 1–5 |
| 2014 | Harding | Arkansas Tech | L 4–5 |
| 2015 | Arkansas Tech | East Central | W 5–1 |
| 2015 | Arkansas Tech | Southwest Baptist | L 1–5 |
| 2015 | East Central | Arkansas Tech | L 1–5 |
| 2016 | Southeastern Oklahoma State | Nebraska–Kearney | W 5–4 |
| 2016 | Southeastern Oklahoma State | Northeastern State | L 1–5 |
| 2017 | Southeastern Oklahoma State | Augustana | W 5–0 |
| 2017 | Southeastern Oklahoma State | Southwest Baptist | W 5–2 |
| 2017 | Southeastern Oklahoma State | New York Tech | W 5–2 |
| 2017 | Southeastern Oklahoma State | Hawai'i Pacific | L 0–5 |

=== Track & Field Outdoor ===
==== GAC Champions ====
| Year | Men | Women |
|---|---|---|
| 2016 | Harding | Harding |
| 2017 | Harding | Harding |
