= List of Henderson State Reddies head football coaches =

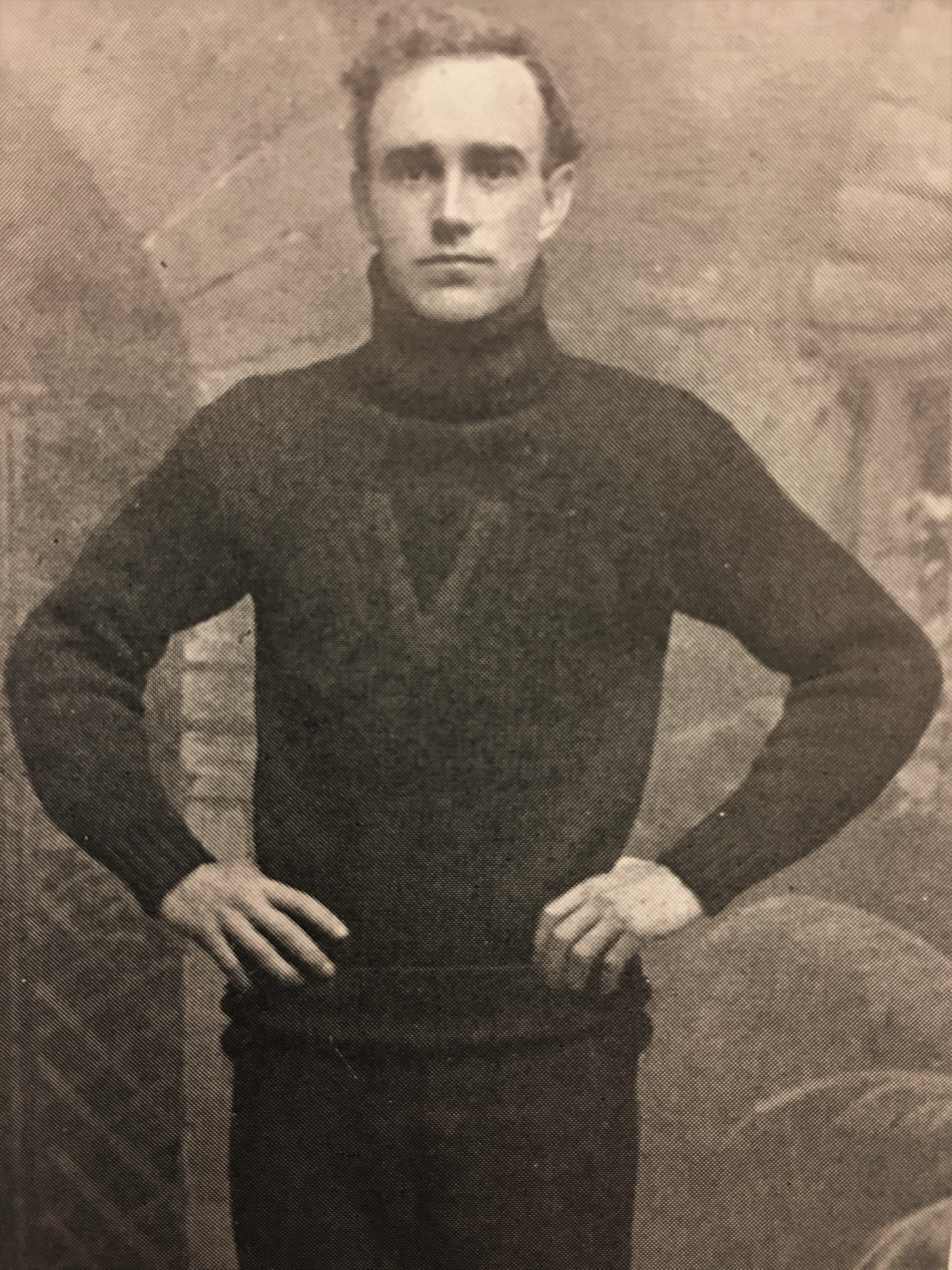
Jimmy R. Haygood played quarterback for Vanderbilt before leading the Reddies for almost two decades.

The Henderson State Reddies college football team represents Henderson State University in the Great American Conference (GAC). The Reddies compete in Division II of the National Collegiate Athletic Association (NCAA). The program has had 19 head coaches since it began play in 1905.

The team has played 1,028 games in 116 seasons of Reddie football. In that time, Scott Maxfield led the Reddies to four postseason bowl games. Seven coaches have won conference championships: Bo Rowland, Bo Sherman, Duke Wells, Jim Mack Sawyer, Clyde Berry, Sporty Carpenter, and Scott Maxfield. Jimmy Haygood also claimed four Arkansas state championships.

Scott Maxfield is the leader in seasons coached and games won, with 134 victories during his 19 years at Henderson. J.H. Lassiter has the highest winning percentage with .833. Patrick Nix has the lowest winning percentage with .136.

The current head coach is Greg Holsworth, who was hired in 2024.

== Key ==
Key to symbols in coaches list
General		Overall		Conference		Postseason (Note: Although the first Rose Bowl Game was played in 1902, it has been continuously played since the 1916 game, and is recognized as the oldest bowl game by the NCAA. "—" indicates any season prior to 1916 when postseason games were not played.)	
No.	Order of coaches (Note: A running total of the number of head coaches, with coaches who served separate tenures being counted only once. Interim head coaches are represented with "Int" and are not counted in the running total. "—" indicates the team played but either without a coach or no coach is on record. "X" indicates an interim year without play.)	GC	Games coached	CW	Conference wins	PW	Postseason wins
DC	Division championships	OW	Overall wins	CL	Conference losses	PL	Postseason losses
CC	Conference championships	OL	Overall losses	CT	Conference ties	PT	Postseason ties
NC	National championships	OT	Overall ties (Note: Overtime rules in college football were introduced in 1996, making ties impossible in the period since.)	C%	Conference winning percentage		
†	Elected to the College Football Hall of Fame	O%	Overall winning percentage (Note: When computing the win–loss percentage, a tie counts as half a win and half a loss.)				

== Coaches ==
List of Head Football Coaches and Statistics
No.	Name	Term	GC	OW	OL	OT	O%	PW	PL	PT	CC	NC	Awards
1	J.B. Webster	1905	3	2	1	0	0.667	—	—	—	0	0	—
2	J.H. Lassiter	1906	3	2	0	1	0.883	—	—	—	0	0	—
3	Jimmy R. Haygood	1907–1918 (Note: The college yearbooks contradict these official dates in at least three places. The 1916 yearbook describes Latin professor, women's basketball coach, and assistant football coach R.T. Proctor having to assume athletic director duties and get the football team into shape. The 1917 yearbook says that "coach [Haygood] was back at his old job last year [1916 football season]". The 1918 yearbook lists Dean of Men and former assistant coach John Wesley Rogers as athletic director and head football and baseball coach.); 1920–1924	110	49	52	9	0.486	—	—	—	0	0	—
4	Bill Watson	1919	6	1	4	1	0.250	—	—	—	0	0	—
5	Bo Rowland	1925–1930	53	39	10	4	0.774	—	—	—	4	0	—
6	Bo Sherman	1931–1934	28	21	7	0	0.750	—	—	—	3	0	—
7	Solon B. Sudduth	1935–1938	32	8	22	2	0.281	—	—	—	0	0	—
8	Lloyd Grow	1939	9	4	4	1	0.500	—	—	—	0	0	—
9	Tom Murphy	1940	9	3	5	1	0.389	0	0	0	0	0	—
10	Duke Wells	1941–1961	162	73	78	11	0.484	0	0	0	2	0	—
11	Jim Mac Sawyer	1962–1966	48	19	26	3	0.427	0	0	0	1	0	—
12	Clyde Berry	1967–1970	40	26	14	0	0.650	0	0	0	1	0	—
13	Sporty Carpenter	1971–1989	200	119	76	5	0.608	0	0	0	5	0	—
14	Ken Turner	1990–1993	41	17	21	3	0.451	0	0	0	0	0	—
15	Ronnie Kerr	1994–1998	54	19	34	1	0.361	0	0	0	0	0	—
16	Patrick Nix	1999–2000	22	3	19	—	0.136	0	0	—	0	0	—
17	Jesse Branch	2001–2004	43	12	31	—	0.279	0	0	—	0	0	—
18	Scott Maxfield	2005–2023	199	134	65	—	0.673	1	4	—	4	0	(Note: 2010 Gulf South Conference Coach of the Year 2012 & 2013 Liberty Mutual AFCA/National Coach of the Year Finalist 2012 & 2013 Great American Conference Coach of the Year 2013 AFCA Super Region 3 Coach of the Year)
19	Greg Holsworth	2024–present	22	16	6	—	0.727	0	0	—	0	0	—
