= Bo Rowland =

Biographical details
- Born: March 20, 1903; Arkadelphia, Arkansas, U.S.
- Died: September 23, 1964 (aged 61); Little Rock, Arkansas, U.S.

Playing career

Football
- 1919–1921: Henderson-Brown
- 1923–1924: Vanderbilt
- Position: End

Coaching career (HC unless noted)

Football
- 1925–1930: Henderson-Brown
- 1931: Ouachita Baptist
- 1932–1934: Oklahoma (assistant)
- 1935: Syracuse (assistant)
- 1936–1939: Cornell (assistant)
- 1940–1942: The Citadel
- 1946–1947: Oklahoma City
- 1948–1951: George Washington

Basketball
- 1925–1931: Henderson-Brown
- 1936–1938: Cornell

Administrative career (AD unless noted)
- 1940–1945: The Citadel

Head coaching record
- Overall: 90–47–7 (football); 40–58 (basketball)

Accomplishments and honors

Championships
- Football; 3 Arkansas Association (1927–1929); 1 AIC (1930)

Awards
- Arkansas Sports Hall of Fame

John Howell "Bo" Rowland (March 20, 1903 – September 23, 1964) was an American football player and coach of football and basketball. He served as the head football coach at Henderson-Brown College—now Henderson State University (1925–1930), Ouachita Baptist University (1931), The Citadel (1940–1942), Oklahoma City University (1946–1947), and George Washington University (1948–1951), compiling a career college football coaching record of 90–47–7. Rowland was also the head basketball coach at Henderson-Brown from 1925 to 1931 and at Cornell University from 1936 to 1938, tallying a career college basketball coaching mark of 40–58. Rowland died at the age of 61 on September 23, 1964, at a hospital in Little Rock, Arkansas. He was inducted into the Arkansas Sports Hall of Fame in 1968.

== Head coaching record ==
=== Football ===
Year	Team	Overall	Conference	Standing
Henderson-Brown Reddies (Independent) (1925–1926)
1925	Henderson-Brown	5–5–1		
1926	Henderson-Brown	5–3		
Henderson-Brown / Henderson State Reddies (Arkansas Association) (1927–1929)
1927	Henderson-Brown	7–0–1		
1928	Henderson-Brown	8–0–1		
1929	Henderson State	6–1–1	3–1	
Henderson State Reddies (Arkansas Intercollegiate Conference) (1930)
1930	Henderson State	8–1	5–0	1st
Henderson State:		39–10–4		
Ouachita Baptist Tigers (Arkansas Intercollegiate Conference) (1931)
1931	Ouachita Baptist	6–2–1		
Ouachita Baptist:		6–2–1		
The Citadel Bulldogs (Southern Conference) (1940–1942)
1940	The Citadel	4–5	0–4	15th
1941	The Citadel	4–3–1	0–2–1	14th
1942	The Citadel	5–2	2–2	T–7th
The Citadel:		13–10–1	2–8–1	
Oklahoma City Chiefs (Independent) (1946–1947)
1946	Oklahoma City	10–1		
1947	Oklahoma City	7–3		
Oklahoma City:		17–4		
George Washington Colonials (Southern Conference) (1948–1951)
1948	George Washington	4–6	2–4	T–10th
1949	George Washington	4–5	2–3	12th
1950	George Washington	5–4	4–3	8th
1951	George Washington	2–6–1	2–3–1	9th
George Washington:		15–21–1	10–13–1	
Total:		90–47–7		
National championship Conference title Conference division title or championship game berth
