= 2024 Ouachita Baptist Tigers football team =

American college football season

2024 Ouachita Baptist Tigers football

GAC co-champion

NCAA Division II First Round, L 31–38^{OT} vs. Central Oklahoma
- Conference: Great American Conference

Ranking
- AFCA: No. 14
- Record: 10–2 (10–1 GAC)
- Head coach: Todd Knight (25th season)
- Offensive coordinator: Jay Derby (20th season)
- Offensive scheme: Pro spread
- Defensive coordinator: Roy Thompson Jr. (6th season)
- Base defense: 4–3
- Home stadium: Benson–Williams Field at Cliff Harris Stadium

2024 Great American Conference football standings
| | Conf. | | | Overall |
| Team | W | | L | W | | L |
|---|---|---|---|---|---|---|
| No. 4 Harding +^ | 10 | – | 1 | 12 | – | 2 |
| No. 14 Ouachita Baptist +^ | 10 | – | 1 | 10 | – | 2 |
| Southern Arkansas | 9 | – | 2 | 9 | – | 2 |
| Henderson State | 8 | – | 3 | 8 | – | 3 |
| Arkansas Tech | 5 | – | 6 | 5 | – | 6 |
| East Central | 5 | – | 6 | 5 | – | 6 |
| SE Oklahoma State | 5 | – | 6 | 5 | – | 6 |
| Arkansas–Monticello | 4 | – | 7 | 4 | – | 7 |
| Southern Nazarene | 3 | – | 8 | 3 | – | 8 |
| SW Oklahoma State | 3 | – | 8 | 3 | – | 8 |
| NW Oklahoma State | 2 | – | 9 | 2 | – | 9 |
| Oklahoma Baptist | 2 | – | 9 | 2 | – | 9 |
+ – Conference co-champions; ^ – NCAA Division II playoff participant; Rankings from AFCA poll

The 2024 Ouachita Baptist Tigers football team represented Ouachita Baptist University during the 2024 NCAA Division II football season as a member of the Great American Conference (GAC). Led by twenty-fifth year head coach Todd Knight, the Tigers played their home games at Benson–Williams Field at Cliff Harris Stadium in Arkadelphia, Arkansas. Knight was named the American Football Coaches Association Regional Coach of the Year for Region 4.

The Tigers finished the regular season with a record of 10–1, clinching a share of the GAC title. The Tigers were selected for the Division II Playoffs, falling to Central Oklahoma 31–38 in overtime in the first round.

== Preseason ==
The GAC released its preseason prediction poll on August 1, 2024. The Tigers were predicted to finish second in the conference, though they also received one first place vote.

== Schedule ==
| Date | Time | Opponent | Rank | Site | Result | Attendance |
|---|---|---|---|---|---|---|
| September 5 | 7:00 p.m. | SW Oklahoma State | No. 19 | Cliff Harris Stadium; Arkadelphia, AR | W 42–3 | 3,582 |
| September 12 | 6:00 p.m. | at NW Oklahoma State | No. 18 | Ranger Field; Alva, OK | W 56–2 | 1,834 |
| September 21 | 6:00 p.m. | at Southern Arkansas | No. 17 | Wilkins Stadium; Magnolia, AR | W 25–20 | 6,869 |
| September 28 | 6:00 p.m. | Arkansas–Monticello | No. 16 | Cliff Harris Stadium; Arkadelphia, AR | W 49–14 | 3,452 |
| October 5 | 2:00 p.m. | at SE Oklahoma State | No. 14 | Paul Laird Field; Durant, OK | W 25–9 | 2,543 |
| October 12 | 12:00 p.m. | East Central^{†} | No. 10 | Cliff Harris Stadium; Arkadelphia, AR | W 40–0 | 5,875 |
| October 19 | 7:00 p.m. | No. 1 Harding | No. 9 | Cliff Harris Stadium; Arkadelphia, AR | W 17–13 | 7,322 |
| October 26 | 2:00 p.m. | at Arkansas Tech | No. 5 | Thone Stadium; Russellville, AR | W 38–7 | 2,871 |
| October 31 | 6:00 p.m. | Southern Nazarene | No. 3 | Cliff Harris Stadium; Arkadelphia, AR | L 17–18 | 1,581 |
| November 9 | 2:00 p.m. | at Oklahoma Baptist | No. 9 | Crain Family Stadium; Shawnee, OK | W 55–0 | 2,226 |
| November 16 | 11:00 a.m. | at Henderson State | No. 9 | Carpenter–Haygood Stadium; Arkadelphia, AR (Battle of the Ravine) | W 27–20 | 9,736 |
| November 23 | 1:00 p.m. | at No. 8 Central Oklahoma* | No. 9 | Chad Richison Stadium; Edmond, OK (NCAA Division II First Round) | L 31–38 ^{OT} | 3,995 |
*Non-conference game; ^{†}Homecoming; Rankings from AFCA Poll released prior to the game; All times are in Central time

== Rankings ==
Ranking movements Legend: ██ Increase in ranking ██ Decrease in ranking ( ) = First-place votes
| | Week | | | | | | | | | | | | | |
| Poll | Pre | 1 | 2 | 3 | 4 | 5 | 6 | 7 | 8 | 9 | 10 | 11 | 12 | Final |
|---|---|---|---|---|---|---|---|---|---|---|---|---|---|---|
| AFCA | 19 | 19* | 18 | 17 | 16 | 14 | 10 | 9 | 5 | 3 (2) | 9 | 9 | 9 | 14 |
| D2 Football | 17 | 17 | 17 | 16 | 16 | 14 | 12 | 11 | 7 | 5 | 12 | 12 | 11 | 15 |

* A new poll was not released for this week, so for comparison purposes, the previous week's ranking is inserted in this week's slot.

== Game summaries ==
=== SW Oklahoma State ===
Southwestern Oklahoma State Bulldogs at No. 19 Ouachita Baptist Tigers – Game summary

| Quarter | 1 | 2 | 3 | 4 | Total |
|---|---|---|---|---|---|
| Bulldogs | 0 | 0 | 0 | 3 | 3 |
| No. 19 Tigers | 7 | 21 | 14 | 0 | 42 |

at Cliff Harris Stadium, Arkadelphia, Arkansas

- Date: September 5
- Game time: 7:00 p.m. CDT
- Game weather: Cloudy, 82 °F (28 °C)
- Game attendance: 3,582
- Referee: Darin Lair
- Box score, Recap

Game information
First quarter
- OUA – Chris Henley Jr. 73-yard pass from Eli Livingston (Jax Daggers kick), 0:44. Tigers 7–0. Drive: 2 plays, 73 yards, 0:18.

Second quarter

- OUA – Kendel Givens 3-yard run (Jax Daggers kick), 8:16. Tigers 14–0. Drive: 6 plays, 53 yards, 3:04.
- OUA – Carter McElhany 54-yard pass from Eli Livingston (Jax Daggers kick), 5:44. Tigers 21–0. Drive: 2 plays, 63 yards, 0:27.
- OUA – Garrison Jackson 4-yard pass from Eli Livingston (Jax Daggers kick), 1:20. Tigers 28–0. Drive: 6 plays, 53 yards, 3:12.

Third quarter

- OUA – Eli Livingston 8-yard run (Jax Daggers kick), 13:40. Tigers 35–0. Drive: 2 plays, 21 yards, 0:39.
- OUA – Kendel Givens 1-yard run (Jax Daggers kick), 9:46. Tigers 42–0. Drive: 3 plays, 5 yards, 1:38.

Fourth quarter

- SWO – Ethan McBee 25-yard field goal, 11:08. Tigers 42–3. Drive: 7 plays, 15 yards, 3:01.

| Statistics | SWO | OUA |
|---|---|---|
| First downs | 17 | 15 |
| Total yards | 247 | 334 |
| Rushing yards | 97 | 128 |
| Passing yards | 150 | 206 |
| Turnovers | 3 | 3 |
| Time of possession | 39:45 | 20:15 |

| Team | Category | Player | Statistics |
|---|---|---|---|
| SW Oklahoma State | Passing | Kai Kunz | 13/21, 94 yards, INT |
| SW Oklahoma State | Rushing | Kai Kunz | 15 rushes, 85 yards |
| SW Oklahoma State | Receiving | Baylor Nash | 6 receptions, 48 yards |
| Ouachita Baptist | Passing | Eli Livingston | 8/10, 195 yards, 3 TD |
| Ouachita Baptist | Rushing | Eli Livingston | 9 rushes, 91 yards, TD |
| Ouachita Baptist | Receiving | Chris Henley Jr. | 1 reception, 73 yards, TD |

=== at NW Oklahoma State ===
No. 18 Ouachita Baptist Tigers at Northwestern Oklahoma State Rangers – Game summary

| Quarter | 1 | 2 | 3 | 4 | Total |
|---|---|---|---|---|---|
| No. 18 Tigers | 7 | 14 | 21 | 14 | 56 |
| Rangers | 0 | 2 | 0 | 0 | 2 |

at Ranger Field, Alva, Oklahoma

- Date: September 12
- Game time: 6:00 p.m. CDT
- Game weather: Sunny
- Game attendance: 1,834
- Referee: Dewayne Barbee
- Box score, Recap

Game information
First quarter
- OUA – Connor Flannigan 35-yard pass from Eli Livingston (Jax Daggers kick), 13:27. Tigers 7–0. Drive: 4 plays, 76 yards, 0:50.

Second quarter

- OUA – Garrison Jackson 14-yard pass from Eli Livingston (Jax Daggers kick), 15:00. Tigers 14–0. Drive: 4 plays, 79 yards, 1:39.
- NWO – Team safety, 10:03. Tigers 14–2.
- OUA – A. J. Jones 25-yard pass from Eli Livingston (Jax Daggers kick), 1:01. Tigers 21–2. Drive: 4 plays, 58 yards, 0:37.

Third quarter

- OUA – Carter McElhany 100-yard kickoff return (Jax Daggers kick), 14:47. Tigers 28–2.
- OUA – Kendel Givens 5-yard run (Jax Daggers kick), 5:43. Tigers 35–2. Drive: 9 plays, 67 yards, 4:57.
- OUA – Chris Henley Jr. 11-yard run (Jax Daggers kick), 1:52. Tigers 42–2. Drive: 2 plays, 52 yards, 0:30.

Fourth quarter

- OUA – Carter McElhany 58-yard pass from Nate TenBarge (Jax Daggers kick), 14:37. Tigers 49–2. Drive: 1 play, 58 yards, 0:11.
- OUA – Jayden Smith 11-yard run (Jax Daggers kick), 7:37. Tigers 56–2. Drive: 8 plays, 67 yards, 4:37.

| Statistics | OUA | NWO |
|---|---|---|
| First downs | 21 | 9 |
| Total yards | 535 | 134 |
| Rushing yards | 267 | 62 |
| Passing yards | 268 | 72 |
| Turnovers | 3 | 1 |
| Time of possession | 24:39 | 34:23 |

| Team | Category | Player | Statistics |
|---|---|---|---|
| Ouachita Baptist | Passing | Eli Livingston | 9/17, 171 yards, 3 TD, INT |
| Ouachita Baptist | Rushing | Kendel Givens | 18 rushes, 145 yards, TD |
| Ouachita Baptist | Receiving | Keemontrae McKnight | 2 receptions, 71 yards |
| NW Oklahoma State | Passing | Beck Moss | 12/26, 61 yards, INT |
| NW Oklahoma State | Rushing | Darian Gill | 14 rushes, 33 yards |
| NW Oklahoma State | Receiving | Mark Zamora | 4 receptions, 24 yards |

=== at Southern Arkansas ===
No. 17 Ouachita Baptist Tigers at Southern Arkansas Muleriders – Game summary

| Quarter | 1 | 2 | 3 | 4 | Total |
|---|---|---|---|---|---|
| No. 17 Tigers | 6 | 10 | 2 | 7 | 25 |
| Muleriders | 7 | 7 | 0 | 6 | 20 |

at Wilkins Stadium, Magnolia, Arkansas

- Date: September 21
- Game time: 6:00 p.m. CDT
- Game weather: Sunny, 97 °F (36 °C)
- Game attendance: 6,869
- Referee: Allen Tatum
- Box score, Recap

Game information
First quarter
- OUA – Kendel Givens 10-yard run (kick failed), 3:28. Tigers 6–0. Drive: 11 plays, 79 yards, 5:38.
- SAU – Darrel Henderson 30-yard fumble return (Daniel Gauna kick), 0:44. Muleriders 7–6.

Second quarter

- OUA – Jax Daggers 34-yard field goal, 11:32. Tigers 9–7. Drive: 10 plays, 66 yards, 4:04.
- OUA – Bo Baker 14-yard pass from Eli Livingston (Jax Daggers kick), 6:53. Tigers 16–7. Drive: 5 plays, 55 yards, 3:11.
- SAU – Cole Williams 11-yard pass from Judd Barton (Daniel Gauna kick), 1:16. Tigers 16–14. Drive: 16 plays, 75 yards, 5:37.

Third quarter

- OUA – Team safety, 11:10. Tigers 18–14.

Fourth quarter

- OUA – Eli Livingston 6-yard run (Jax Daggers kick), 9:34. Tigers 25–14. Drive: 11 plays, 82 yards, 5:44.
- SAU – Judd Barton 3-yard run (pass failed), 2:25. Tigers 25–20. Drive: 12 plays, 89 yards, 3:40.

| Statistics | OUA | SAU |
|---|---|---|
| First downs | 20 | 16 |
| Total yards | 356 | 297 |
| Rushing yards | 223 | 92 |
| Passing yards | 133 | 205 |
| Turnovers | 2 | 1 |
| Time of possession | 34:45 | 25:15 |

| Team | Category | Player | Statistics |
|---|---|---|---|
| Ouachita Baptist | Passing | Eli Livingston | 9/18, 133 yards, TD, INT |
| Ouachita Baptist | Rushing | Eli Livingston | 21 rushes, 120 yards, TD |
| Ouachita Baptist | Receiving | Bo Baker | 2 receptions, 48 yards, TD |
| Southern Arkansas | Passing | Judd Barton | 18/32, 205 yards, TD, INT |
| Southern Arkansas | Rushing | Judd Barton | 12 rushes, 38 yards, TD |
| Southern Arkansas | Receiving | Cole Williams | 4 receptions, 56 yards, TD |

=== Arkansas–Monticello ===
Arkansas–Monticello Boll Weevils at No. 16 Ouachita Baptist Tigers – Game summary

| Quarter | 1 | 2 | 3 | 4 | Total |
|---|---|---|---|---|---|
| Boll Weevils | 7 | 0 | 7 | 0 | 14 |
| No. 16 Tigers | 21 | 14 | 7 | 7 | 49 |

at Cliff Harris Stadium, Arkadelphia, Arkansas

- Date: September 28
- Game time: 6:00 p.m. CDT
- Game weather: Cloudy, 80 °F (27 °C)
- Game attendance: 3,452
- Referee: Michael Gervais
- Box score, Recap

Game information
First quarter
- OUA – Kendel Givens 1-yard run (Dax Jaggers kick), 8:28. Tigers 7–0. Drive: 13 plays, 61 yards, 6:25.
- OUA – Mikey Gonzalez 0-yard run (Dax Jaggers kick), 6:59. Tigers 14–0.
- UAM – Isaiah Cross 52-yard pass from Demilon Brown (Dylan Duhon kick), 5:15. Tigers 14–7. Drive: 4 plays, 75 yards, 1:44.
- OUA – Malique Reliford 0-yard blocked punt return (Dax Jaggers kick), 1:01. Tigers 21–7.

Second quarter

- OUA – Connor Flannigan 16-yard run (Dax Jaggers kick), 10:19. Tigers 28–7. Drive: 8 plays, 62 yards, 4:38.
- OUA – Eli Livingston 3-yard run (Jax Daggers kick), 1:18. Tigers 35–7. Drive: 8 plays, 63 yards, 3:18.

Third quarter

- OUA – Connor Flannigan 7-yard pass from Eli Livingston (Dax Jaggers kick), 3:52. Tigers 42–7. Drive: 14 plays, 88 yards, 8:20.
- UAM – D. J. Russell 16-yard pass from Demilon Brown (Dylan Duhon kick), 0:17. Tigers 42–14. Drive: 8 plays, 65 yards, 3:35.

Fourth quarter

- OUA – Nate TenBarge 19-yard run (Dax Jaggers kick), 5:26. Tigers 49–14. Drive: 3 plays, 44 yards, 1:24.

| Statistics | UAM | OUA |
|---|---|---|
| First downs | 14 | 24 |
| Total yards | 255 | 385 |
| Rushing yards | 29 | 211 |
| Passing yards | 226 | 174 |
| Turnovers | 1 | 0 |
| Time of possession | 25:52 | 34:08 |

| Team | Category | Player | Statistics |
|---|---|---|---|
| Arkansas–Monticello | Passing | Demilon Brown | 21/27, 213 yards, 2 TD |
| Arkansas–Monticello | Rushing | Tyler Reed | 9 rushes, 23 yards |
| Arkansas–Monticello | Receiving | Isaiah Cross | 3 receptions, 97 yards, TD |
| Ouachita Baptist | Passing | Eli Livingston | 13/17, 156 yards, TD |
| Ouachita Baptist | Rushing | Kendel Givens | 19 rushes, 72 yards, TD |
| Ouachita Baptist | Receiving | Keemontrae McKnight | 3 receptions, 47 yards |

=== at SE Oklahoma State ===
No. 14 Ouachita Baptist Tigers at Southeastern Oklahoma State Savage Storm – Game summary

| Quarter | 1 | 2 | 3 | 4 | Total |
|---|---|---|---|---|---|
| No. 14 Tigers | 0 | 15 | 7 | 3 | 25 |
| Savage Storm | 0 | 6 | 3 | 0 | 9 |

at Paul Laird Field, Durant, Oklahoma

- Date: October 5
- Game time: 2:00 p.m. CDT
- Game weather: Sunny, 88 °F (31 °C)
- Game attendance: 2,543
- Referee: Brad Frisby
- Box score, Recap

Game information
First quarter
- No scoring plays

Second quarter

- SEO – Kobe Jennings 22-yard pass from Luke Hohenberger (kick failed), 6:48. Savage Storm 6–0. Drive: 10 plays, 80 yards, 6:39.
- OUA – Eli Livingston 79-yard run (Eli Livingston pass to Nathan Frater), 2:48. Tigers 8–6. Drive: 2 plays, 82 yards, 0:57.
- OUA – Carter McElhany 55-yard pass from Eli Livingston (Dax Jaggers kick), 1:11. Tigers 15–6. Drive: 3 plays, 65 yards, 0:33.

Third quarter

- OUA – Nate TenBarge 10-yard run (Dax Jaggers kick), 8:28. Tigers 22–6. Drive: 2 plays, 11 yards, 0:42.
- SEO – Dylan Cox 28-yard field goal, 0:26. Tigers 22–9. Drive: 14 plays, 64 yards, 8:02.

Fourth quarter

- OUA – Dax Jaggers 32-yard field goal, 2:18. Tigers 25–9. Drive: 4 plays, -2 yards, 1:18.

| Statistics | OUA | SEO |
|---|---|---|
| First downs | 8 | 18 |
| Total yards | 240 | 393 |
| Rushing yards | 119 | 143 |
| Passing yards | 121 | 250 |
| Turnovers | 0 | 1 |
| Time of possession | 20:11 | 39:49 |

| Team | Category | Player | Statistics |
|---|---|---|---|
| Ouachita Baptist | Passing | Eli Livingston | 7/13, 121 yards, TD |
| Ouachita Baptist | Rushing | Eli Livingston | 8 rushes, 79 yards, TD |
| Ouachita Baptist | Receiving | Carter McElhany | 2 receptions, 62 yards, TD |
| SE Oklahoma State | Passing | Luke Hohenberger | 11/26, 162 yards, TD, INT |
| SE Oklahoma State | Rushing | D. J. Brown | 20 rushes, 69 yards |
| SE Oklahoma State | Receiving | Victor Taylor | 3 receptions, 56 yards |

=== East Central ===
East Central Tigers at No. 10 Ouachita Baptist Tigers – Game summary

| Quarter | 1 | 2 | 3 | 4 | Total |
|---|---|---|---|---|---|
| ECU Tigers | 0 | 0 | 0 | 0 | 0 |
| No. 10 OUA Tigers | 14 | 6 | 14 | 6 | 40 |

at Cliff Harris Stadium, Arkadelphia, Arkansas

- Date: October 12
- Game time: 12:00 p.m. CDT
- Game weather: Sunny, 81 °F (27 °C)
- Game attendance: 5,875
- Referee: Chuck Scott
- Box score, Recap

Game information
First quarter
- OUA – Nate TenBarge 7-yard run (Dax Jaggers kick), 12:08. Ouachita Baptist 7–0. Drive: 9 plays, 75 yards, 2:52.
- OUA – Hank Hatfield 43-yard pass from Kendel Givens (Dax Jaggers kick), 9:02. Ouachita Baptist 14–0. Drive: 4 plays, 70 yards, 2:01.

Second quarter

- OUA – Dax Jaggers 49-yard field goal, 14:51. Ouachita Baptist 17–0. Drive: 8 plays, 1 yard, 3:56.
- OUA – Dax Jaggers 60-yard field goal, 0:05. Ouachita Baptist 20–0. Drive: 11 plays, 42 yards, 4:06.

Third quarter

- OUA – Kendel Givens 4-yard run (Dax Jaggers kick), 7:11. Ouachita Baptist 27–0. Drive: 5 plays, 31 yards, 2:04.
- OUA – Kendel Givens 1-yard run (Dax Jaggers kick), 0:42. Ouachita Baptist 34–0. Drive: 9 plays, 72 yards, 3:38.

Fourth quarter

- OUA – Chris Hightower 25-yard pass from Riley Harms (kick failed), 5:09. Ouachita Baptist 40–0. Drive: 11 plays, 95 yards, 4:38.

| Statistics | ECU | OUA |
|---|---|---|
| First downs | 7 | 28 |
| Total yards | 88 | 505 |
| Rushing yards | 29 | 280 |
| Passing yards | 59 | 225 |
| Turnovers | 1 | 2 |
| Time of possession | 25:13 | 34:47 |

| Team | Category | Player | Statistics |
|---|---|---|---|
| East Central | Passing | Sergio Kennedy | 10/20, 59 yards, INT |
| East Central | Rushing | Cade Searcy | 8 rushes, 20 yards |
| East Central | Receiving | Deqavius Bowens | 4 receptions, 22 yards |
| Ouachita Baptist | Passing | Nate TenBarge | 14/22, 151 yards, INT |
| Ouachita Baptist | Rushing | Nate TenBarge | 16 rushes, 110 yards, TD |
| Ouachita Baptist | Receiving | Connor Flannigan | 8 receptions, 80 yards |

=== No. 1 Harding ===
No. 1 Harding Bisons at No. 9 Ouachita Baptist Tigers – Game summary

| Quarter | 1 | 2 | 3 | 4 | Total |
|---|---|---|---|---|---|
| No. 1 Bisons | 7 | 6 | 0 | 0 | 13 |
| No. 9 Tigers | 7 | 3 | 0 | 7 | 17 |

at Cliff Harris Stadium, Arkadelphia, Arkansas

- Date: October 19
- Game time: 7:00 p.m. CDT
- Game weather: Clear, 64 °F (18 °C)
- Game attendance: 7,322
- Referee: Brad Frisby
- Box score, Recap

Game information
First quarter
- HAR – Dane Romberger 13-yard pass from Braden Jay (Magnus Lepak kick), 9:30. Bisons 7–0. Drive: 7 plays, 69 yards, 4:16.
- OUA – Kendel Givens 3-yard run (Dax Jaggers kick), 3:42. Tied 7–7. Drive: 10 plays, 69 yards, 5:48.

Second quarter

- HAR – Magnus Lepak 52-yard field goal, 9:55. Bisons 10–7. Drive: 10 plays, 44 yards, 5:35.
- OUA – Dax Jaggers 25-yard field goal, 5:44. Tied 10–10. Drive: 9 plays, 61 yards, 4:11.
- HAR – Magnus Lepak 42-yard field goal, 0:24. Bisons 13–10. Drive: 11 plays, 72 yards, 4:08.

Third quarter

- No scoring plays

Fourth quarter

- OUA – Eli Livingston 4-yard pass from Connor Flannigan (Dax Jaggers kick), 12:58. Tigers 17–13. Drive: 6 plays, 48 yards, 2:42.

| Statistics | HAR | OUA |
|---|---|---|
| First downs | 15 | 12 |
| Total yards | 288 | 198 |
| Rushing yards | 218 | 85 |
| Passing yards | 70 | 113 |
| Turnovers | 2 | 1 |
| Time of possession | 33:02 | 26:58 |

| Team | Category | Player | Statistics |
|---|---|---|---|
| Harding | Passing | Cole Keylon | 5/12, 57 yards |
| Harding | Rushing | Cole Keylon | 14 rushes, 78 yards |
| Harding | Receiving | Darius Brown | 3 receptions, 38 yards |
| Ouachita Baptist | Passing | Eli Livingston | 10/18, 109 yards, INT |
| Ouachita Baptist | Rushing | Kendel Givens | 13 rushes, 47 yards, TD |
| Ouachita Baptist | Receiving | Connor Flannigan | 5 receptions, 62 yards |

=== at Arkansas Tech ===
No. 5 Ouachita Baptist Tigers at Arkansas Tech Wonder Boys – Game summary

| Quarter | 1 | 2 | 3 | 4 | Total |
|---|---|---|---|---|---|
| No. 5 Tigers | 21 | 0 | 7 | 10 | 38 |
| Wonder Boys | 0 | 0 | 0 | 7 | 7 |

at Thone Stadium, Russellville, Arkansas

- Date: October 26
- Game time: 2:00 p.m. CDT
- Game weather: Sunny, 73 °F (23 °C)
- Game attendance: 2,871
- Referee: Allen Tatum
- Box score, Recap

Game information
First quarter
- OUA – Kendel Givens 1-yard run (Dax Jaggers kick), 9:27. Tigers 7–0. Drive: 6 plays, 10 yards, 2:38.
- OUA – Kendel Givens 23-yard run (Dax Jaggers kick), 6:00. Tigers 14–0. Drive: 6 plays, 61 yards, 2:25.
- OUA – Nate TenBarge 25-yard run (Dax Jaggers kick), 0:48. Tigers 21–0. Drive: 7 plays, 54 yards, 2:21.

Second quarter

- No scoring plays

Third quarter

- OUA – Nate TenBarge 2-yard run (Dax Jaggers kick), 2:49. Tigers 28–0. Drive: 7 plays, 76 yards, 2:59.

Fourth quarter

- ATU – Jared Long 9-yard pass from Ethan Forrester (Christopher Baldazo kick), 11:32. Tigers 28–7. Drive: 11 plays, 75 yards, 6:17.
- OUA – Kendel Givens 4-yard run (Lucas Wilbur kick), 10:20. Tigers 35–7. Drive: 4 plays, 44 yards, 1:06.
- OUA – Lucas Wilbur 30-yard field goal, 6:15. Tigers 38–7. Drive: 5 plays, 16 yards, 1:58.

| Statistics | OUA | ATU |
|---|---|---|
| First downs | 15 | 16 |
| Total yards | 323 | 277 |
| Rushing yards | 195 | 100 |
| Passing yards | 128 | 177 |
| Turnovers | 0 | 1 |
| Time of possession | 22:41 | 37:19 |

| Team | Category | Player | Statistics |
|---|---|---|---|
| Ouachita Baptist | Passing | Nate TenBarge | 12/21, 128 yards |
| Ouachita Baptist | Rushing | Kendel Givens | 14 rushes, 87 yards, 3 TD |
| Ouachita Baptist | Receiving | Connor Flannigan | 8 receptions, 90 yards |
| Arkansas Tech | Passing | Ethan Forrester | 16/31, 177 yards, TD, INT |
| Arkansas Tech | Rushing | Ethan Forrester | 15 rushes, 46 yards |
| Arkansas Tech | Receiving | Jared Long | 2 receptions, 45 yards, TD |

=== Southern Nazarene ===
Southern Nazarene Crimson Storm at No. 3 Ouachita Baptist Tigers – Game summary

| Quarter | 1 | 2 | 3 | 4 | Total |
|---|---|---|---|---|---|
| Crimson Storm | 3 | 3 | 3 | 9 | 18 |
| No. 3 Tigers | 7 | 3 | 7 | 0 | 17 |

at Cliff Harris Stadium, Arkadelphia, Arkansas

- Date: October 19
- Game time: 6:00 p.m. CDT
- Game weather: Cloudy, 72 °F (22 °C)
- Game attendance: 1,581
- Referee: Jimmy Malone
- Box score, Recap

Game information
First quarter
- SNU – Kameron Van Prooyen 30-yard field goal, 10:07. Crimson Storm 3–0. Drive: 7 plays, 11 yards, 2:57.
- OUA – Kendel Givens 1-yard run (Dax Jaggers kick), 3:23. Tigers 7–3. Drive: 12 plays, 71 yards, 6:36.

Second quarter

- OUA – Dax Jaggers 25-yard field goal, 9:29. Tigers 10–3. Drive: 10 plays, 52 yards, 5:22.
- SNU – Kameron Van Prooyen 40-yard field goal, 0:11. Tigers 10–6. Drive: 10 plays, 36 yards, 3:53.

Third quarter

- OUA – Carter McElhany 11-yard run (Dax Jaggers kick), 11:33. Tigers 17–6. Drive: 6 plays, 23 yards, 3:14.
- SNU – Kameron Van Prooyen 41-yard field goal, 2:30. Tigers 17–9. Drive: 6 plays, 18 yards, 3:36.

Fourth quarter

- SNU – Kameron Van Prooyen 43-yard field goal, 11:50. Tigers 17–12. Drive: 8 plays, 36 yards, 3:22.
- SNU – Dalen Smith 11-yard pass from Bryson Evans (pass failed), 0:24. Crimson Storm 18–17. Drive: 9 plays, 72 yards, 2:08.

| Statistics | SNU | OUA |
|---|---|---|
| First downs | 14 | 14 |
| Total yards | 268 | 260 |
| Rushing yards | 92 | 196 |
| Passing yards | 176 | 64 |
| Turnovers | 1 | 3 |
| Time of possession | 31:35 | 28:25 |

| Team | Category | Player | Statistics |
|---|---|---|---|
| Southern Nazarene | Passing | Bryson Evans | 15/28, 176 yards, TD, INT |
| Southern Nazarene | Rushing | Bryson Evans | 15 rushes, 70 yards |
| Southern Nazarene | Receiving | Dalen Smith | 4 receptions, 52 yards, TD |
| Ouachita Baptist | Passing | Eli Livingston | 5/8, 43 yards |
| Ouachita Baptist | Rushing | Kendel Givens | 20 rushes, 123 yards, TD |
| Ouachita Baptist | Receiving | Connor Flannigan | 3 receptions, 27 yards |

Bill Connelly of ESPN ranked this game at no. 51 on his list of the "100 best college football games of the 2024 season", calling the Crimson Storm's victory the biggest upset of the 2024 season and one of the biggest in the history of college football.

=== at Oklahoma Baptist ===
No. 9 Ouachita Baptist Tigers at Oklahoma Baptist Bison – Game summary

| Quarter | 1 | 2 | 3 | 4 | Total |
|---|---|---|---|---|---|
| No. 9 Tigers | 7 | 27 | 14 | 7 | 55 |
| Bison | 0 | 0 | 0 | 0 | 0 |

at Crain Family Stadium, Shawnee, Oklahoma

- Date: November 9
- Game time: 2:00 p.m. CST
- Game weather: Sunny, 65 °F (18 °C)
- Game attendance: 2,226
- Referee: Michael Gervais
- Box score, Recap

Game information
First quarter
- OUA – Kendel Givens 25-yard run (Dax Jaggers kick), 10:17. Tigers 7–0. Drive: 11 plays, 75 yards, 4:43.

Second quarter

- OUA – Kendel Givens 33-yard pass from Nate TenBarge (Dax Jaggers kick), 10:49. Tigers 14–0. Drive: 8 plays, 70 yards, 3:33.
- OUA – Dax Jaggers 31-yard field goal, 7:19. Tigers 17–0. Drive: 7 plays, 45 yards, 2:38.
- OUA – Chris Henley Jr. 16-yard run (Dax Jaggers kick), 4:47. Tigers 24–0. Drive: 1 play, 16 yards, 0:06.
- OUA – Carter McElhany 27-yard pass from Nate TenBarge (Dax Jaggers kick), 1:50. Tigers 31–0. Drive: 5 plays, 43 yards, 1:16.
- OUA – Dax Jaggers 46-yard field goal, 0:00. Tigers 34–0. Drive: 4 plays, 26 yards, 0:25.

Third quarter

- OUA – Mario Ganter Jr. 40-yard fumble return (Dax Jaggers kick), 13:32. Tigers 41–0.
- OUA – Carter McElhany 53-yard pass from Riley Harms (Lucas Wilbur kick), 1:14. Tigers 48–0. Drive: 1 play, 53 yards, 0:09.

Fourth quarter

- OUA – Lyric Tredwell 30-yard run (Lucas Wilbur kick), 12:43. Tigers 55–0. Drive: 5 plays, 44 yards, 2:32.

| Statistics | OUA | OKB |
|---|---|---|
| First downs | 21 | 11 |
| Total yards | 401 | 191 |
| Rushing yards | 238 | 53 |
| Passing yards | 163 | 138 |
| Turnovers | 0 | 5 |
| Time of possession | 26:56 | 31:23 |

| Team | Category | Player | Statistics |
|---|---|---|---|
| Ouachita Baptist | Passing | Nate TenBarge | 9/17, 103 yards, 2 TD |
| Ouachita Baptist | Rushing | Kendel Givens | 20 rushes, 106 yards, TD |
| Ouachita Baptist | Receiving | Carter McElhany | 3 receptions, 92 yards, 2 TD |
| Oklahoma Baptist | Passing | Camden McCrary | 17/29, 104 yards, 2 INT |
| Oklahoma Baptist | Rushing | E. J. Moore | 13 rushes, 45 yards |
| Oklahoma Baptist | Receiving | Damorrion Brown | 3 receptions, 28 yards |

=== at Henderson State ===
No. 9 Ouachita Baptist Tigers at Henderson State Reddies – Game summary

| Quarter | 1 | 2 | 3 | 4 | Total |
|---|---|---|---|---|---|
| No. 9 Tigers | 3 | 7 | 0 | 17 | 27 |
| Reddies | 3 | 3 | 0 | 14 | 20 |

at Carpenter–Haygood Stadium, Arkadelphia, Arkansas

- Date: November 16
- Game time: 11:00 a.m. CST
- Game weather: Sunny
- Game attendance: 9,736
- Referee: Brad Frisby
- Box score, Recap

Game information
First quarter
- OUA – Dax Jaggers 28-yard field goal, 5:55. Tigers 3–0. Drive: 13 plays, 70 yards, 5:54.
- HSU – Kolby King 35-yard field goal, 0:36. Tied 3–3. Drive: 4 plays, 6 yards, 0:49.

Second quarter

- OUA – Bo Baker 60-yard pass from Eli Livingston (Dax Jaggers kick), 11:44. Tigers 10–3. Drive: 2 plays, 74 yards, 0:38.
- HSU – Kolby King 29-yard field goal, 5:30. Tigers 10–6. Drive: 13 plays, 53 yards, 6:14.

Third quarter

- No scoring plays

Fourth quarter

- OUA – Dax Jaggers 25-yard field goal, 13:11. Tigers 13–6. Drive: 9 plays, 28 yards, 3:38.
- HSU – Andrew Edwards 17-yard run (Kolby King kick), 11:19. Tied 13–13. Drive: 4 plays, 75 yards, 1:52.
- OUA – Kendel Givens 42-yard run (Dax Jaggers kick), 9:27. Tigers 20–13. Drive: 5 plays, 70 yards, 1:47.
- HSU – Cayden Davis 35-yard pass from Andrew Edwards (Kolby King kick), 5:43. Tied 20–20. Drive: 8 plays, 78 yards, 3:39.
- OUA – Kendel Givens 1-yard run (Dax Jaggers kick), 1:54. Tigers 27–20. Drive: 8 plays, 73 yards, 3:44.

| Statistics | OUA | HSU |
|---|---|---|
| First downs | 19 | 17 |
| Total yards | 394 | 341 |
| Rushing yards | 233 | 82 |
| Passing yards | 161 | 259 |
| Turnovers | 2 | 1 |
| Time of possession | 30:39 | 29:21 |

| Team | Category | Player | Statistics |
|---|---|---|---|
| Ouachita Baptist | Passing | Eli Livingston | 8/17, 161 yards, TD, INT |
| Ouachita Baptist | Rushing | Kendel Givens | 24 rushes, 108 yards, 2 TD |
| Ouachita Baptist | Receiving | Bo Baker | 3 receptions, 70 yards, TD |
| Henderson State | Passing | Andrew Edwards | 23/40, 259 yards, TD, INT |
| Henderson State | Rushing | Jalen Abraham | 5 rushes, 38 yards |
| Henderson State | Receiving | Timieone Jackson | 7 receptions, 79 yards |

=== at No. 8 Central Oklahoma (NCAA Division II First Round) ===
NCAA Division II First Round
No. 9 Ouachita Baptist Tigers at No. 8 Central Oklahoma Bronchos – Game summary

| Quarter | 1 | 2 | 3 | 4 | OT | Total |
|---|---|---|---|---|---|---|
| No. 9 Tigers | 7 | 0 | 7 | 17 | 0 | 31 |
| No. 8 Bronchos | 7 | 7 | 10 | 7 | 7 | 38 |

at Chad Richison Stadium, Edmond, Oklahoma

- Date: November 23
- Game time: 1:00 p.m. CDT
- Game weather: Sunny, 65 °F (18 °C)
- Game attendance: 3,995
- Referee: Craig Demaree
- Box score, Recap

Game information
First quarter
- UCO – Jaylen Cottrell 73-yard run (Nicky Quevedo kick), 7:07. Bronchos 7–0. Drive: 3 plays, 82 yards, 0:34.
- OUA – Garrison Jackson 1-yard pass from Kendel Givens (Dax Jaggers kick), 0:24. Tied 7–7. Drive: 7 plays, 56 yards, 3:47.

Second quarter

- UCO – Jaylen Cottrell 20-yard run (Nicky Quevedo kick), 7:32. Bronchos 14–7. Drive: 11 plays, 72 yards, 3:56.

Third quarter

- UCO – Nicky Quevedo 29-yard field goal, 11:06. Bronchos 17–7. Drive: 10 plays, 51 yards, 3:54.
- OUA – Chris Henley Jr. 15-yard run (Jax Daggers kick), 7:02. Bronchos 17–14. Drive: 7 plays, 75 yards, 4:04.
- UCO – Ashton Schumann 25-yard pass from Jett Huff (Nicky Quevedo kick), 3:31. Bronchos 24–14. Drive: 8 plays, 65 yards, 3:25.

Fourth quarter

- OUA – Kendel Givens 36-yard run (Jax Daggers kick), 12:42. Bronchos 24–21. Drive: 4 plays, 66 yards, 2:07.
- OUA – Carter McElhany 47-yard pass from Eli Livingston (Jax Daggers kick), 3:18. Tigers 28–24. Drive: 4 plays, 40 yards, 1:02.
- UCO – Jacob Delso 12-yard pass from Jett Huff (Nicky Quevedo kick), 1:12. Bronchos 31–28. Drive: 10 plays, 84 yards, 2:06.
- OUA – Dax Jaggers 40-yard field goal, 0:05. Tied 31–31. Drive: 8 plays, 52 yards, 1:07.

Overtime

- UCO – Jacob Delso 3-yard pass from Jett Huff (Jax Daggers kick). Bronchos 38–31. Drive: 4 plays, 25 yards.

| Statistics | OUA | UCO |
|---|---|---|
| First downs | 20 | 26 |
| Total yards | 397 | 537 |
| Rushing yards | 153 | 166 |
| Passing yards | 244 | 371 |
| Turnovers | 1 | 1 |
| Time of possession | 29:54 | 30:06 |

| Team | Category | Player | Statistics |
|---|---|---|---|
| Ouachita Baptist | Passing | Eli Livingston | 13/22, 198 yards, TD, INT |
| Ouachita Baptist | Rushing | Kendel Givens | 11 rushes, 66 yards, TD |
| Ouachita Baptist | Receiving | Carter McElhany | 6 receptions, 138 yards, TD |
| Central Oklahoma | Passing | Jett Huff | 36/58, 371 yards, 3 TD, INT |
| Central Oklahoma | Rushing | Jaylen Cottrell | 17 rushes, 151 yards, 2 TD |
| Central Oklahoma | Receiving | Terrill Davis | 14 receptions, 155 yards |
