= Ralph Carpenter (American football) =

American football and baseball coach (1930–1990)

Biographical details
- Born: August 6, 1930
- Died: February 16, 1990 (aged 59); Memphis, Tennessee, U.S.

Playing career

Football
- 1954–1956: Henderson State

Coaching career (HC unless noted)

Football
- 1967–1970: Henderson State (assistant)
- 1971–1989: Henderson State

Baseball
- 1970–1975: Henderson State

Head coaching record
- Overall: 119–76–5 (football); 106–68 (baseball)
- Bowls: 1–0
- Tournaments: Football; 1–2 (NAIA D-I playoffs)

Accomplishments and honors

Championships
- Football; 5 AIC (1973–1975, 1977, 1985) Baseball; 2 AIC (1973–1974)

Awards
- Football; NAIA Division I Coach of the Year (1985)

Ralph L. "Sporty" Carpenter (August 6, 1930 – February 16, 1990) was an American football and baseball coach. He served as the head football coach at Henderson State University in Arkadelphia, Arkansas from 1971 to 1989, compiling a record of 119–76–5. Carpenter was also the head baseball coach at Henderson State from 1970 to 1975, tallying a mark of 106–68.

A native of Hamburg, Arkansas, Carpenter played college football at Henderson State from 1954 to 1956 under head coach Duke Wells. He returned to Henderson State in 1967 as assistant football coach. Carpenter died on February 16, 1990, at a hospital in Memphis, Tennessee from complications of a liver transplant.

== Head coaching record ==
=== Football ===
Year	Team	Overall	Conference	Standing	Bowl/playoffs
Henderson State Reddies (Arkansas Intercollegiate Conference) (1971–1985)
1971	Henderson State	4–4–1	1–4–1	6th	
1972	Henderson State	4–6	2–4	5th	
1973	Henderson State	10–1	6–0	1st	
1974	Henderson State	11–2	6–0	1st	L NAIA Division I Semifinal
1975	Henderson State	11–1	5–1	T–1st	W Bicentennial
1976	Henderson State	8–2	4–2	T–3rd	
1977	Henderson State	9–2	5–1	1st	
1978	Henderson State	7–2–1	4–1–1	2nd	
1979	Henderson State	5–5	4–2	2nd	
1980	Henderson State	5–6	2–4	T–4th	
1981	Henderson State	7–3	3–3	T–3rd	
1982	Henderson State	4–5–1	3–2–1	3rd	
1983	Henderson State	3–7	1–5	6th	
1984	Henderson State	4–6	2–4	6th	
1985	Henderson State	9–3	6–1	T–1st	L NAIA Division I Semifinal
1986	Henderson State	2–7–1	2–4–1	6th	
1987	Henderson State	5–5	3–3	T–3rd	
1988	Henderson State	4–5–1	2–3–1	T–4th	
1989	Henderson State	7–4	4–2	3rd	
Henderson State:		119–76–5	65–46–5		
Total:		119–76–5			
National championship Conference title Conference division title or championship game berth
