= Solon B. Sudduth =

American sports coach

Biographical details
- Born: April 2, 1908
- Died: July 18, 1963 (aged 55); Nashville, Tennessee, U.S.

Coaching career (HC unless noted)

Football
- 1935–1938: Henderson State

Basketball
- 1935–1939: Henderson State

Head coaching record
- Overall: 8–22–2 (football); 32–22 (basketball)

Solon Bluch Sudduth (April 2, 1908 – July 18, 1963) was an American football and basketball coach. He served as the head football coach at Henderson State Teachers College—now known as Henderson State University—from 1935 to 1938, compiling a record of 8–22–2. Sudduth was the head basketball coach at Henderson State from 1935 to 1939, tallying a mark of 32–22. He was also a health educator.

== Head coaching record ==
=== Football ===
| Year | Team | Overall | Conference | Standing | Bowl/playoffs |
|---|---|---|---|---|---|
Henderson State Reddies (Arkansas Intercollegiate Conference) (1935–1938)
| 1935 | Henderson State | 2–6–1 | 2–4 | | |
| 1936 | Henderson State | 3–5 | 2–3 | | |
| 1937 | Henderson State | 2–5 | 1–3 | | |
| 1938 | Henderson State | 1–6–1 | 1–4 | | |
| Henderson State: | | 8–22–2 | 6–14 | | |
| Total: | | 8–22–2 | | | |
