= Sudduth =

Sudduth is a surname. Notable people with the surname include:

- Andrew Sudduth (1961–2006), American rower
- Jill Sudduth (born 1971), American synchronised swimmer
- Jimmy Lee Sudduth (1910–2007), American outsider artist and blues musician
- Mikky Ekko (born 1984), stage name of American musician John Stephen Sudduth
- Kohl Sudduth (born 1974), American actor
- Margaret Ashmore Sudduth (1859–1957), American educator, editor, and temperance advocate
- Skipp Sudduth (born 1956), American actor
- Solon B. Sudduth (1908–1963), American football and basketball coach
- Willa Mae Sudduth, co-founder of the Coalition of Labor Union Women

== See also ==
- Sudduth Coliseum, a multi-purpose arena in Lake Charles, Louisiana, US
