= 2012 Missouri Western Griffons football team =

American college football season

2012 Missouri Western Griffons football

MIAA champions

NCAA Division II quarterfinals, L 10–17 vs. Minnesota State
- Conference: Mid-America Intercollegiate Athletics Association
- Record: 12–2 (9–1 MIAA)
- Head coach: Jerry Partridge (16th season)
- Offensive coordinator: Todd Throckmorton (4th season)
- Defensive coordinator: Regi Trotter (9th season)
- Home stadium: Spratt Stadium

2012 Mid-America Intercollegiate Athletics Association football standings
	Conf.			Overall
Team	W		L	W		L
No. 5 Missouri Western $^	9	–	1	12	–	2
No. 22 Emporia State #	9	–	2	10	–	2
No. 10 NW Missouri State ^	8	–	2	10	–	3
Pittsburg State	7	–	3	7	–	3
Lindenwood #*	7	–	3	8	–	4
Washburn	7	–	4	7	–	4
Central Missouri	6	–	4	6	–	4
Missouri Southern	5	–	5	6	–	5
Fort Hays State	4	–	6	5	–	6
Northeastern State	4	–	6	4	–	6
Truman	3	–	7	4	–	7
Southwest Baptist	3	–	8	3	–	8
Nebraska–Kearney	2	–	8	3	–	8
Central Oklahoma	2	–	8	2	–	8
Lincoln (MO)	1	–	10	1	–	10
$ – Conference champion; ^ – NCAA Division II playoff participant; # – bowl game participant (Emporia State: Kanza Bowl, Lindenwood: Mineral Water Bowl) * – provisional NCAA Division II member; Rankings from AFCA poll

The 2012 Missouri Western Griffons football team represented Missouri Western University during the 2012 NCAA Division II football season. The Griffons played their home games on Craig Field in Spratt Stadium in St. Joseph, Missouri, as they have done since 1970. 2012 was the 43rd season in school history. The Griffons were led by the sixteenth-year head coach, Jerry Partridge. Missouri Western has been a member of the Mid-America Intercollegiate Athletics Association since 1989.

== Schedule ==
Date	Time	Opponent	Rank	Site	TV	Result	Attendance
August 30	6:00 p.m.	Central Missouri	No. 18	Spratt Stadium; St. Joseph, MO		W 38–26	5,471
September 8	6:00 p.m.	William Jewell*	No. 14	Spratt Stadium; St. Joseph, MO		W 56–0	4,811
September 15	6:07 p.m.	Nebraska–Kearney	No. 8	Spratt Stadium; St. Joseph, MO	MIAA TV	W 38–14	5,916
September 22	7:00 p.m.	at Fort Hays State	No. 7	Lewis Field Stadium; Hays, KS		W 21–3	4,407
September 29	6:00 p.m.	Central Oklahoma	No. 7	Spratt Stadium; St. Joseph, MO		W 45–23	4,211
October 6	2:00 p.m.	at Northeastern State	No. 5	Doc Wadley Stadium; Tahlequah, OK		W 45–31	2,168
October 13	1:30 p.m.	Missouri Southern^{†}	No. 4	Spratt Stadium; St. Joseph, MO		L 30–31	3,794
October 20	2:00 p.m.	at No. 7 Pittsburg State	No. 16	Carnie Smith Stadium; Pittsburgh, KS		W 63–14	11,910
October 25	6:00 p.m.	No. 15 Emporia State	No. 12	Francis G. Welch Stadium; Emporia, KS	MIAA TV	W 57–28	6,245
November 3	1:30 p.m.	No. 25 Washburn	No. 11	Spratt Stadium; St. Joseph, MO		W 56–28	4,826
November 10	2:37 p.m.	No. 4 NW Missouri State	No. 11	Bearcat Stadium; Maryville, MO (rivalry)	MIAA TV	W 21–20	10,102
November 17	12:00 p.m.	No. 7 Minnesota–Duluth*	No. 9	Spratt Stadium; St. Joseph, MO (NCAA Division II first round)		W 57–55 ^{3OT}	4,419
November 24	12:00 p.m.	No. 6 Henderson State*	No. 9	Carpenter–Haygood Stadium; Arkadelphia, AR (NCAA Division II second round)		W 45–21	5,069
December 1	12:00 p.m.	No. 5 Minnesota State*	No. 9	Blakeslee Stadium; Mankato, MN (NCAA Division II quarterfinals)		L 10–17	3,014
*Non-conference game; ^{†}Homecoming; Rankings from AFCA DII Coaches' Poll released prior to game; All times are in Central time
