= Clyde Berry =

American sportsperson (1931–2023)

Biographical details
- Born: September 27, 1931
- Died: December 14, 2023 (aged 92)

Playing career

Football
- 1950–1952: Henderson State

Baseball
- 1950–1952: Henderson State
- 1953: Topeka Owls
- 1953: Madisonville Miners

Coaching career (HC unless noted)

Football
- 1967–1970: Henderson State

Baseball
- 1963–1966: Henderson State
- 1982–1987: Henderson State

Head coaching record
- Overall: 26–14 (football); 205–129–2 (baseball)

Accomplishments and honors

Championships
- Football; 1 AIC (1969) Baseball; 2 AIC (1965, 1982)

Conrid Clyde Berry (September 27, 1931 – December 14, 2023) was an American football and baseball player and coach. He was the head football coach at Henderson State College—now known as Henderson State University—in Arkadelphia, Arkansas from 1967 to 1970, compiling a record of 26–14. Berry also served two stints as head baseball coach at Henderson State, from 1963 to 1966 and from 1982 to 1987, tallying a mark of 205–129–2.

Berry was the nephew of Major League Baseball pitcher Joe Berry.

Clyde Berry died on December 14, 2023, at the age of 92.

== Head coaching record ==
=== Football ===
Year	Team	Overall	Conference	Standing	Bowl/playoffs
Henderson State Reddies (Arkansas Intercollegiate Conference) (1967–1970)
1967	Henderson State	5–4	3–3	T–5th	
1968	Henderson State	8–3	4–2	T–2nd	
1969	Henderson State	8–2	5–1	1st	
1970	Henderson State	5–5	2–4	5th	
Henderson State:		26–14	14–10		
Total:		26–14			
National championship Conference title Conference division title or championship game berth
