= Duke Wells =

American football, basketball, and baseball player and coach

Biographical details
- Born: February 5, 1914
- Died: November 28, 1989 (aged 75)

Playing career

Football
- 1932–1934: Henderson State

Basketball
- c. 1932–1934: Henderson State

Baseball
- c. 1932–1934: Henderson State
- 1937–1938: Jackson Generals
- 1938: Hot Springs Bathers
- 1939: Fulton Tigers
- Positions: Second baseman, third baseman (baseball)

Coaching career (HC unless noted)

Football
- 1941–1961: Henderson State

Basketball
- 1941–1949: Henderson State

Baseball
- 1952–1955: Henderson State
- 1957–1961: Henderson State

Administrative career (AD unless noted)
- 1962–1979: Henderson State

Head coaching record
- Overall: 73–78–11 (football); 63–62 (basketball); 86–60 (baseball)

Accomplishments and honors

Championships
- Football; 2 AIC (1950, 1959) Baseball; 2 AIC (1953, 1958)

John D. "Duke" Wells (February 5, 1914 – November 28, 1989) was an American football, basketball, and baseball player and coach. He served as the head football coach at Henderson State Teachers College—now known as Henderson State University—in Arkadelphia, Arkansas in 1941 and from 1945 to 1961, compiling a record of 73–78–11. He was also Henderson State's head basketball coach from 1941 to 1949, tallying a mark of 63–62. The school's basketball arena is named after him.

== Head coaching record ==
=== Football ===
Year	Team	Overall	Conference	Standing	Bowl/playoffs
Henderson State Reddies (Arkansas Intercollegiate Conference) (1941–1961)
1941	Henderson State	1–7–2	1–5		
1942	No team—World War II				
1943	No team—World War II				
1944	No team—World War II				
1945	Henderson State	3–5	3–2		
1946	Henderson State	6–3–1	4–2	3rd	
1947	Henderson State	1–7–1	0–6–1		
1948	Henderson State	3–7	3–4		
1949	Henderson State	7–2	6–2		
1950	Henderson State	6–1–2	6–0–2	1st	
1951	Henderson State	5–3–1	5–1–1		
1952	Henderson State	4–4	3–2	2nd	
1953	Henderson State	3–5	3–3		
1954	Henderson State	4–4	3–2		
1955	Henderson State	5–3–1	4–1–1		
1956	Henderson State	4–4–1	3–2–1		
1957	Henderson State	2–5–1	1–4–1		
1958	Henderson State	3–6	2–4	5th	
1959	Henderson State	6–2–1	5–0–1	T–1st	
1960	Henderson State	6–4	5–2	3rd	
1961	Henderson State	4–6	3–3	5th	
Henderson State:		73–78–11	60–45–8		
Total:		73–78–11			
National championship Conference title Conference division title or championship game berth
