= Todd Knight =

American football coach (born 1966 or 1967)

Current position
- Title: Head coach
- Team: Ouachita Baptist
- Conference: GAC
- Record: 169–107

Biographical details
- Born: c. 1963 or 1964 (age 62–63)
- Education: Delta State University (1986)

Coaching career (HC unless noted)
- 1986–1987: Delta State (GA)
- 1988–1989: Delta State (OL)
- 1990–1992: UTEP (OL)
- 1993–1998: Delta State
- 1999–present: Ouachita Baptist

Administrative career (AD unless noted)
- 2023: AFCA (president)

Head coaching record
- Overall: 197–139–2
- Tournaments: 1–7 (NCAA D-II playoffs)

Accomplishments and honors

Championships
- 1 GSC (1998); 7 GAC (2011, 2014, 2017–2019, 2022, 2024)

Awards
- GSC Coach of the Year (1998); 6× GAC Coach of the Year (2011, 2014, 2017–2019, 2022); 4× AFCA Region Three Coach of the Year (2014, 2018–2019, 2022)

Todd Knight (born c. 1963 or 1964) is an American college football coach. He is the head football coach for Ouachita Baptist University, a position he has held since 1999. He also was the head coach for the Delta State Statesmen football team from 1993 to 1999. He also coached for UTEP.

On January 9, 2023, Knight was voted as the president of the American Football Coaches Association (AFCA).

== Head coaching record ==
Year	Team	Overall	Conference	Standing	Bowl/playoffs	AFCA^{#}	D2^{°}
Delta State Statesmen (Gulf South Conference) (1993–1998)
1993	Delta State	3–7	1–6	7th			
1994	Delta State	3–5–2	2–4–1	5th			
1995	Delta State	5–6	5–4	6th			
1996	Delta State	6–4	6–3	3rd			
1997	Delta State	3–7	3–6	8th			
1998	Delta State	8–3	8–1	T–1st	L NCAA Division II First Round	17	
Delta State:		28–32–2	25–24–1				
Ouachita Baptist Tigers (Lone Star Conference) (1999)
1999	Ouachita Baptist	3–7	1–7	7th (North)			
Ouachita Baptist Tigers (Gulf South Conference) (2000–2010)
2000	Ouachita Baptist	2–8	2–7	T–9th			
2001	Ouachita Baptist	3–7	2–7	10th			
2002	Ouachita Baptist	5–5	5–4	T–5th			
2003	Ouachita Baptist	5–5	4–5	T–5th			
2004	Ouachita Baptist	2–7	2–6	T–9th			
2005	Ouachita Baptist	2–8	2–7	T–9th			
2006	Ouachita Baptist	2–8	1–7	T–8th			
2007	Ouachita Baptist	4–6	2–6	T–8th			
2008	Ouachita Baptist	7–3	5–3	T–4th			
2009	Ouachita Baptist	6–4	4–4	T–5th			
2010	Ouachita Baptist	6–4	4–4	T–6th			
Ouachita Baptist Tigers (Great American Conference) (2011–present)
2011	Ouachita Baptist	7–3	6–1	1st			
2012	Ouachita Baptist	6–4	4–4	T–4th			
2013	Ouachita Baptist	7–3	7–3	3rd			
2014	Ouachita Baptist	10–1	10–0	1st	L NCAA Division II Second Round	9	
2015	Ouachita Baptist	7–4	7–4	T–4th			
2016	Ouachita Baptist	7–4	7–4	T–4th			
2017	Ouachita Baptist	9–3	9–2	1st	L NCAA Division II First Round		
2018	Ouachita Baptist	12–1	11–0	1st	L NCAA Division II Quarterfinal	6	
2019	Ouachita Baptist	11–1	11–0	1st	L NCAA Division II First Round	14	
2020–21	No team—COVID-19						
2021	Ouachita Baptist	9–2	9–2	T–2nd		23	
2022	Ouachita Baptist	11–1	11–0	1st	L NCAA Division II First Round	10	
2023	Ouachita Baptist	9–2	9–2	T–2nd			
2024	Ouachita Baptist	10–2	10–1	T–1st	L NCAA Division II First Round	14	15
2025	Ouachita Baptist	7–4	7–4	T–4th			
2026	Ouachita Baptist	0–0	0–0				
Ouachita Baptist:		169–107	152–94				
Total:		197–139–2					
National championship Conference title Conference division title or championship game berth
