= Jimmy R. Haygood =

American football player (1882–1935)

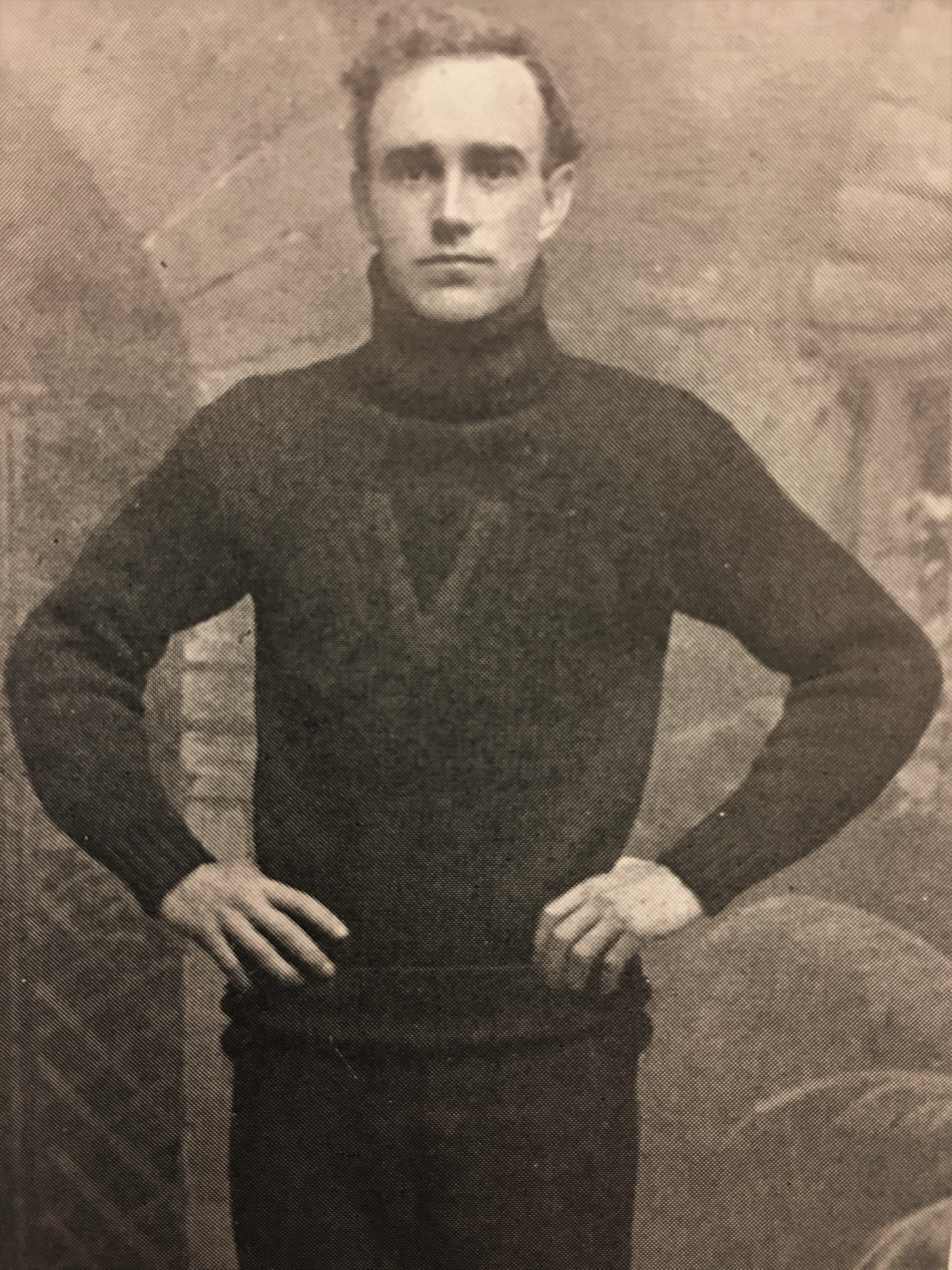

Biographical details
- Born: July 20, 1882; Humphreys County, Tennessee, U.S.
- Died: January 18, 1935 (aged 52); Little Rock, Arkansas, U.S.

Playing career

Football
- 1904–1905: Vanderbilt
- Position: Quarterback

Coaching career (HC unless noted)

Football
- 1907–1918: Henderson/Henderson-Brown
- 1920–1924: Henderson-Brown
- 1925–1927: Southern College
- 1928–1930: Alabama (freshmen)
- 1931–1934: Southwestern (TN)

Basketball
- 1912–1917: Henderson-Brown
- 1925–1926: Southern College

Track
- 1928–1931: Alabama

Head coaching record
- Overall: 75–79–17 (football); 17–15 (basketball)

James Raymond Haygood (July 20, 1882 – January 18, 1935) was an American football player, coach of football, basketball, and track, and college athletics administrator. He played for Dan McGugin's first Vanderbilt Commodores football team in 1904. Haygood served as the head football coach at Henderson-Brown College—now known as Henderson State University—from 1907 to 1918 and again from 1920 to 1924, at Florida Southern College from 1925 to 1927, and at Southwestern University—now known as Rhodes College—from 1931 to 1934.

A native of Waverly, Tennessee, Haygood played college football at Vanderbilt University as quarterback in 1904 and 1905, on teams coached by Dan McGugin. He died of a heart attack, on January 18, 1935, in Little Rock, Arkansas.

== Head coaching record ==
=== Football ===
Year	Team	Overall	Conference	Standing	Bowl/playoffs
Henderson/Henderson-Brown Reddies (Independent) (1907–1918)
1907	Henderson	3–1			
1908	Henderson	4–2			
1909	Henderson	4–2–1			
1910	Henderson	2–2–1			
1911	Henderson-Brown	3–2–1			
1912	Henderson-Brown	5–2			
1913	Henderson-Brown	1–3			
1914	Henderson-Brown	5–3–1			
1915	Henderson-Brown	3–4–1			
1916	Henderson-Brown	4–1–2			
1917	Henderson-Brown	2–2			
1918	Henderson-Brown	1–3			
Henderson-Brown Reddies (Independent) (1920–1924)
1920	Henderson-Brown	2–4			
1921	Henderson-Brown	4–3–1			
1922	Henderson-Brown	2–7			
1923	Henderson-Brown	3–5–1			
1924	Henderson-Brown	3–4–1			
Henderson/Henderson-Brown:		51–50–10			
Southern College Moccasins (Independent) (1925)
1925	Southern College	3–2			
Southern College Moccasins (Southern Intercollegiate Athletic Association) (1926–1927)
1926	Southern College	4–4	2–2	T–14th	
1927	Southern College	2–5–1	2–4–1	T–16th	
Southern College:		9–11–1	4–6–1		
Southwestern Lynx (Dixie Conference / Southern Intercollegiate Athletic Association) (1931–1934)
1931	Southwestern	4–2–3	2–0–1 / 3–1–1	2nd / T–7th	
1932	Southwestern	4–6	2–2 / 3–0	5th / 3rd	
1933	Southwestern	3–4–2	1–3–1 / 1–2	7th / T–20th	
1934	Southwestern	3–6–1	1–3–1 / 1–1–1	6th / T–16th	
Southwestern:		14–18–6			
Total:		74–79–17			
