= Buddy Benson =

American football player and coach (1933–2011)

Biographical details
- Born: November 9, 1933; Wright City, Oklahoma, U.S.
- Died: April 22, 2011 (aged 77); Little Rock, Arkansas, U.S.

Playing career
- 1952: Oklahoma
- 1953–1954: Arkansas

Coaching career (HC unless noted)
- 1956–1957: Lewisville HS (AR)
- 1961–1964: Ouachita Baptist (assistant)
- 1965–1995: Ouachita Baptist

Head coaching record
- Overall: 152–127–2 (college); 17–2–2 (high school)

Jesse N. "Buddy" Benson (November 9, 1933 – April 22, 2011) was an American football player and coach.

Benson played college football at the University of Oklahoma for one season (1952) under head coach Bud Wilkinson before transferring to the University of Arkansas for his final two years.

He served as the head football coach at a high school in Lewisville, Arkansas from 1956 to 1957 before embarking on a coaching career spanning four decades at Ouachita Baptist University in Arkadelphia, Arkansas.

== Head coaching record ==
Year	Team	Overall	Conference	Standing	Bowl/playoffs	NAIA^{#}
Ouachita Baptist Tigers (Arkansas Intercollegiate Conference) (1965–1994)
1965	Ouachita Baptist	5–4–1	3–3–1	T–4th		
1966	Ouachita Baptist	6–4	4–2	T–1st		
1967	Ouachita Baptist	6–4	3–3	5th		
1968	Ouachita Baptist	7–2–1	4–2	T–2nd		
1969	Ouachita Baptist	5–5	2–4	T–5th		
1970	Ouachita Baptist	8–2	5–1	T–1st		15
1971	Ouachita Baptist	7–3	4–2	3rd		
1972	Ouachita Baptist	6–3–1	3–2–1	4th		
1973	Ouachita Baptist	5–5	2–4	T–5th		
1974	Ouachita Baptist	7–2–1	4–1–1	2nd		13
1975	Ouachita Baptist	9–2	5–1	T–1st	L NAIA semifinal	
1976	Ouachita Baptist	5–5	2–4	5th		
1977	Ouachita Baptist	4–6	2–4	T–5th		
1978	Ouachita Baptist	8–2	4–2	3rd		9
1979	Ouachita Baptist	5–5	2–4	T–5th		
1980	Ouachita Baptist	2–8	1–5	T–6th		
1981	Ouachita Baptist	3–6	2–4	T–5th		
1982	Ouachita Baptist	8–3	6–0	1st	L NAIA quarterfinal	8
1983	Ouachita Baptist	2–7–1	1–4–1	5th		
1984	Ouachita Baptist	6–4	3–3	T–3rd		
1985	Ouachita Baptist	7–3	5–2	T–3rd		17
1986	Ouachita Baptist	5–4–1	3–3–1	4th		
1987	Ouachita Baptist	4–4–1	2–4	T–5th		
1988	Ouachita Baptist	4–5–1	2–3–1	T–4th		
1989	Ouachita Baptist	5–5	2–4	5th		20
1990	Ouachita Baptist	5–4	4–2	T–2nd		18
1991	Ouachita Baptist	5–5	3–3	4th		
1992	Ouachita Baptist	2–9	1–5	T–6th		
1993	Ouachita Baptist	3–7	0–4	5th		
1994	Ouachita Baptist	5–5	1–3	4th		
Ouachita Baptist Tigers (NAIA Division I independent) (1995)
1995	Ouachita Baptist	2–7				
Ouachita Baptist:		161–140–8	85–88–6			
Total:		161–140–8				
National championship Conference title Conference division title or championship game berth
