= Jane Ross (philanthropist) =

American businesswoman (1920–1999)

Jane Ross (December 23, 1920 – July 9, 1999) was a prominent American businesswoman and philanthropist from Clark County, Arkansas.

== Early life, World War II service ==
Ross was born in Arkadelphia, Arkansas, the daughter of Hugh Thomas Ross and Esther Clark Ross. She graduated from Henderson State University in 1942. She served as a US Navy photographer for a time in 1943, stationed in Washington DC, and then joined the Women's Army Corps, in which she would serve for the remainder of World War II. For her service during the war, she would receive the Good Conduct Medal, American Theater Medal, and the Victory Medal. Following the war, she would study photography at Rochester Institute of Technology.

Ross returned to Arkadelphia, and opened a photography studio, "Photos by Ross". She owned and operated this studio from 1948 through 1955, but was forced to close the studio to concentrate on the family business following the death of her father, who had previously managed the family business. Her grandfather, J. G. Clark, had amassed a fortune in the timber business in South Arkansas, beginning in the late 1880s. After the death of her father in 1955, Ross became chairwoman of her family's timber industry business and was heiress to that fortune.

== Founding of the "Ross Foundation" ==
In 1966, Ross and her mother established the "Ross Foundation", a philanthropic organization. Following her mother's death the following year, Jane Ross became the chairwoman of the "Ross Foundation", while also remaining chairwoman of the timber business. In 1972 she helped found the "Clark County Historical Association", which is still in operation today.

She allowed family member Ross Whipple to have some control in the operations of the "Ross Foundation" starting in 1979, but she retained control. The foundation created by Jane Ross primarily concentrated on financial assistance in educational programs, mostly confining that assistance to Clark County, and to date continues to assist both Henderson State University as well as Ouachita Baptist University in special projects and scholarship programs. At last tally, the foundation had contributed in excess of $10,000,000 to Clark County-based projects. The foundation opened much of its land holdings to the public, managing a wildlife preserve in Clark County for the endangered red-cockaded woodpeckers, and maintaining hiking trails in Hot Spring County, Arkansas. In addition to these, the foundation has helped fund numerous projects for the Arkansas Children's Hospital in Little Rock, Arkansas. "Group Living", an organization based in Arkadelphia for the betterment of mentally impaired persons, has also been assisted in several projects over the course of many years.

During her lifetime she served in many local public positions, including the Arkadelphia Chamber of Commerce and on the local Girl Scouts of the USA council. She received numerous awards for her charitable contributions made over the years, including being named the "Honorary Paul Harris Fellow" by the Arkadelphia Rotary Club in 1995, and that same year being inducted into the "Arkansas Outdoor Hall of Fame". Also in 1995, she was named "Philanthropist of the Year". Ross was awarded the "Purple and Gold Award" by Ouachita Baptist University in 1983, and in 1984 was named as "Distinguished Alumni" by Henderson State University. Ross never married, devoting her life to the foundation of her creation, and to other projects in both her hometown community and her home state. She died on July 9, 1999, and was buried in "Rosehill Cemetery", in Arkadelphia.
