= Scott Maxfield =

American football player and coach (born c. 1960)

Biographical details
- Born: c. 1960 (age 65–66); Tyler, Texas, U.S.
- Education: United States Sports Academy

Playing career
- 1979–1982: Louisiana Tech
- Position: Guard / center

Coaching career (HC unless noted)
- 1983: Louisiana Tech (SA)
- 1984–1985: Ole Miss (GA)
- 1986–1990: Northwest Mississippi (OL)
- 1991–1993: Northwestern State (DL)
- 1994–1995: Northwestern State (DC)
- 1996–2000: Northwest Mississippi (OC)
- 2001: Pearl River
- 2002–2004: Blinn
- 2005–2023: Henderson State

Head coaching record
- Overall: 134–65 (college); 27–12 (junior college)
- Bowls: 0–1 (college); 1–0 (junior college)
- Tournaments: 1–4 (NCAA D-II playoffs); 0–2 (SWJCFC playoffs)

Accomplishments and honors

Championships
- 1 GSC (2010); 3 GAC (2012–2013, 2015)

Awards
- GSC Coach of the Year (2010); GAC Coach of the Year (2012–2013); AFCA Region Three Coach of the Year (2013)

Scott Maxfield (born c. 1960) is an American former college football coach. He was the head football coach for Henderson State University from 2005 until his retirement following the 2023 season. He also was the head coach for Pearl River Community College in 2001 and Blinn College from 2002 to 2004. He also coached for Louisiana Tech, Ole Miss, Northwest Mississippi Community College, and Northwestern State. He played college football for Louisiana Tech as a guard and center.

== Head coaching record ==
=== College ===
Year	Team	Overall	Conference	Standing	Bowl/playoffs	AFCA^{#}	D2^{°}
Henderson State Reddies (Gulf South Conference) (2005–2010)
2005	Henderson State	3–8	2–7	T–9th			
2006	Henderson State	8–3	6–2	T–3rd			
2007	Henderson State	7–3	6–2	4th			
2008	Henderson State	5–5	4–4	T–6th			
2009	Henderson State	3–7	3–5	T–8th			
2010	Henderson State	7–4	6–2	T–1st			
Henderson State Reddies (Great American Conference) (2011–2023)
2011	Henderson State	6–4	4–1	2nd			
2012	Henderson State	10–1	8–1	1st	L NCAA Division II Second Round	11	
2013	Henderson State	11–1	10–0	1st	L NCAA Division II First Round	13	
2014	Henderson State	9–2	8–2	3rd		25	
2015	Henderson State	11–2	10–1	1st	L NCAA Division II Second Round	12	
2016	Henderson State	8–3	8–3	3rd			
2017	Henderson State	6–5	6–5	6th			
2018	Henderson State	5–6	5–6	T–6th			
2019	Henderson State	9–3	9–2	3rd	L Live United Texarkana		
2020–21	No team—COVID-19						
2021	Henderson State	9–2	9–2	T–2nd			
2022	Henderson State	8–3	8–3	T–3rd			
2023	Henderson State	9–3	9–2	T–2nd	L NCAA Division II First Round	24	23
Henderson State:		134–65	121–50				
Total:		134–65					
National championship Conference title Conference division title or championship game berth

=== Junior college ===
Year	Team	Overall	Conference	Standing	Bowl/playoffs
Pearl River Wildcats (Mississippi Association of Community & Junior Colleges) (2001)
2001	Pearl River	7–2	4–2	T–2nd (South)	
Pearl River:		7–2	4–2		
Blinn Buccaneers (Southwest Junior College Football Conference) (2002–2004)
2002	Blinn	4–5	2–4	T–5th	
2003	Blinn	7–3	4–2	T–3rd	L SWJCFC semifinal
2004	Blinn	9–2	5–1	2nd	L SWJCFC semifinal, W Golden Isle Bowl
Blinn:		20–10	11–7		
Total:		27–12			
