= Greg Holsworth =

American football coach (born c. 1990)

Current position
- Title: Head coach
- Team: Henderson State
- Conference: GAC
- Record: 16–6

Biographical details
- Born: c. 1990 (age 35–36); Mount Vernon, Washington, U.S.
- Education: Occidental College (2012)

Playing career
- 2008–2011: Occidental
- Positions: Linebacker, tight end

Coaching career (HC unless noted)
- 2013: Occidental (LB/S&C)
- 2013: Hoover HS (CA) (DC)
- 2014–2015: Wyoming (GA)
- 2016: Saint Joseph's (IN) (DL/S&C)
- 2017: Henderson State (DL/S&C)
- 2018–2019: Henderson State (DC/DL/S&C)
- 2020–2021: Henderson State (DC/LB/S&C)
- 2022: Henderson State (DC/S&C)
- 2023: Henderson State (AHC/DC)
- 2024–present: Henderson State

Head coaching record
- Overall: 16–6

Accomplishments and honors

Awards
- 3× All-SCIAC (2009–2011)

Greg Holsworth (born c. 1990) is an American college football coach. He is the head football coach for Henderson State University, a position he has held since 2024. He also coached for Occidental, Herbert Hoover High School, Wyoming, and Saint Joseph's (IN). He played college football for Occidental as a linebacker and tight end.

== Head coaching record ==
| Year | Team | Overall | Conference | Standing | Bowl/playoffs |
|---|---|---|---|---|---|
Henderson State Reddies (Great American Conference) (2024–present)
| 2024 | Henderson State | 8–3 | 8–3 | 4th | |
| 2025 | Henderson State | 8–3 | 8–3 | T–2nd | |
| 2026 | Henderson State | 0–0 | 0–0 | | |
| Henderson State: | | 16–6 | 16–6 | | |
| Total: | | 16–6 | | | |
