= Arkansas Association =

Intercollegiate college football conference

The Arkansas Association was an intercollegiate athletic college football conference that existed from 1927 and 1929. Its membership was centered on the state of Arkansas. Its membership subsequently joined the Arkansas Intercollegiate Conference.

== Champions ==
- 1927 – Henderson-Brown and Ouachita Baptist
- 1928 – Henderson-Brown
- 1929 – Henderson State

== See also ==
- List of defunct college football conferences
