= 2012 Central Oklahoma Bronchos football team =

American college football season

2012 Central Oklahoma Bronchos football
- Conference: Mid-America Intercollegiate Athletics Association
- Record: 2–8 (2–8 MIAA)
- Head coach: Nick Bobeck (1st season)
- Home stadium: Wantland Stadium

2012 Mid-America Intercollegiate Athletics Association football standings
	Conf.			Overall
Team	W		L	W		L
No. 5 Missouri Western $^	9	–	1	12	–	2
No. 22 Emporia State #	9	–	2	10	–	2
No. 10 NW Missouri State ^	8	–	2	10	–	3
Pittsburg State	7	–	3	7	–	3
Lindenwood #*	7	–	3	8	–	4
Washburn	7	–	4	7	–	4
Central Missouri	6	–	4	6	–	4
Missouri Southern	5	–	5	6	–	5
Fort Hays State	4	–	6	5	–	6
Northeastern State	4	–	6	4	–	6
Truman	3	–	7	4	–	7
Southwest Baptist	3	–	8	3	–	8
Nebraska–Kearney	2	–	8	3	–	8
Central Oklahoma	2	–	8	2	–	8
Lincoln (MO)	1	–	10	1	–	10
$ – Conference champion; ^ – NCAA Division II playoff participant; # – bowl game participant (Emporia State: Kanza Bowl, Lindenwood: Mineral Water Bowl) * – provisional NCAA Division II member; Rankings from AFCA poll

The 2012 Central Oklahoma Bronchos football team represented the University of Central Oklahoma in the 2012 NCAA Division II football season, the 107th season of Broncho football. The team was led by first year head coach and UCO alumn, Nick Bobeck. They played their home games at Wantland Stadium in Edmond, Oklahoma. This was the Bronchos first year as a member of the Mid-America Intercollegiate Athletics Association (MIAA).

The season began play began with loss to Missouri Southern State at home on August 30, and ended with loss at home to rival Northeastern State on November 10 The Bronchos finished the season 2-8. Each game of the Bronchos 2012 season was a matchup against conference opponents. The Central squad finished the season with both a conference and overall record of 2-8.

== Schedule ==
Date	Time	Opponent	Site	TV	Result	Attendance
August 30	7:00 p.m.	Missouri Southern State	Wantland Stadium; Edmond, OK		L 20–25	?
September 8	6:05 p.m.	at No. 1 Pittsburg State	Carnie Smith Stadium; Pittsburg, KS		L 19–34	?
September 15	1:00 p.m.	at Emporia State	Welch Stadium; Emporia, KS		L 14–42	?
September 22	2:35 p.m.	at No. 9 Wasburn	Wantland Stadium; Edmond, OK	MIAA TV	W 35–20	?
September 29	6:00 p.m.	at No. 7 Missouri Western State	Spratt Stadium; St. Joseph, MO		L 23–45	4,211
October 6	1:00 p.m.	No. 8 Northwest Missouri State	Bearcat Stadium; Maryville, MO		L 10–72	?
October 13(14)	1:30 p.m.	at Central Missouri	Audrey J. Walton Stadium; Warrensburg, MO		L 17–47	?
October 27	2:00 p.m.	at Lincoln (MO)	Dwight T. Reed Stadium; Jefferson City, MO		W 56–25	?
November 3	2:00 p.m.	Southwest Baptist^{†}	Wantland Stadium; Edmond, OK		L 14–26	?
November 10	1:00 p.m.	Northeastern State	Wantland Stadium; Edmond, OK (President's Cup)		L 20–22	?
^{†}Homecoming; Rankings from AFCA DII Coaches' Poll released prior to game; All times are in Central time
