= Ouachita Baptist Tigers football =

2026 Ouachita Baptist Tigers football team
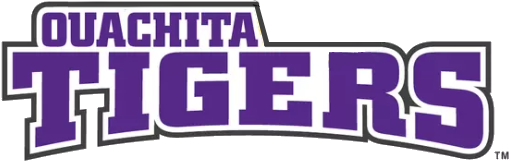
- First season: 1896; 130 years ago
- Athletic director: David Sharp
- Head coach: Todd Knight; 27th season, 169–107 (.612)
- Location: Arkadelphia, Arkansas
- Stadium: Cliff Harris Stadium at Kluck-Benson Field (capacity: 6,500)
- NCAA division: Division II
- Conference: Great American Conference
- Colors: Purple and gold
- All-time record: 474–433–43 (.522)

Conference championships
- 13
- Rivalries: Henderson State (rivalry); Harding
- Website: obutigers.com

The Ouachita Baptist Tigers football program is the intercollegiate American football team for Ouachita Baptist University located in the U.S. state of Arkansas. The team competes in NCAA Division II and are members of the Great American Conference. Ouachita Baptist's first football team was fielded in 1896. The team plays home games at Benson-Williams Field at Cliff Harris Stadium in Arkadelphia, Arkansas. Todd Knight has served as head coach for the Tigers since 1999.

== History ==
The Tiger football team is notable for participating in the first ever Intercollegiate game in Arkansas history, a 24–0 win over the Arkansas Razorbacks in the fall of 1897. The Ouachita Baptist Tigers compete in the Battle of the Ravine every year. This tradition started in 1895 when Ouachita Baptist played Arkadelphia Methodist College (currently known as Henderson State University), and won 8–0. This historical event was not played from 1951 to 1963 because of the excessive rivalry between the two schools. It resumed after 1963 and is still being played to this day.

The Ouachita Baptist head coach from 1965 to 1995 was former Oklahoma Sooner and Arkansas Razorbacks player Buddy Benson. Coach Benson compiled a record of 161–140–8. He played for Bud Wilkinson at Oklahoma, and Bowden Wyatt at Arkansas.

The Tiger's head coach since 1999 is Todd Knight. He has led OBU to six conference titles.

The longtime radio voice of the OBU Tigers is Rex Nelson. Nelson is a member of the Arkansas Sportscasters and Sportswriters Hall of Fame.

On October 19, 2024, the No. 9 nationally ranked Ouachita Baptist Tigers beat the No. 1 ranked Harding Bisons 17–13, marking the first time in OBU history that the Tigers beat the No. 1 team in nation.

=== Conference affiliations ===
- Independent (1897, 1906–1926, 1928–1930)
- No team (1898–1905, 1943–1944)
- Arkansas Association (1927)
- Arkansas Intercollegiate Conference (1931–1942, 1945–1994)
- NAIA Division I independent (1995–1996)
- Lone Star Conference (1997–1999)
- Gulf South Conference (2000–2010)
- Great American Conference (2011–present)

== Championships ==
=== Conference championships ===
Season	Overall record	Conference record
1927*	6–1–2	Arkansas Association
1934	8–2	Arkansas Intercollegiate Conference (AIC)
1941	8–3	AIC
1966*	6–4	AIC
1970*	8–2	AIC
1975*	9–2	AIC
1982	8–3	AIC
2011	7–3	Great American Conference (GAC)
2014	10–1	GAC
2017	9–3	GAC
2018	12–1	GAC
2019	11–1	GAC
2022	11–1	GAC
2024*	10–2	GAC

*Indicates co-championship

== Postseason appearances ==
=== NCAA Division II ===
The Tigers have made seven appearances in the NCAA Division II playoffs, with a combined record of 1–7.

Year	Round	Opponent	Result
2014	Second Round	Minnesota–Duluth	L, 45–48
2017	First Round	Ferris State	L, 19–24
2018	Second Round; Quarterfinals	Indianapolis; Ferris State	W, 35–7; L, 14–37
2019	First Round	Lindenwood	L, 38–41
2022	First Round	Northwest Missouri State	L, 17–47
2024	First Round	Central Oklahoma	L, 31–38 ^{OT}
2026	First Round	NW Missouri State	L, 14–45

=== NAIA Division I ===
The Tigers have made two appearances in the NAIA Division I playoffs, with a combined record of 0–2.

Year	Round	Opponent	Result
1975	Semifinals	Salem	L, 7–21
1982	Quarterfinals	Northeastern State	L, 23–38

== Notable former players ==
=== Former NFL players ===
- Carl Allen, RB/DB, Brooklyn Dodgers
- Cliff Harris, DB, Dallas Cowboys, member of the Pro Football Hall of Fame
- Gregory Junior, DB, Jacksonville Jaguars
- Bill LaFitte, E, Brooklyn Tigers
- Ed Neal, OL, Green Bay Packers
- Julius Pruitt, WR, Miami Dolphins
- Chuck Taylor, LB, Brooklyn Tigers
- Chris Rycraw, RB, Green Bay Packers
- Phillip Supernaw, TE, Tennessee Titans
