= Carpenter–Haygood Stadium =

American football stadium in Arkadelphia, Arkansas

Carpenter-Haygood Stadium
- Interactive map of Carpenter-Haygood Stadium
- Former names: Haygood Stadium
- Location: 1492 M H Russell Rd; Arkadelphia, AR 71923
- Coordinates: 34°8′4″N 93°3′48″W
- Owner: Henderson State University
- Capacity: 9,600
- Surface: GeoGreen
- Record attendance: 12,228

Construction
- Opened: 1968
- Renovated: 2011

Tenant
- Henderson State Reddies

Carpenter–Haygood Stadium is an American football stadium in Arkadelphia, Arkansas that serves as the home field for the Henderson State Reddies.

The stadium opened in 1968 and was named in honor of Jimmy R. Haygood, who was Henderson State's head football coach from 1907 to 1924. "Carpenter" was added to the stadium name in 1990 to honor former coach Ralph Carpenter, who died on February 16, 1990, after serving as head coach for 19 years.

A GeoGreen surface was installed in 2011.
