= Henderson State Reddies football =

College football team

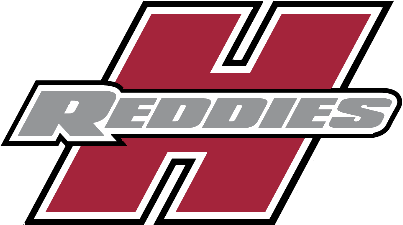
- First season: 1905; 121 years ago
- Athletic director: Seth Dutton
- Head coach: Greg Holsworth; 3rd season, 16–6 (.727)
- Location: Arkadelphia, Arkansas
- Stadium: Carpenter-Haygood Stadium (capacity: 9,600)
- Conference: Great American Conference
- Colors: Red and gray

Conference championships
- 15
- Consensus All-Americans: 25
- Rivalries: Ouachita Baptist
- Fight song: That Old Reddie Spirit
- Marching band: The Showband of Arkansas
- Website: hsusports.com/football

The Henderson State Reddies football program is a college football team that represents Henderson State University. The team is a member of the Great American Conference which is in the Division II of the National Collegiate Athletic Association and are currently coached by Greg Holsworth. Home games are played at Carpenter-Haygood Stadium in Arkadelphia, Arkansas. Henderson State shares the longest rivalry in Division II football with Ouachita Baptist Tigers, the Battle of the Ravine, which began in 1895. Gus Malzahn, deemed the father of the Hurry Up, No Huddle offense played wide receiver for the Reddies, and is one of their most famous alumni.

== All Americans ==
2024 Caden Davis TE

== Playoff appearances ==
=== NAIA ===
The Reddies made two appearances in the NAIA playoffs, with a combined record of 1–2.

| Year | Round | Opponent | Result |
|---|---|---|---|
| 1974 | Quarterfinals | Elon | L, 7–21 |
| 1985 | Quarterfinals; Semifinals | Central State (OK); Central Arkansas | W, 18–15; L, 9–21 |

=== NCAA Division II ===
The Reddies have made four appearances in the NCAA Division II playoffs, with a combined record of 1–4.

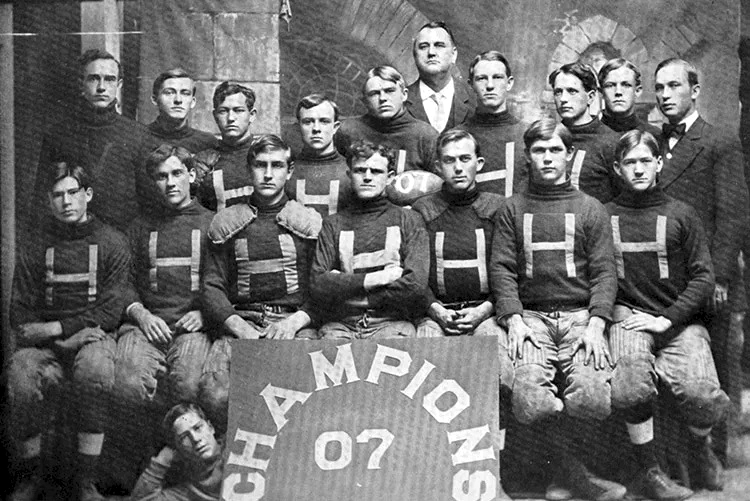
Henderson football team of 1907

| Year | Round | Opponent | Result |
|---|---|---|---|
| 2012 | Regional semifinals | Missouri Western | L, 21–45 |
| 2013 | First round | St. Cloud State | L, 35–40 |
| 2015 | First round Regional semifinals | Sioux Falls; Emporia State | W, 23–16; L, 3–29 |
| 2023 | First round | Central Missouri | L, 14–56 |

== Head coaches ==
The Henderson State Reddies have had 18 head coaches since they began play in 1905.

The team has played 1,028 games in 116 seasons of Reddie football. In that time, Scott Maxfield led the Reddies to four postseason bowl games. Seven coaches have won conference championships: Bo Rowland, Bo Sherman, Duke Wells, Jim Mack Sawyer, Clyde Berry, Sporty Carpenter, and Scott Maxfield. Jimmy Haygood also claimed four Arkansas state championships.

Sporty Carpenter is the leader in seasons coached and games won, with 119 victories during his 19 years at Henderson. J.H. Lassiter has the highest winning percentage with .833. Patrick Nix has the lowest winning percentage with .136.

The current head coach is Greg Holsworth, who was hired in 2024.

== Rivalries ==
=== Hendrix College Bulldogs ===
Hendrix College, then known as the Bulldogs, was Henderson's main athletics rival during its early years (1905-1929). After Henderson transitioned from a private Methodist college to a state college in 1929, differences in enrollment numbers and conference affiliations led to the decline of the rivalry.
