= Henderson State Reddies =

- University: Henderson State University
- Nickname: Reddies
- NCAA: Division II
- Conference: Great American Conference
- Athletic director: Seth Dutton
- Location: Arkadelphia, Arkansas
- Varsity teams: 13 (5 men's, 7 women's, 1 co-ed)
- Football stadium: Carpenter-Haygood Stadium at Ruggles Field
- Basketball arena: Duke Wells Center
- Baseball stadium: Clyde Berry Field
- Other venues: Red Wave Natatorium
- Colors: Red and gray
- Mascot: Reddie Spirit
- Website: hsusports.com
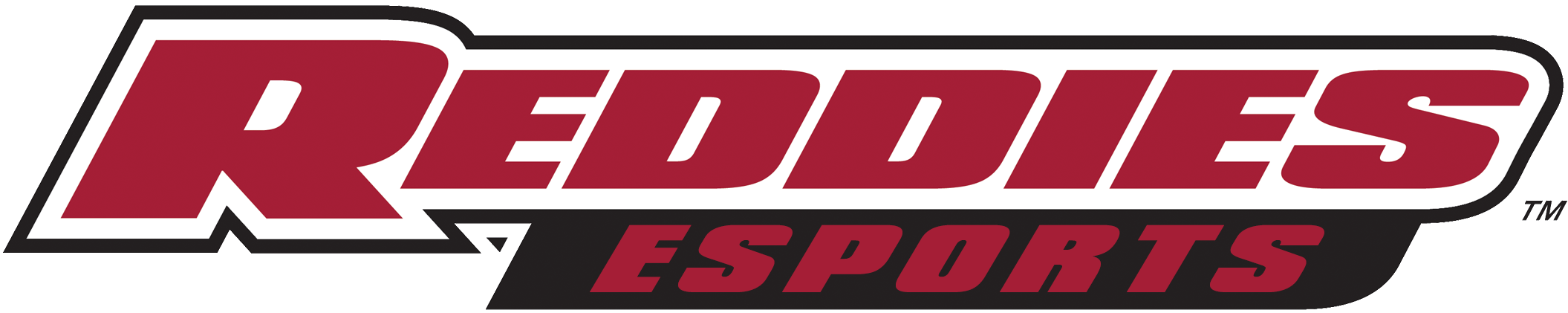

The Henderson State Reddies is the school mascot and athletic emblem for Henderson State University, located in Arkadelphia, Arkansas. Henderson athletic teams compete in NCAA Division II intercollegiate sports and they are members of the Great American Conference for all 12 varsity sports.

Upon its establishment in 1905, the Henderson State football team became known for wearing red jerseys. Absent a traditional nickname or mascot, the team was appropriately dubbed the “Reds.” Eventually, the name shifted to “Reddies,” and it stuck.

== Sports sponsored ==
Men's sports	Women's sports
Baseball	Basketball
Basketball	Cross Country
Football	Golf
Golf	Softball
Swimming & Diving	Swimming & Diving
	Tennis
	Volleyball

=== Baseball ===
Henderson State has had 7 Major League Baseball draft selections since the draft began in 1965.

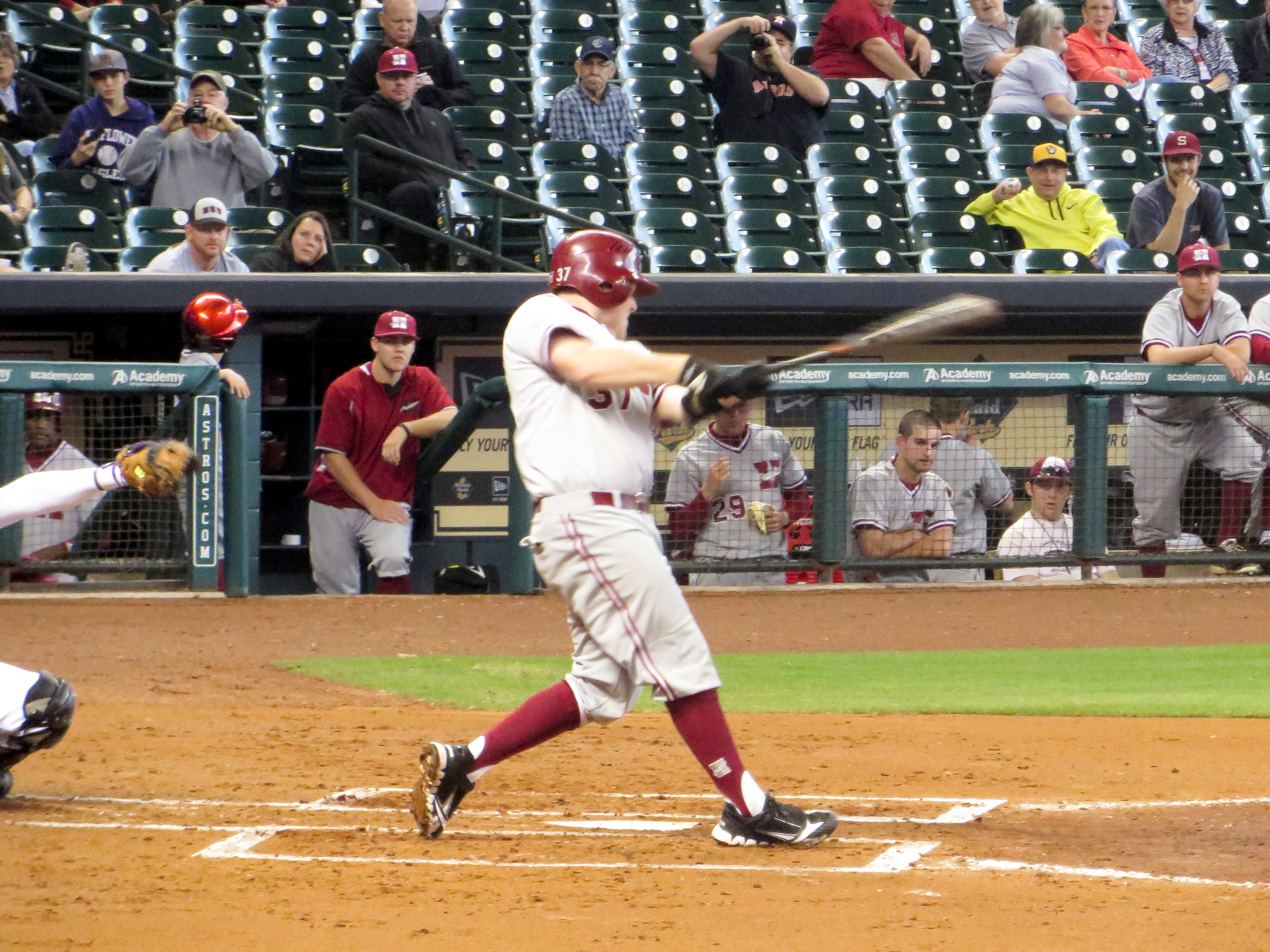
Andrew Reynolds in 2014

Year	Player	Round	Team
1965	Freddy Dawson	10	Yankees
1969	Mike Powers	25	Giants
1975	Tim Stuthard	22	Expos
1983	Curtis Thurston	24	Pirates
1991	Lanny Williams	12	Rangers
2010	Jonathan Dooley	26	Royals
2017	Chris Hunt	39	Cardinals

== Sports culture ==
=== Battle of the Ravine ===
The Battle of the Ravine is a rivalry game between Henderson State University and Ouachita Baptist University. It is currently the oldest rivalry of any NCAA Division II institutions. The first game was played on November 8, 1895 (Thanksgiving Day) and Ouachita College beat Arkadelphia Methodist College 8–0. The next meeting did not occur until 1907 in the first sanctioned game of the series. The Reddies defeated Ouachita and went on to claim the Arkansas State Championship.

The Reddies went on to win the next six meetings and the game was played on Thanksgiving Day. Both teams also made the game their homecoming. The series was discontinued in 1951 after Henderson won 54–0 and the pranks got out of control. The series resumed in 1963 with the Reddies winning 28–13. The series continued until 1993 when Henderson State moved to the NCAA Division II Gulf South Conference. It continued again in 1996 when Ouachita Baptist University moved to the Lone Star Conference. OBU joined the GSC in 2000 and the two schools did not play each other in 2004 or 2005 as a result of schedule rotation. In total, the two schools have met 85 times. Henderson State currently leads the series 41–39–6.

== Showband of Arkansas ==
Their marching band, the “Showband of Arkansas” consists of 150 winds, percussion, and auxiliary members. The mission of the “Showband of Arkansas” is to represent, foster and promote the “Reddie Spirit” through musical and visual performance. Composed of students from all academic disciplines, the “Showband of Arkansas” frequently performs as the feature band at high school marching contests, enjoys travel to away-games and regularly entertains thousands of Reddie spectators at home football games. It is open to any student by audition, regardless of major.
