= Henderson State University =

Public university in Arkadelphia, Arkansas, U.S.

Coordinates: 34°7′50.44″N 93°3′31.72″W

- Former names: Arkadelphia Methodist College (1890–1904); Henderson College (1904–1911); Henderson-Brown College (1911–1929); Henderson State Teachers College (1929–1967); Henderson State College (1967–1975)
- Type: Public university
- Established: 1890; 136 years ago
- Parent institution: Arkansas State University System
- Academic affiliations: Space-grant
- Endowment: $39.3 million (2026)
- Chancellor: Trey Berry
- Administrative staff: 186
- Undergraduates: 2,258 (fall 2025)
- Postgraduates: 577 (fall 2025)
- Location: Arkadelphia, Arkansas, United States
- Campus: Rural 151 acres (0.61 km^{2})
- Colors: Red and gray
- Nickname: Reddies
- Sporting affiliations: NCAA Division II –GAC
- Website: hsu.edu

Henderson State University (HSU) is a public university in Arkadelphia, Arkansas, United States. Founded in 1890 as Arkadelphia Methodist College, Henderson has an undergraduate enrollment of around 2,500 students. The campus is located on 156 acres (0.63 km^{2}).

== History ==
Henderson State University is the only university in the State of Arkansas to have been controlled by both church and state. It is also the only public university in the state to be named for an individual; it was renamed for Charles Christopher Henderson, a trustee and prominent Arkadelphia businessman, on May 23, 1904. Overall, the university has operated under six different names: Arkadelphia Methodist College (1890–1904), Henderson College (1904–1911), Henderson-Brown College (1911–1929), Henderson State Teachers College (1929–1967), Henderson State College (1967–1975) and Henderson State University (1975–present).

Arkadelphia Methodist College was founded on March 24, 1890, nearly five months after Arkadelphia city leaders and members of the Methodist Episcopal Church, South unsuccessfully tried to lure Hendrix College to Arkadelphia.

On September 3, 1890, Arkadelphia Methodist College opened its doors to 110 students and 10 faculty members. The college also served as an academy, providing high school–level education, until 1925.

In 1913, the university football team's name began to shift from "Reds" and/or "Red Jackets" to "Reddies." The Henderson State athletic programs and student body are affectionately called Reddies to this day.

In 1929, the university, known then as Henderson Brown College, was pressured to merge with Hendrix College by the Arkansas Methodist Conferences. However, Arkadelphians and southern Arkansan leaders refused to let the institution leave and offered it to the State of Arkansas. The Arkansas General Assembly passed Act 46 to "establish a standard Teachers College in Arkadelphia," turning Henderson Brown College into Henderson State Teachers College.

=== Presidents and chancellors ===
Presidents and chancellors of the university have included:

- George Childs Jones (1890–1897, 1899–1904)
- Cadesman Pope (1897–1899)
- John Hartwell Hinemon (1904–1911)
- George Henry Crowell (1911–1915)
- James Mims Workman (1915–1926)
- Clifford Lee Hornaday (1926–1928)
- James Warthen Workman (1928–1929)
- Joseph Pitts Womack (1929–1939)
- Joseph A. Day (1939–1941)
- Matt Locke Ellis (1941–1945)
- Dean D. McBrien (1945–1963)
- M. H. Russell (1963–1969)
- Martin B. Garrison (1970–1986)
- Charles DeWitt Dunn (1986–2008)
- Charles Welch (2008–2011)
- Bobby G. Jones (2011–2012, acting president)
- Glendell Jones Jr. (2012–2019, last president)
- Elaine Kneebone (2019–2020, acting president)
- Jim Borsig (2020–2021, acting chancellor)
- Charles Ambrose (2021–2023, first chancellor)
- Bob Fisher (2023, acting chancellor)
- Trey Berry (2024–present)

=== Glen Jones years and subsequent financial crisis ===
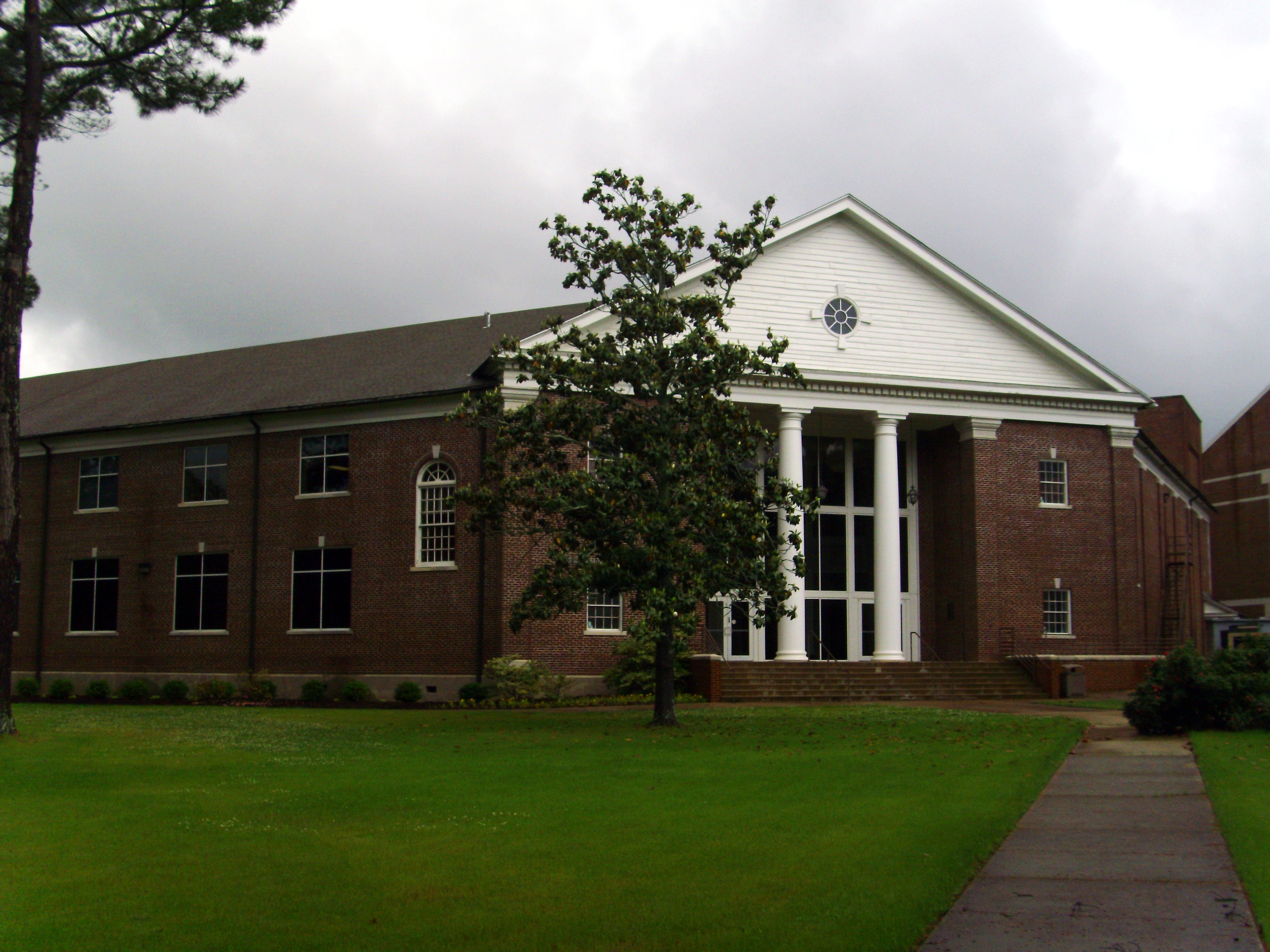
Arkansas Hall

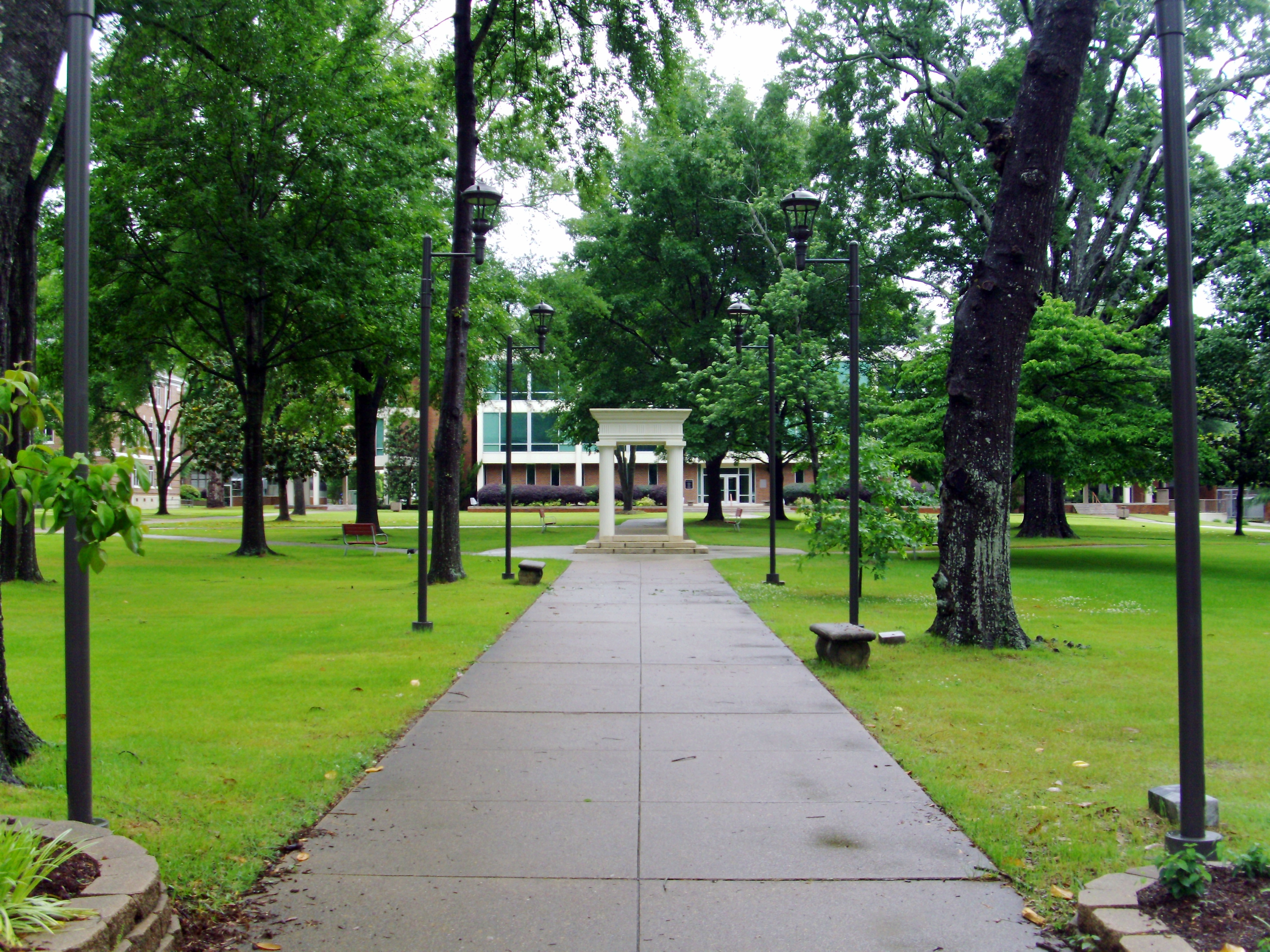
HSU campus

Glendell Jones Jr. was named Henderson State University's 17th president on Tuesday, March 6, 2012, and officially assumed presidential duties on July 1, 2012. His tenure as president was marked by a series of scandals and bad publicity. He and his senior leadership were twice the subject of no-confidence votes by the faculty. These votes were not heeded by the university's board of trustees. When the true scope of the university's budget crisis became public in July 2019, Jones was asked to resign.

Jones—as well as several other current and former administrators, staff, and members of the board of trustees—were called to testify before the Arkansas legislature in 2020 as part of the state's effort to understand the university's financial collapse.

Following Jones' resignation, then-general counsel Elaine Kneebone was named acting president. She was replaced by interim President/Chancellor Jim Borsig, who resigned in early 2021, citing health concerns. Chuck Ambrose was hired in November 2021 as the first permanent head of the institution in over two years.

On October 24, 2019, the Henderson State Board of Trustees voted unanimously to join the Arkansas State University System based in Little Rock.

In February 2022, the university, claiming a pending cash shortfall of over $12 million, declared financial exigency and announced plans to begin cuts to personnel and programs in an effort to "right-size" the university and avert the university's closure.

On May 2, 2022, 37% of faculty received phone calls from the chancellor's office that their positions had been terminated, 12 departments were excised entirely, eliminating many degree programs. The university cut 67 faculty positions, of which 44 were tenured. Students and faculty protested the sweeping changes, and on May 4, the Faculty Senate voted no confidence in the administration. On May 5, the ASUS Board dismissed the vote of no confidence and approved Chancellor Ambrose's recommendations for program and faculty cuts. Over a year later, Ambrose announced his resignation, effective September 15, 2023. ASU System President Charles Welch later announced the selection of Bob Fisher, a native of Arkadelphia and former president of Belmont University, as interim chancellor of Henderson State.

=== 2019 campus methamphetamine synthesis incident ===
In October 2019, police responded to a campus chemistry laboratory at the Reynolds Science Center following concerns of chemical odors resulting in the building's closure for several weeks. Initial investigation found elevated levels of benzyl chloride and subsequently found methamphetamine residues. Two chemistry professors were arrested and charged with manufacturing methamphetamine.

== Undergraduate demographics ==
Fall 2023
Race and ethnicity	Total
White	54%
Black	34%
Hispanic	4%
Two or more races	4%
International student	2%
Asian	1%
American Indian/Alaska Native	1%
Economic diversity
Low-income (Note: The percentage of students who received an income-based federal Pell grant intended for low-income students.)	46%
Affluent (Note: The percentage of students who are a part of the American middle class at the bare minimum.)	54%

== Athletics ==
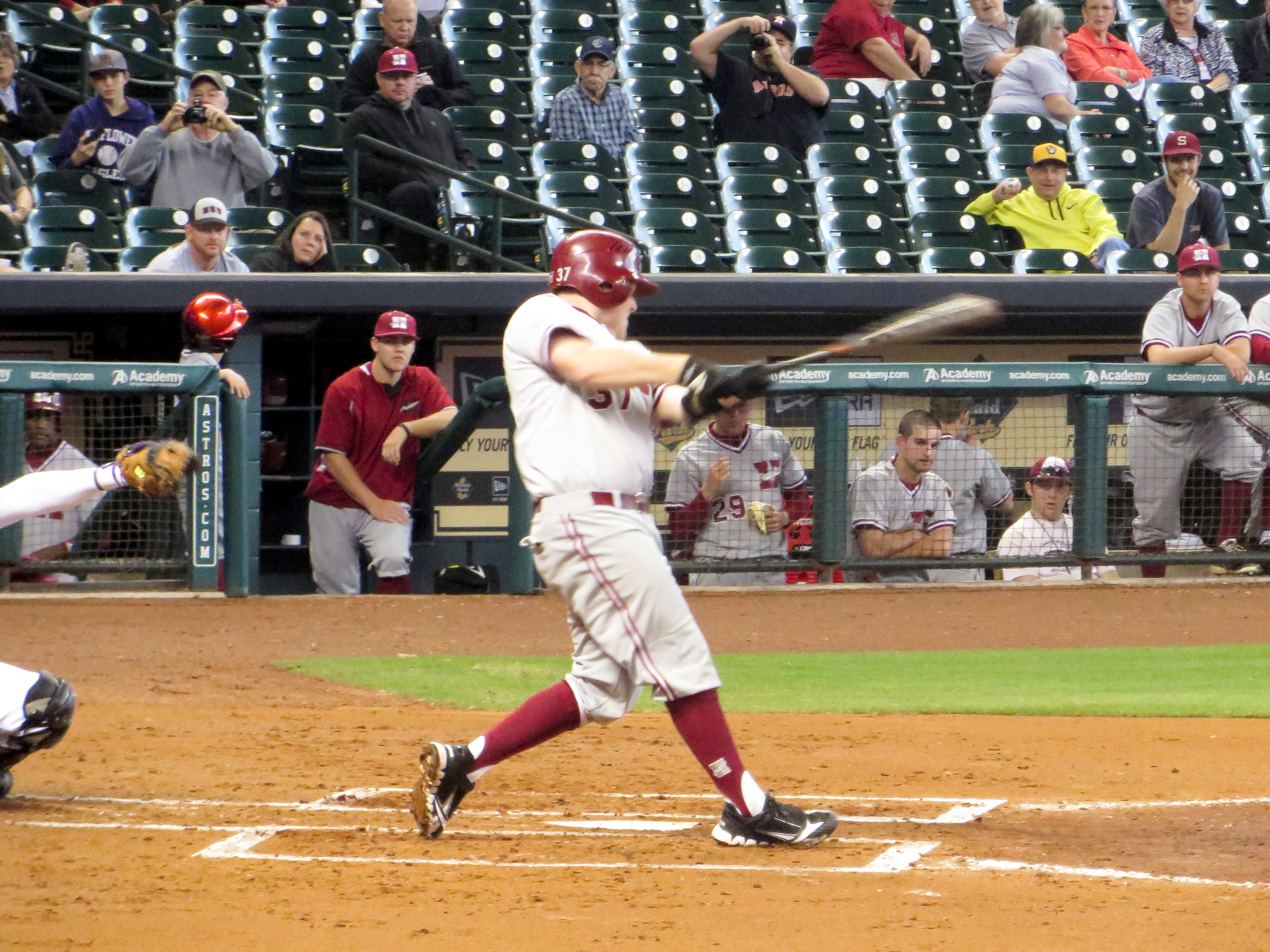
Baseball player Andrew Reynolds in 2014

Henderson State's athletic teams are the Reddies. The university is a member in the Division II level of the National Collegiate Athletic Association (NCAA), primarily competing in the Great American Conference since the 2011–12 academic year. The Reddies previously competed in the Gulf South Conference (GSC) from 1993–94 to 2010–11; as well as the defunct Arkansas Intercollegiate Conference (AIC) of the National Association of Intercollegiate Athletics (NAIA) from 1930–31 to 1992–93.

Henderson State sponsors in 15 intercollegiate sports: Men's sports include baseball, basketball, football, golf, swimming & diving, and track & field; women's sports include basketball, cross country, golf, softball, swimming & diving, tennis, track & field, and volleyball. The university also has a co-ed cheer and pom squad.

=== Football ===
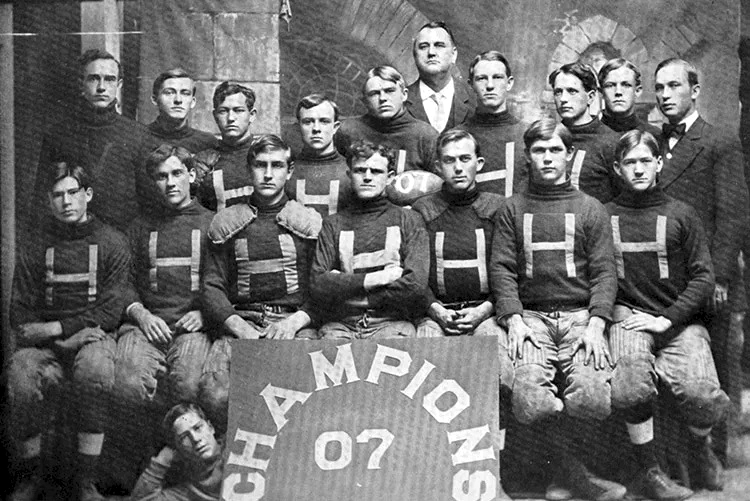
Henderson football team of 1907

The university's football team's home games are played at Carpenter-Haygood Stadium in Arkadelphia. Henderson State shares the longest rivalry in Division II football with Ouachita Baptist University Tigers, the Battle of the Ravine, which began in 1895.

== Notable alumni ==
- Bobby Bones, host of the nationally syndicated radio show Bobby Bones Show
- Lloyd L. Burke 1950, Medal of Honor recipient
- Osro Cobb, Republican politician and lawyer
- Ken Duke, professional golfer
- Bob Fisher, past president of Belmont University
- Roy Green, 1979, former American football wide receiver in the National Football League
- Tony Johns, Canadian football player
- Jimmie O. Keenan, major general, United States Army, former chief of the United States Army Nurse Corps
- David Kerr, baseball executive, General Manager of Mississippi Mud Monsters
- Gus Malzahn, 1990, American football coach; former head football coach at Arkansas State University, Auburn University and University of Central Florida
- John P. McConnell, 1927, general and chief of staff, United States Air Force
- Sean McGrath, 2012, former American football tight end in the National Football League
- Sid McMath, 34th governor of Arkansas (1949–1953)
- Pat Pappas, member of the Arkansas House of Representatives
- Aaron Owens, 1999, former AND1 Mixtape Tour basketball player
- David Pryor, 39th governor of Arkansas (1975–1979), US senator (1979–1997), and US representative from Arkansas's 4th district (1966–1973)
- Reggie Ritter, 1982, former Major League baseball player for the Cleveland Indians and the only HSU graduate to play in the Major Leagues
- Jane Ross, co-founder of the Ross Foundation
- Jimmy D. Ross, 1958, 4-star general and member of the board of two corporations, United States Army
- G. Lloyd Spencer, US senator from Arkansas
- Robert Thomas, former professional football player for the Dallas Cowboys
- Billy Bob Thornton (attended), Academy Award-winning screenwriter, actor, director, playwright, and singer
- Delores White, All-American Girls Professional Baseball League baseball player
- Jeremy Williams, American player of Canadian football
- C. Vann Woodward, 1959, Sterling Professor of History at Yale University; Pulitzer Prize-winning historian

== See also ==
- Education in Arkansas
