= 2012–13 Great American Conference championships =

Great American Conference
- Conference: NCAA
- Founded: 2011
- Division: Division II

The Great American Conference sponsors championship events for 12 of its 13 sports. The football champion is the team with the best conference record.

Northwestern Oklahoma State and Southern Nazarene were provisional members and not eligible for regular season championships or postseason championship tournaments. Individuals were eligible for postseason honors and may compete in cross country and golf postseason championships but not eligible for titles.

== Men's Cross Country ==
Champion
Team – East Central
Individual – Mickey Hammer, Southern Arkansas

East Central University placed three runners in the top four and all seven competitors finished inside the top 15 as the Tigers repeated as Great American Conference Men's Cross Country Champions.

Southern Arkansas' Mickey Hammer emerged as the individual champion, fending off ECU's Cale Eidson.

- Runner of the Year

Mickey Hammer, Southern Arkansas

- Freshman of the Year

Arturo Nava, East Central

- Coach of the Year

Steve Sawyer, East Central

- All-GAC Team

Mickey Hammer, Southern Arkansas
Cale Eidson, East Central
Arturo Nava, East Central
Austin Christian, East Central
Lajos Farkas, Harding
Andrew Leahey, Southern Nazarene
Victor Others, Southern Nazarene
Matthew Cumpian, Harding
Logan Green, Harding
Jonathan Ogan, East Central

=== Championships ===
Saturday, October 20
Host: East Central University (Ada, OK)

Team			Individual (Top Ten)		
1	East Central	26	1	Mickey Hammer (SAU)	25:28.3
2	Harding	43	2	Cale Eidson (ECU)	25:39.2
3	Southern Arkansas	64	3	Arturo Nava (ECU)	26:17.1
4	Arkansas-Monticello	120	4	Austin Christian (ECU)	26:20.6
			5	Lajos Farkas (HU)	26:26.9
			6	Andrew Leahey (SNU)	26:32.5
			7	Victor Others (SNU)	26:32.7
			8	Matthew Cumpian (HU)	26:48.9
			9	Logan Green (HU)	26:55.5
			10	Jonathan Ogan (ECU)	27:04.1

== Women's Cross Country ==
Champion
Team – East Central
Individual – Ewa Zaborowska, Harding

East Central won its first Great American Conference Women's Cross Country championship title as the Lady Tigers edged out 2011 champion Harding.

Harding sophomore Ewa Zaborowska dominated the race, winning by more than a minute to claim the individual title.

- Runner of the Year

Ewa Zaborowska, Harding

- Freshman of the Year

Kelsey Taylor, Harding

- Coach of the Year

Steve Sawyer, East Central

- All-GAC 1st Team

Ewa Zaborowska, Harding
Samantha Bartlett, East Central
ReGina Germaine, East Central
Kelsey Taylor, Harding
Andrea McKinney, East Central
Megan Johnson, Southern Nazarene
Virginia Ney, Southern Arkansas
Colleta Maiyo, East Central
Kelsey Grier, Southern Arkansas
Tammy Kim, Harding

- All-GAC 2nd Team

Dallis Bailey, Harding
Katie Bruner, East Central
Rachel Roberts, Harding
Chelsey Dillon, Southwestern Oklahoma State
Taylor Scott, Southwestern Oklahoma State
Johanna Casey, Ouachita Baptist
Carissa Curtis, Southwestern Oklahoma State
Emily Hickey, Southwestern Oklahoma State
Minhuyen Nguyen, East Central
Carli Langley, Southern Arkansas

=== Championships ===
Saturday, October 20
Host: East Central University (Ada, OK)

Team			Individual (Top Ten)		
1	East Central	28	1	Ewa Zaborowska (HU)	18:18.5
2	Harding	36	2	Samantha Bartlett (ECU)	19:40.8
3	Southern Arkansas	80	3	ReGina Germaine (ECU)	19:44.0
4	Southwestern Oklahoma State	81	4	Kelsey Taylor (HU)	19:51.3
5	Ouachita Baptist	146	5	Andrea McKinney (ECU)	19:57.3
6	Henderson State	196	6	Megan Johnson (SNU)	20:03.6
7	Arkansas Tech	199	7	Virginia Ney (SAU)	20:13.1
8	Southeastern Oklahoma State	234	8	Colleta Maiyo (ECU)	20:14.4
9	Arkansas-Monticello	247	9	Kelsey Grier (SAU)	20:15.6
			10	Tammy Kim (HU)	20:16.9

== Women's Soccer ==
Champion
Southwestern Oklahoma State

Down a goal late in the Great American Conference Women’s Soccer Championship, top seeded Southwestern Oklahoma State pulled off a dramatic comeback with two goals in a three-minute span to stun Ouachita Baptist 2-1 to claim the tournament title.

- Offensive Player of the Year

Josie Price, Southwestern Oklahoma State

- Defender of the Year

Kira Bertrand, Southwestern Oklahoma State

- Goalkeeper of the Year

Corey LaMoureaux, Southwestern Oklahoma State

- Freshman of the Year

Ashlee Beitinger, Southwestern Oklahoma State

- Coach of the Year

Mark Persson, Southwestern Oklahoma State

- All-GAC 1st Team

F - Ashley Bradford, East Central
F - Sherri Collins, Southern Nazarene
F - Kelsey Visor, Southwestern Oklahoma
F - Samantha Nunez, Southwestern Oklahoma State
M - Taylor Marsh, Northwestern Oklahoma State
M - Bekah Stewart, Southern Nazarene
M - Josie Price, Southwestern Oklahoma State
M - Jessica Carbonara, Southwestern Oklahoma State
D - Margaret Glutz, East Central
D - Hannah Hatcher, Harding
D - Carrie Lieblong, Ouachita Baptist
D - Kira Bertrand, Southwestern Oklahoma State
GK - Corey LaMoureaux, Southwestern Oklahoma State

- All-GAC 2nd Team

F - Jenna Taylor, Harding
F - Mallary Schaub, Southern Nazarene
F - Cori Kelly Southwestern, Oklahoma State
M - Katie Glutz, East Central
M - Lauren Hatch, Ouachita Baptist
M - Kayla Thompson, Southern Nazarene
M - Ashlee Beitinger, Southwestern Oklahoma State
D - Carla Rodriguez, East Central
D - Cathy Wabenga, Northwestern Oklahoma State
D - Rachel Atnip, Southern Nazarene
D - Sara Eguren, Southern Nazarene
D - Ericka Ramirez, Southern Nazarene
GK - Shelby Shepherd, Ouachita Baptist
GK - Caitlin Thorpe, Northwestern Oklahoma State

- All-GAC Honorable Mention

GK - Yoli Zamarripa, Southern Nazarene

=== Standings ===
Team	Conference		Overall	
Southwestern Oklahoma State	9-0-1	28	20-1-1	.932
Southern Nazarene	5-4-1	16	13-8-1	.614
East Central	4-4-2	14	4-11-4	.316
Ouachita Baptist	4-5-1	13	10-8-1	.553
Harding	4-5-1	13	7-9-2	.444
Northwestern Oklahoma State	0-8-2	2	0-16-2	.056

=== Tournament ===
Friday-Sunday, November 2–4
Host: Southwestern Oklahoma State University (Weatherford, OK)

Semifinals
1	Southwestern Oklahoma State	4
4	Harding	0
2	East Central	0
3	Ouachita Baptist	1

Finals
1	Southwestern Oklahoma State	2
3	Ouachita Baptist	1

- All-Tournament Team

Jessica Carbonara, Southwestern Oklahoma State (Most Valuable Player)
Kira Bertrand, Southwestern Oklahoma State
Natalie Crosslin, Southwestern Oklahoma State
Kelsey Visor, Southwestern Oklahoma State
Josie Price, Southwestern Oklahoma State
Carrie Lieblong, Ouachita Baptist
Lauren Hatch, Ouachita Baptist
Mary Whisenhunt, Ouachita Baptist
Lauren Scharf, Harding
Hannah Hatcher, Harding
Andi Reagan, East Central
Mollie Hummel, East Central

== Volleyball ==
Champion
Harding

One year after losing to Arkansas Tech in the Great American Conference Volleyball Championship final, Harding reversed its fate with a resounding four-set victory Saturday at the Rhodes Field House. After splitting the first two sets, the Lady Bisons won going away, 25-12 in the third set and 25-16 in the final set.

Like in their final regular season meeting, Arkansas Tech started strong and took the first set.

- Player of the Year

Mollie Arnold, Harding

- Newcomer of the Year

Denise De Vine, Southern Arkansas

- Freshman of the Year

Megan Kunkel, Southeastern Oklahoma State

- Coach of the Year

Meredith Fear, Harding

- All-GAC 1st Team

S - Amber Cerrillos, Arkansas Tech
MB - Sara Motsinger, Arkansas Tech
OH - Carly Florian, Arkansas Tech
MB - Brittany Ryan, Arkansas Tech
MB - Tatiana Booth, East Central
OH - Mollie Arnold, Harding
S - Amber Schinzing, Harding
OH - Denise De Vine, Southern Arkansas

- All-GAC 2nd Team

OH - Amy Kleypas, Arkansas-Monticello
MB - Liv Savage, Harding
MB - Alyssa Short, Harding
OH - Ty Lindberg, Henderson State
L - Allison Frizzell, Ouachita Baptist
OP - Emily Gentle, Southeastern Oklahoma State
L - Lauren Woods, Southern Arkansas
MB - Alison Cole, Southwestern Oklahoma State

- All-GAC Honorable Mention

L - Allison Beardsley, Arkansas-Monticello
OH - Kaitlyn White, Arkansas Tech
OP - Bailee Graham, Harding
MB - Jessica Moss, Henderson State
MB - Megan Askew, Ouachita Baptist
OP - Abby Pickett, Ouachita Baptist
OH - Megan Kunkel, Southeastern Oklahoma State
S - Madelynne Cera, Southeastern Oklahoma State
OP - Courtney Smith, Southern Arkansas
S - Klaire Blasco Vine, Southern Arkansas
OH - Natalia Oliveira, Southern Nazarene
S - Lindsay Dusin, Southwestern Oklahoma State

=== Standings ===
Team	Conference		Overall	
Harding	14-0	1.000	28-6	.824
Arkansas Tech	11-3	.786	27-10	.730
Southern Arkansas	11-3	.786	23-12	.657
Southwestern Oklahoma State	10-4	.714	13-20	.394
Southern Nazarene	8-6	.571	13-19	.406
Ouachita Baptist	7-7	.500	10-17	.370
East Central	7-7	.500	10-23	.303
Arkansas-Monticello	4-10	.286	11-24	.314
Southeastern Oklahoma State	3-11	.214	5-28	.152
Henderson State	2-12	.143	7-23	.233
Northwestern Oklahoma State	0-14	.000	2-27	.069

=== Tournament ===
Thursday-Saturday, November 15–17
Host: Harding University (Searcy, AR)

Quarterfinals
1	Harding	3
8	Southeastern Oklahoma State	0
4	Southwestern Oklahoma State	3
5	Ouachita Baptist	1
2	Arkansas Tech	3
7	Arkansas-Monticello	0
3	Southern Arkansas	3
6	East Central	2

Semifinals
1	Harding	3
4	Southwestern Oklahoma State	2
3	Arkansas Tech	3
2	Southern Arkansas	0

Finals
1	Harding	3
3	Arkansas Tech	1

- All-Tournament Team

Mollie Arnold, Harding (Most Valuable Player)
Amber Schinzing, Harding
Bailee Graham, Harding
Amber Cerrillos, Arkansas Tech
Morgan McKellar, Arkansas Tech
Lindsay Dusin, Southwestern Oklahoma State
Denise De Vine, Southern Arkansas
