= 2021 California Vulcans football team =

American college football season

2021 California Vulcans football

PSAC West Division co-champion
- Conference: Pennsylvania State Athletic Conference
- West Division

Ranking
- AFCA: No. 21
- Record: 9–1 (8–1 PSAC)
- Head coach: Gary Dunn (6th season)
- Offensive coordinator: Chad Salisbury (13th season)
- Home stadium: Hepner–Bailey Field at Adamson Stadium

2021 Pennsylvania State Athletic Conference football standings
| | Conf. | | | Overall |
| Team | W | | L | W | | L |
|---|---|---|---|---|---|---|
East Division
| No. 8 Kutztown xy$^ | 7 | – | 0 | 11 | – | 2 |
| No. 5 Shepherd x^ | 6 | – | 1 | 13 | – | 2 |
| Shippensburg | 5 | – | 2 | 9 | – | 2 |
| West Chester | 4 | – | 3 | 6 | – | 5 |
| East Stroudsburg | 3 | – | 4 | 5 | – | 6 |
| Bloomsburg | 2 | – | 5 | 3 | – | 8 |
| Millersville | 1 | – | 6 | 2 | – | 9 |
| Lock Haven | 0 | – | 7 | 1 | – | 10 |
West Division
| No. 20 Slippery Rock xy^ | 6 | – | 1 | 9 | – | 3 |
| No. 21 California (PA) x | 5 | – | 1 | 9 | – | 1 |
| IUP | 5 | – | 2 | 7 | – | 3 |
| Gannon | 3 | – | 4 | 5 | – | 6 |
| Edinboro | 3 | – | 4 | 4 | – | 6 |
| Mercyhurst | 3 | – | 4 | 4 | – | 7 |
| Seton Hill | 2 | – | 5 | 5 | – | 6 |
| Clarion | 0 | – | 6 | 0 | – | 10 |
Championship: Kutztown 38, Slippery Rock 32
$ – Conference champion; x – Division champion/co-champions; y – Championship game participant; ^ – NCAA Division II playoff participant; Rankings from AFCA poll

The 2021 California Vulcans football team represented California University of Pennsylvania as a member of the West Division of the Pennsylvania State Athletic Conference (PSAC) during the 2021 NCAA Division II football season. Led by sixth-year head coach Gary Dunn, California compiled an overall record of 9–1 with a mark of 5–1 in conference play, sharing PSAC West Division title with Slippery Rock, who dealt the Vulcans their only loss of the season. By virtue of the head-to-head win Slippery Rock earned a berth in the PSAC Football Championship Game. California was ranked No. 21 in the final AFCA poll, but was not selected for the NCAA Division II Football Championship playoffs. The Vulcans played their home games at Hepner–Bailey Field at Adamson Stadium in California, Pennsylvania.

Due the COVID-19 pandemic, all PSAC teams cancelled play in 2020.

== Schedule ==
| Date | Time | Opponent | Rank | Site | TV | Result | Attendance | Source |
|---|---|---|---|---|---|---|---|---|
| September 2 | 7:00 p.m. | at Fairmont State* | | Duvall-Rosier Field; Fairmont, WV | | W 23–14 | 2,132 | |
| September 11 | 1:00 p.m. | Lock Haven* | | Hepner–Bailey Field at Adamson Stadium; California, PA | | W 59–0 | 2,612 | |
| September 18 | 1:00 p.m. | Millersville* | | Hepner–Bailey Field at Adamson Stadium; California, PA | | W 30–0 | 1,629 | |
| September 25 | 12:00 p.m. | at Edinboro | | Sox Harrison Stadium; Edinboro, PA | | W 20–12 | 1,893 | |
| October 2 | 3:00 p.m. | Mercyhurst^{†} | No. 25 | Hepner–Bailey Field at Adamson Stadium; California, PA | | W 37–0 | 4,369 | |
| October 9 | 12:00 p.m. | at Gannon | No. 15 | McConnell Family Stadium; Erie, PA | | W 38–17 | 523 | |
| October 16 | 4:00 p.m. | Clarion | No. 13 | Hepner–Bailey Field at Adamson Stadium; California, PA | | No contest | | |
| October 23 | 2:00 p.m. | at No. 23 IUP | No. 5 | Miller Stadium; Indiana, PA (Coal Bowl) | ESPNU | W 38–34 | 4,821 | |
| October 30 | 4:00 p.m. | Seton Hill | No. 4 | Hepner–Bailey Field at Adamson Stadium; California, PA (Senior Day) | | W 42–14 | 2,128 | |
| November 6 | 1:00 p.m. | at No. 15 Slippery Rock | No. 3 | N. Kerr Thompson Stadium; Slippery Rock, PA | | L 26–38 | 7,191 | |
| November 13 | 12:00 p.m. | at Bloomsburg* | No. 15 | Robert B. Redman Stadium; Bloomsburg, PA | | W 24–9 | 1,486 | |
*Non-conference game; ^{†}Homecoming; Rankings from AFCA Poll released prior to the game; All times are in Eastern time
