= 2021 Kutztown Golden Bears football team =

American college football season

2021 Kutztown Golden Bears football

PSAC champion PSAC East champion

PSAC Championship Game, W 38–32 vs. Slippery Rock

NCAA Division II quarterfinal, L 30–28 vs. Shepherd
- Conference: Pennsylvania State Athletic Conference
- East Division

Ranking
- AFCA: No. 8
- Record: 11–2 (8–1 PSAC)
- Head coach: Jim Clements (7th season)
- Home stadium: Andre Reed Stadium

2021 Pennsylvania State Athletic Conference football standings
	Conf.			Overall
Team	W		L	W		L
East Division
No. 8 Kutztown xy$^	7	–	0	11	–	2
No. 5 Shepherd x^	6	–	1	13	–	2
Shippensburg	5	–	2	9	–	2
West Chester	4	–	3	6	–	5
East Stroudsburg	3	–	4	5	–	6
Bloomsburg	2	–	5	3	–	8
Millersville	1	–	6	2	–	9
Lock Haven	0	–	7	1	–	10
West Division
No. 20 Slippery Rock xy^	6	–	1	9	–	3
No. 21 California (PA) x	5	–	1	9	–	1
IUP	5	–	2	7	–	3
Gannon	3	–	4	5	–	6
Edinboro	3	–	4	4	–	6
Mercyhurst	3	–	4	4	–	7
Seton Hill	2	–	5	5	–	6
Clarion	0	–	6	0	–	10
Championship: Kutztown 38, Slippery Rock 32
$ – Conference champion; x – Division champion/co-champions; y – Championship game participant; ^ – NCAA Division II playoff participant; Rankings from AFCA poll

The 2021 Kutztown Golden Bears football team represented Kutztown University of Pennsylvania during the 2021 NCAA Division II football season.

== Schedule ==
Date	Time	Opponent	Rank	Site	TV	Result	Attendance
September 4	12:05 p.m.	Assumption*	No. 20	Andre Reed Stadium; Kutztown, PA	KUTV	W 19–0	3,950
September 11	2:00 p.m.	at No. 15 IUP	No. 18	Miller Stadium; Indiana, PA	PSAC Network	L 26–29	5,000
September 18	12:05 p.m.	Seton Hill		Andre Reed Stadium; Kutztown, PA		W 14–3	3,818
September 25	12:00 p.m.	at No. 10 Shepherd		Ram Stadium; Shepherdstown, WV		W 37–29	5,371
October 2	12:05 p.m.	East Stroudsburg		Andre Reed Stadium; Kutztown, PA		W 21–14	3,137
October 9	2:00 p.m.	at Bloomsburg		Robert B. Redman Stadium; Bloomsburg, PA		W 34–7	3,282
October 16	5:05 p.m.	Shippensburg	No. 25	Andre Reed Stadium; Kutztown, PA		W 20–3	2,024
October 23	2:00 p.m.	at Lock Haven	No. 25	Hubert Jack Stadium; Lock Haven, PA		W 32–15	826
October 30	2:05 p.m.	Millersville	No. 21	Andre Reed Stadium; Kutztown, PA		W 30–17	4,125
November 6	2:00 p.m.	at West Chester	No. 19	John A. Farrell Stadium; West Chester, PA	PSAC Network	W 21–14	2,733
November 13	12:05 p.m.	No. 10 Slippery Rock	No. 16	Andre Reed Stadium; Kutztown, PA (PSAC Football Championship Game)		W 38–32	3,352
November 27	12:05 p.m.	No. 18 New Haven*	No. 12	Andre Reed Stadium; Kutztown, PA (NCAA Division II second round)		W 10–7	1,839
December 4	12:05 p.m.	No. 8 Shepherd*	No. 12	Andre Reed Stadium; Kutztown, PA (NCAA Division II quarterfinal)		L 28–30	3,393
*Non-conference game; Rankings from AFCA Poll released prior to the game; All times are in Eastern time

== Game summaries ==
=== vs. Assumption ===
Game Summary
	Q1	Q2	Q3	Q4	Final
No. 20 Kutztown	0	9	7	3	19
Assumption	0	0	0	0	0
First quarter: no scoring; Second quarter: 9:56 – KUTZ – Dean Krcic 21 yd field goal (15 plays, 85 yards); 0:27 – KUTZ – Mason McElroy 7 yd touchdown pass from Eric Nickel (11 plays, 67 yards); Third quarter: 3:38 – KUTZ – Jerome Kapp 15 yd touchdown pass from Donnie Blaine, Dean Kricic kick (8 plays, 68 yards); Fourth quarter: 7:28 – KUTZ – Dean Krcic 33 yd field goal (16 plays, 78 yards)

=== at No. 15 IUP ===
Game Summary
	Q1	Q2	Q3	Q4	Final
No. 15 IUP	0	7	0	22	29
No. 18 Kutztown	7	0	6	13	26
First quarter: 6:02 – KUTZ – Jordan Davis 11 yd touchdown run, Dean Kricic kick (5 plays, 86 yards); Second quarter: 11:34 – IUP – Irvin Charles 3 yd touchdown pass from Javon Davis, Tyler Luther kick (15 plays, 75 yards); Third quarter: 5:10 – KUTZ – Jeremiah Nelson 5 yd touchdown pass from Donnie Blaine (10 plays, 80 yards); Fourth quarter: 14:57 – IUP – Dayjure Stewart 3 yd touchdown run, Tyler Luther kick (11 plays, 73 yards); 12:28 – KUTZ – Jerome Kapp 49 yd touchdown pass from Donnie Blaine (4 plays, 69 yards); 8:09 – IUP – Duane Brown 3 yd touchdown pass from Javon Davis, two point successful (7 plays, 75 yards); 6:30 – IUP – Raunya Mitchell 26 yd interception return for touchdown, Tyler Luther kick (1 play, 26 yards); 3:45 – KUTZ – Jerome Kapp 22 yd touchdown pass from Eric Nickel, Dean Kricic kick (10 plays, 78 yards)
