= 2021 IUP Crimson Hawks football team =

American college football season

2021 IUP Crimson Hawks football
- Conference: Pennsylvania State Athletic Conference
- West Division
- Record: 7–3 (5–2 PSAC)
- Head coach: Paul Tortorella (5th season)
- Offensive coordinator: Tate Gregory (4th season)
- Defensive coordinator: Jim Smith (5th season)
- Home stadium: Miller Stadium

2021 Pennsylvania State Athletic Conference football standings
	Conf.			Overall
Team	W		L	W		L
East Division
No. 8 Kutztown xy$^	7	–	0	11	–	2
No. 5 Shepherd x^	6	–	1	13	–	2
Shippensburg	5	–	2	9	–	2
West Chester	4	–	3	6	–	5
East Stroudsburg	3	–	4	5	–	6
Bloomsburg	2	–	5	3	–	8
Millersville	1	–	6	2	–	9
Lock Haven	0	–	7	1	–	10
West Division
No. 20 Slippery Rock xy^	6	–	1	9	–	3
No. 21 California (PA) x	5	–	1	9	–	1
IUP	5	–	2	7	–	3
Gannon	3	–	4	5	–	6
Edinboro	3	–	4	4	–	6
Mercyhurst	3	–	4	4	–	7
Seton Hill	2	–	5	5	–	6
Clarion	0	–	6	0	–	10
Championship: Kutztown 38, Slippery Rock 32
$ – Conference champion; x – Division champion/co-champions; y – Championship game participant; ^ – NCAA Division II playoff participant; Rankings from AFCA poll

The 2021 IUP Crimson Hawks football team represented the Indiana University of Pennsylvania in the 2021 NCAA Division II football season as a member of the Pennsylvania State Athletic Conference (PSAC). Led by fifth-year head coach Paul Tortorella, the Crimson Hawks compiled an overall record of 7–3 and a mark of 5–2 in conference play, finishing third in the PSAC West Division.

== Schedule ==
Date	Time	Opponent	Rank	Site	TV	Result	Attendance	Source
September 11	2:00 p.m.	No. 18 Kutztown*	No. 15	Miller Stadium; Indiana, PA	PSAC Network	W 29–26	5,000	
September 18	2:00 p.m.	No. 11 Shepherd*	No. 14	Miller Stadium; Indiana, PA	PSAC Network	L 21–37	6,367	
September 25	12:00 p.m.	Mercyhurst	No. 24	Saxon Stadium; Erie, PA		W 48–13	1,078	
October 2	2:00 p.m.	Gannon^{†}	No. 25	Miller Stadium; Indiana, PA		W 28–23	5,392	
October 9	2:00 p.m.	Clarion		Memorial Stadium; Clarion, PA		W 58–21	999	
October 16	1:00 p.m.	No. 6 Slippery Rock		Mihalik-Thompson Stadium; Slippery Rock, PA		W 48–21	9,317	
October 23	2:00 p.m.	No. 5 California (PA)	No. 23	Miller Stadium; Indiana, PA		L 34–38	4,821	
October 30	2:00 p.m.	Edinboro		Miller Stadium; Indiana, PA		L 17–21	3,592	
November 6	2:00 p.m.	Seton Hill		Offutt Field; Greensburg, PA		W 38–3	1,000	
November 13	2:00 p.m.	West Chester*		John A. Farrell Stadium; West Chester, PA	ESPN3	W 31–24	3,234	
*Non-conference game; ^{†}Homecoming; Rankings from AFCA Poll released prior to the game; All times are in Eastern time

== Game summaries ==
=== Vs. Kutztown ===
In the first game of the season, the Crimson Hawks beat the number 18 ranked Kutztown Golden Bears by a score of 29–26. After going down early, they came back by scoring 22 points in the fourth quarter. Wide receiver Duane Brown caught 10 passes for 131 yards and quarterback Javon Davis completed 19 of 29 passes for 204 yards and two scores.

=== Vs. Shepherd ===
IUP lost in their second game of the season against the Shepherd Rams in week two, by a score of 21–37 in a game that saw the Crimson Hawks outgained 330 yards to 554. Quarterback Javon Davis completed 20-of-30 passes for 266 yards and three scores.

=== At Mercyhurst ===
On the road versus Mercyhurst, the Crimson Hawks won 48–13 in the IUP debut for former Division I quarterback Harry Woodbery. Woodbery, a transfer from Eastern Illinois, had missed the prior two games with COVID-19, but threw four touchdowns in his return. He was 15-of-22 passing for 146 yards, and also ran four another score.

=== Vs. Gannon ===
Despite blowing a 14–0 start, the Crimson Hawks came back and won in their homecoming game against Gannon on October 2.

=== At Clarion ===
Traveling to Clarion, Pennsylvania, to play the winless Clarion Golden Eagles, the Crimson Hawks dominated in a 58–21 win, scoring four touchdowns in the second quarter alone.

=== At Slippery Rock ===
The Crimson Hawks traveled to Slippery Rock for their sixth game of the year, and stunned the number six ranked team in a 48–21 victory for IUP. It was the only conference loss of the season for Slippery Rock, and snapped a 19-game conference winning streak. Harry Woodbery threw for 312 yards and five touchdowns for IUP.
