= 2025 Shepherd Rams football team =

American college football season

2025 Shepherd Rams football
- Conference: Pennsylvania State Athletic Conference
- East Division
- Record: 7–4 (6–1 PSAC)
- Head coach: Ernie McCook (8th season)
- Defensive coordinator: Josh Kline (16th season)
- Home stadium: Ram Stadium

2025 Pennsylvania State Athletic Conference football standings
	Conf.			Overall
Team	W		L	W		L
East Division
No. 3 Kutztown xy$^	7	–	0	14	–	1
Shepherd	6	–	1	7	–	4
East Stroudsburg	5	–	2	8	–	3
Lock Haven	4	–	3	6	–	5
Shippensburg	3	–	4	3	–	8
West Chester	2	–	5	4	–	7
Bloomsburg	1	–	6	3	–	8
Millersville	0	–	7	0	–	11
West Division
IUP xy^	5	–	1	7	–	4
Edinboro x	5	–	1	7	–	4
No. 22 California (PA) ^	3	–	3	9	–	4
Slippery Rock	3	–	3	6	–	4
Clarion	2	–	4	6	–	5
Seton Hill	2	–	4	4	–	7
Gannon	1	–	5	1	–	10
Championship: Kutztown 28, IUP 23
$ – Conference champion; x – Division champion/co-champions; y – Championship game participant; ^ – NCAA Division II playoff participant; Rankings from AFCA poll

The 2025 Shepherd Rams football team represented Shepherd University as a member of the East Division of the Pennsylvania State Athletic Conference (PSAC) during the 2025 NCAA Division II football season. Led by eighth-year head coach Ernie McCook.

== Schedule ==
Date	Time	Opponent	Site	Result	Attendance
August 30	6:00 p.m.	at Frostburg State*	Bobcat Stadium; Frostburg, MD	L 27–41	2,050
September 13	6:00 p.m.	at No. 4 Slippery Rock*	Mihalik-Thompson Stadium; Slippery Rock, PA	L 28–35 ^{OT}	8,112
September 20	1:00 p.m.	at Clarion*	Memorial Field; Clarion, PA	L 38–51	1,048
September 27	12:00 p.m.	Kutztown	Ram Stadium; Shepherdstown, WV	L 10–49	3,319
October 4	2:00 p.m.	at Millersville	Biemesderfer Stadium; Millersville, PA	W 38–23	3,302
October 11	12:00 p.m.	West Chester	Ram Stadium; Shepherdstown, WV	W 28–24	3,033
October 18	2:00 p.m.	at Bloomsburg	Robert B. Redman Stadium; Bloomsburg, PA	W 37–13	2,685
October 25	12:00 p.m.	East Stroudsburg^{†}	Ram Stadium; Shepherdstown, WV	W 26–23	5,409
November 1	12:00 p.m.	Shippensburg	Ram Stadium; Shepherdstown, WV	W 48–7	4,207
November 8	1:00 p.m.	at Lock Haven	Hubert Jack Stadium; Lock Haven, PA	W 35–19	1,014
November 15	12:00 p.m.	Seton Hill*	Ram Stadium; Shepherdstown, WV	W 21–13	3,607
*Non-conference game; ^{†}Homecoming; Rankings from AFCA Poll released prior to the game; All times are in Eastern time
