= 2021 Slippery Rock football team =

American college football season

2021 Slippery Rock football

NCAA Division II First Round, L 25–33 at Notre Dame (OH)
- Conference: Pennsylvania State Athletic Conference
- West Division

Ranking
- AFCA: No. 20
- Record: 9–3 (8–1 PSAC)
- Head coach: Shawn Lutz (6th season)
- Home stadium: N. Kerr Thompson Stadium

2021 Pennsylvania State Athletic Conference football standings
	Conf.			Overall
Team	W		L	W		L
East Division
No. 8 Kutztown xy$^	7	–	0	11	–	2
No. 5 Shepherd x^	6	–	1	13	–	2
Shippensburg	5	–	2	9	–	2
West Chester	4	–	3	6	–	5
East Stroudsburg	3	–	4	5	–	6
Bloomsburg	2	–	5	3	–	8
Millersville	1	–	6	2	–	9
Lock Haven	0	–	7	1	–	10
West Division
No. 20 Slippery Rock xy^	6	–	1	9	–	3
No. 21 California (PA) x	5	–	1	9	–	1
IUP	5	–	2	7	–	3
Gannon	3	–	4	5	–	6
Edinboro	3	–	4	4	–	6
Mercyhurst	3	–	4	4	–	7
Seton Hill	2	–	5	5	–	6
Clarion	0	–	6	0	–	10
Championship: Kutztown 38, Slippery Rock 32
$ – Conference champion; x – Division champion/co-champions; y – Championship game participant; ^ – NCAA Division II playoff participant; Rankings from AFCA poll

The 2021 Slippery Rock football team represented Slippery Rock University of Pennsylvania in the 2021 NCAA Division II football season. A member of the Pennsylvania State Athletic Conference they competed in the conference's West Division. The conference did not play football last fall due to the global COVID-19 pandemic. The team was coached by Shawn Lutz in his sixth season with the school.

== Schedule ==
Date	Time	Opponent	Rank	Site	Result	Attendance
September 2	6:00 p.m.	at Wayne State*	No. 5	Tom Adams Field; Detroit, MI	W 24–21	2,431
September 11	6:05 p.m.	East Stroudsburg	No. 8	N. Kerr Thompson Stadium; Slippery Rock, PA	W 22–7	8,101
September 18	6:00 p.m.	Lock Haven	No. 6	N. Kerr Thompson Stadium; Slippery Rock, PA	W 57–7	7,224
September 25	6:00 p.m.	at Seton Hill	No. 6	Offutt Field; Greensburg, PA	W 41–17	1,150
October 2	6:00 p.m.	Clarion	No. 7	N. Kerr Thompson Stadium; Slipper Rock, PA	W 75–0	5,003
October 9	2:00 p.m.	at Edinboro	No. 6	Sox Harrison Stadium; Edinboro, PA	W 49–13	5,850
October 16	1:00 p.m.	IUP	No. 6	N. Kerr Thompson Stadium; Slippery Rock, PA	L 21–48	9,317
October 23	12:00 p.m.	at Mercyhurst	No. 17	Saxon Stadium; Erie, PA	W 20–17	1,320
October 30	12:00 p.m.	at Gannon	No. 15	McConnell Family Stadium; Erie, PA	W 63–21	556
November 6	1:00 p.m.	California (PA)	No. 15	N. Kerr Thompson Stadium; Slippery Rock, PA (Senior Day)	W 38–26	7,191
November 13	12:05 p.m.	at Kutztown*	No. 10	Andre Reed Stadium; Kutztown, PA (PSAC Football Championship Game)	L 32–38	3,352
November 20	12:00 p.m.	at Notre Dame (OH)*	No. 10	Mueller Field; South Euclid, OH (NCAA Division II first round)	L 25–33	1,755
*Non-conference game; Rankings from AFCA Poll released prior to the game; All times are in Eastern time

== Rankings ==
Ranking movements Legend: ██ Increase in ranking ██ Decrease in ranking
	Week											
Poll	Pre	1	2	3	4	5	6	7	8	9	10	Final
AFCA DII	5	8	6	6	7	6	6	17	15	15	10	20
D2Football.com	9	10	7	6	6	7	7	16	16	12	18	22
