= 2021 Shepherd Rams football team =

American college football season

2021 Shepherd Rams football

NCAA Division II Semifinal, L 7–55 at Ferris State
- Conference: Pennsylvania State Athletic Conference
- East Division

Ranking
- AFCA: No. 5
- Record: 13–2 (6–1 PSAC)
- Head coach: Ernie McCook (4th season)
- Offensive coordinator: Jesse Correll (1st season)
- Defensive coordinator: Josh Kline (13th season)
- Home stadium: Ram Stadium

2021 Pennsylvania State Athletic Conference football standings
	Conf.			Overall
Team	W		L	W		L
East Division
No. 8 Kutztown xy$^	7	–	0	11	–	2
No. 5 Shepherd x^	6	–	1	13	–	2
Shippensburg	5	–	2	9	–	2
West Chester	4	–	3	6	–	5
East Stroudsburg	3	–	4	5	–	6
Bloomsburg	2	–	5	3	–	8
Millersville	1	–	6	2	–	9
Lock Haven	0	–	7	1	–	10
West Division
No. 20 Slippery Rock xy^	6	–	1	9	–	3
No. 21 California (PA) x	5	–	1	9	–	1
IUP	5	–	2	7	–	3
Gannon	3	–	4	5	–	6
Edinboro	3	–	4	4	–	6
Mercyhurst	3	–	4	4	–	7
Seton Hill	2	–	5	5	–	6
Clarion	0	–	6	0	–	10
Championship: Kutztown 38, Slippery Rock 32
$ – Conference champion; x – Division champion/co-champions; y – Championship game participant; ^ – NCAA Division II playoff participant; Rankings from AFCA poll

The 2021 Shepherd Rams football team represented Shepherd University during the 2021 NCAA Division II football season. The 2021 season was the second for the Rams as a member of the Pennsylvania State Athletic Conference after joining the conference in 2019. Due to the COVID-19 pandemic, the 2020 season was canceled. The team was led by 4th year head coach Ernie McCook, and played their home games at Ram Stadium in Shepherdstown, WV.

On December 17, Junior QB Tyson Bagent won the Harlon Hill Trophy, as most valuable player in NCAA Division II for the 2021 season.

== Playoffs ==
Shepherd advanced to the NCAA Division II Football Championship as the #2 seed in Super Region 1. In the first round, they hosted Findlay, winning 38–31.

In the second round against Notre Dame (OH), the Rams won 38–34, on a Tyson Bagent 23 yard touchdown pass with two seconds remaining.

In the quarterfinal round against Kutztown, Bagent threw a 42 yard touchdown pass as time expired, resulting in a 30–28 win for Shepherd.

Shepherd went on to lose in the semi-finals, 7–55, against Ferris State.

== Schedule ==
Date	Time	Opponent	Rank	Site	TV	Result	Attendance	Source
September 2	7:00 p.m.	at Ohio Dominican*	No. 15	Panther Stadium; Columbus, OH		W 35–30	918	
September 11	12:00 p.m.	at Gannon*	No. 13	McConnell Family Stadium; Erie, PA		W 56–26	1,137	
September 18	2:00 p.m.	at No. 14 IUP*	No. 11	Miller Stadium; Indiana, PA		W 37–21	6,367	
September 25	12:00 p.m.	Kutztown	No. 10	Ram Stadium; Shepherdstown, WV		L 29–37	5,371	
October 2	12:00 p.m.	Shippensburg	No. 21	Ram Stadium; Shepherdstown, WV		W 59–27	5,291	
October 9	1:00 p.m.	at Lock Haven	No. T–16	Hubert Jack Stadium; Lock Haven, PA		W 75–21	723	
October 16	2:00 p.m.	at Millersville	No. 15	Biemesderfer Stadium; Millersville, PA		W 38–13	2,210	
October 23	12:00 p.m.	West Chester^{†}	No. 11	Ram Stadium; Shepherdstown, WV		W 42–38	5,911	
October 30	2:00 p.m.	at Bloomsburg	No. 12	Robert B. Redman Stadium; Bloomsburg, PA		W 62–18	2,124	
November 6	12:00 p.m.	East Stroudsburg	No. 11	Ram Stadium; Shepherdstown, WV		W 55–7	4,261	
November 13	12:00 p.m.	Clarion*	No. 8	Ram Stadium; Shepherdstown, WV (Senior Day)		W 55–0	4,259	
November 20	12:00 p.m.	Findlay*	No. 8	Ram Stadium; Shepherdstown, WV (NCAA Division II First Round)		W 38–31	4,503	
November 27	12:00 p.m.	No. 6 Notre Dame (OH)*	No. 8	Ram Stadium; Shepherdstown, WV (NCAA Division II Second Round)		W 38–34	4,857	
December 4	12:05 p.m.	at No. 12 Kutztown*	No. 8	Andre Reed Stadium; Kutztown, PA (NCAA Division II Quarterfinal)	PSAC TV	W 30–28	3,393	
December 11	3:30 p.m.	at No. 1 Ferris State*	No. 8	Top Taggart Field; Big Rapids, MI (NCAA Division II Semifinal)	ESPN+	L 7–55	2,473	
*Non-conference game; ^{†}Homecoming; Rankings from AFCA Poll released prior to the game; All times are in Eastern time

== Rankings ==
Ranking movements Legend: ██ Increase in ranking ██ Decrease in ranking т = Tied with team above or below
	Week											
Poll	Pre	1	2	3	4	5	6	7	8	9	10	Final
AFCA DII	15	13	11	10	21	16-T	15	11	12	11	8	5
D2Football.com	19	14	11	10	22							
