= George B. Ely =

American football, basketball and baseball coach

Biographical details
- Education: Kutztown

Coaching career (HC unless noted)

Football
- 1905: Kutztown

Basketball
- 1905: Kutztown

Baseball
- 1906–1908: Kutztown
- 1910: Shippensburg

Administrative career (AD unless noted)
- 1905–1908: Kutztown

Head coaching record
- Overall: 6–3 (football); 34–7–1 (baseball)

Accomplishments and honors

Awards
- Kutztown Hall of Fame (2001)

George B. Ely was an American football, basketball and baseball coach. He was the head football coach at Kutztown University of Pennsylvania for one season in 1905 before the school disbanded the sport until 1923.

Ely served for head baseball coach from 1906 to 1908 and the head men's basketball coach for one season in 1906 at Kutztown.

After leaving Kutztown, Ely served as the baseball coach for one year at Shippensburg University of Pennsylvania in 1910, leading the team to an 11–3 record.

== Head coaching record ==
=== Football ===
Year	Team	Overall	Conference	Standing	Bowl/playoffs
Kutztown (Independent) (1905)
1905	Kutztown	6–3			
Kutztown:		6–3			
Total:		6–3			
