= Duke Greco =

American football coach and player (born c. 1978)

Current position
- Title: Head coach
- Team: West Chester
- Conference: PSAC
- Record: 8–13

Biographical details
- Born: c. 1978 (age 47–48)

Playing career
- ?–2001: Delaware Valley
- Positions: Defensive back, quarterback

Coaching career (HC unless noted)
- 2002–2005: Delaware Valley (assistant)
- 2006–2013: Delaware Valley (AHC/OC)
- 2014–2023: Delaware Valley
- 2024–present: West Chester

Head coaching record
- Overall: 99–28
- Bowls: 2–0
- Tournaments: 7–7 (NCAA D-III playoffs)

Accomplishments and honors

Championships
- 6 MAC (2017–2019, 2021–2023)

Charles "Duke" Greco (born c. 1978) is an American college football coach and former player. He is the head football coach for West Chester University, a position he has held since 2024. He was the head football coach at Delaware Valley University from 2014 to 2023. Greco played college football at Delaware Valley, first as a defensive back and then as a quarterback. He threw for 3,974 yards and 45 touchdowns during his career as a player at Delaware Valley. Greco served as assistant head coach and offensive coordinator for the Aggies for eights years, from 2006 to 2013, under Jim Clements before succeeding him as head coach when Clements left to become the head football coach at Kutztown University of Pennsylvania. Greco left Delaware Valley University after the 2023 season to become the head coach at West Chester University, effective January 22, 2024.

== Early life and education ==
Greco attended Lower Moreland High School in Huntingdon Valley, Pennsylvania.

He graduated from Delaware Valley University in 2003 with a Bachelor of Arts degree in Sports Management.

== Playing career ==
Greco attended Lower Moreland High School in Huntingdon Valley, Pennsylvania, where he played football as a quarterback under head coach Mark Mayson.

Greco played college football at Delaware Valley University, first as a defensive back and then as a quarterback. He threw for 3,974 yards and 45 touchdowns during his career as a player at Delaware Valley.

== Coaching career ==
=== Delaware Valley ===
Greco was an assistant for the Delaware Valley Aggies from 2002 to 2005. He then served as assistant head coach and offensive coordinator for the Aggies for eights years, from 2006 to 2013, under Jim Clements before succeeding him as head coach when Clements left to become the head football coach at Kutztown University of Pennsylvania.

In 10 seasons as the head coach at Delaware Valley, Greco's overall record was 91–15. He earned a postseason appearance in all 10 seasons, including 6 NCAA Div III tournament appearances, 3 NCAA Div III tournament quarterfinal appearances, 6 consecutive Middle Atlantic Conference (MAC) championships, 2 Centennial-MAC Bowl Series championships, and 4 MAC Coach of the Year awards. He leaves the Aggies with a streak of 53 consecutive wins over MAC opponents, dating back to the 2016 season; it is the longest such streak in the 70-year history of the conference. In his final season with Delaware Valley, five of his players were named D3football.com All-Region 1.

=== West Chester ===
Greco left Delaware Valley University after the 2023 season to become the head coach at West Chester University, effective January 22, 2024. He is the Golden Rams' 17th all-time football coach, though only the third in the last 35 years.

== Head coaching record ==
Year	Team	Overall	Conference	Standing	Bowl/playoffs	D3^{#}
Delaware Valley Aggies (Middle Atlantic Conference) (2014–2023)
2014	Delaware Valley	9–2	8–1	2nd	L NCAA Division III First Round	25
2015	Delaware Valley	9–2	7–2	T–2nd	W Centennial-MAC Bowl	
2016	Delaware Valley	9–2	7–2	T–2nd	W Centennial-MAC Bowl	
2017	Delaware Valley	12–1	9–0	1st	L NCAA Division III Quarterfinal	7
2018	Delaware Valley	9–2	8–0	1st	L NCAA Division III First Round	16
2019	Delaware Valley	11–2	8–0	1st	L NCAA Division III Quarterfinal	8
2020–21	No team—COVID-19					
2021	Delaware Valley	11–1	8–0	1st	L NCAA Division III Second Round	11
2022	Delaware Valley	12–1	8–0	1st	L NCAA Division III Quarterfinal	
2023	Delaware Valley	9–2	9–0	1st	L NCAA Division III First Round	25
Delaware Valley:		91–15	72–5			
West Chester Golden Rams (Pennsylvania State Athletic Conference) (2024–present)
2024	West Chester	4–6	4–3	T–3rd (East)		
2025	West Chester	4–7	2–5	6th (East)		
West Chester:		8–13	6–8			
Total:		99–28				
National championship Conference title Conference division title or championship game berth
