= Paul Tortorella =

American football coach (born c. 1963)

Current position
- Title: Head coach
- Team: IUP
- Conference: PSAC
- Record: 67–23

Biographical details
- Born: c. 1963 (age 62–63); Mt. Lebanon, Pennsylvania, U.S.
- Education: Slippery Rock University (1985)

Coaching career (HC unless noted)
- 1985: Mt. Lebanon HS (PA) (LB)
- 1986–1987: Maryland (GA)
- 1988: Maryland (S)
- 1989: Maryland (ST/TE)
- 1990–1991: Maryland (ST/TE/RB)
- 1992–1994: Akron (DB)
- 1995–2010: IUP (DC)
- 2011–2016: IUP (AHC/DC)
- 2017–present: IUP

Head coaching record
- Overall: 67–23
- Tournaments: 3–4 (NCAA D-II playoffs)

Accomplishments and honors

Championships
- 2 PSAC (2017, 2022); 3 PSAC West Division (2017, 2022, 2025)

Paul Tortorella (born c. 1962) is an American college football coach. He is the head football coach for Indiana University of Pennsylvania, a position he has held since 2017. He also coached for Mt. Lebanon High School, Maryland, and Akron.

== Head coaching record ==
Year	Team	Overall	Conference	Standing	Bowl/playoffs	AFCA^{#}
IUP Crimson Hawks (Pennsylvania State Athletic Conference) (2017–present)
2017	IUP	13–1	7–0	1st (West)	L NCAA Division II Semifinal	3
2018	IUP	8–3	5–2	T–2nd (West)		
2019	IUP	10–2	6–1	2nd (West)	L NCAA Division II First Round	21
2020–21	No team—COVID-19					
2021	IUP	7–3	5–2	3rd (West)		
2022	IUP	10–2	6–1	T–1st (West)	L NCAA Division II Quarterfinal	11
2023	IUP	6–5	3–4	5th (West)		
2024	IUP	7–3	3–3	T–3rd (West)		
2025	IUP	7–4	5–1	1st (West)	L NCAA Division II First Round	
IUP:		68–23	40–14			
Total:		68–23				
National championship Conference title Conference division title or championship game berth
