= Golden Bears =

Golden Bears may refer to:

- Alberta Golden Bears
- California Golden Bears
- Kutztown Golden Bears
- Golden Bears (cheerleading)
