= Shawn Lutz =

American football coach (born c. 1973)

Current position
- Title: Head coach
- Team: Slippery Rock
- Conference: PSAC
- Record: 88–25

Biographical details
- Born: c. 1973 (age 52–53); Massillon, Ohio, U.S.
- Education: West Virginia University (1996); Slippery Rock University (2003)

Playing career
- 1992–1995: West Virginia
- Position: Tight end

Coaching career (HC unless noted)
- 1996–1997: Slippery Rock (GA)
- 1998: Slippery Rock (TE/OT)
- 1999–2005: Slippery Rock (DL)
- 2006–2012: Slippery Rock (DC/DL)
- 2013–2015: Slippery Rock (AHC/DC)
- 2016–present: Slippery Rock

Head coaching record
- Overall: 88–25
- Tournaments: 10–6 (NCAA D-II playoffs)

Accomplishments and honors

Championships
- 1 PSAC (2019); 5 PSAC West Division (2018–2019, 2021–2023)

Shawn Lutz (born c. 1973) is an American college football coach. He is the head football coach for Slippery Rock University, a position he has held since 2016. He was previously an assistant coach for Slippery Rock for twenty seasons. He played college football for West Virginia as a tight end.

== Head coaching record ==
Year	Team	Overall	Conference	Standing	Bowl/playoffs	AFCA^{#}	D2^{°}
Slippery Rock (Pennsylvania State Athletic Conference) (2016–present)
2016	Slippery Rock	7–4	3–4	T–4th (Western)			
2017	Slippery Rock	8–3	5–2	T–2nd (Western)			
2018	Slippery Rock	11–3	7–0	1st (West)	L NCAA Division II Quarterfinal	12	
2019	Slippery Rock	13–1	7–0	1st (West)	L NCAA Division II Semifinal	6	
2020–21	No team—COVID-19						
2021	Slippery Rock	9–3	6–1	1st (West)	L NCAA Division II First Round	20	
2022	Slippery Rock	10–3	6–1	T–1st (West)	L NCAA Division II Second Round	16	
2023	Slippery Rock	12–2	7–0	1st (West)	L NCAA Division II Quarterfinal	10	11
2024	Slippery Rock	12–2	5–1	2nd (West)	L NCAA Division II Semifinal	3	3
2025	Slippery Rock	6–4	3–3	T–3rd (West)			
2026	Slippery Rock	0–0	0–0	(West)			
Slippery Rock:		88–25	49–12				
Total:		88–25					
National championship Conference title Conference division title or championship game berth
