= Lower Moreland Township School District =

School district in Pennsylvania, U.S.

Address
- 2551 Murray Avenue Huntingdon Valley, (Montgomery County), Pennsylvania, 19006; United States

District information
- Type: Public
- Grades: K-12
- Superintendent: Dr. Dennis Best
- Governing agency: Pennsylvania Department of Education
- Accreditation: Middle States Association of Colleges and Schools

Students and staff
- Enrollment: 2182
- Student–teacher ratio: 12:1
- Athletic conference: PIAA District I AA
- District mascot: Lion
- Colors: Blue & gold

Other information
- Website: lmtsd.org

The Lower Moreland Township School District is a public school district in Montgomery County, Pennsylvania. The school district serves the Township of Lower Moreland, a Philadelphia suburb of about 11,000 people. There are four schools: Pine Road Elementary School (K-3), Murray Avenue School (4-6), Lower Moreland Middle School (7-8), and Lower Moreland High School (9-12).

== Administration ==
- Superintendent: Dr. Dennis Best
- Assistant Superintendent: Dr. Julie Henrich
- Director of Special Education and Student Services: Frank Giordano
- Business Manager: Karen Ovington
- Director of Technology: Dr. Prakash Patel
- Director of Human Resources/Public Relations: Cheryl Galdo, Esq.
- Director of Teaching, Learning and Community Engagement: Scott Cole

== Lower Moreland High School ==
Principal: William Miles; Assistant Principals: Justin Thomas, Megan Zeh; Athletic Director: Robert Dominick.

- School mascot: Lion
- School rival: Various – Springfield Township, Holy Ghost Prep, New Hope-Solebury, Bristol

The Lower Moreland High School serves students in grades 9 through 12.

Lower Moreland High School THON is a non-profit organization where the students of Lower Moreland High School come together to raise money for the Four Diamonds Fund, a fund that sponsors families who have a child fighting cancer, so they never have to see a bill in the child's' medical treatment. The LMHS THON is a smaller version of the dance marathon at Penn State. Most of the money comes from students raising it or companies that have donated it. Lower Moreland High School THON started in 2008. THON lasts for 12 hours or more, (since it is consistently changing and improving) where the students constantly are standing and are kept occupied by games and competitions so that the time goes by quickly.

=== Music program ===
The Lower Moreland Music High School music program has various bands, orchestras, and choirs:

- Symphonic Band: consists of all band students in grade 10 through 12.
- Wind Ensemble: a tryout ensemble for LMHS
- Jazz Lab: an ensemble for jazz enthusiasts who are in the process of learning jazz techniques and styles before moving onto the Jazz Ensemble
- Jazz Ensemble: a tryout ensemble at LMHS for jazz enthusiasts

== Lower Moreland Middle School ==
Principal: Jennifer Dilks. Assistant Principal: Matt Heiland. LMMS serves students in grades 7 through 8.

== Murray Avenue School ==
Principal: Erin Stroup. Assistant Principal: Shaquina Spraggins. Murray Avenue School serves students in grades 4 through 6.

== Pine Road Elementary School ==
Principal: Kaitlyn McMullan. Assistant Principal: Nancy Bradley.

Pine Road Elementary School serves students in grades Kindergarten through 3.

== Notable alumni ==
- Valerie Plame, CIA operative
- Jill Kelley, Lebanese-American socialite
- Katie Walder is an American actress
- Rod J. Rosenstein, United States Deputy Attorney General
- Harry Elfont, writer and director.
- Dina Gusovsky, journalist and comedy writer
