= IUP Crimson Hawks football =

Indiana University of Pennsylvania football organization

2026 IUP Crimson Hawks football team
- First season: 1890; 136 years ago (Note: It may be inexact.)
- Head coach: Paul Tortorella; 7th season, 67–23 (.744)
- Location: Indiana, Pennsylvania
- Stadium: Miller Stadium (capacity: 6,500)
- NCAA division: Division II
- Conference: Pennsylvania State Athletic Conference
- Division: West
- Colors: Crimson and gray
- All-time record: 616–290–23 (.675)
- Bowl record: 18–18–0 (Note: Includes PSAC Championships from 1960–1987 and since 2008, a Boardwalk Bowl appearance in 1968, and Division II playoffs since 1987.) (.500)

Conference championships
- 1934, 1940, 1986, 1987, 2012, 2017, 2022 (Note: From 1988 to 2007, the PSAC did not hold a championship game and only named Division champions.)

Division championships
- 1964, 1965, 1985, 1986, 1987, 1990, 1991, 1992, 1993, 1994, 1996, 2000, 2001, 2002, 2003, 2004, 2006, 2012, 2015, 2017, 2022, 2025
- Consensus All-Americans: 97
- Rivalries: California (PA) (rivalry); Slippery Rock
- Website: iupathletics.com

The IUP Crimson Hawks football program represents Indiana University of Pennsylvania in college football at the NCAA Division II level. The Crimson Hawks play their home games at George P. Miller Stadium in Indiana, Pennsylvania.

The Crimson Hawks' current head coach is Paul Tortorella, who was named acting head coach for the 2017 season after Curt Cignetti resigned to take the head coach position at Elon University. Cignetti had been introduced as IUP's head coach on January 21, 2011, to replace Lou Tepper. Before coming to IUP, Cignetti served as an assistant at the Division I level for 28 years.

== History ==
While little information is available, the Indiana Normal School played organized football games as early as 1890, when the school tied 6–6 with the Greensburg Athletic Association. Early on the school played other institutions such as Washington & Jefferson, West Virginia University and Western University of Pennsylvania, club teams such as the Greensburg Athletic Association and the Latrobe Athletic Association, the first professional football team. From 1895 to 1903, the Normal School played Latrobe six times, being outscored a total of 201–0, but playing one 0–0 tie. In 1892 they played against the Allegheny Athletic Association at Exposition Park in Pittsburgh, losing 20–6.

John Brallier became the first professional football player in 1895 after playing at the Normal School for two years. Born in Cherry Tree, Pennsylvania, Brallier played on the West Indiana Public School team. He began attending the Normal School in 1893 at age 17 so that he could play on the team. That year, the team won three of their four games. The team included Alex Stewart, father of actor Jimmy Stewart. In 1894, the team played other colleges and teams with former college players, winning only two of five games. The Normal School played Washington & Jefferson, losing 28–0. In December, Washington & Jefferson coach E. Gard Edwards wrote to Brallier, impressed by his play, encouraging him to attend the university. Brallier agreed if all his expenses were paid, and left the Normal team after graduating from public school in the spring.

University records begin with the tenure of George Miller in 1927. That first season, the Indiana State College team played other regional schools such as California State Normal School and Saint Vincent College, as well as further opponents such as Muskingum College and Kent State Normal College. Miller served for 20 seasons. His teams were twice honored as the best of the Pennsylvania state normal schools by sportswriters, in 1934 and 1940.

The Pennsylvania State Athletic Conference (PSAC) was formed by the members of the state system in 1951. Under future College Football Hall of Fame member Chuck Klausing, the team made their first appearances in the PSAC Championship game as the best team in the West Division. They lost both of their first two appearances, in 1964 and 1965. In 1968, the team competed against Delaware in the Boardwalk Bowl, which served as the NCAA College Division's eastern championship.

Frank Cignetti took over in 1986, and won the PSAC Championships that year, and again in 1987. In 1987, IUP made their first NCAA playoff appearance. Playing the UCF Golden Nights in the Citrus Bowl, which is a DI bowl game, and lost. The same year, they were awarded their first of ten Lambert Cups as the best Division II team in the east, second only to Delaware's twelve wins. Under Cignetti, IUP made two appearances in the NCAA Division II Championship in 1990 and 1993, losing both. When Cignetti retired in 2005, his 15 postseason appearances were the most among Division II coaches, his 182 wins at IUP more than doubled the next closest coach (George Miller, 79), and his 199 wins total (including 17 at West Virginia) were second-best for active Division II coaches.

Lou Tepper, who had previously coached at Illinois and Edinboro, took over in 2006. He became IUP's third coach, behind Bill Neal and Cignetti, that had served under Dave Hart at Pittsburgh. In the first season under Tepper, the Crimson Hawks won the PSAC West. In his first three-season, Tepper compiled a 25–7 record with the Crimson Hawks, but was 11–11 in his final two season and was dismissed as head coach following the 2010 season.

On January 21, 2011, former Alabama wide receivers coach and recruiting coordinator and son of longtime IUP head coach Frank Cignetti, Curt Cignetti accepted the head coaching job to replace Tepper.

== Season records ==
Year	Coach	Overall	Conference	Standing	Bowl/playoffs	Highest^{#}	Final^{°}
1893		3–1					
1894		2–3					
George P. Miller (1927–1947)
1927	George Miller	4–4					
1928	George Miller	3–4					
1929	George Miller	4–3					
1930	George Miller	3–3–1					
1931	George Miller	4–2–2					
1932	George Miller	5–3					
1933	George Miller	4–2					
1934	George Miller	6–0					
1935	George Miller	5–3					
1936	George Miller	4–2–1					
1937	George Miller	6–1–1					
1938	George Miller	3–4					
1939	George Miller	4–2–2					
1940	George Miller	7–0–1					
1941	George Miller	4–2					
1942	George Miller	5–3					
1943	George Miller	No games					
1944	George Miller	played					
1945	George Miller	0–2					
1946	George Miller	5–3					
1947	George Miller	2–1–1					
George P. Miller:		78–44–9					
Regis "Peck" McKnight (1947–1948)
1947	Peck McKnight	1–1–1					
1948	Peck McKnight	1–7					
Peck McKnight:		2–8–1					
Sam Smith (PSAC) (1949–1961)
1949	Sam Smith	4–4–1					
1950	Sam Smith	4–4–1					
1951	Sam Smith	5–3–1	5–3–1				
1952	Sam Smith	4–4	1–4				
1953	Sam Smith	4–4	3–2				
1954	Sam Smith	5–3	3–2				
1955	Sam Smith	3–5	3–2				
1956	Sam Smith	5–4	4–1				
1957	Sam Smith	3–6	2–2				
1958	Sam Smith	5–3	4–1				
1959	Sam Smith	3–4–1	1–3–1				
1960	Sam Smith	2–4–2	1–3–2				
1961	Sam Smith	2–7	1–4				
Sam Smith:		49–55–6	28–27–4				
Chuck Mills (PSAC) (1962–1963)
1962	Chuck Mills	5–2–1	4–1–1				
1963	Chuck Mills	7–1–1	5–1				
Chuck Mills:		12–3–2	9–2–1				
Chuck Klausing (PSAC) (1964–1969)
1964	Chuck Klausing	8–2	6–0		L PSAC Championship		
1965	Chuck Klausing	7–3	5–1		L PSAC Championship		
Chuck Klausing (Independent) (1966–1969)
1966	Chuck Klausing	7–2	—				
1967	Chuck Klausing	8–1	—				
1968	Chuck Klausing	9–1	—		L Boardwalk Bowl		
1969	Chuck Klausing	8–1	—				
Chuck Klausing:		47–10	11–1				
Bill Neal (Independent) (1970–1973)
1970	Bill Neal	5–4	—				
1971	Bill Neal	7–2	—				
1972	Bill Neal	8–1	—				
1973	Bill Neal	4–5	—				
Bill Neal (PSAC) (1974–1978)
1974	Bill Neal	6–4	4–2				
1975	Bill Neal	8–1–1	4–1–1				
1976	Bill Neal	4–5	3–3				
1977	Bill Neal	4–4–1	2–3–1				
1978	Bill Neal	4–5–1	2–4				
Bill Neal:		50–31–3	15–13–2				
Owen Dougherty (PSAC) (1979–1981)
1979	Owen Dougherty	7–3	3–3				
1980	Owen Dougherty	6–3	3–3				
1981	Owen Dougherty	4–6	2–4				
Owen Dougherty:		17–13–0	8–10–0				
George Chaump (PSAC) (1982–1985)
1982	George Chaump	4–6	3–3				
1983	George Chaump	5–5	4–2				
1984	George Chaump	7–3	4–2			6	14
1985	George Chaump	8–2–1	6–0		L PSAC Championship	3	9
George Chaump:		24–16–1	17–7				
Frank Cignetti (PSAC) (1986–2005)
1986	Frank Cignetti	9–2	6–0		W PSAC Championship	9	14
1987	Frank Cignetti	10–2	6–0		W PSAC Championship; NCAA Division II playoffs	6	6
1988	Frank Cignetti	8–3	5–1		NCAA Division II playoffs	3	14
1989	Frank Cignetti	11–2	5–1		NCAA Division II playoffs	4	9
1990	Frank Cignetti	12–2	6–0		L NCAA Division II Championship	4	4
1991	Frank Cignetti	12–1	6–0		NCAA Division II playoffs	1	1
1992	Frank Cignetti	8–1–1	5–0–1			2	12
1993	Frank Cignetti	13–1	6–0		L NCAA Division II Championship	4	4
1994	Frank Cignetti	10–3	6–0		NCAA Division II playoffs	2	8
1995	Frank Cignetti	8–3	5–1			4	19
1996	Frank Cignetti	8–3	5–1		NCAA Division II playoffs	1	10
1997	Frank Cignetti	5–5	4–2			11	NR
1998	Frank Cignetti	10–2	5–1		NCAA Division II playoffs	2	8
1999	Frank Cignetti	9–4	5–1		NCAA Division II playoffs	10	19
2000	Frank Cignetti	8–3	5–1		NCAA Division II playoffs	5	16
2001	Frank Cignetti	8–2	6–0		NCAA Division II playoffs	2	8
2002	Frank Cignetti	11–2	6–0		NCAA Division II playoffs	6	8
2003	Frank Cignetti	10–1	5–1			4	9
2004	Frank Cignetti	7–3	5–1			9	20
2005	Frank Cignetti	5–5	4–2			NR	NR
Frank Cignetti:		182–50–1	106–13–1				
Lou Tepper (PSAC) (2006–2010)
2006	Lou Tepper	8–2	5–1			18	25
2007	Lou Tepper	9–3	5–1		NCAA Division II playoffs	18	18
2008	Lou Tepper	8–2	5–2			13	NR
2009	Lou Tepper	5–6	1–6			21	NR
2010	Lou Tepper	6–5	3–4			NR	NR
Lou Tepper:		35–18	19–14				
Curt Cignetti (PSAC) (2011–2016)
2011	Curt Cignetti	7–3	5–2	2nd		NR	NR
2012	Curt Cignetti	12–2	6–1	T-1st	W PSAC Championship; NCAA Division II playoffs	7	7
2013	Curt Cignetti	9–2	5–2	2nd		7	24
2014	Curt Cignetti	6–5	5–4	5th		20	NR
2015	Curt Cignetti	9–3	6–1	T-1st	NCAA Division II playoffs	19	19
2016	Curt Cignetti	10–2	6–1	2nd		6	12
Curt Cignetti:		53–17	33–11				
Paul Tortorella (PSAC) (2017–present)
2017	Paul Tortorella	13–1	7–0	1st	W PSAC Championship; NCAA Division II playoffs	3	3
2018	Paul Tortorella	8–3	5–2	T-2nd		2	23
2019	Paul Tortorella	10–2	6–1	2nd	NCAA Division II playoffs	16	21
2021	Paul Tortorella	7–3	5–2			14	NR
2022	Paul Tortorella	10–2	6–1	1st	W PSAC Championship; NCAA Division II playoffs	11	11
2023	Paul Tortorella	6–5	3–4	5th (West)		13	NR
2024	Paul Tortorella	7–3	3–3	T-3rd (West)		20	NR
2025	Paul Tortorella	7–4	5-1	T-1st (West)		NR	NR
2026	Paul Tortorella	6–5	3–4	T-4th (West)		NR	NR
Paul Tortorella:		74–28	43–18				
Total:		629–299–23 (since 1927)					
National championship Conference title Conference division title or championship game berth
^{#}Highest rank achieved.; ^{°}Final rank.; Since 2000, the final rankings were released following the playoffs.

- Beginning in 1934, a group of sportswriters recognized the best team amongst Pennsylvania's State Teachers Colleges. When the Pennsylvania State Athletic Conference was organized in 1951 a point system was used to determine the champion until 1960. In 1960, the conference champion was determined by a championship game between the top teams of the East and West Divisions. In 1987 the championship game was discontinued, and only division champions were recognized from 1988 until the championship was reinstated in 2008.
- References: Conference records and championships, season records, coaches records, and rankings.

== Postseason appearances ==
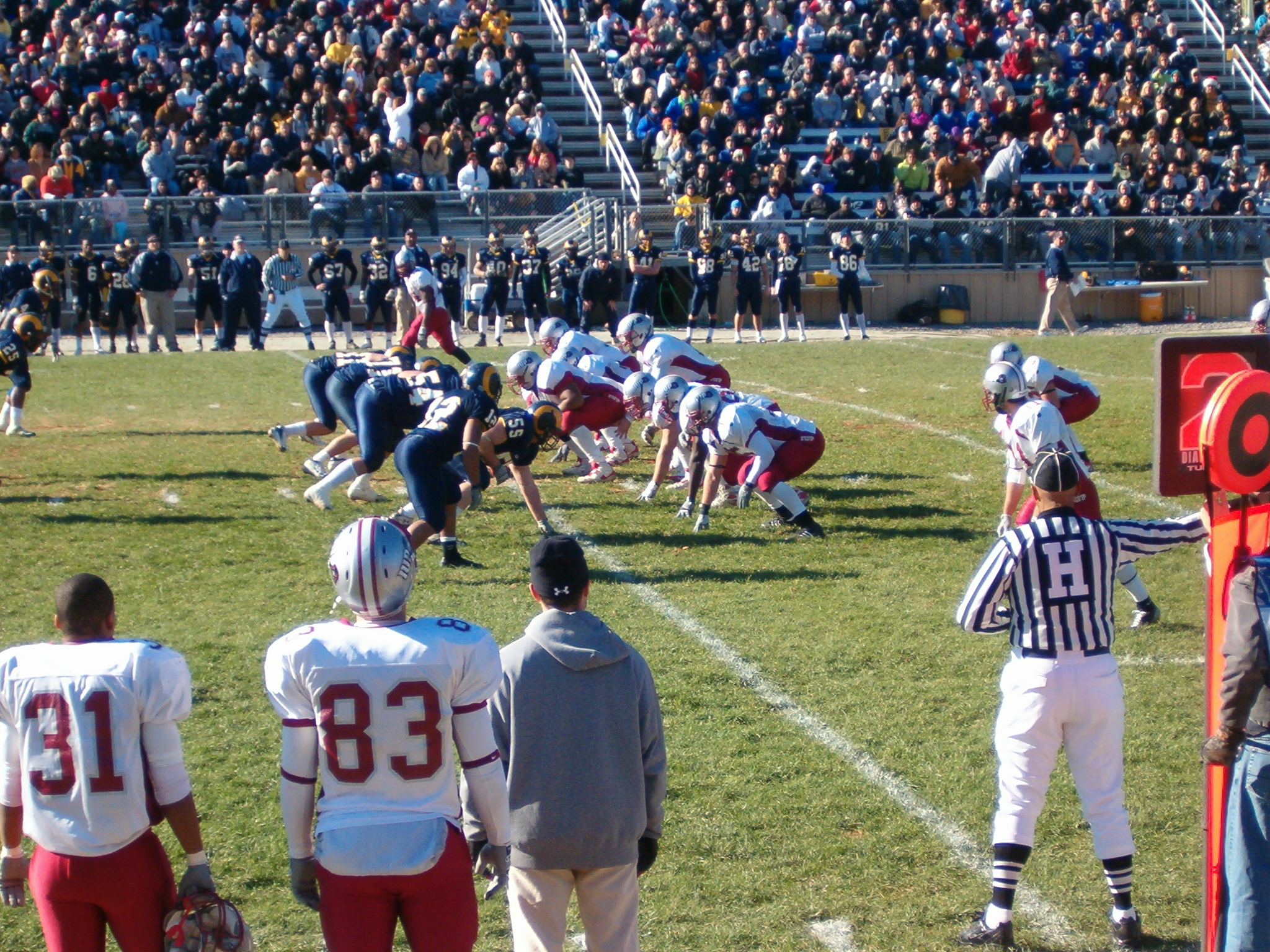
NCAA Division II playoff game at Shepherd in 2007

Date	Opponent	Site	TV	Result
1964	East Stroudsburg	(PSAC Championship)		L 14–27
1965	East Stroudsburg	(PSAC Championship)		L 10–26
1968	vs. Delaware	Atlantic City Convention Center; Atlantic City, New Jersey (Boardwalk Bowl)	ABC	L 24–31
1985	Bloomsburg	(PSAC Championship)		L 9–31
1986	West Chester	(PSAC Championship)		W 20–6
1987	West Chester	(PSAC Championship)		W 21–7
	at Central Florida	Citrus Bowl; Orlando, Florida (NCAA Division II quarterfinals)		L 10–12
1988	Millersville	Miller Stadium; Indiana, Pennsylvania (NCAA Division II first round)		L 24–27
1989	at Grand Valley State	Lubbers Stadium; Allendale, Michigan (NCAA Division II first round)		W 34–24
	at Portland State	Civic Stadium; Portland, Oregon (NCAA Division II quarterfinals)		W 17–0
	at Mississippi College	Robinson–Hale Stadium; Clinton, Mississippi (NCAA Division II semifinals)		L 14–26
1990	Winston-Salem State	Miller Stadium; Indiana, Pennsylvania (NCAA Division II first round)		W 48–0
	Edinboro	Miller Stadium; Indiana, Pennsylvania (NCAA Division II quarterfinals)		W 14–7
	at Mississippi College	Robinson–Hale Stadium; Clinton, Mississippi (NCAA Division II semifinals)		W 27–8
	vs. North Dakota State	Braly Municipal Stadium; Florence, Alabama (NCAA Division II Championship)	ESPN	L 11–51
1991	Virginia Union	Miller Stadium; Indiana, Pennsylvania (NCAA Division II first round)		W 56–7
	Shippensburg	Miller Stadium; Indiana, Pennsylvania (NCAA Division II quarterfinals)		W 52–7
	at Jacksonville State	Paul Snow Stadium; Jacksonville, Alabama (NCAA Division II semifinals)		L 20–27
1993	at Ferris State	Top Taggart Field; Big Rapids, Michigan (NCAA Division II first round)		W 28–21
	at New Haven	Robert B. Dodds Stadium; New Haven, Connecticut (NCAA Division II quarterfinals)		W 38–35
	North Dakota	Miller Stadium; Indiana, Pennsylvania (NCAA Division II semifinals)		W 21–6
	at North Alabama	Braly Municipal Stadium; Florence, Alabama (NCAA Division II Championship)	ESPN	L 34–41
1994	Grand Valley State	Miller Stadium; Indiana, Pennsylvania (NCAA Division II first round)		W 35–27
	at Ferris State	Big Rapids, Michigan (NCAA Division II quarterfinals)		W 21–17
	at Texas A&M–Kingsville	Javelina Stadium; Kingsville, Texas (NCAA Division II semifinals)		L 20–46
1996	at Ferris State	Top Taggart Field; Big Rapids, Michigan (NCAA Division II first round)		L 23–24
1998	Shepherd	Miller Stadium; Indiana, Pennsylvania (NCAA Division II first round)		L 6–9
1999	at Slippery Rock	N. Kerr Thompson Stadium; Slippery Rock, Pennsylvania (NCAA Division II first round)		W 27–20 ^{OT}
	at Millersville	Biemesderfer Stadium; Millersville, Pennsylvania (NCAA Division II quarterfinals)		W 26–21
	at Northwest Missouri State	Bearcat Stadium; Maryville, Missouri (NCAA Division II semifinals)		L 12–20
2000	at Northwood	Hantz Stadium; Midland, Michigan (NCAA Division II first round)		L 0–28
2001	at Saginaw Valley State	Wickes Memorial Stadium; University Center, Michigan (NCAA Division II first round)		L 32–33
2002	Saginaw Valley State	Miller Stadium; Indiana, Pennsylvania (NCAA Division II first round)		W 27–23
	at Grand Valley State	Lubbers Stadium; Allendale, Michigan (NCAA Division II quarterfinals)		L 21–62
2007	at West Chester	Farrell Stadium; West Chester, Pennsylvania (NCAA Division II first round)	WIUP-TV	W 45–35
	at Shepherd	Ram Stadium; Shepherdstown, West Virginia (NCAA Division II quarterfinals)	WIUP-TV	L 34–41
2012	Shippensburg	Miller Stadium; Indiana, Pennsylvania (PSAC Championship)	PCN	W 41–10
	Shepherd	Miller Stadium; Indiana, Pennsylvania (NCAA Division II first round)	IUP-TV	W 27–17
	at New Haven	Ralph F. DellaCamera Stadium; New Haven, Connecticut (NCAA Division II second round)		W 17–14
	at Winston-Salem State	Bowman Gray Stadium; Winston-Salem, North Carolina (NCAA Division II Quarterfinals)		L 17–21
2017	West Chester	John A. Farrell Stadium; West Chester, Pennsylvania (PSAC Championship)		W 24–7
	West Chester	Miller Stadium; Indiana, Pennsylvania (NCAA Division II second round)		W 44–10
	Assumption	Miller Stadium; Indiana, Pennsylvania (NCAA Division II quarterfinals)		W 27–22
	West Florida	Miller Stadium; Indiana, Pennsylvania (NCAA Division II semifinals)		L 17–27
2022	Shepherd	Miller Stadium; Indiana, Pennsylvania (PSAC Championship)		W 24–21
	Ashland	Miller Stadium; Indiana, Pennsylvania (NCAA Division II second round)		W 19–13
	Shepherd	Miller Stadium; Indiana, Pennsylvania (NCAA Division II quarterfinals)		L 13–48

== NFL draft picks ==
Through the 2010 NFL draft, seven Crimson Hawks players have been selected in the NFL draft. The first selected was Dave Smith in 1970 by the Pittsburgh Steelers, while the highest-selected thus far was Jim Haslett, by the Buffalo Bills in 1979.

== Undrafted free agents who played in the NFL ==
On June 20, 2024, Dondrea Tillman signed with the Denver Broncos. On August 27, he was waived by the Broncos. The next day, he was re-signed to the practice squad. On September 18, Tillman was promoted to the active roster after placing Mike McGlinchey on injured reserve. Tillman made his NFL debut in Week 3 of the 2024 season against the Tampa Bay Buccaneers. During the game, he recorded two sacks.
