= Kutztown Golden Bears men's basketball =

Kutztown Golden Bears Men's basketball
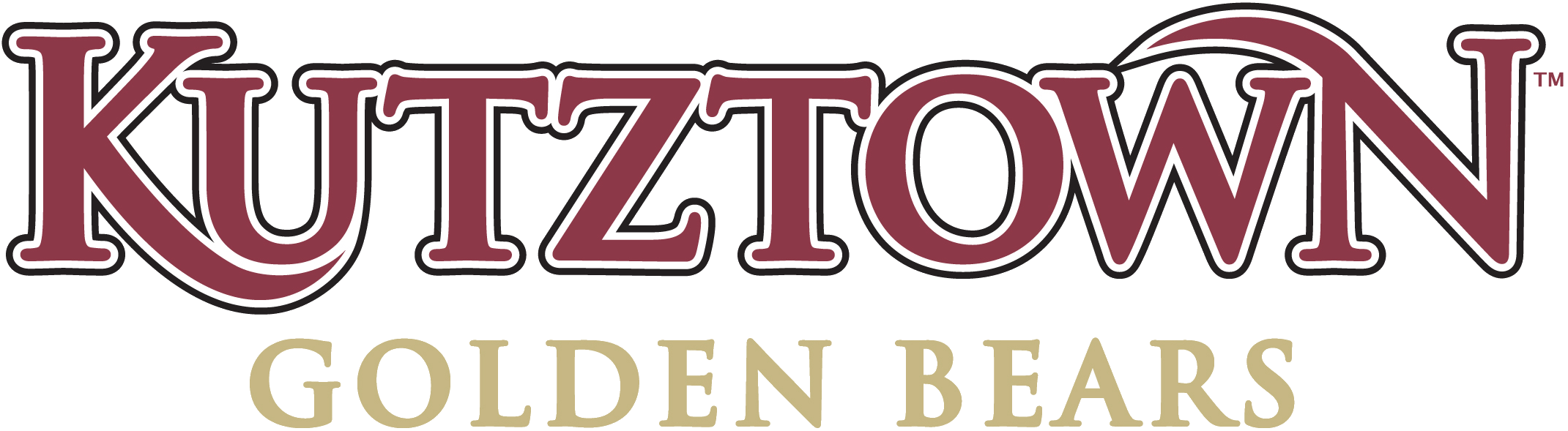
- University: Kutztown University of Pennsylvania
- All-time record: 1,302–471 (.734)
- Head coach: Bernie Driscoll (21st season)
- Conference: PSAC
- Location: Kutztown, Pennsylvania
- Nickname: Golden Bears
- Colors: Maroon and gold

NCAA tournament Elite Eight
- 2016, 2009

NCAA tournament appearances
- 2017, 2016, 2010, 2009; NCAA Division II

Conference regular-season champions
- 1991, 1999, 2001, 2011

Kutztown Golden Bears Men's basketball is a Division II basketball program who represents Kutztown University of Pennsylvania. They play all of their home games at Keystone Hall on campus. The basketball team was established in 1903. It is currently under the direction of head coach Bernie Driscoll, who has led the program since 2000. The team won the PSAC East regular-season title in 1988 and shared the division title in 2008. Since 2003, the team has posted five straight winning seasons and has an appearance in the PSAC title game (2004).

== Current roster ==
2021–22 Kutztown Golden Bears men's basketball team
Players
Coaches

Pos.	#	Name	Height	Weight	Year	Previous school	Hometown
G	3	Kyree Generett	6 ft 1 in (1.85 m)	180 lb (82 kg)	Sr	William Penn HS	York, PA
G	5	Jalen Bryant	5 ft 11 in (1.8 m)	165 lb (75 kg)	Fr	The John Carroll School	Edgewood, MD
G	10	Michael Smith III	6 ft 0 in (1.83 m)	180 lb (82 kg)	Jr	Chester HS	Chester, PA
G	11	Moe Williams	6 ft 8 in (2.03 m)	220 lb (100 kg)	GS	Life Center Academy	Townsend, DE
C	14	Channick Nkoma	6 ft 8 in (2.03 m)	235 lb (107 kg)	Jr	Harcum	Libreville, Gabon
G	20	Evan-Eric Longino	6 ft 6 in (1.98 m)	210 lb (95 kg)	GS	West Chester	Furlong, PA
G	22	Julian Boykins	6 ft 3 in (1.91 m)	200 lb (91 kg)	GS	Seton Hill	Randolph, NJ
G	23	Wesley Butler	6 ft 0 in (1.83 m)	180 lb (82 kg)	Jr	Reading HS	Reading, PA
G	24	John Proctor	6 ft 5 in (1.96 m)	195 lb (88 kg)	So	Coatesville HS	Coatesville, PA
G	30	Ky'Aire Sumpter	6 ft 1 in (1.85 m)	165 lb (75 kg)	Sr	Harrisburg HS	Harrisburg, PA
G	32	Akeem Taylor Jr.	6 ft 3 in (1.91 m)	180 lb (82 kg)	So	Chester HS	Chester, PA
G	34	Kameron Roberts	6 ft 2 in (1.88 m)	175 lb (79 kg)	Fr	Middletown HS	Townsend, DE
G	35	Winston Edwards	6 ft 0 in (1.83 m)	160 lb (73 kg)	So	Pocono Mountain East HS	East Stroudsburg, PA
F	40	Zahmir Carroll	6 ft 5 in (1.96 m)	220 lb (100 kg)	So	Chester HS	Chester, PA
C	44	Oenis Medina	6 ft 8 in (2.03 m)	250 lb (113 kg)	Sr	Shippensburg	Reading, PA
C	50	Robert Tucker	6 ft 7 in (2.01 m)	215 lb (98 kg)	Jr	Manor	Philadelphia, PA

Head coach

- Bernie Driscoll (Dickinson)

Assistant coach(es)

- Tom York (Kutztown)
- Bilal Salaam (Kutztown)
- Scott Blair (Kutztown)

Legend

- (C) Team captain
- (S) Suspended
- (I) Ineligible
- (W) Walk-on
- Injured
- Current redshirt

Roster
Last update: February 20, 2022
