= Jim Clements (American football) =

American football coach and player

Current position
- Title: Head coach
- Team: Kutztown
- Conference: PSAC
- Record: 103–30

Playing career
- 1991–1994: Widener
- Position: Defensive lineman

Coaching career (HC unless noted)
- 1995: Widener (GA)
- 1997: Widener (GA)
- 1998–2002: Widener (ST/LB/DL)
- 2003: Widener (DC)
- 2004–2005: Delaware Valley (DC)
- 2006–2013: Delaware Valley
- 2014–present: Kutztown

Head coaching record
- Overall: 169–54
- Tournaments: 7–6 (NCAA D-II playoffs); 3–3 (NCAA D-III playoffs)

Accomplishments and honors

Championships
- 4 MAC (2008–2011); 6 PSAC East Division (2016, 2019, 2021, 2023–2025); 4 PSAC (2021, 2023–2025)

Jim Clements is an American college football coach and former player. He is the head football coach for Kutztown University of Pennsylvania, a position he has held since 2014. Clements served as the head football coach at Delaware Valley College—now known as Delaware Valley University—in Doylestown, Pennsylvania from 2006 to 2013. He won AFCA Division II National Coach of the Year in 2025.

== Head coaching record ==
Year	Team	Overall	Conference	Standing	Bowl/playoffs	D3/D2^{#}	AFCA^{°}
Delaware Valley Aggies (Middle Atlantic Conference) (2006–2013)
2006	Delaware Valley	8–3	8–2	2nd			
2007	Delaware Valley	5–5	5–2	T–2nd			
2008	Delaware Valley	8–3	5–2	T–1st			
2009	Delaware Valley	10–2	7–0	1st	L NCAA Division III Second Round	16	
2010	Delaware Valley	9–3	6–1	1st	L NCAA Division III Second Round	16	
2011	Delaware Valley	11–1	8–0	1st	L NCAA Division III Second Round	13	
2012	Delaware Valley	8–3	7–2	3rd			
2013	Delaware Valley	7–4	6–3	T–3rd			
Delaware Valley:		66–24	52–12				
Kutztown Golden Bears (Pennsylvania State Athletic Conference) (2014–present)
2014	Kutztown	6–5	5–4	T–3rd (West)			
2015	Kutztown	7–4	5–2	T–2nd (East)			
2016	Kutztown	7–4	7–0	1st (East)			
2017	Kutztown	8–3	5–2	3rd (East)			
2018	Kutztown	9–2	5–1	2nd (East)	L NCAA Division II First Round		
2019	Kutztown	11–2	7–0	1st (East)	L NCAA Division II Second Round		16
2020–21	No team—COVID-19						
2021	Kutztown	11–2	7–0	1st (East)	L NCAA Division II Quarterfinal		8
2022	Kutztown	8–3	5–2	2nd (East)			
2023	Kutztown	12–3	7–0	1st (East)	L NCAA Division II Semifinal	8	7
2024	Kutztown	11–1	7–0	1st (East)	L NCAA Division II Second Round	5	7
2025	Kutztown	13–1	7–0	1st (East)	L NCAA Division II Semifinal	4	3
Kutztown:		103–30	67–11				
Total:		169–54					
National championship Conference title Conference division title or championship game berth
