= Kutztown Golden Bears =

Athletic program of Kutztown University

- University: Kutztown University of Pennsylvania
- Nickname: Golden Bears
- NCAA: Division II
- Conference: Pennsylvania State Athletic Conference (PSAC)
- Athletic director: Renee Hellert
- Location: Kutztown, Pennsylvania
- Varsity teams: 22
- Football stadium: Andre Reed Stadium
- Basketball arena: Keystone Hall
- Baseball stadium: North Campus Field
- Colors: Maroon and gold
- Mascot: Avalanche
- Fight song: "Go, Bears, Go"
- Website: kubears.com
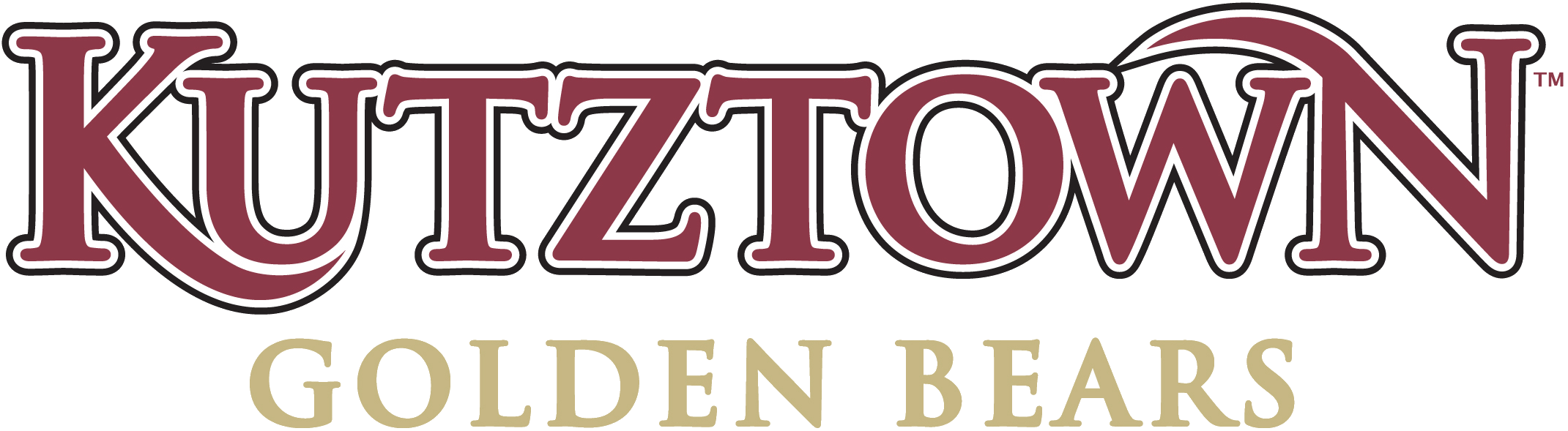

The Kutztown Golden Bears are the sports teams that represent Kutztown University of Pennsylvania (pronunciation rhymes with "Puts"), located in Kutztown, Pennsylvania. Kutztown University is a member of NCAA Division II and competes in the Pennsylvania State Athletic Conference (PSAC). The university sponsors eight men's and fourteen women's intercollegiate sports. In 2022, Kutztown University added women's acrobatics & tumbling as its 22nd varsity sport.

Kutztown won the Dixon Trophy in 2006, which is awarded to the PSAC school with the best overall athletic program that year. Kutztown became the fifth league school to win the award after placing second in the rankings in the 2003–04 and 2004–05 school years. Famous former athletes from Kutztown include Pro Football Hall of Famer Andre Reed, two-time Super Bowl champion with the Denver Broncos, John Mobley, NFL football players Bruce Harper, Doug Dennison and Craig Reynolds and World Series champion pitcher with the San Francisco Giants, Ryan Vogelsong.

The university provides an array of intramural and club sports programs for students. Leagues and tournaments are organized by the department of Recreational Services every semester, and range from badminton tournaments to rock climbing competitions.

== Overview ==
From the mid-1930s up until 1961, Kutztown's sports teams were known as the Golden Avalanche. In 1961, Kutztown replaced the Golden Avalanche nickname with the Golden Bears as the university's nickname. In later years, Golden Bear mascots came into play. Before 2005, Goldie and Griz served as the KU Golden Bear mascots. However, they were both "graduated" to make way for a new mascot. The Raymond Entertainment Group of Newark, Delaware, helped KU create the new mascot. On October 1, 2005, at Kutztown's football game versus West Chester University, Kutztown University unveiled Avalanche as the school's new mascot. Avalanche is so named to honor Kutztown State College during the time of the Golden Avalanche sports teams.

The Golden Bears can be seen in more places than the sports fields. Golden Bear statues are located near the basketball courts on South Campus and in North Campus near the Boehm Science Building. Along with the statues, several residential areas are named after the Golden Bear. Golden Bear Village South behind University Place and Golden Bear Village West next to Rothermel Hall are student apartments that hold the Golden Bear moniker.

== Varsity sports ==
Men's sports	Wome's sports
Baseball	Acrobatics
Basketball	Basketball
Cross country	Bowling
Football	Cross country
Swimming	Field hockey
Tennis	Golf
Track and field^{1}	Lacrosse
Wrestling	Softball
	Swimming
	Tennis
	Track and field^{1}
	Volleyball
^{1} – includes both indoor and outdoor

=== Acrobatics & Tumbling ===
Kutztown's newest varsity sport, women's acrobatics & tumbling, made its debut during the 2022 season, going 3–3 under first-year head coach Karah Paull. Paull (formerly Naples) was an All-American as a student-athlete at Fairmont State and is working quickly to make the Golden Bears a contender. Kutztown competes as a member of the National Collegiate Acrobatics & Tumbling Association (NCATA).

=== Baseball ===
Kutztown University baseball is currently under the direction of coach Eric Folmar, who took over prior to the 2020 season.

On March 14, 2008, former head coach Chris Blum became the fastest collegiate baseball coach to 200 career victories, when KU defeated California (Pa.) in Blum's 314th career game Kutztown has won PSAC Eastern Division titles in 1997, 1999, 2001 and 2007; PSAC Championships in 1966, 1999, 2002, 2005, 2006 and 2008; and has won the North Atlantic Regional tournament in 2001, 2002, 2004 and 2007. The team spent the week of April 30, 2007, as the No. 1 ranked team in Division II, a first for the program.

Ryan Vogelsong, a Golden Baseball alum, won a World Series title with the San Francisco Giants. On May 30, 2022, pitcher Matt Swarmer became the fourth Kutztown University product to make his Major League Baseball debut, pitching six innings and recording a no decision in game one of a doubleheader against the Milwaukee Brewers.

=== Basketball ===
Kutztown University's men's basketball team was established in 1903. It is currently under the direction of head coach Bernie Driscoll, who has led the program since 2000. The team won the PSAC East regular-season title in 1988 and shared the division title in 2008. Since 2003, the team has posted five straight winning seasons, and has an appearance in the PSAC title game (2004).

The Kutztown University women's basketball team was established in 1971. Head coach Janet Malouf has served in that position since 1994. She has the most wins in The team appeared in the PSAC playoffs every season from 1995–96 to 2005–06.

=== Cross Country ===
Kutztown University's men's and women's cross country teams are under the direction of head coach Ray Hoffman, who has led the program since 1998. Coach Hoffman has also served as head coach of the track and field programs since the 2006–07 school year.

The women's team has earned five trips to the NCAA Championship, including a best-ever 14th-place finish in 2006 after winning its first-ever NCAA East Regional title. Hoffman has twice been named the PSAC Women's Coach of the Year (2000, 2006) and the KU Women's Athletics Coach of the Year (2000–01, 2001–02).

The women's cross country team has competed in the NCAA Championships four times. In 2000, Megan Seefeldt won the individual PSAC title, becoming the first in the program's history. The team has placed as high as second at the PSAC Championships and has not placed lower than fourth in the last six seasons. The men's team has placed fourth twice and fifth once at the 2000–02 PSAC Championships, and finished fifth twice and sixth once at the NCAA Regionals.

During Hoffman's eight seasons as coach:

- One runner has won a PSAC individual title (Megan Seefeldt)
- 21 made All-PSAC honors
- 1 was named PSAC Runner of the Year
- 3 were named PSAC Rookies of the Year
- 19 won All-Region awards
- 1 won an All-America honor
- 26 won USTFCCCA All-Academic Team individual awards
- 1 won Academic All-America of the Year

=== Field Hockey ===
The Kutztown University field hockey team is led by head coach Marci Scheuing, who has served in that role since 2013. She was named the PSAC Coach of the Year in 2015. Betty Wesner was named the NFHCA Division II coach of the year in 1997, the NHFCA South Region Coach of the Year in 2007, and the PSAC coach of the year in 1988, 1997, 2004 and 2007. In 2019, Kutztown advanced to the NCAA Division II national semifinals before falling to eventual champion West Chester. The team finished as the NCAA Division II runner-up in 1997. Kutztown has been a perennial nationally ranked powerhouse in the PSAC and Division II field hockey the past many seasons. In 2023, the Golden Bears won the NCAA Division II Field Hockey National Championship, defeating East Stroudsburg University by a score of 2–1. This was Coach Scheuing's and the university's first national title.

=== Football ===
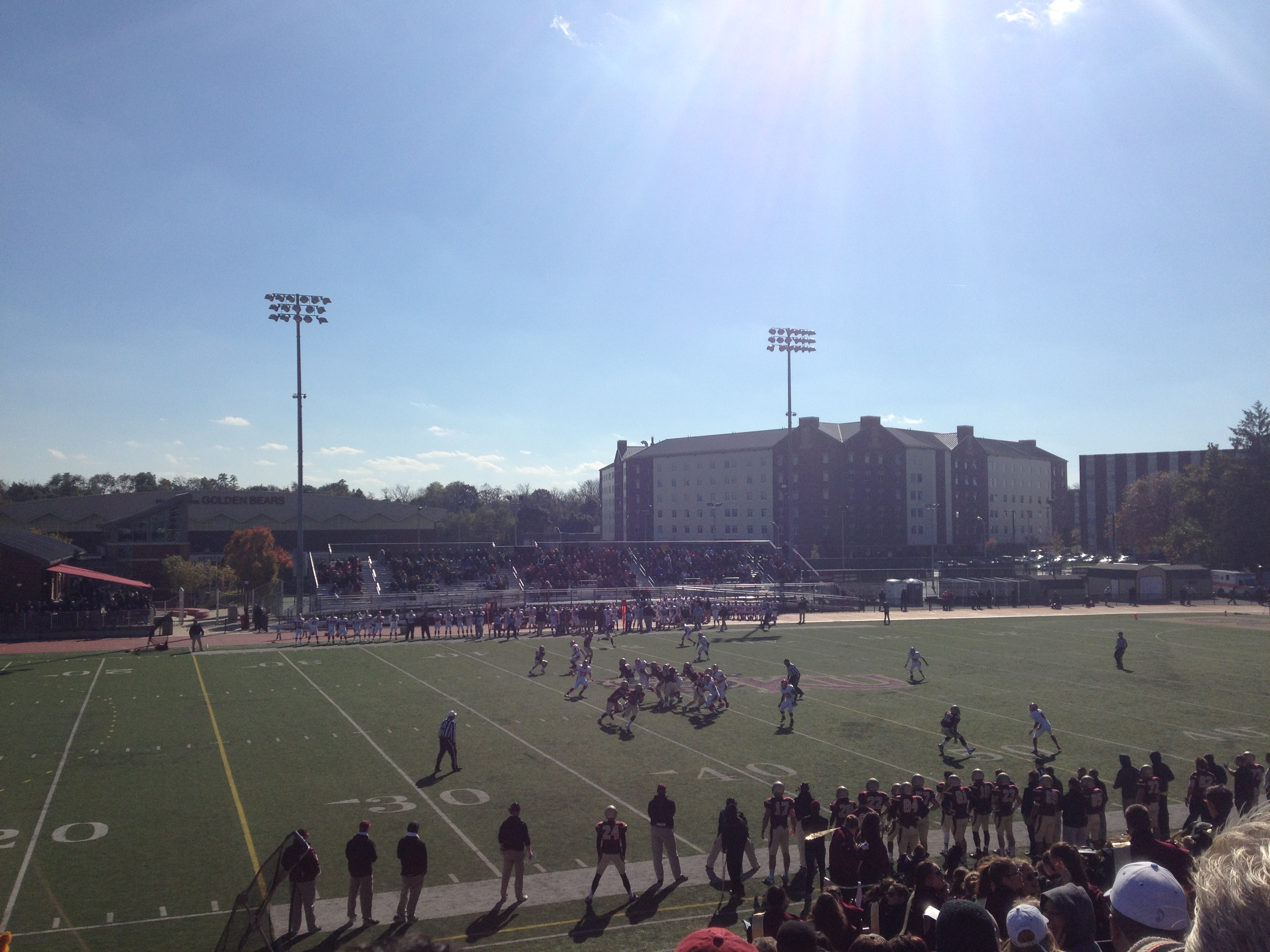
Kutztown Golden Bears playing East Stroudsburg at University Field, later renamed Andre Reed Stadium in honor of Kutztown alumnus Andre Reed, in October 2013

The Kutztown University football team is led by coach Jim Clements. Clements led the Golden Bears to the 2021 PSAC East title and PSAC championship. In 2023, Kutztown made its deepest NCAA DII Championship tournament run in program history, reaching the national semifinals. Clements came to Kutztown after serving as the head coach at Division III Delaware Valley College for eight years. He is the winningest coach in Delaware Valley history with an overall record of 66–24 from 2006 to 2013, including a perfect 10–0 regular season in 2011. He earned four Middle Atlantic Conference (MAC) championships (2008–11) and three NCAA second round appearances (2009–11).

In 2006, in the first game played at night at Kutztown's Andre Reed Stadium following the installation of lights at the stadium, Kutztown defeated Clarion in a 27–10 win.

PSAC Players of the Year from Kutztown, since 1985:

All players won their awards as members of the PSAC Eastern Division

- Offensive Players of the Year:
  - Mike deMarteleire (2000)
  - Kevin Morton (2010)
  - Jordan Morgan
  - Collin DiGalbo (2019)
- Defensive Players of the Year:
  - Michael Baldwin (2005)
  - Pete Mendez (2001)
  - Terrence Miles (1999)
- Athletes of the Year (Award was broken up into Offense and Defense in 1996):
  - John Mobley (1995)
  - Andy Breault (1990, 1991)
  - Paul Magistro (1985)
- Rookies of the Year
  - Stephen Gammage (2002)
  - Pete Mendez (1999)
  - Mike DeMarteleire (1998)
  - Kevin Wimberly (1995)
  - Kevin Mobley (1994)
  - Nick Hanych (1993)
  - Mark Steinmeyer (1988)

PSAC Coach of The Year (Eastern Division) from Kutztown (since 1985)

- Barry Fetterman (1991)
- Raymond Monica (2010)
- Jim Clements (2016, 2019, 2021 & 2024)

=== Golf ===
Kutztown University's women's golf team is led by head coach Robert Fisher, who has served in the role since January 2002. The team was established in 2000–01 as the first women's golf program in the Pennsylvania State Athletic Conference.

=== Lacrosse ===
The Kutztown University women's lacrosse program returned to varsity status in 2008. The program, which was instituted in 1975 and discontinued in 1990, won the PSAC title in 1982, and is responsible for the first PSAC Championship by a women's team in KU history. The team is now under the direction of head coach Kristin Nicholson.

=== Soccer ===
The Kutztown Women's Soccer Team is under the direction of Erik Burstein, who became head coach in 2007. Burstein came to Kutztown from Bowling Green State University, where he served as an assistant coach during the 2006 season. The women's soccer program has recorded six-straight double-digit win seasons, and had four-straight appearances in the PSAC Playoffs (2003–06) and was the PSAC runner-up in 2004 and 2005.

PSAC Women's Soccer Rookie of the Year from Kutztown (Since 1994)

- Kim Kelty (2004)

Coach Jeff Schellenberger was named PSAC East Coach of the Year in 2004.

Players from Kutztown have been selected to the All-PSAC Women's Soccer Team 28 times since 1994. Kim Kelty was selected four times, the most at Kutztown University.

=== Softball ===
Kutztown University's softball team is led by head coach Judy Lawes, who has served as head coach since 1987. Lawes has led the Golden Bears to appearances in the NCAA Division II Tournament in 1994–96 and then every year from 2000 to 2008. Lawes has also guided Kutztown to 13 PSAC playoff appearances, including four runner-up finishes (1988, 1989, 1996, 2007). Lawes has been named PSAC East Coach of the Year in 1989, 1994, 2000 and 2007. Lawes also garnered the Dr. Dorothy Moyer Award in 1994, 1995, 2000, 2007 and 2008, which is presented to the KU Coach of the Year for women's athletics. Other accomplishments include setting the school record for overall wins (48) in 2008 and wins in the Eastern Division (22) in 2007. Additionally, her team won a share of the PSAC East title in 1994 and won the title outright in 2007 and 2008.

=== Swimming ===
The Kutztown University men’s and women's swimming program is guided by head coach Tim Flannery, who has served in that position since 1996–97. The men's team was discontinued following the 2008–2009 season. The team was reinstated for the 2024-25 season. The program as a whole has produced two NCAA champions, Ed Flory (1977–'78) and Claudine Gruver (1997).

=== Tennis ===
Kutztown University's men's and women's tennis teams are under the direction of head coach Wyatt Pauley, who completed his first season in 2021–22. The men's team has won the PSAC title in 1999–2000, 2000–01, 2001–02, 2003–04, 2004–05, 2005–06 and 2006–07. The women's team has finished a best-ever second in the PSAC twice (1993–94, 2004–05).

=== Track & Field ===
Kutztown University's Men's and women's indoor and outdoor track and field teams are under the direction of head coach Ray Hoffman, who has led the program since the 2006–07 season. From 1998 to 2006, Hoffman served as an assistant coach, while also serving as head coach of the cross country teams. The men's team won the PSAC outdoor title in 1983, 1996, 1998, 2000, 2001 and 2002; and the Eastern College Athletic Conference indoor title in 1995, 1997, 1998, 2000 and 2001. The women's team has won the PSAC outdoor title in 1997, 2000 and 2005; the PSAC indoor title in 2004, 2005, 2006 and 2019; and the ECAC indoor title in 2001. The program has produced two NCAA Division II National Champions, Mike Cantrel (pole vault, 1987 indoors) and Tara Crozier (hammer, 1997 outdoors).

=== Volleyball ===
The Kutztown women's volleyball team was formerly led by head coach John Gump, who retired following the 2021–22 school year. Before coaching at Kutztown, he was head coach of Division III Allentown College, later renamed DeSales University. Gump is the winningest coach in Kutztown University volleyball history. The team has won four PSAC East titles under his watch and went a perfect 10–0 in the PSAC East in 2003.

Gump was named the 2003 and 2006 PSAC East Coach of the Year, the 1998–99 and 2003–04 KU Women's Athletics Coach of the Year.

Since 1983, 22 players have been selected to the All-PSAC East First Team.

PSAC Eastern Division Rookies of the Year (since 1991):

- Sarah Knaub (1995)
- Jessie Didier (2000)
- Ebany Hetrick (2002)

PSAC Eastern Division Athletes of the Year (since 1991):

- Jessie Didier (2003)
- Sarah Brandon (2004, 2005, 2006)

=== Wrestling ===
The Kutztown University wrestling team is led by head coach Robert Fisher, who has served in that role since 2000–01. The program was established in 1940, but was discontinued three years later due to World War II. In 1965, Dan Hinkel was the head coach when the program was reinstated. In 2007, Joe Kemmerer won the first NCAA championship, winning the 133 pound title at the Division II Championships. Kemmerer repeated his feat by becoming a two-time national champion at 133 lbs. in 2009. Since then, heavyweights Ziad Haddad (2014 and 2015) and Andrew Dunn Jr. (2019) have gone on to win national titles for the Maroon and Gold.

== Club Sports ==
=== Rugby ===
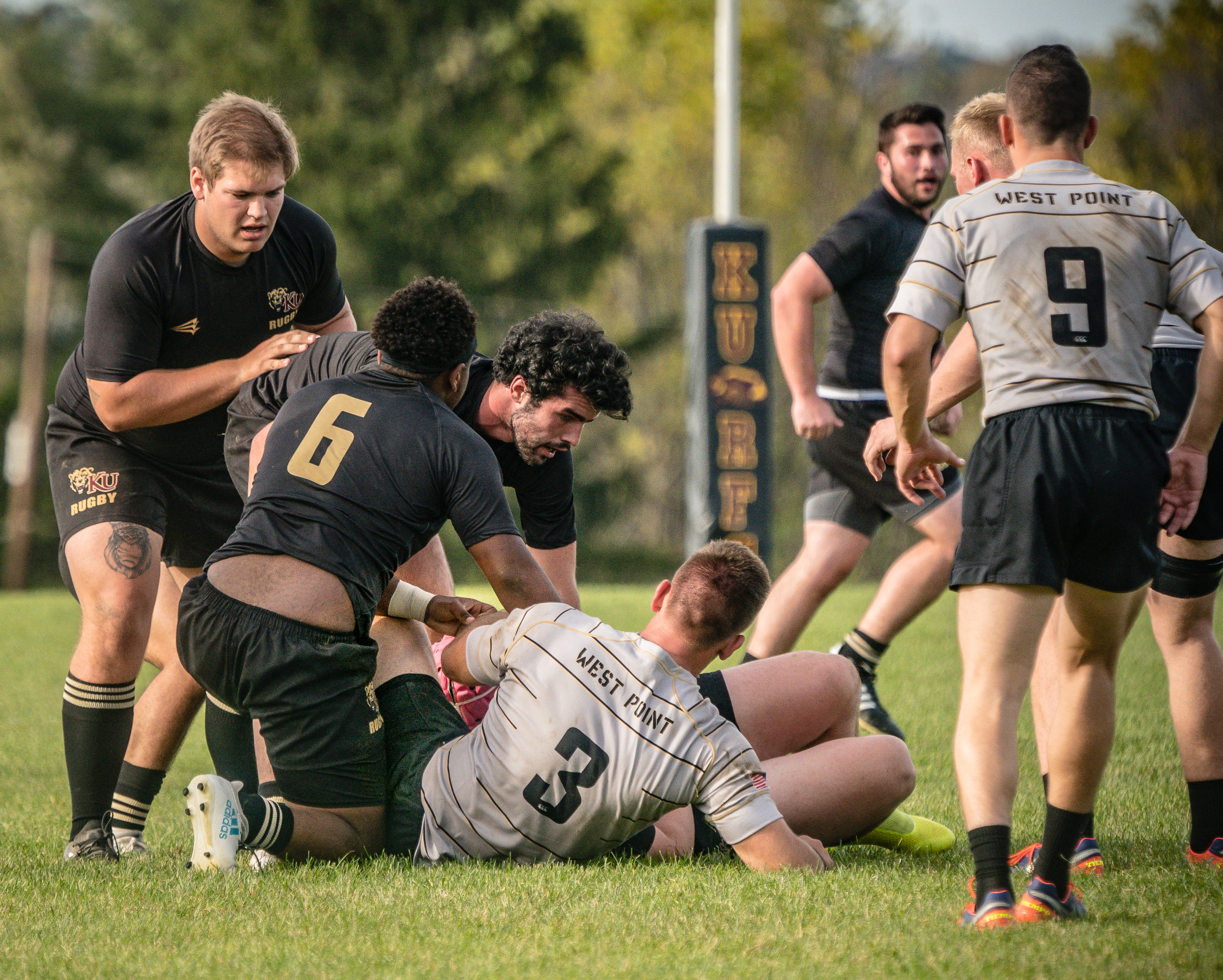
Kutztown v Army (in white jersey) match in 2017

Founded in 1984 by Andrew Lewis, the Kutztown Rugby Football Club represents Kutztown in college rugby competitions, and has been a member of USA Rugby since 1988. Gregg 'Doc' Jones has been the team's head coach since 1986.

Kutztown plays in the East Conference of Division 1-A Rugby. There have been multiple tournament wins, international tours, and playoff appearances. In 2008, Kutztown advanced to the national quarterfinals, led by Marco Barnard who later went on to play for the U.S. national sevens team. In spring 2013, Kutztown reached the USA Rugby national playoff quarterfinals.

Kutztown has also been successful in rugby sevens, and in May 2022, the Golden Bears captured their first Collegiate Rugby Championship Men's Premier Division national championship with a 17–12 victory over Dartmouth in New Orleans. In February 2012, Kutztown beat Missouri and Miami–Ohio en route to reaching the semifinals at the Las Vegas Invitational. Kutztown began the fall 2012 season ranked as the #1 team in college rugby sevens. Kutztown reached the semifinals of the 2013 Collegiate Rugby Championship, the highest profile competition in college rugby sevens, played at PPL Park in Philadelphia and broadcast live on NBC. Kutztown improved on their performance the following year, reaching the finals of the 2014 Collegiate Rugby Championship before losing to Cal 24–21. Kutztown has continued to see success in tournaments, including a national semifinals appearance in the 2019 Collegiate Rugby Championships, where they lost to eventual champion Lindenwood 30–12.
