= 2021 NCAA Division II football rankings =

Rankings for the 2021 NCAA Division II football season

- Season: 2021
- Postseason: Single-elimination
- Preseason No. 1: West Florida
- National champions: Ferris State
- Conference with most teams in final AFCA poll: PSAC (4)

The 2021 National Collegiate Athletic Association (NCAA) Division II football rankings consists primarily of The AFCA Coaches' Poll, determined by coaches part of NCAA Division II football programs. The following weekly polls determine the top 25 teams at the NCAA Division II level of college football for the 2021 season.

== Legend ==
	Increase in ranking
	Decrease in ranking
	Not ranked previous week or no change
	Selected for College Football Playoff
(#–#)	Win–loss record
(Italics)	Number of first place votes
т	Tied with team above or below also with this symbol

== American Football Coaches Association (AFCA) poll ==
	Preseason Aug 16	Week 1 Sep 7	Week 2 Sep 13	Week 3 Sep 20	Week 4 Sep 27	Week 5 Oct 4	Week 6 Oct 11	Week 7 Oct 18	Week 8 Oct 25	Week 9 Nov 1	Week 10 Nov 8	Week 11 Nov 15	Week 12 (Final) Dec 20	
1.	West Florida (26)	West Florida (1–0) (28)	West Florida (2–0) (29)	West Florida (3–0) (30)	West Florida (3–0) (30)	West Florida (4–0) (30)	West Florida (5–0) (30)	Ferris State (6–0) (23)	Ferris State (7–0) (26)	Ferris State (8–0) (24)	Ferris State (9–0) (25)	Ferris State (10–0) (30)	Ferris State (14–0) (30)	1.
2.	Minnesota State (2)	Ferris State (1–0) (1)	Ferris State (2–0) (1)	NW Missouri State (2–0)	NW Missouri State (3–0)	NW Missouri State (4–0)	NW Missouri State (5–0)	Valdosta State (6–0) (7)	Valdosta State (7–0) (4)	Valdosta State (8–0) (6)	Valdosta State (9–0) (5)	West Florida (9–1)	Valdosta State (12–2)	2.
3.	Ferris State	Minnesota State (1–0)	NW Missouri State (1–0)	Ferris State (3–0)	Ferris State (4–0)	Ferris State (5–0)	Ferris State (5–0)	Colorado Mines (7–0)	West Georgia (7–1)	California (PA) (8–0)	West Florida (8–1)	NW Missouri State (9–1)	Colorado Mines (12–2)	3.
4.	NW Missouri State (1)	NW Missouri State (1–0)	Valdosta State (2–0)	Valdosta State (3–0)	Valdosta State (3–0)	Valdosta State (4–0)	Valdosta State (5–0)	West Georgia (6–1)	California (PA) (7–0)	West Florida (7–1)	NW Missouri State (8–1)	Grand Valley State (9–1)	NW Missouri State (11–2)	4.
5.	Slippery Rock	Valdosta State (1–0)	Lenoir-Rhyne (1–0)	Colorado Mines (3–0)	Colorado Mines (4–0)	Colorado Mines (5–0)	Colorado Mines (6–0)	California (PA) (6–0)	West Florida (6–1)	Ouachita Baptist (8–1)	Grand Valley State (8–1)	Valdosta State (9–1)	Shepherd (13–2)	5.
6.	Lenoir–Rhyne т	Lenoir-Rhyne (1–0) (1)	Slippery Rock (2–0)	Slippery Rock (3–0)	Notre Dame (OH) (4–0)	Slippery Rock (5–0)	Slippery Rock (6–0)	West Florida (5–1)	Ouachita Baptist (7–1)	NW Missouri State (7–1)	Notre Dame (OH) (9–1)	Notre Dame (OH) (10–1)	Bowie State (12–2)	6.
7.	Valdosta State т	Texas A&M–Commerce (1–0)	Colorado Mines (2–0)	Notre Dame (OH) (3–0)	Slippery Rock (4–0)	Grand Valley State (4–0)	Grand Valley State (5–0)	Ouachita Baptist (6–1)	Grand Valley State (6–1)	Grand Valley State (7–1)	Harding (9–1)	Harding (10–1)	Grand Valley State (10–2)	7.
8.	Texas A&M–Commerce	Slippery Rock (1–0)	Notre Dame (OH) (2–0)	Ouachita Baptist (3–0)	Grand Valley State (3–0)	Wingate (4–0)	Wingate (5–0)	Grand Valley State (5–1)	NW Missouri State (6–1)	Notre Dame (OH) (8–1)	Shepherd (9–1)	Shepherd (10–1)	Kutztown (11–2)	8.
9.	Notre Dame (OH)	Colorado Mines (1–0)	Ouachita Baptist (2–0)	Grand Valley State (2–0)	West Georgia (4–0)	Henderson State (5–0)	Henderson State (6–0)	Notre Dame (OH) (6–1)	Notre Dame (OH) (7–1)	Bentley (8–0)	Colorado Mines (9–1)	Colorado Mines (10–1)	Notre Dame (OH) (11–2)	9.
10.	Colorado Mines	Notre Dame (OH) (1–0)	Grand Valley State (1–0)	Shepherd (3–0)	Wingate (3–0)	West Alabama (5–0)	West Alabama (6–0)	NW Missouri State (5–1)	Harding (7–1)	Harding (8–1)	Slippery Rock (9–1)	Bowie State (10–1)	Harding (11–2)	10.
11.	Ouachita Baptist	Ouachita Baptist (1–0)	Shepherd (2–0)	Minnesota–Duluth (3–0)	Midwestern State (4–0)	Minnesota State (4–1)	Ouachita Baptist (5–1)	Shepherd (6–1)	Bentley (7–0)	Shepherd (8–1)	West Georgia (7–2)	Western Colorado (10–1)	Angelo State (11–3)	11.
12.	CSU Pueblo	Indianapolis (1–0)	Indianapolis (2–0)	Tiffin (3–0)	Nebraska-Kearney (4–0)	Ouachita Baptist (4–1)	West Georgia (5–1)	Harding (6–1)	Shepherd (7–1)	West Georgia (7–2)	Bowie State (9–1)	Kutztown (10–1)	West Florida (9–2)	12.
13.	Central Missouri	Shepherd (1–0)	Minnesota–Duluth (2–0)	Wingate (3–0)	Henderson State (4–0)	West Georgia (4–1)	California (PA) (6–0)	Bentley (7–0)	Bowie State (7–1)	Colorado Mines (8–1)	Henderson State (9–1)	West Georgia (8–2)	West Georgia (9–3)	13.
14.	Indianapolis	Grand Valley State (0–0)	IUP (1–0)	West Georgia (3–0)	Augustana (SD) (4–0)	Notre Dame (OH) (4–1)	Notre Dame (OH) (5–1)	Bowie State (6–1)	Colorado Mines (7–1)	Bowie State (8–1)	Western Colorado (9–1)	California (PA) (9–1)	New Haven (10–2)	14.
15.	Shepeherd	IUP (0–0)	Tiffin (2–0)	Midwestern State (3–0)	West Alabama (4–0)	California (PA) (5–0)	Shepherd (5–1)	West Alabama (6–1)	Slippery Rock (7–1)	Slippery Rock (8–1)	California (PA) (8–1)	Frostburg State (10–1)	Nebraska-Kearney (10–3)	15.
16.	Grand Valley State	Tiffin (1–0)	Wingate (2–0)	Nebraska-Kearney (3–0)	Lenoir-Rhyne (2–1)	Bowie State (4–1) т	Bowie State (5–1)	Minnesota–Duluth (6–1)	Wingate (6–1)	Henderson State (8–1)	Kutztown (9–1)	Albany State (9–1)	Western Colorado (10–2)	16.
17.	IUP	Harding (1–0)	Angelo State (2–0)	Lenoir-Rhyne (1–1)	Minnesota State (3–1)	Shepherd (4–1) т	Bentley (6–0)	Slippery Rock (6–1)	Nebraska-Kearney (7–1)	Augustana (SD) (8–1)	Frostburg State (9–1)	Ouachita Baptist (9–2)	Newberry (10–3)	17.
18.	Bowie State	Kutztown (1–0)	West Georgia (2–0)	Henderson State (3–0)	Truman (4–0)	Bentley (5–0)	Minnesota–Duluth (5–1)	Wingate (5–1)	Henderson State (7–1)	Western Colorado (8–1)	Albany State (9–1)	New Haven (9–1)	Albany State (10–2)	18.
19.	Tiffin	CSU Pueblo (0–1)	Minnesota State (1–1)	Indianapolis (2–1)	Ouachita Baptist (3–1)	Minnesota–Duluth (4–1)	Midwestern State (5–1)	Midwestern State (5–1)	Augustana (SD) (7–1)	Kutztown (8–1)	New Haven (8–1)	Slippery Rock (9–2)	Bemidji State (10–3)	19.
20.	Kutztown	Minnesota–Duluth (1–0)	Midwestern State (2–0)	Minnesota State (2–1)	Bowie State (3–1)	Midwestern State (4–1)	Harding (5–1)	Henderson State (6–1)	Western Colorado (7–1)	Frostburg State (8–1)	Ouachita Baptist (8–2)	Bentley (9–1)	Slippery Rock (9–3)	20.
21.	Lindenwood	Wingate (1–0)	Texas A&M–Commerce (1–1)	West Alabama (3–0)	Shepherd (3–1)	Harding (4–1)	Nebraska–Kearney (5–1)	Nebraska-Kearney (6–1)	Kutztown (7–1)	Midwestern State (6–2)	Bentley (8–1)	Nebraska-Kearney (9–2)	California (PA) (9–1)	21.
22.	Harding	Angelo State (1–0)	Delta State (2–0)	Augustana (SD) (3–0)	Minnesota–Duluth (3–1)	Nebraska-Kearney (4–1)	Augustana (SD) (5–1)	Augustana (SD) (6–1)	Colorado Mesa (6–1)	Albany State (8–1)	Nebraska-Kearney (8–2)	Henderson State (9–2)	Frostburg State (10–1)	22.
23.	Minnesota–Duluth	Pittsburg State (1–0)	Nebraska-Kearney (2–0)	Bowie State (2–1)	Harding (3–1)	Frostburg State (5–0)	Wayne State (NE) (5–1)	IUP (5–1)	Frostburg State (7–1)	West Alabama (7–2)	Minnesota–Duluth(8–2)	Minnesota–Duluth (9–2)	Ouachita Baptist (9–2)	23.
24.	Carson-Newman т	West Georgia (1–0)	Bowie State (1–1)	IUP (1–1)	Bentley (4–0)	Chowan (5–0)	Western Colorado (5–1)	Western Colorado (6–1)	Midwestern State (5–2)	New Haven (7–1)	Washburn (8–2)	Washburn (9–2)	Bentley (9–2)	24.
25.	Wingate т	Bowie State (0–1)	Henderson State (2–0)	Delta State (2–1)	California (PA) (4–0) т	Augustana (SD) (4–1)	Kutztown (5–1)	Kutztown (6–1)	Albany State (7–1)	Nebraska-Kearney (7–2)	Augustana (SD) (8–2)	Augustana (SD) (9–2)	Washburn (9–3)	25.
26.					IUP (2–1) т									26.
	Preseason Aug 16	Week 1 Sep 7	Week 2 Sep 13	Week 3 Sep 20	Week 4 Sep 27	Week 5 Oct 4	Week 6 Oct 11	Week 7 Oct 18	Week 8 Oct 25	Week 9 Nov 1	Week 10 Nov 8	Week 11 Nov 15	Week 12 (Final) Dec 20	
		Dropped: 13 Central Missouri; 21 Lindenwood; 24 Carson-Newman	Dropped: 17 Harding; 18 Kutztown; 19 CSU Pueblo; 23 Pittsburg State	Dropped: 17 Angelo State; 21 Texas A&M–Commerce	Dropped: 12 Tiffin; 19 Indianapolis; 25 Delta State	Dropped: 16 Lenoir-Rhyne; 18 Truman; 25т IUP	Dropped: 11 Minnesota State; 23 Frostburg State; 24 Chowan	Dropped: 23 Wayne State (NE)	Dropped: 15 West Alabama; 16 Minnesota–Duluth; 23 IUP	Dropped: 16 Wingate; 22 Colorado Mesa	Dropped: 21 Midwestern State; 23 West Alabama	Dropped: None	Dropped: 22 Henderson State; 23 Minnesota–Duluth; 25 Augustana (SD)	
