= Sox Harrison Stadium =

Football stadium in Edinboro, Pennsylvania

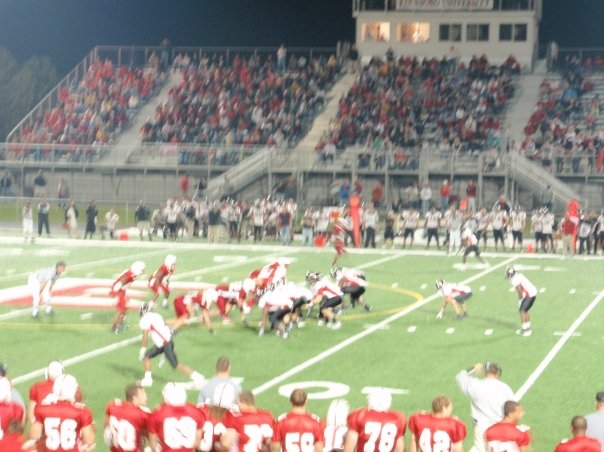
- Interactive map of Sox Harrison Stadium
- Location: Edinboro, Pennsylvania
- Coordinates: 41.8752°N 80.117308°W
- Owner: Pennsylvania Western University
- Operator: Pennsylvania Western University, Edinboro
- Capacity: 6,000
- Surface: Artificial

Construction
- Opened: 1965
- Renovated: 2007; 1999
- Expanded: 1997

Tenant
- Edinboro Fighting Scots (NCAA D-II) (1965-present)

Sox Harrison Stadium is a football stadium in Edinboro, Pennsylvania, on the campus of Pennsylvania Western University, Edinboro (PennWest Edinboro). It is home to the Edinboro Fighting Scots of the Pennsylvania State Athletic Conference (PSAC). The stadium is named for B. Regis "Sox" Harrison, who served as the first head football coach at PennWest Edinboro from 1926 to 1938 and 1941 to 1942, before being inducted into the university's Athletic Hall of Fame. The stadium officially opened in 1965.

It underwent several renovations in the late 1990s. A new grandstand was added to the visiting side of the stadium in 1997, increasing the capacity by 2,500. A press box was also added, along with a locker room and training facilities. In 1999, the stadium received a new sound system and improved handicapped access.

The stadium received further renovations in 2007, when the university added artificial turf, lighting to allow for night games, and a new scoreboard at the south end-zone. The seating capacity was increased to 6,000, as well as being able to accommodate standing-room only spectators. The Edinboro Fighting Scots football team played their first-ever night game at the stadium on September 20, 2008, against Pennsylvania Western University, California, which resulted in a 35–31 loss in front of an announced crowd of 7,213.

The stadium also serves as a neutral site for PIAA high school playoff football games.
