= 2021 NCAA Division II football season =

American college football season

- Total No. of teams: 166
- Regular season: August 28 – November 13, 2021
- Playoffs: November 20 – December 18, 2021
- National Championship: McKinney Independent School District Stadium; McKinney, TX; December 18, 2021
- Champion: Ferris State
- Harlon Hill Trophy: Tyson Bagent, QB, Shepherd

The 2021 NCAA Division II football season, part of college football in the United States organized by the National Collegiate Athletic Association (NCAA) at the Division II level, began on August 28 and ended December 18 with the Division II championship at the McKinney Independent School District Stadium in McKinney, Texas. Ferris State defeated Valdosta State, 58–17, for the title.

== D-II team wins over FCS teams ==
September 3: Southern Connecticut 28, Central Connecticut 21
September 4: West Florida 42, McNeese State 36

== Conference changes and new programs ==
=== Membership changes ===
School	Former conference	New conference
Ashland Eagles	GLIAC	G-MAC
Alderson Broaddus Battlers	G-MAC	Mountain East
Allen Yellow Jackets	Appalachian (NAIA)	Independent
Azusa Pacific Cougars	GNAC	Dropped program
Barton Bulldogs	Returning program, last competed 1950	Independent
Bluefield State Big Blues	Returning program, last competed 1980	Independent
Dixie State Trailblazers	RMAC	WAC (FCS)
Edward Waters Tigers	Independent (NAIA)	Southern Intercollegiate Athletic
Emory and Henry Wasps	Old Dominion (D-III)	Independent
Erskine Flying Fleet	Returning program, last competed 1951	Independent
Florida Tech Panthers	Gulf South	Dropped program
Minnesota Crookston Golden Eagles	Northern Sun	Dropped program
UNC Pembroke Braves	Independent	Mountain East
St. Cloud State Huskies	Northern Sun	Dropped program
Tarleton Texans	Lone Star	WAC (FCS)

== Conference standings ==
=== Super Region 1 ===
2021 Great Midwest Athletic Conference football standings
	Conf.			Overall
Team	W		L	W		L
Findlay $^	6	–	1	8	–	4
Tiffin	5	–	2	8	–	3
Hillsdale #	5	–	2	6	–	6
Ohio Dominican	4	–	3	7	–	4
Ashland	4	–	3	5	–	5
Lake Erie	2	–	5	5	–	6
Kentucky Wesleyan	1	–	6	3	–	8
Walsh	1	–	6	2	–	9
$ – Conference champion; ^ – NCAA Division II playoff participant; # – America's Crossroads Bowl participant

2021 Mountain East Conference football standings
	Conf.			Overall
Team	W		L	W		L
No. 22 Frostburg State #	9	–	1	10	–	1
No. 9 Notre Dame (OH) $^	9	–	1	11	–	2
Charleston (WV)	8	–	2	8	–	2
UNC Pembroke	6	–	4	6	–	5
West Virginia State	6	–	4	6	–	5
Fairmont State	5	–	5	5	–	6
Wheeling	5	–	5	5	–	6
Concord	4	–	6	4	–	6
West Liberty	4	–	6	4	–	7
Glenville State	3	–	7	3	–	7
Alderson Broaddus	1	–	9	1	–	10
West Virginia Wesleyan	0	–	10	0	–	11
$ – Conference champion; ^ – NCAA Division II playoff participant; # – Provisional NCAA Division II member; Rankings from AFCA poll

2021 Northeast-10 Conference football standings
	Conf.			Overall
Team	W		L	W		L
No. 14 New Haven $^	8	–	0	10	–	2
No. 24 Bentley ^	7	–	1	9	–	2
Stonehill	6	–	2	8	–	2
Assumption	5	–	3	5	–	5
Southern Connecticut	3	–	5	4	–	6
Saint Anselm	3	–	5	3	–	6
American International	2	–	6	4	–	6
Pace	2	–	6	2	–	8
Franklin Pierce	0	–	8	0	–	10
$ – Conference champion; ^ – NCAA Division II playoff participant; Rankings from AFCA poll

2021 Pennsylvania State Athletic Conference football standings
	Conf.			Overall
Team	W		L	W		L
East Division
No. 8 Kutztown xy$^	7	–	0	11	–	2
No. 5 Shepherd x^	6	–	1	13	–	2
Shippensburg	5	–	2	9	–	2
West Chester	4	–	3	6	–	5
East Stroudsburg	3	–	4	5	–	6
Bloomsburg	2	–	5	3	–	8
Millersville	1	–	6	2	–	9
Lock Haven	0	–	7	1	–	10
West Division
No. 20 Slippery Rock xy^	6	–	1	9	–	3
No. 21 California (PA) x	5	–	1	9	–	1
IUP	5	–	2	7	–	3
Gannon	3	–	4	5	–	6
Edinboro	3	–	4	4	–	6
Mercyhurst	3	–	4	4	–	7
Seton Hill	2	–	5	5	–	6
Clarion	0	–	6	0	–	10
Championship: Kutztown 38, Slippery Rock 32
$ – Conference champion; x – Division champion/co-champions; y – Championship game participant; ^ – NCAA Division II playoff participant; Rankings from AFCA poll

=== Super Region 2 ===
2021 Central Intercollegiate Athletic Association football standings
	Conf.			Overall
Team	W		L	W		L
Northern Division
No. 6 Bowie State xy$^	7	–	0	12	–	2
Virginia Union	5	–	2	6	–	4
Chowan	4	–	3	7	–	3
Virginia State	3	–	4	3	–	6
Elizabeth City State	3	–	4	3	–	7
Lincoln (PA)	1	–	6	1	–	9
Southern Division
Fayetteville State xy	7	–	0	8	–	2
Shaw	5	–	2	6	–	4
Winston–Salem State	3	–	4	3	–	6
Johnson C. Smith	1	–	5	1	–	7
Livingstone	1	–	5	1	–	8
St. Augustine's	1	–	6	1	–	7
Championship: Bowie State 17, Fayetteville State 7
$ – Conference champion; x – Division champion/co-champions; y – Championship game participant; ^ – NCAA Division II playoff participant; Rankings from AFCA poll

2021 Gulf South Conference football standings
	Conf.			Overall
Team	W		L	W		L
No. 2 Valdosta State +^	6	–	1	12	–	2
No. 12 West Florida +^	6	–	1	9	–	2
No. 13 West Georgia ^	5	–	2	9	–	3
West Alabama	4	–	3	6	–	4
Delta State	3	–	4	5	–	6
Mississippi College	2	–	5	4	–	6
North Greenville	2	–	5	5	–	6
Shorter	0	–	7	3	–	8
+ – Conference co-champions; ^ – NCAA Division II playoff participant; Rankings from AFCA poll

2021 South Atlantic Conference football standings
	Conf.			Overall
Team	W		L	W		L
No. 17 Newberry $^	7	–	1	10	–	3
Lenoir–Rhyne ^	6	–	2	8	–	3
Mars Hill	6	–	2	8	–	3
Wingate †	6	–	2	7	–	3
Virginia–Wise	4	–	4	5	–	6
Tusculum	3	–	5	5	–	6
Catawba †	2	–	6	5	–	4
Carson–Newman	1	–	7	1	–	9
Limestone †	1	–	7	0	–	9
$ – Conference champion; ^ – NCAA Division II playoff participant; † – Catawba's cancellations against Wingate and Limestone were counted as forfeits in the conference standings.; Rankings from AFCA Poll

2021 Southern Intercollegiate Athletic Conference football standings
	Conf.			Overall
Team	W		L	W		L
East Division
No. 18 Albany State xy$^	6	–	0	10	–	2
Savannah State	5	–	1	8	–	2
Morehouse	4	–	2	4	–	6
Fort Valley State	3	–	3	5	–	5
Benedict	2	–	4	5	–	5
Clark Atlanta	0	–	6	2	–	8
West Division
Miles xy	4	–	2	6	–	5
Kentucky State x	4	–	2	7	–	4
Lane	3	–	3	6	–	4
Tuskegee	2	–	4	3	–	8
Central State (OH)	0	–	6	1	–	9
Not competing for championship
Allen #		–		4	–	5
Edward Waters #		–		4	–	7
Championship: Albany State 31, Miles 0
$ – Conference champion; x – Division champion/co-champions; y – Championship game participant; ^ – NCAA Division II playoff participant; # – Provisional NCAA Division II member; Rankings from AFCA poll

2021 NCAA Division II independents football records
	Conf.			Overall
Team	W		L	W		L
Emory & Henry #		–		6	–	4
Bluefield State		–		4	–	3
Barton		–		6	–	5
Erskine		–		3	–	8
# – Provisional NCAA Division II member

=== Super Region 3 ===
2021 Great American Conference football standings
	Conf.			Overall
Team	W		L	W		L
No. 10 Harding $^	10	–	1	11	–	2
Henderson State	9	–	2	9	–	2
No. 23 Ouachita Baptist	9	–	2	9	–	2
SE Oklahoma State #	8	–	3	9	–	3
Oklahoma Baptist #	7	–	4	8	–	4
East Central	7	–	4	7	–	4
Arkansas–Monticello	5	–	6	5	–	6
Arkansas Tech	4	–	7	4	–	7
Southern Arkansas	4	–	7	4	–	7
NW Oklahoma State	2	–	9	2	–	9
Southern Nazarene	1	–	10	1	–	10
SW Oklahoma State	0	–	11	0	–	11
$ – Conference champion; ^ – NCAA Division II playoff participant; # – bowl participant (Oklahoma Baptist: Heritage Bowl, SE Oklahoma State: Live United Texarkana Bowl); Rankings from AFCA poll

2021 Great Lakes Intercollegiate Athletic Conference football standings
	Conf.			Overall
Team	W		L	W		L
No. 1 Ferris State $^	7	–	0	14	–	0
No. 7 Grand Valley State ^	6	–	1	10	–	2
Michigan Tech	5	–	2	6	–	4
Saginaw Valley State	4	–	3	7	–	4
Northern Michigan	2	–	5	4	–	7
Davenport	2	–	5	3	–	8
Wayne State (MI)	2	–	5	2	–	9
Northwood	0	–	7	1	–	9
$ – Conference champion; ^ – NCAA Division II playoff participant; Rankings from AFCA Poll

2021 Great Lakes Valley Conference football standings
	Conf.			Overall
Team	W		L	W		L
Lindenwood $^	7	–	0	9	–	3
Indianapolis	5	–	2	7	–	4
Truman State #	4	–	3	9	–	3
Missouri S&T	4	–	3	6	–	5
McKendree	3	–	4	4	–	7
Southwest Baptist	3	–	4	4	–	7
Quincy	2	–	5	4	–	7
William Jewell	0	–	7	0	–	11
$ – Conference champion; ^ – NCAA Division II playoff participant; # – America's Crossroads Bowl participant; Rankings from AFCA poll

2021 Mid-America Intercollegiate Athletics Association football standings
	Conf.			Overall
Team	W		L	W		L
No. 4 NW Missouri State $^	9	–	1	11	–	2
No. 15 Nebraska–Kearney ^	9	–	2	10	–	3
No. 25 Washburn ^	9	–	2	9	–	3
Pittsburg State	8	–	3	8	–	3
Missouri Western	6	–	5	6	–	5
Emporia State #	6	–	5	6	–	6
Fort Hays State	5	–	6	5	–	6
Central Oklahoma	4	–	7	4	–	7
Central Missouri	4	–	7	4	–	7
Missouri Southern	3	–	8	3	–	8
Northeastern State	2	–	9	2	–	9
Lincoln (MO)	0	–	10	0	–	10
$ – Conference champion; ^ – NCAA Division II playoff participant; # – Live United Texarkana Bowl participant; Rankings from AFCA Poll

=== Super Region 4 ===
2021 Great Northwest Athletic Conference football standings
	Conf.			Overall
Team	W		L	W		L
Central Washington $^	4	–	0	8	–	3
Western Oregon	2	–	2	4	–	6
Simon Fraser	0	–	4	1	–	7
$ – Conference champion; ^ – NCAA Division II playoff participant; Rankings from AFCA poll

2021 Lone Star Conference football standings
	Conf.			Overall
Team	W		L	W		L
Midwestern State $	6	–	1	7	–	3
No. 11 Angelo State ^	5	–	2	11	–	3
West Texas A&M	5	–	2	7	–	4
Texas A&M–Commerce	5	–	2	7	–	4
Texas A&M–Kingsville	3	–	4	5	–	5
UT Permian Basin #	3	–	4	5	–	6
Eastern New Mexico	1	–	6	3	–	7
Western New Mexico	0	–	7	1	–	9
$ – Conference champion; ^ – NCAA Division II playoff participant; # – Heritage Bowl participant; Rankings from AFCA poll

2021 Northern Sun Intercollegiate Conference football standings
	Conf.			Overall
Team	W		L	W		L
North Division
No. 19 Bemidji State x$^	9	–	2	10	–	3
Minnesota–Duluth x^	9	–	2	9	–	3
Northern State	7	–	4	7	–	4
MSU Moorhead	5	–	6	5	–	6
Mary	3	–	3	4	–	7
Minot State	2	–	9	2	–	9
Concordia–St. Paul	1	–	10	1	–	10
South Division
Augustana (SD) x^	9	–	2	9	–	3
Sioux Falls	8	–	3	8	–	3
Winona State	7	–	4	7	–	4
Wayne State (NE)	7	–	4	7	–	4
Minnesota State	6	–	5	6	–	5
SW Minnesota State	2	–	9	2	–	9
Upper Iowa	1	–	10	1	–	10
$ – Conference champion; x – Division champion/co-champions; ^ – NCAA Division II playoff participant; Rankings from AFCA Poll

2021 Rocky Mountain Athletic Conference football standings
	Conf.			Overall
Team	W		L	W		L
No. 3 Colorado Mines $^	8	–	1	12	–	2
No. 16 Western Colorado ^	8	–	1	10	–	2
Colorado Mesa	7	–	2	8	–	2
CSU Pueblo	6	–	3	6	–	5
Chadron State	5	–	4	6	–	5
South Dakota Mines	4	–	5	6	–	5
New Mexico Highlands	4	–	5	4	–	6
Black Hills State	2	–	7	4	–	7
Adams State	1	–	8	1	–	10
Fort Lewis	0	–	9	0	–	11
$ – Conference champion; ^ – NCAA Division II playoff participant; Rankings from AFCA poll

== Postseason ==
=== Bracket ===
==== Super Region 1 ====
First Round; November 20, 2021; Campus sites
4	New Haven*	38
Bentley	13
2	Shepherd*	38
Findlay	31
3	Notre Dame (OH)*	33
Slippery Rock	25

Second Round; November 27, 2021; Campus sites
1	Kutztown	10
4	New Haven	7
2	Shepherd	38
3	Notre Dame (OH)	34

Quarterfinals; December 4, 2021; Campus sites
1	Kutztown	28
2	Shepherd	30

==== Super Region 2 ====
First Round; November 20, 2021; Campus sites
4	Albany State*	7
West Georgia	23
2	Bowie State*	31
Lenoir–Rhyne	10
3	West Florida*	30
Newberry	33*

Second Round; November 27, 2021; Campus sites
1	Valdosta State*	66
West Georgia	35
2	Bowie State	13
Newberry	10

Quarterfinals; December 4, 2021; Campus sites
1	Valdosta State	41
2	Bowie State	17

==== Super Region 3 ====
First Round; November 20, 2021; Campus sites
4	Grand Valley State*	20
Lindenwood	3
2	Harding*	30
Washburn	14
3	NW Missouri State*	50
Central Washington	21

Second Round; November 27, 2021; Campus sites
1	Ferris State	54
4	Grand Valley State	20
2	Harding	9
3	NW Missouri State	28

Quarterfinals; December 4, 2021; Campus sites
1	Ferris State	41
3	NW Missouri State	20

==== Super Region 4 ====
First Round; November 20, 2021; Campus sites
4	Augustana (SD)*	24
Bemidji State	28
2	Angelo State*	48
Minnesota–Duluth	14
3	Western Colorado*	24
Nebraska–Kearney	31

Second Round; November 27, 2021; Campus sites
1	Colorado Mines*	55
Bemidji State	6
2	Angelo State	20
Nebraska–Kearney	7

Quarterfinals; December 4, 2021; Campus sites
1	Colorado Mines	34
2	Angelo State	26

==== National semifinals ====
Teams that advanced to the semifinals were re-seeded.

Semifinals; December 11; Hosted by higher seeded team
1	Ferris State	55
4	Shepherd	7
2	Valdosta State	34
3	Colorado Mines	31

National Championship; December 18; McKinney ISD Stadium, McKinney, TX
1	Ferris State	58
2	Valdosta State	17

== See also ==
- 2021 NCAA Division I FBS football season
- 2021 NCAA Division I FCS football season
- 2021 NCAA Division III football season
- 2021 NAIA football season
- 2021 U Sports football season
