= Kutztown Golden Bears football =

- First season: 1895
- Head coach: Jim Clements; 12th season, 103–30 (.774)
- Location: Kutztown, Pennsylvania
- Stadium: Andre Reed Stadium (capacity: 5,600)
- NCAA division: Division II
- Conference: PSAC
- Colors: Maroon and gold

Conference championships
- PSAC: 2011, 2021, 2023, 2024, 2025

Division championships
- PSAC East: 1980, 2011, 2016, 2019, 2021, 2023, 2024, 2025
- Website: KU Bears Football

The Kutztown Golden Bears team represents Kutztown University, located in Kutztown, Pennsylvania, in NCAA Division II college football. The Golden Bears began playing football in 1895, and compete as members of the Pennsylvania State Athletic Conference (PSAC).

Kutztown play their home games at Andre Reed Stadium.

== Conference history ==
- 1951–present: Pennsylvania State Athletic Conference

== Alumni ==
- Doug Dennison
- Bruce Harper
- John Mobley
- Andre Reed
