= Robert B. Redman Stadium =

Football stadium in Bloomsburg, Pennsylvania

Coordinates: 41.015850°N 76.449651°W

- Interactive map of Robert B. Redman Stadium
- Full name: Danny Hale Field at Robert B. Redman Stadium
- Address: Bloomsburg, PA; United States
- Owner: Bloomsburg University
- Operator: Bloomsburg University
- Capacity: 5,000
- Type: Stadium
- Current use: Football

Construction
- Opened: February 1974; 52 years ago

Tenant
- Bloomsburg Huskies football (NCAA D-II)

Robert B. Redman Stadium is an American football stadium on the campus of Bloomsburg University in Bloomsburg, Pennsylvania. The stadium is used by the Bloomsburg Huskies football and track and field teams.

Construction on Redman Stadium began in 1972 on what is now known as the upper campus. The upper campus is home to all athletic fields and facilities for the Huskies' intercollegiate athletics teams, which compete in NCAA Division II (with the exception of wrestling, which competes in NCAA Division I). Student housing was later added to the upper campus as well.

The stadium was completed in time for the 1974 football season at a cost of $725,000. It was officially opened and dedicated on September 21, 1974. The stadium is named after former head coach Robert B. Redman, who led the team from 1947 until 1951. He compiled a record of 38 wins, 4 losses and won three PSAC championships during his time as head coach.

Redman Stadium's first major renovation took place in the spring of 2008. The project included a new two level press box with elevator, new restroom facilities, new visitor seating, new parking lot, new ADA-compliant hand rails, track & field facilities, permanent lighting and a new artificial playing surface. The project was completed in time for the 2008 season at a cost of $3.45 million.

Seating capacity at Redman Stadium was 5,000 when originally constructed and is now officially listed at 4,775. Over the years, many crowds have exceeded capacity. The attendance record was set in 1985 when a crowd of 7,483 turned out for the Huskies’ homecoming game against Millersville University.
