= Andre Reed Stadium =

College football stadium for Kutztown University

Coordinates: 40.51034°N 75.78019°W

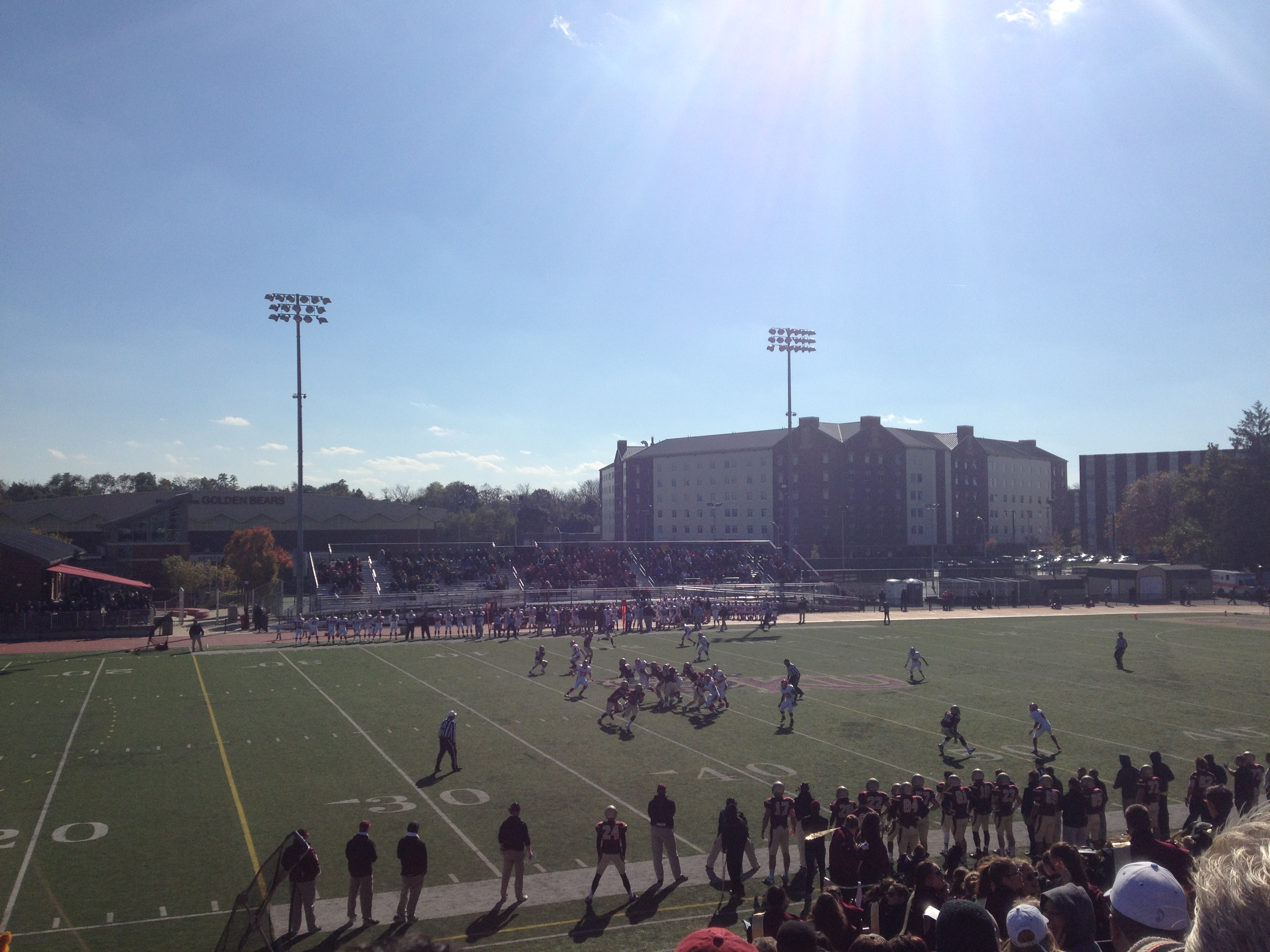
- Kutztown playing East Stroudsburg at Andre Reed Stadium in October 2013
- Interactive map of Andre Reed Stadium
- Location: Kutztown University; S Campus Dr. & Normal Ave, Kutztown, Pennsylvania 19530, U.S.
- Owner: Kutztown University of Pennsylvania
- Operator: Kutztown University of Pennsylvania
- Capacity: 5,600
- Surface: Field turf

Construction
- Renovated: 2006 - Lights Added

Tenants
- Kutztown Golden Bears Football (NCAA); Kutztown Golden Bears Field Hockey (NCAA)

University Field at Andre Reed Stadium (or simply Andre Reed Stadium, formerly University Field) is an outdoor college football stadium located in Kutztown, Pennsylvania on the campus of Kutztown University of Pennsylvania. It is home to both Kutztown's football and field hockey programs, both of which compete in the Pennsylvania State Athletic Conference.

The stadium has a capacity of 5,600 making it the ninth-largest venue in the PSAC.

University Field was renamed to University Field at Andre Reed Stadium on October 18, 2014, in a ceremony honoring Andre Reed, a former football player at Kutztown and in the National Football League who was inducted into the Pro Football Hall of Fame.
