= Mihalik-Thompson Stadium =

Stadium in Slippery Rock, Pennsylvania

- Interactive map of Mihalik-Thompson Stadium
- Former names: N. Kerr Thompson Stadium
- Location: Slippery Rock, Pennsylvania, U.S.
- Coordinates: 41.0633°N 80.0375°W
- Owner: Slippery Rock University
- Operator: Slippery Rock University Athletics
- Capacity: 10,000
- Surface: AstroPlay
- Current use: Field hockey, football, lacrosse, soccer

Construction
- Opened: 1974

Tenant
- Pittsburgh Passion (2025–present)

Website
- rockathletics.com/facilities/mihalik-thompson-stadium/7

Mihalik-Thompson Stadium is a stadium in Slippery Rock, Pennsylvania at Slippery Rock University. The facility includes Bob DiSpirito field, William Lenox Track, Gail Rose stadium Lodge and the Jerry Bujbel weight training facility.

The stadium is primarily used for NCAA Division II sports including football, field hockey, lacrosse, soccer, and track and field. The facility is the home field of the Slippery Rock University of Pennsylvania. The stadium was built in 1974 and has a capacity of 10,000. In the fall of 2003, Bob DiSpirito field was changed from grass to AstroPlay and lights were added to the facility.

Old Thompson Stadium was the home for Slippery Rock's football team prior to the Mihalik-Thompson Stadium's completion in 1974.
