= Miller Stadium =

Stadium in Pennsylvania, USA

George P. Miller Stadium
- Miller Stadium
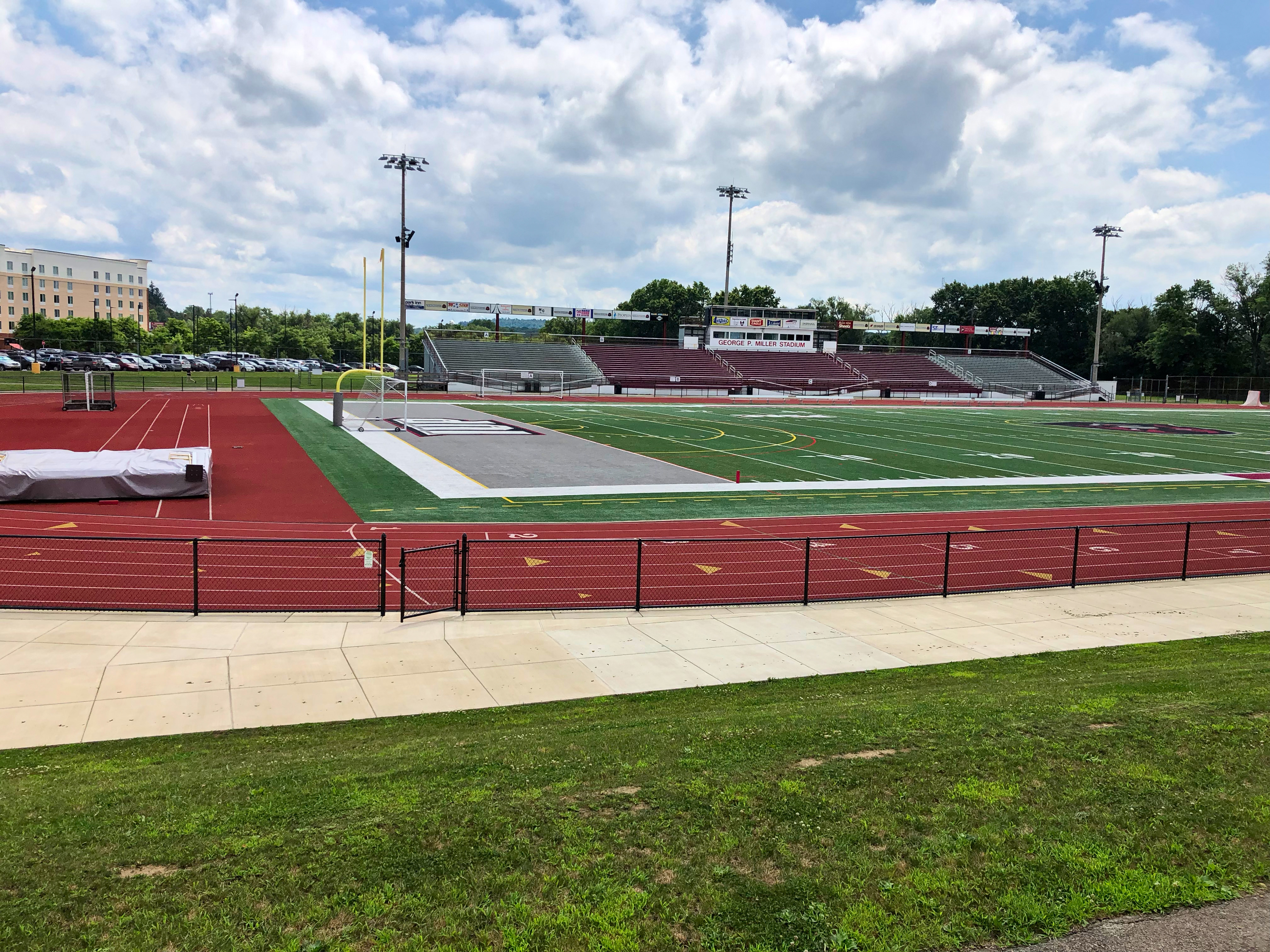
- Interactive map of George P. Miller Stadium
- Location: 11th Street, Indiana, Pennsylvania
- Coordinates: 40.613496°N 79.162266°W
- Owner: Indiana University of Pennsylvania
- Capacity: 11,000
- Surface: Artificial

Frank Cignetti Field at George P. Miller Stadium is a stadium located on the campus of Indiana University of Pennsylvania in Indiana, Pennsylvania. It is the home field for the IUP Crimson Hawks football, field hockey, and track & field teams.

The field surface is artificial turf and the stadium utilizes an Electro-Voice audio system.

In 2013, the field was named for former football head coach and College Football Hall of Fame member Frank Cignetti Sr.

== See also ==
- Pennsylvania State Athletic Conference
