= Edinboro Fighting Scots =

- University: Pennsylvania Western University, Edinboro
- Nickname: Fighting Scots
- NCAA: Division II (primary); Division I (men's wrestling)
- Conference: PSAC (primary); MAC (men's wrestling)
- Athletic director: Dr. Katherine Robbins
- Location: Edinboro, Pennsylvania
- Varsity teams: 17 (8 men's, 9 women's)
- Football stadium: Sox Harrison Stadium
- Basketball arena: McComb Fieldhouse
- Aquatics center: McComb Fieldhouse Natatorium
- Other venues: Mike S. Zafirovski Sports and Recreation Dome
- Colors: Red and white
- Fight song: Scotland the Brave
- Website: gofightingscots.com
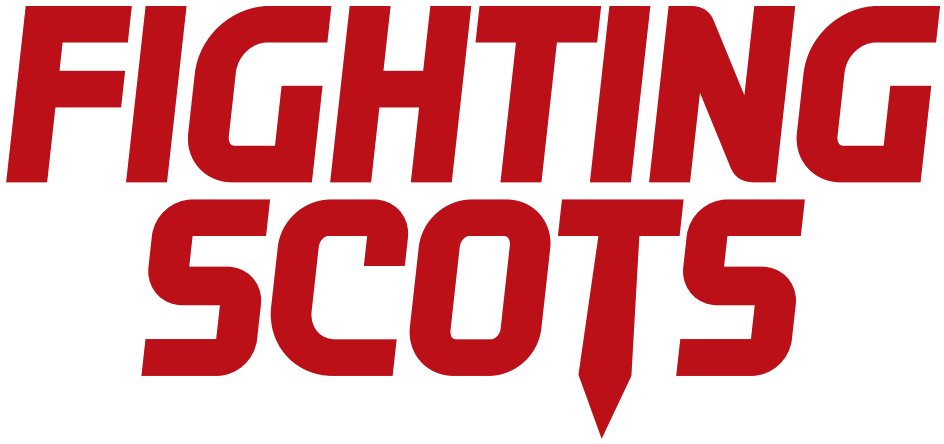

The Edinboro Fighting Scots are the athletic teams that represent Pennsylvania Western University, Edinboro (PennWest Edinboro), located in Edinboro, Pennsylvania, in National Collegiate Athletic Association (NCAA) Division II intercollegiate sports. The Fighting Scots are members of the Pennsylvania State Athletic Conference (PSAC) for 15 of 17 varsity sports. The wrestling team competes in the Mid-American Conference (MAC) as a member of NCAA Division I, and the wheelchair basketball team competes outside of NCAA governance in the National Wheelchair Basketball Association (NWBA) Intercollegiate Division. The Fighting Scots have been a member of PSAC since its foundation in 1951.

== History ==
The men's and women's cross country and track programs won the only national titles in school history. The men's cross country and track program also won NAIA men's national championship in 1975 and 1976, as well as the NCAA men's national championship in 1986, 1987, 1988, and 1990. Women's lacrosse was introduced in the 2008 season. It has one of the nation's best wheelchair basketball teams.

=== Conferences ===
==== Primary ====
- 1908–1950: Independent
- 1951–present: Pennsylvania State Athletic Conference

==== Single sport ====
- 1988–2019: Eastern Wrestling League (wrestling)
- 2019–present: Mid-American Conference (wrestling)
- 1996–present: National Wheelchair Basketball Association Intercollegiate Division (wheelchair basketball)

== Varsity teams ==
=== List of teams ===
Men's sports (8)

- Basketball
- Cross country
- Football
- Swimming
- Tennis
- Track and field
- Wheelchair basketball
- Wrestling (Division I)

Women's sports (9)

- Basketball
- Cross country
- Lacrosse
- Soccer
- Softball
- Swimming
- Tennis
- Track and field
- Volleyball

== National championships ==
=== Team ===
Sport	Association	Division	Year	Opponent/Runner-up	Score
Men's cross country (6)	NAIA (2)	Single	1975	Eastern New Mexico	97–144 (-47)
Men's cross country (6)	NAIA (2)	Single	1976	Adams State	56–103 (-47)
Men's cross country (6)	NCAA (4)	Division II	1986	South Dakota State	56–79 (-23)
Men's cross country (6)	NCAA (4)	Division II	1987	Mankato State	95–113 (-18)
Men's cross country (6)	NCAA (4)	Division II	1988	South Dakota State	77–98 (-21)
Men's cross country (6)	NCAA (4)	Division II	1990	Shippensburg	50–125 (-75)

== Individual sports ==
=== Cross country ===
The cross country teams are among the most consistent in Division II with 48 conference titles (30 men's, 18 women's). Formed in 1969 by Doug Watts, the team won 2 NAIA titles in 1975 and 1976. The program won 4 NCAA championships in 1986, 1987, 1988, and 1990. Under Watts, Edinboro would qualify the national meet for 31 consecutive years (1979–2009, a Division II record). Watts served as head coach for 44 years before retiring in 2013.

=== Wrestling ===
PennWest Edinboro has one of the premier NCAA Division I collegiate wrestling programs. Prior to moving to the Division I level in 1986, Edinboro was already well-known in NAIA and NCAA Division II levels. Bruce Baumgartner, Olympic wrestler, began instructing at PennWest Edinboro in 1984 as an assistant coach, and was promoted to head coach in 1991. He guided the Fighting Scots to three top 15 finishes in the NCAA Division I Wrestling Championships. Baumgartner became the director of athletics in 1997. PennWest Edinboro's wrestling program has produced 120 PSAC champions, 59 EWL champions, 60 NCAA All-Americans, 4 NCAA Division I champions, 9 NCAA Division II and NAIA national champions, 2 USA Olympic team members, 17 PSAC tournament team championships, and 14 EWL tournament team championships.

Three former PennWest Edinboro wrestlers and former All-Americans have transitioned and found success in mixed martial arts. Former NCAA Division I champion Josh Koscheck is a former Ultimate Fighting Championship (UFC) title challenger and Bellator fighter. Another former NCAA Division I champion, Gregor Gillespie is a former UFC fighter. Former NCAA Division I runner-up Chris Honeycutt is a former Bellator fighter and current Absolute Championship Akhmat (ACA) fighter.

The current PennWest Edinboro wrestling head coach is Matt Hill, who previously served as an assistant at Kent State Univsersity. Hill previously wrestled collegiately at PennWest Edinboro.

Former head wrestling coach Tim Flynn led the Fighting Scots from 1998 to 2018. Tim Flynn was an All-American himself while in the NCAA at Penn State University in 1987, winning the EWL title and finishing seventh at Nationals. Flynn has received numerous awards for his accomplishments with the program, including:

- 12-time PSAC Coach of the Year
- Seven-time EWL Coach of the Year
- 2014 NCAA Division I Coach of the Year
