= List of college football career coaching winning percentage leaders =

This is a list of college football career coaching winning percentage leaders. It is limited to coaches who coached at least 10 seasons and have a winning percentage of at least .750 at four-year college or university programs in either the National Association of Intercollegiate Athletics (NAIA) or the National Collegiate Athletic Association (NCAA). If a team competed at a time before the official organization of either of the two groups, but is generally accepted as a "college football program," it is also included.

Leading the list is Larry Kehres, who compiled a .929 winning percentage while coaching the Mount Union Purple Raiders from 1986 to 2012. The longest tenure among coaches on the list is that of John Gagliardi, who was a head coach from 1949 until retiring after the 2012 season. Gagliardi also leads all listed coaches in total games, wins, and losses. Former Vanderbilt head coach Dan McGugin has the most ties of anyone on the list.

== Key ==
bold	Expected to be active as head coach in 2026
†	Inducted into the College Football Hall of Fame

== College football coaches with a .750 winning percentage ==
List may be incomplete; updated through end of 2025 season; minimum 10 years coaching.

Name	First year	Last year	Years	Games	Wins	Losses	Ties	Win %	Teams
Larry Kehres^{†}	1986	2012	27	359	332	24	3	.929	Mount Union (1986–2012)
Knute Rockne^{†}	1918	1930	13	122	105	12	5	.881	Notre Dame (1918–1930)
Tony Annese	2012	2025	13	172	153	21	0	.879	Ferris State (2012–present)
Frank Leahy^{†}	1939	1953	13	129	107	13	9	.864	Boston College (1939–1940), Notre Dame (1941–1943, 1946–1953)
Bob Reade^{†}	1979	1994	16	170	146	23	1	.862	Augustana (IL) (1979–1994)
Kalen DeBoer	2005	2025	11	144	124	20	0	.861	Sioux Falls (2005–2009), Fresno State (2020–2021), Washington (2022–2023), Alabama (2024–present)
Pete Fredenburg	1998	2021	24	270	231	39	0	.856 (Note: Fredenburg's on-field record was 257–40 for a winning percentage of .865. In June 2020, Mary Hardin–Baylor vacated a total of 26 wins and 1 loss from the 2016 and 2017 seasons.)	Mary Hardin–Baylor (1998–2021)
Doyt Perry^{†}	1955	1964	10	93	77	11	5	.855	Bowling Green (1955–1964)
Urban Meyer^{†}	2001	2018	17	219	186	32	0	.853	Bowling Green (2001–2002), Utah (2003–2004), Florida (2005–2010), Ohio State (2012–2018)
George Washington Woodruff^{†}	1892	1905	12	164	139	23	2	.854	Penn (1892–1901), Illinois (1903), Carlisle (1905)
Dick Farley^{†}	1987	2003	17	136	114	19	3	.849	Williams (1987–2003)
Kirby Smart	2016	2025	10	148	117	21	0	.848	Georgia (2016–present)
Gary Fasching	2013	2025	12	132	120	22	0	.845	Saint John's (MN) (2013–present)
Jeff Devanney	2006	2025	19	160	135	25	0	.844	Trinity (CT) (2006–present)
Dave Maurer^{†}	1969	1983	15	155	129	23	3	.842	Wittenberg (1969–1983)
Joseph Smith	2006	2025	19	206	173	33	0	.840	Linfield (2006–present)
Paul Hoernemann^{†}	1946	1959	14	124	102	18	4	.839	Heidelberg (1946–1959)
Barry Switzer^{†}	1973	1988	16	190	157	29	4	.837	Oklahoma (1973–1988)
Tom Osborne^{†}	1973	1997	25	307	255	49	3	.836	Nebraska (1973–1997)
Don Coryell^{†}	1957	1972	15	154	127	24	3	.834	Whittier (1957–1959), San Diego State (1961–1972)
Percy Haughton^{†}	1899	1924	13	120	97	17	6	.833	Cornell (1899–1900), Harvard (1908–1916), Columbia (1923–1924)
Steve Ryan	2002	2025	24	299	249	50	0	.833	Morningside (2002–present)
Fielding H. Yost^{†}	1898	1926	28	245	198	35	12	.833	Ohio Wesleyan (1897), Nebraska (1898), Kansas (1899), Stanford (1900), San Jose State (1900), Michigan (1901–1923, 1925–1926)
Robert Neyland^{†}	1926	1952	21	216	173	31	12	.829	Tennessee (1926–1934, 1936–1940, 1946–1952)
Jake Gaither^{†}	1936	1969	26	251	205	41	5	.827	Saint Paul's (VA) (1936), Florida A&M (1945–1969)
Bud Wilkinson^{†}	1947	1963	17	178	145	29	4	.826	Oklahoma (1947–1963)
Chuck Klausing^{†}	1964	1985	16	151	123	26	2	.821	Indiana (PA) (1964–1969), Carnegie Mellon (1976–1985)
Mike Kelly^{†}	1981	2007	27	301	246	54	1	.819	Dayton (1981–2007)
Henry Kean	1931	1954	23	208	165	34	9	.815	Kentucky State (1931–1942), Tennessee State (1944–1954)
Joe Fincham	1996	2021	25	255	224	51	0	.815	Wittenberg (1996–2021)
Joe Fusco^{†}	1972	1990	19	191	154	34	3	.814	Westminster (PA) (1972–1990)
Vernon McCain^{†}	1948	1963	16	126	100	21	5	.813	Maryland State (1948–1963)
Charlie Richard^{†}	1980	1994	14	152	123	28	1	.813	Baker (1980–1990, 1992–1994)
Jock Sutherland^{†}	1919	1938	20	186	144	28	14	.812	Lafayette (1919–1923), Pittsburgh (1924–1938)
Ron Schipper^{†}	1961	1996	36	357	287	67	3	.808	Central (IA) (1961–1996)
Mike Sirianni	2003	2025	23	241	202	49	0	.805	Washington & Jefferson (2003–present)
Nick Saban^{†}	1990	2023	28	364	292	71	1	.804 (Note: Saban's on-field record is 297–70–1 for a winning percentage of .808. Due to NCAA violations that began during the tenure of Saban's predecessor at Alabama, Mike Shula, that were not discovered until Saban's first season at the school in 2007, five wins from that season were vacated.)	Toledo (1990), Michigan State (1995–1999), LSU (2000–2004), Alabama (2007–2023)
Bob Devaney^{†}	1957	1972	16	173	136	30	7	.806	Wyoming (1957–1961), Nebraska (1962–1972)
Chuck Broyles	1990	2009	20	247	198	47	2	.806	Pittsburg State (1990–2009)
Biggie Munn^{†}	1935	1953	10	90	71	16	3	.806	Albright (1935–1936), Syracuse (1946), Michigan State (1947–1953)
Sid Gillman^{†}	1944	1954	10	102	81	19	2	.804	Miami (OH) (1944–1947), Cincinnati (1949–1954)
Mike Jacobs	2016	2025	10	117	94	23	0	.803	Notre Dame (OH) (2016–2019), Lenoir–Rhyne (2020–2023), Mercer (2024–2025), Toledo (2026–present)
Rick Willis	1997	2021	23	231	185	46	0	.801	Wartburg (1997–2021)
Mike Swider	1996	2019	24	261	209	52	0	.801	Wheaton (IL) (1996–2019)
Chad Braun	2015	2024	10	104	84	21	0	.800	Monmouth (2015–present)
Curt Cignetti	2011	2025	15	183	146	37	0	.798	IUP (2011–2016), Elon (2017–2018), James Madison (2019–2023), Indiana (2024–present)
John Thorne	2002	2014	13	148	118	30	0	.797	North Central (IL) (2002–2014)
Frank Thomas^{†}	1925	1946	19	183	141	33	9	.795	Chattanooga (1925–1928), Alabama (1931–1946)
Chris Petersen	2006	2019	14	185	147	38	0	.795	Boise State (2006–2013), Washington (2014–2019)
Harold Burry^{†}	1952	1971	20	163	127	31	5	.794	Westminster (PA) (1952–1971)
Bob Stoops^{†}	1999	2016	18	238	191	48	0	.798	Oklahoma (1999–2016, 2021)
Ted Kessinger^{†}	1976	2003	28	277	219	57	1	.792	Bethany (KS) (1976–2003)
Duke Greco	2014	2025	11	125	99	26	0	.792	Delaware Valley (2014–2023), West Chester (2024–present)
Matt Mitchell	2010	2022	13	148	117	31	0	.791	Grand Valley State (2010–2022)
John Tucker	1933	1947	12	103	77	17	9	.791	Arkansas Tech (1933–1947)
Allen H. Zikmund	1955	1971	17	155	121	31	3	.790	Nebraska–Kearney (1955–1971)
Mike Van Diest	1999	2018	20	257	203	54	0	.790	Carroll (MT) (1999–2018)
Pete Schmidt	1983	1996	14	135	105	27	3	.789	Albion (1983–1996)
Mike Drass	1993	2017	25	291	229	61	1	.789	Wesley (DE) (1993–2017)
Ad Rutschman^{†}	1968	1991	24	234	183	48	3	.788	Linfield (1968–1991)
Matt McCarty	2016	2025	10	122	96	26	0	.787	Northwestern (IA) (2016–present)
Tom Perkovich	2015	2025	10	118	83	25	0	.769	Susquehanna (2015–2025), Albany (2026–present)
Henry L. Williams^{†}	1891	1921	23	187	141	34	12	.786	Army (1891), Minnesota (1900–1921)
Norris Patterson	1950	1967	23	175	133	33	9	.786	William Jewell (1950–1967)
Gil Dobie^{†}	1906	1938	33	242	182	45	15	.783	North Dakota Agricultural (1906–1907), Washington (1908–1916), Navy (1917–1919), Cornell (1920–1935), Boston College (1936–1938)
John Wristen	2008	2022	14	169	133	37	0	.782	CSU Pueblo (2008–2022)
Bear Bryant^{†}	1945	1982	38	425	323	85	17	.780	Maryland (1945), Kentucky (1946–1953), Texas A&M (1954–1957), Alabama (1958–1982)
Jim Sochor^{†}	1970	1988	19	202	156	41	5	.780	UC Davis (1970–1988)
Dabo Swinney	2008	2025	18	240	187	53	0	.779	Clemson (2008–present)
Bill Edwards^{†}	1936	1968	23	221	168	45	8	.778	Western Reserve (1936–1940), Vanderbilt (1949–1952), Wittenberg (1955–1968)
Bo Schembechler^{†}	1963	1989	27	307	234	65	8	.775	Miami (OH) (1963–1968), Michigan (1969–1989)
John Gagliardi^{†}	1949	2012	64	638	489	138	11	.775	Carroll (MT) (1949–1952), Saint John's (MN) (1953–2012)
Rod Sandberg	2014	2025	12	119	92	27	0	.773	Whitworth (2014–present)
Fred Folsom	1895	1915	19	141	106	29	6	.773	Colorado (1895–1899, 1901–1902, 1908–1915), Dartmouth (1903–1906)
Ken Sparks	1980	2016	36	439	338	99	2	.772	Carson–Newman (1980–2016)
Roger Harring^{†}	1969	1999	31	343	261	75	7	.771	Wisconsin–La Crosse (1969–1999)
Clark Swisher	1946	1968	22	192	146	42	4	.771	Northern State (1946–1955, 1957–1968)
Bill Cronin	1997	2021	25	283	204	61	0	.770	Georgetown (KY) (1997–2021)
Glenn Caruso	2006	2025	19	221	170	51	0	.769	St. Thomas (MN) (2006–present)
Volney Ashford^{†}	1937	1967	31	264	197	55	12	.769	Missouri Valley (1937–1946)
Jim Purtill	1982	2013	16	170	130	39	1	.768	Salem (1982), St. Norbert (1999–2013)
Fritz Crisler^{†}	1930	1947	18	157	116	32	9	.768	Minnesota (1930–1931), Princeton (1932–1937), Michigan (1938–1947)
Bob Folwell	1909	1924	16	144	106	29	9	.767	Lafayette (1909–1911), Washington & Jefferson (1912–1915), Penn (1916–1919), Navy (1920–1924)
Jeff McMartin	2004	2025	22	223	171	52	0	.767	Central (IA) (2004–present)
Wallace Wade^{†}	1923	1950	24	230	171	49	10	.765	Alabama (1923–1930), Duke (1931–1941, 1946–1950)
Jimmie Keeling	1990	2010	21	225	172	53	0	.764	Hardin–Simmons (1990–2010)
Frank Kush^{†}	1958	1979	22	231	176	54	1	.764	Arizona State (1958–1979)
Jesse Burleson	2011	2025	15	152	116	36	0	.763	Hardin–Simmons (2011–present)
Gordon Kirkland	1934	1948	14	145	107	31	7	.762	Catawba (1934–1948)
Dan McGugin^{†}	1904	1934	30	271	197	55	19	.762	Vanderbilt (1904–1917, 1919–1934)
Jim Crowley^{†} (Note: Crowley was inducted into the College Football Hall of Fame in 1966 as a player in recognition of his career as a halfback at Notre Dame from 1922 to 1924.)	1929	1941	13	109	78	21	10	.761	Michigan State (1928–1932), Fordham (1933–1941)
Andy Smith^{†}	1909	1925	17	161	116	32	13	.761	Penn (1909–1912), Purdue (1913–1915), California (1916–1925)
John Luckhardt^{†}	1982	2011	27	297	225	70	2	.761	Washington & Jefferson (1982–1998), California (PA) (2002–2011)
Tony DeCarlo	1987	1998	12	131	90	27	4	.760	John Carroll (1987–1998)
Woody Hayes^{†}	1946	1978	33	320	238	72	10	.759	Denison (1946–1948), Miami (OH) (1949–1950), Ohio State (1951–1978)
Earl Blaik^{†}	1934	1958	25	228	166	48	14	.759	Dartmouth (1934–1940), Army (1941–1958)
Jim Clements	2006	2025	19	223	169	54	0	.758	Delaware Valley (2006–2013), Kutztown (2014–present)
John Merritt^{†}	1952	1983	32	321	237	72	12	.757	Jackson State (1952–1962), Tennessee State (1963–1983)
Ed Sherman^{†}	1945	1966	22	191	141	43	7	.757	Muskingum (1945–1966)
Chris Oliver	2010	2024	15	173	131	42	0	.757	Lindsey Wilson (2010–2021), Georgetown (KY) (2022–2024)
Charley Moran	1909	1933	18	168	121	35	12	.756	Texas A&M (1909–1914), Centre (1919–1923), Bucknell (1924–1926), Catawba (1930–1933)
Frosty Westering^{†}	1962	2003	40	406	303	96	7	.755	Parsons (IA) (1962–1963), Lea (1966–1971), Pacific Lutheran (1972–2003)
Curt Wiese	2006	2025	14	163	123	40	0	.755	Marietta (2006–2007), Minnesota–Duluth (2013–present)
Danny Hale^{†}	1984	2012	25	283	213	69	1	.754	West Chester (1984–1988), Bloomsburg (1993–2012)
Lloyd Carr^{†}	1995	2007	13	162	122	40	0	.753	Michigan (1995–2007)
Earl Banks^{†}	1960	1973	14	129	96	31	2	.752	Morgan State (1960–1973)
Jerome Berg	1956	1966	11	84	62	20	2	.750	Mayville State (1956–1966)
Allyn McKeen^{†}	1937	1948	11	106	78	25	3	.750	West Tennessee State (1937–1938), Mississippi State (1939–1948)
Richard Peters	1949	1971	19	174	129	42	3	.750	Ottawa (KS) (1949–1952, 1957–1971)

Note: As of the end of the 2010 season, Jim Tressel, who served as the head football coach for Youngstown State (1986–2000) and Ohio State (2001–2010), had a career record of 241–79–2 for a winning percentage of .752. In July 2011, Ohio State vacated all 12 of its wins from the 2010 season, dropping Tressel's career record to 229–79–2 and his winning percentage to .742.

== Active coaches near a .750 winning percentage ==
This list identifies active coaches who have:
- a winning percentage of .735 or greater after at least 10 full seasons as a college football head coach, or
- a winning percentage of .750 or greater after at least 7 full seasons, but fewer than 10, as a college football head coach.
Updated through end of 2025 season.

Name	First year	Last year	Years	Games	Wins	Losses	Ties	Win %	Teams
Joe Woodley	2019	2025	7	91	80	9	0	.899	Grand View (2019–2024), Drake (2025)
Ryan Day	2019	2025	8	92	82	12	0	.872	Ohio State (2019–present)
Paul Simmons	2017	2025	8	108	92	16	0	.852	Harding (2017–present)
James Miller	2017	2024	8	90	71	19	0	.789	Reinhardt (2017–present)
Peter Stuursma	2016	2025	9	94	74	20	0	.787	Hope (2016–present)
Shawn Lutz	2016	2025	9	113	88	25	0	.779	Slippery Rock (2016–present)
Lincoln Riley	2017	2025	9	118	90	28	0	.763	Oklahoma (2017–2021), USC (2022–present)
Ernie McCook	2018	2025	8	88	66	22	0	.750	Shepherd (2018–present)
Todd Hoffner	1999	2025	22	263	194	69	0	.738	Wisconsin–Eau Claire (1999–2005), Minnesota State (2008–2011, 2014–present)

== College football coaches with an .850 winning percentage ==
The main list set forth above is limited to coaches with 10 years of experience as a head coach. This list supplements the main list by identifying coaches who are omitted from the main list because they have not coached 10 years, but who have achieved a winning percentage of .850 or higher while coaching a minimum of five seasons or 50 games.

List may be incomplete; updated through end of 2025 season.

Name	First year	Last year	Years	Games	Wins	Losses	Ties	Win %	Teams
Vince Kehres	2013	2019	7	101	95	6	0	.941	Mount Union (2013–2019)
Geoff Dartt	2020	2025	6	72	67	5	0	.931	Mount Union (2020–present)
Walter Camp	1888	1895	7	87	79	5	3	.925	Yale (1888–1892), Stanford (1892, 1894–1895)
Robert B. Redman	1947	1951	5	42	38	4	0	.905	Bloomsburg (1947–1951)
Charles Tambling	1902	1918	5	20	18	2	0	.900	Central Michigan (1902–1905, 1918)
Joe Woodley	2019	2025	7	91	80	9	0	.899	Grand View (2019–2024), Drake (2025–present)
Samuel Archer	1905	1915	8	42	35	2	5	.893	Morehouse (1905–1908, 1912–1915)
Ron Erhardt	1966	1972	7	69	61	7	1	.891	North Dakota State (1966–1972)
Ryan Day	2018	2025	8	92	92	12	0	.872	Ohio State (2018–present)
Jeff Thorne	2015	2021	6	76	66	10	0	.868	North Central (IL) (2015–2021)
Jay Cottone	1981	1985	5	53	46	7	0	.868	Plymouth State (1981–1985)
Kevin Bullis	2015	2022	8	91	78	13	0	.857	Wisconsin–Whitewater (2015–2022)
Walter C. Booth	1900	1905	6	63	53	8	2	.857	Nebraska (1900–1905)
John Macklin	1911	1915	5	34	29	5	0	.853	Michigan State (1911–1915)
Brett Dietz	2020	2025	6	60	51	9	0	.850	DePauw (2020–present)

== See also ==
- List of college football career coaching wins leaders
- List of college football career coaching losses leaders
- List of college football seasons coached leaders
