= Caleb Murphy =

American football player (born 1999)

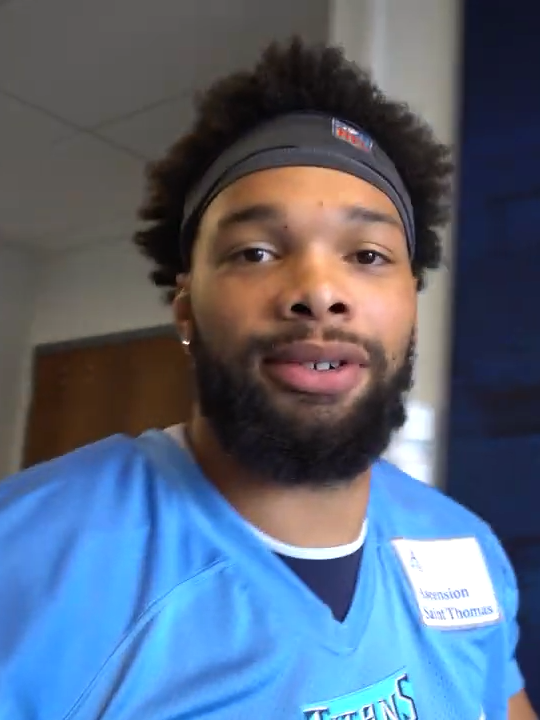
- Murphy with the Tennessee Titans in 2023

No. 50 – Los Angeles Chargers
- Position: Outside linebacker
- Roster status: Active

Personal information
- Born: December 15, 1999 (age 26); Dowagiac, Michigan, U.S.
- Listed height: 6 ft 3 in (1.91 m)
- Listed weight: 254 lb (115 kg)

Career information
- High school: Dowagiac Union
- College: Grand Valley State (2018–2019); Ferris State (2020–2022)
- NFL draft: 2023: undrafted

Career history
- Tennessee Titans (2023–2024); Los Angeles Chargers (2024–2025); New England Patriots (2025); New York Giants (2025–2026)*; Los Angeles Chargers (2026–present)
- * Offseason or practice squad member only

Awards and highlights
- 2× Division II national champion (2021, 2022); Ted Hendricks Award (2022); Cliff Harris Award (2022); Gene Upshaw Award (2022); GLIAC Player of the Year (2022); GLIAC Defensive Lineman of the Year (2021); 2× First-team All-GLIAC (2021, 2022)

Career NFL statistics as of Week 4, 2026
- Total tackles: 19
- Sacks: 0.5
- Stats at Pro Football Reference

Caleb Murphy (born December 15, 1999) is an American professional football outside linebacker for the Los Angeles Chargers of the National Football League (NFL). He played college football for the Grand Valley State Lakers before transferring to the Ferris State Bulldogs.

== Early life ==
Murphy grew up in Dowagiac, Michigan and attended Dowagiac Union High School, where he was a member of the football, basketball, wrestling, baseball, and track and field teams. He was named first team All-State as a junior after recording 86 tackles with 17 tackles for loss and 15 sacks. Murphy repeated as a first team All-State selection during his senior year after making 97 tackles with 27 tackles for loss and 13 sacks.

== College career ==
Murphy began his college career at Grand Valley State and redshirted his true freshman season. He had 13 tackles and one sack in eight games in 2019. Murphy transferred to Ferris State after his redshirt freshman year. His first season at Ferris State was cancelled due to the COVID-19 pandemic. Murphy was named the Great Lakes Intercollegiate Athletic Conference (GLIAC) Defensive Lineman of the Year and first team All-GLIAC after finishing the 2021 season with 63 tackles, 14.5 sacks, 21.5 tackles for loss, and five forced fumbles as the Bulldogs won the 2021 NCAA Division II Football Championship Game.

As a senior, Murphy set the NCAA single-season record with 25.5 sacks and also tied the NCAA record with 39 tackles for loss while Ferris State repeated as national champions. At the end of the season, Murphy became the first non-FBS player to win the Ted Hendricks Award as the nation's best defensive end. He was also named the GLIAC Player of the Year and won the Gene Upshaw Award as the best lineman in NCAA Division II and the Cliff Harris Award as the nation's best small college defensive player.

== Professional career ==
Pre-draft measurables
Height	Weight	Arm length	Hand span	Wingspan	40-yard dash	10-yard split	20-yard split	20-yard shuttle	Three-cone drill	Vertical jump	Broad jump	Bench press
6 ft 3 1/4 in (1.91 m)	254 lb (115 kg)	32 3/4 in (0.83 m)	10 1/4 in (0.26 m)	6 ft 7 1/4 in (2.01 m)	4.81 s	1.65 s	2.79 s	4.45 s	7.28 s	31.0 in (0.79 m)	9 ft 11 in (3.02 m)	17 reps
All values from NFL Combine/Pro Day

=== Tennessee Titans ===
Murphy was signed by the Tennessee Titans as an undrafted free agent on April 29, 2023, shortly after the conclusion of the 2023 NFL draft.

Murphy played five games during the 2023 and 2024 seasons. He was waived by the Titans on October 26, 2024.

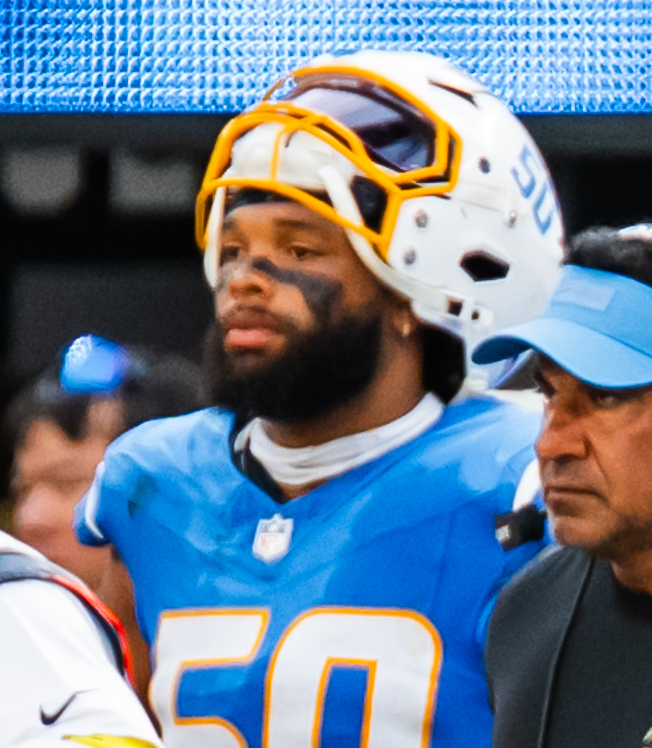
Murphy in 2025

=== Los Angeles Chargers (first stint) ===
On October 30, 2024, Murphy was signed to the Los Angeles Chargers practice squad. He signed a reserve/future contract with Los Angeles on January 13, 2025. In six appearances for the Chargers, Murphy recorded half of a sack and 12 combined tackles. On October 18, Murphy was waived by the Chargers.

=== New England Patriots ===
On October 20, 2025, Murphy was claimed off waivers by the New England Patriots. He was waived by New England on December 15.

=== New York Giants ===
On December 16, 2025, Murphy was claimed off waivers by the New York Giants.

On March 10, 2026, Murphy signed a reserve/futures contract with the Giants. On August 30, Murphy was waived by the Giants as a part of final roster cuts.

=== Los Angeles Chargers (second stint) ===
On September 3, 2026, Murphy signed with the Los Angeles Chargers' practice squad. On October 17, he was signed to the active roster.
