= Jared Bernhardt =

American football player (born 1997)

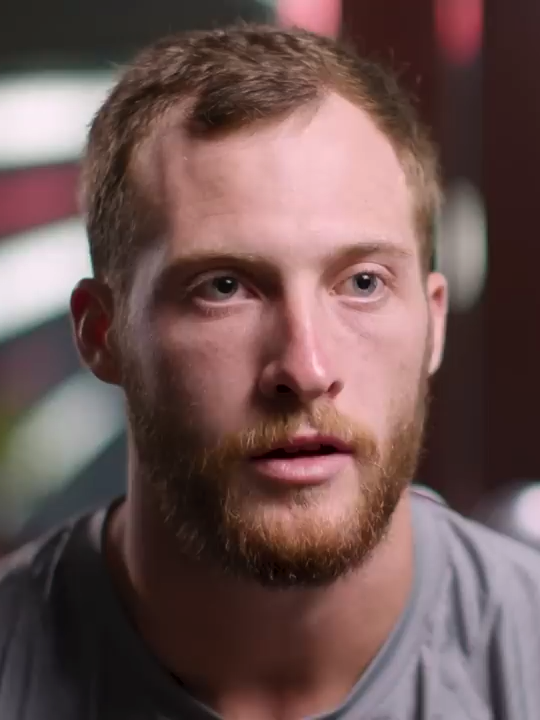
- Bernhardt in 2022

Personal information
- Nationality: American
- Born: September 12, 1997 (age 29) Longwood, Florida, U.S.
- Height: 6 ft 1 in (185 cm)
- Weight: 195 lb (88 kg; 13 st 13 lb)

Sport
- Position: Attack
- Shoots: Right
- NCAA team: Maryland (2017–2021)
- PLL team: Denver Outlaws

Career highlights
- PLL First Team All-Pro (2025); 2017 NCAA Division I Men's Lacrosse title; 2021 Lt. Raymond Enners Award; 2021 Tewaaraton Award

Jared Bernhardt
No. 88
- Position: Wide receiver

Personal information
- Listed height: 6 ft 1 in (1.85 m)
- Listed weight: 195 lb (88 kg)

Career information
- High school: Lake Brantley (Altamonte Springs, Florida)
- College: Ferris State (2021)
- NFL draft: 2022: undrafted

Career history
- Atlanta Falcons (2022); BC Lions (2024)*
- * Offseason or practice squad member only

Awards and highlights
- NCAA Division II national champion (2021); GLIAC Player of the Year (2021); First-team All-GLIAC (2021)
- Stats at Pro Football Reference

Jared Bernhardt (born September 12, 1997) is an American professional lacrosse attackman for the Denver Outlaws and former professional football wide receiver. He previously played college lacrosse at Maryland where he won the Tewaaraton Award as the nation's best player followed by one season of college football as quarterback at Ferris State. He is currently also the director of player development for the University of Maryland men's lacrosse team.

== Early life ==
Bernhardt grew up in Longwood, Florida. His father, Jim, was a football coach at Hofstra, Brown, Central Florida, and Penn State and was the director of football research for the Houston Texans. Bernhardt attended Lake Brantley High School, where he played football and lacrosse. In football, he played quarterback in a triple-option offense and rushed 1,457 yards and 12 touchdowns and passed for 751 yards and six touchdowns in 11 games as a senior. Bernhardt was an All-American midfielder in lacrosse at Lake Brantley and committed to play collegiately at the University of Maryland as a sophomore.

== College career ==
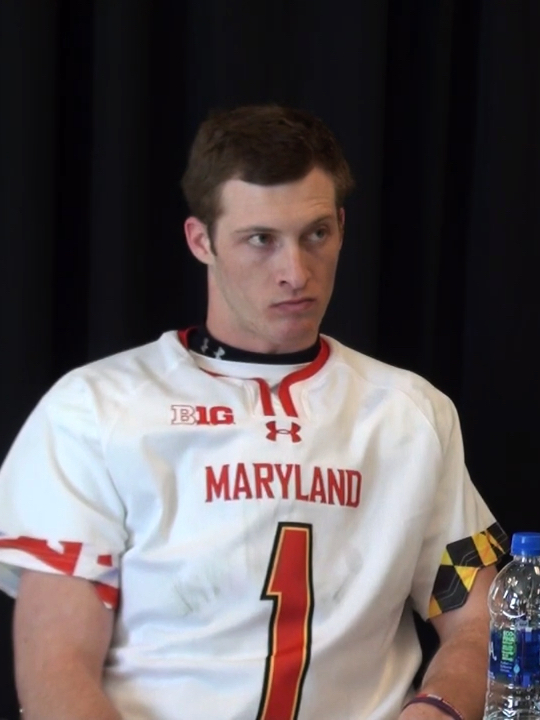
Bernhardt with Maryland in 2019

Bernhardt was a member of the Maryland Terrapins men's lacrosse team for five seasons. As a freshman, he was a starting midfielder on the Terrapins' 2017 national championship team. His senior season was canceled after six games due to COVID-19. Bernhardt returned for a fifth season and won the Tewaaraton Award as the nation's best collegiate lacrosse player. He left Maryland as the school's career leader in goals with 202 and points with 290.

Following the death of his father in 2019, Bernhardt decided that he would utilize the NCAA's "five to play four" rule, which allows athletes one year of eligibility in another sport after they have exhausted eligibility in their primary sport, and play college football. He committed to play quarterback at Ferris State for the 2020 season, but the Division II football season was canceled due to COVID-19 and he stayed at Maryland for an additional season of lacrosse. Bernhardt enrolled at Ferris State as a graduate transfer in the summer of 2021 and was named the team's starting quarterback. In his only season of college football, Bernhardt passed for 1,322 yards and 11 touchdowns while rushing for 1,421 yards and 26 touchdowns and was named the Great Lakes Intercollegiate Athletic Conference Player of the Year as the Bulldogs went 14–0 and won the 2021 NCAA Division II Football Championship Game. In the game, he didn't attempt a pass and rushed 14 times for 148 yards and three touchdowns in the 58–17 win over Valdosta State.

== Professional football career ==
Pre-draft measurables
Height	Weight	Arm length	Hand span	40-yard dash	10-yard split	20-yard split	20-yard shuttle	Three-cone drill	Vertical jump	Broad jump	Bench press
6 ft 1 1/8 in (1.86 m)	189 lb (86 kg)	31 1/4 in (0.79 m)	8 3/8 in (0.21 m)	4.71 s	1.61 s	2.70 s	4.21 s	6.90 s	32.0 in (0.81 m)	9 ft 10 in (3.00 m)	6 reps
All values from Pro Day

Bernhardt participated in Maryland's pro day on March 30, 2022. On April 7, 2022, Bernhardt visited the Denver Broncos for a top-30 visit.

=== Atlanta Falcons ===
Bernhardt was signed by the Atlanta Falcons as an undrafted free agent on April 30, 2022, shortly after the conclusion of the 2022 NFL draft. He made the Falcons' initial 53-man roster out of training camp. The highlight of that season was a game winning touchdown catch against the Detroit Lions during the preseason. On October 22, Bernhardt was placed on injured reserve with a groin injury.

Bernhardt announced his retirement from the NFL on May 22, 2023.

=== BC Lions ===
On September 23, 2024, Bernhardt ended his retirement by signing with the BC Lions of the Canadian Football League (CFL), and joining their practice roster. On May 14, 2025, Bernhardt was released by the Lions.

== Coaching career ==
On August 31, 2023, the University of Maryland men's lacrosse head coach John Tillman announced they had hired Bernhardt to be the programs director of player development for the University of Maryland lacrosse team. He joined a coaching staff that consisted of his two brothers, Jake and Jesse Bernhardt, although Jake would leave the position to become the head coach at Colby College.

== Professional lacrosse career ==
Bernhardt signed with the Denver Outlaws on June 3, 2025.
