= NCAA Division II football championship =

American college football tournament

- Current season, competition or edition: 2026 NCAA Division II football season
- Sport: American football
- Founded: 1973; 53 years ago
- First season: 1973
- No. of teams: 32
- Country: United States
- Most recent champion: Ferris State (2025)
- Most titles: Northwest Missouri State (6 titles)
- Broadcaster: ESPN2
- Level on pyramid: 2
- Related competitions: Division III
- Website: ncaa.com/football/d2

The NCAA Division II football championship is an American college football tournament that is played annually to determine a champion at the NCAA Division II level. It was first held in 1973, as a single-elimination playoff with only eight teams. The tournament field has subsequently been expanded over the years four times: to 16 teams in 1988, 24 teams in 2004, 28 teams in 2016, and 32 teams in 2025.

The national championship game has been held in eight cities. Former sites include Sacramento, California (1973–1975); Wichita Falls, Texas (1976–1977); Longview, Texas (1978); Albuquerque, New Mexico (1979–1980); McAllen, Texas (1981–1985); Florence, Alabama (1986–2013); and Kansas City, Kansas (2014–2017). From 1973 through 1985 (with the exception of 1978) the championship game carried a bowl designation (see NCAA Division II bowl games).

Since 2018, the championship game has been played at the McKinney ISD Stadium and Community Event Center in McKinney, Texas. Since 1994, the games have been broadcast on ESPN.

== Small-college wire service national champions ==
Prior to 1973, for what was then called the NCAA College Division, national champions were selected by polls conducted at the end of each regular season by two major wire services, the Associated Press (AP) and United Press International (UPI). In five years, the two polls named different number one teams. From 1964 to 1972, postseason bowl games crowned four regional champions. NCAA Division II bowl games still exist, but only as postseason contests for teams not qualifying for the championship playoffs.

Polls to rank "small college" football teams were conducted by the Associated Press (AP) and United Press International (UPI) during and at the end of each regular season. The AP polled a panel of experts, while UPI polled a panel of coaches. When UPI began its poll in 1958, it explained that the poll would cover college football programs not considered "major" by the Football Writers Association of America (FWAA), with the small schools (then numbering 519) belonging to the NCAA, the NAIA, both, or neither. The AP began its poll in 1960.

=== National champions per wire service polls ===
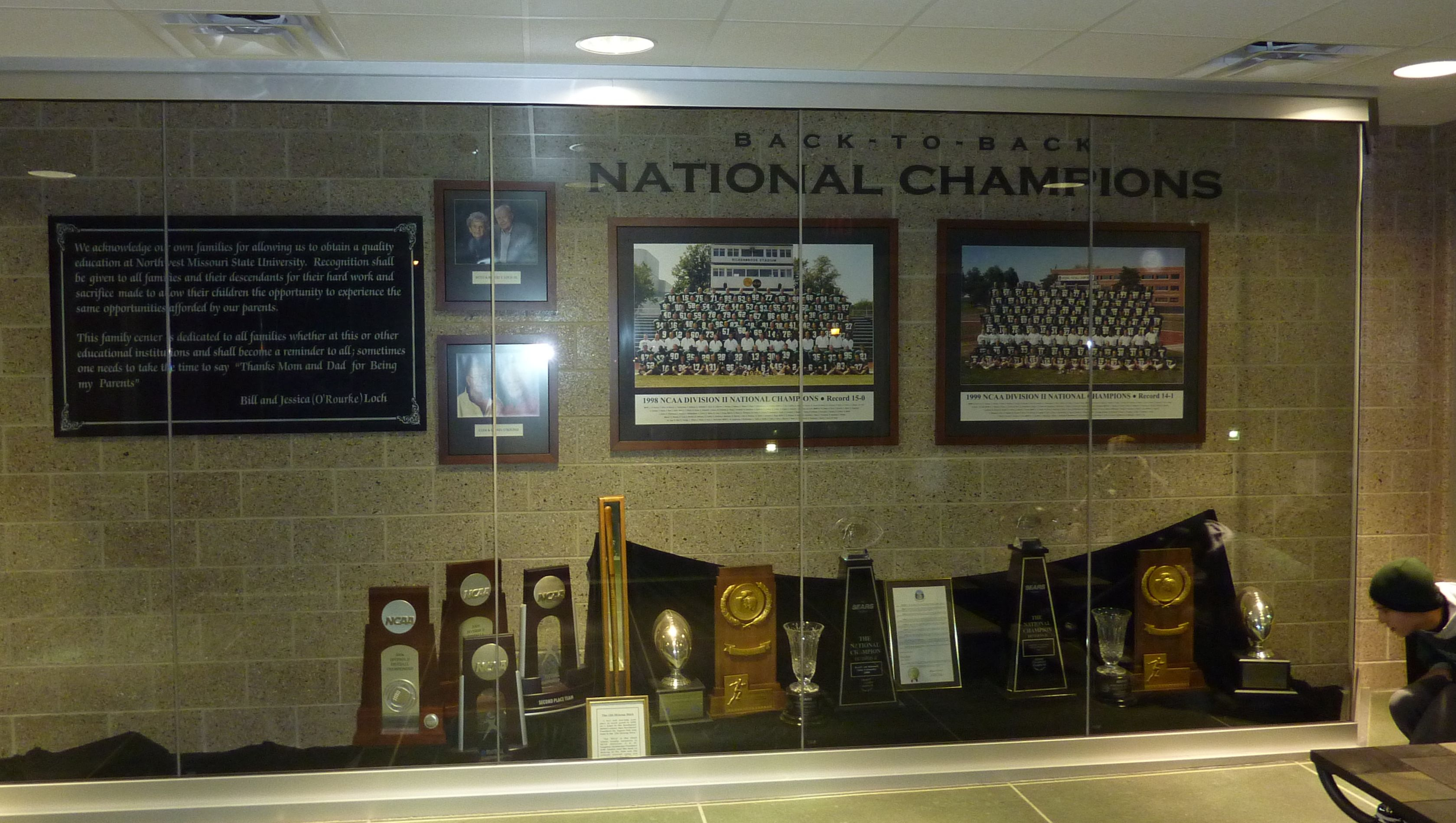
National football championship trophy room at Bearcat Stadium at Northwest Missouri State University. The two trophies in the middle are for the team's 1998 and 1999 national championships. The four trophies on the left are for appearances in the 2005–2008 title games

Year	Top-ranked team	
Year	per UPI poll	per AP poll
1958	Mississippi Southern	(no poll)
1959	Bowling Green	(no poll)
1960	Ohio	
1961	Pittsburg State	
1962	Southern Miss	Florida A&M
1963	Delaware	Northern Illinois
1964	Cal State Los Angeles	Wittenberg
1965	North Dakota State	
1966	San Diego State	
1967	San Diego State	
1968	San Diego State	North Dakota State
1969	North Dakota State	
1970	Arkansas State	
1971	Delaware	
1972	Delaware	
1973 (Note: While the NCAA started Division II playoffs in 1973, AP and UPI still conducted their polls during the 1973 and 1974 seasons.)	Tennessee State	
1974	Louisiana Tech	Central Michigan

== NCAA Division II champions ==
Since 1973, a post-season tournament has been held to determine the Division II Champion. The current format, in use since 2025, features 32 teams organized into 4 super-regions of 8 teams each. Prior to the championship game, all contests are hosted by the higher-seeded team. the semi-final games are held at the home stadiums of the two highest-seeded remaining teams. Since 2018, the championship game has been played at the McKinney Independent School District Stadium, a 12,000 seat facility that opened in August 2018.

=== Results ===
Key

- (OT) – game went to overtime

Ed.	Season	Champion	Score	Runner-up	Venue	Location	Att.	Winning head coach
1	1973	Louisiana Tech (1)	34–0	Western Kentucky	Hughes Stadium	Sacramento, CA	12,016	Maxie Lambright
2	1974	Central Michigan (1)	54–14	Delaware	Hughes Stadium	Sacramento, CA	14,137	Roy Kramer
3	1975	Northern Michigan (1)	16–14	Western Kentucky	Hughes Stadium	Sacramento, CA	12,017	Gil Krueger
4	1976	Montana State (1)	24–13	Akron	Memorial Stadium	Wichita Falls, TX	13,200	Sonny Holland
5	1977	Lehigh (1)	33–0	Jacksonville State	Memorial Stadium	Wichita Falls, TX	14,114	John Whitehead
6	1978	Eastern Illinois (1)	10–9	Delaware	Lobo Stadium	Longview, TX	5,500	Darrell Mudra
7	1979	Delaware (1)	38–21	Youngstown State	University Stadium	Albuquerque, NM	4,000	Tubby Raymond
8	1980	Cal Poly (1)	21–13	Eastern Illinois	University Stadium	Albuquerque, NM	2,056	Joe Harper
9	1981	Southwest Texas (1)	42–13	North Dakota State	McAllen Stadium	McAllen, TX	9,415	Jim Wacker
10	1982	Southwest Texas (2)	34–9	UC Davis	McAllen Stadium	McAllen, TX	8,000	Jim Wacker
11	1983	North Dakota State (1)	41–21	Central State	McAllen Stadium	McAllen, TX	5,275	Don Morton
12	1984	Troy State (1)	18–17	North Dakota State	McAllen Stadium	McAllen, TX	4,500	Chan Gailey
13	1985	North Dakota State (2)	35–7	North Alabama	McAllen Stadium	McAllen, TX	6,000	Earle Solomonson
14	1986	North Dakota State (3)	27–7	South Dakota	Braly Stadium	Florence, AL	11,506	Earle Solomonson
15	1987	Troy State (2)	31–17	Portland State	Braly Stadium	Florence, AL	10,660	Rick Rhoades
16	1988	North Dakota State (4)	35–21	Portland State	Braly Stadium	Florence, AL	6,763	Rocky Hager
17	1989	Mississippi College (Note: Mississippi College's 1989 tournament participation, along with its championship, were vacated by the NCAA Committee on Infractions.)	3–0	Jacksonville State	Braly Stadium	Florence, AL	10,538	John M. Williams
18	1990	North Dakota State (5)	51–11	Indiana (PA)	Braly Stadium	Florence, AL	10,080	Rocky Hager
19	1991	Pittsburg State (1)	23–6	Jacksonville State	Braly Stadium	Florence, AL	11,682	Chuck Broyles
20	1992	Jacksonville State (1)	17–13	Pittsburg State	Braly Stadium	Florence, AL	11,733	Bill Burgess
21	1993	North Alabama (1)	41–34	Indiana (PA)	Braly Stadium	Florence, AL	15,631	Bobby Wallace
22	1994	North Alabama (2)	16–10	Texas A&M–Kingsville	Braly Stadium	Florence, AL	13,526	Bobby Wallace
23	1995	North Alabama (3)	27–7	Pittsburg State	Braly Stadium	Florence, AL	15,241	Bobby Wallace
24	1996	Northern Colorado (1)	23–14	Carson–Newman	Braly Stadium	Florence, AL	5,745	Joe Glenn
25	1997	Northern Colorado (2)	51–0	New Haven	Braly Stadium	Florence, AL	3,352	Joe Glenn
26	1998	Northwest Missouri (1)	24–6	Carson–Newman	Braly Stadium	Florence, AL	6,149	Mel Tjeerdsma
27	1999	Northwest Missouri (2)	58–52 (OT)	Carson–Newman	Braly Stadium	Florence, AL	8,451	Mel Tjeerdsma
28	2000	Delta State (1)	63–34	Bloomsburg	Braly Stadium	Florence, AL	7,123	Steve Campbell
29	2001	North Dakota (1)	17–14	Grand Valley State	Braly Stadium	Florence, AL	6,113	Dale Lennon
30	2002	Grand Valley State (1)	31–24	Valdosta State	Braly Stadium	Florence, AL	9,783	Brian Kelly
31	2003	Grand Valley State (2)	10–3	North Dakota	Braly Stadium	Florence, AL	7,236	Brian Kelly
32	2004	Valdosta State (1)	36–31	Pittsburg State	Braly Stadium	Florence, AL	8,604	Chris Hatcher
33	2005	Grand Valley State (3)	21–17	Northwest Missouri	Braly Stadium	Florence, AL	6,837	Chuck Martin
34	2006	Grand Valley State (4)	17–14	Northwest Missouri	Braly Stadium	Florence, AL	7,437	Chuck Martin
35	2007	Valdosta State (2)	25–20	Northwest Missouri	Braly Stadium	Florence, AL	7,532	David Dean
36	2008	Minnesota–Duluth (1)	21–14	Northwest Missouri	Braly Stadium	Florence, AL	6,215	Bob Nielson
37	2009	Northwest Missouri (3)	30–23	Grand Valley State	Braly Stadium	Florence, AL	6,211	Mel Tjeerdsma
38	2010	Minnesota–Duluth (2)	20–17	Delta State	Braly Stadium	Florence, AL	4,027	Bob Nielson
39	2011	Pittsburg State (2)	35–21	Wayne State (MI)	Braly Stadium	Florence, AL	7,276	Tim Beck
40	2012	Valdosta State (3)	35–7	Winston-Salem State	Braly Stadium	Florence, AL	7,525	David Dean
41	2013	Northwest Missouri (4)	43–28	Lenoir–Rhyne	Braly Stadium	Florence, AL	6,543	Adam Dorrel
42	2014	CSU Pueblo (1)	13–0	Minnesota State	Children's Mercy	Kansas City, KS	6,762	John Wristen
43	2015	Northwest Missouri (5)	34–7	Shepherd	Children's Mercy	Kansas City, KS	16,181	Adam Dorrel
44	2016	Northwest Missouri (6)	29–3	North Alabama	Children's Mercy	Kansas City, KS	9,576	Adam Dorrel
45	2017	Texas A&M–Commerce (1)	37–27	West Florida	Children's Mercy	Kansas City, KS	4,259	Colby Carthel
46	2018	Valdosta State (4)	49–47	Ferris State	McKinney Stadium	McKinney, TX	4,306	Kerwin Bell
47	2019	West Florida (1)	48–40	Minnesota State	McKinney Stadium	McKinney, TX	3,415	Pete Shinnick
–	2020	(canceled due to the COVID-19 pandemic)						
48	2021	Ferris State (1)	58–17	Valdosta State	McKinney Stadium	McKinney, TX	3,933	Tony Annese
49	2022	Ferris State (2)	41–14	Colorado Mines	McKinney Stadium	McKinney, TX	6,333	Tony Annese
50	2023	Harding (1)	38–7	Colorado Mines	McKinney Stadium	McKinney, TX	12,552	Paul Simmons
51	2024	Ferris State (3)	49–14	Valdosta State	McKinney Stadium	McKinney, TX	3,228	Tony Annese
52	2025	Ferris State (4)	42–21	Harding	McKinney Stadium	McKinney, TX	10,521	Tony Annese
53	2026							
54	2027							

=== Team titles ===
Current Division II members
Team	#	Years
Northwest Missouri State	6	1998, 1999, 2009, 2013, 2015, 2016
Grand Valley State	4	2002, 2003, 2005, 2006
Valdosta State	4	2004, 2007, 2012, 2018
Ferris State	4	2021, 2022, 2024, 2025
Minnesota Duluth	2	2008, 2010
Pittsburg State	2	1991, 2011
CSU Pueblo	1	2014
Delta State	1	2000
Harding	1	2023
Northern Michigan	1	1975

Former Division II members
Team	#	Years
North Dakota State	5	1983, 1985, 1986, 1988, 1990
North Alabama	3	1993, 1994, 1995
Northern Colorado	2	1996, 1997
Texas State	2	1981, 1982
Troy	2	1984, 1987
Cal Poly	1	1980
Central Michigan	1	1974
Delaware	1	1979
Eastern Illinois	1	1978
Jacksonville State	1	1992
Lehigh	1	1977
Louisiana Tech	1	1973
Montana State	1	1976
North Dakota	1	2001
East Texas A&M	1	2017
West Florida	1	2019
Mississippi College	0	~~1989~~

=== Map ===
Schools with national championships
– 6 championships, – 5 championships, – 4 championships, – 3 championships
– 2 championships, – 1 championship

== Championship game appearances ==
Programs that no longer compete in Division II are indicated in italics.

Team	App.	Years
Northwest Missouri State	10	1998, 1999, 2005, 2006, 2007, 2008, 2009, 2013, 2015, 2016
Valdosta State	7	2002, 2004, 2007, 2012, 2018, 2021, 2024
North Dakota State	7	1981, 1983, 1984, 1985, 1986, 1988, 1990
Grand Valley State	6	2001, 2002, 2003, 2005, 2006, 2009
Ferris State	5	2018, 2021, 2022, 2024, 2025
North Alabama	5	1985, 1993, 1994, 1995, 2016
Pittsburg State	5	1991, 1992, 1995, 2004, 2011
Jacksonville State	4	1977, 1989, 1991, 1992
Carson–Newman	3	1996, 1998, 1999
Delaware	3	1974, 1978, 1979
Harding	2	2023, 2025
Colorado Mines	2	2022, 2023
Delta State	2	2000, 2010
Eastern Illinois	2	1978, 1980
Indiana (PA)	2	1990, 1993
Minnesota–Duluth	2	2008, 2010
Minnesota State	2	2014, 2019
North Dakota	2	2001, 2003
Northern Colorado	2	1996, 1997
Portland State	2	1987, 1988
Texas State^{[a]}	2	1981, 1982
Troy^{[b]}	2	1984, 1987
Western Kentucky	2	1973, 1975
West Florida	2	2017, 2019
Akron	1	1976
Bloomsburg	1	2000
Cal Poly	1	1980
Central Michigan	1	1974
Central State	1	1983
CSU Pueblo	1	2014
East Texas A&M^{[c]}	1	2017
Lehigh	1	1977
Lenoir–Rhyne	1	2013
Louisiana Tech	1	1973
Montana State	1	1976
New Haven	1	1997
Northern Michigan	1	1975
Shepherd	1	2015
South Dakota	1	1986
Texas A&M–Kingsville	1	1994
UC Davis	1	1982
Wayne State (MI)	1	2011
Winston-Salem State	1	2012
Youngstown State	1	1979
Mississippi Christian^{[d]}	0	~~1989~~†

Of the programs that no longer compete in D-II, Akron, Central Michigan, Delaware, Jacksonville State, Louisiana Tech, North Dakota State, Texas State, Troy and Western Kentucky currently compete in Division I FBS, while Mississippi College no longer fields a football team. All others compete in Division I FCS.

=== Notes ===
† Mississippi College's 1989 tournament participation, along with its championship, were vacated by the NCAA Committee on Infractions.

- ^{a} During Texas State's entire tenure in Division II, its name was Southwest Texas State University. The school adopted its current name in 2003.
- ^{b} During Troy's entire tenure in Division II, its name was Troy State University. The school adopted its current name in 2005.
- ^{c} East Texas A&M was known by two names during its Division II tenure—first as East Texas State University through the 1995 season, then as Texas A&M University–Commerce. The school adopted its current name in 2024.
- ^{d} Mississippi Christian was known as Mississippi College when it fielded a football team.

== Teams that moved to Division I ==
Most of the participants in early national championship games have moved into Division I, the main catalyst for their moves being the creation of Division I-AA, now the Division I Football Championship Subdivision (FCS), in 1978. The following Division II title game participants later moved to Division I:

Division I FBS (formerly I-A)

- Akron (1976 runner-up)
- Central Michigan (1974 champion)
- Delaware (1979 champion; 1974 and 1978 runner-up)
- Jacksonville State (1992 champion; 1977, 1989, and 1991 runner-up)
- Louisiana Tech (1973 champion)
- North Dakota State (1965, 1968, 1969, 1983, 1985, 1986, 1988, and 1990 champion; 1981 and 1984 runner-up)
- Texas State (1981 and 1982 champion as Southwest Texas State)
- Troy (1984 and 1987 champion as Troy State)
- Western Kentucky (1973 and 1975 runner-up)

Division I FCS (formerly I-AA)

- Cal Poly (1980 champion)
- East Texas A&M (2017 champion as Texas A&M–Commerce)
- Eastern Illinois (1978 champion; 1980 runner-up)
- Lehigh (1977 champion)
- Montana State (1976 champion)
- New Haven (1997 runner-up)
- North Alabama (1993, 1994, and 1995 champion; 1985 and 2016 runner-up)
- North Dakota (2001 champion, 2003 runner-up)
- Northern Colorado (1996 and 1997 champion)
- Portland State (1987 and 1988 runner-up)
- South Dakota (1986 runner-up)
- UC Davis (1982 runner-up)
- Youngstown State (1979 runner-up)

== Postseason bowls ==
=== Regional bowls ===
From 1964 to 1972, four regional bowl games were played in order to provide postseason action, however these games took place after the AP and UPI polls were completed, therefore these games did not factor in selecting a national champion for the College Division. The bowl games were:

Region	1964	1965	1966	1967	1968	1969	1970	1971	1972
East	Tangerine Bowl				Boardwalk Bowl				
East	Orlando, Florida				Atlantic City, New Jersey				
Mideast	Grantland Rice Bowl								
Mideast	Murfreesboro, Tennessee					Baton Rouge, Louisiana			
Midwest	Pecan Bowl							Pioneer Bowl	
Midwest	Abilene, Texas				Arlington, Texas			Wichita Falls, Texas	
West	Camellia Bowl								
West	Sacramento, California								

Winners of regional bowls

Year	West	Midwest	Mideast	East
1964	Montana State	State College of Iowa	Middle Tennessee	East Carolina
1965	Cal State Los Angeles	North Dakota State	Ball State / Tennessee A&I (tie)	East Carolina
1966	San Diego State	North Dakota	Tennessee A&I	Morgan State
1967	San Diego State	Texas–Arlington	Eastern Kentucky	Tennessee–Martin
1968	Humboldt State	North Dakota State	Louisiana Tech	Delaware
1969	North Dakota State	Arkansas State	East Tennessee State	Delaware
1970	North Dakota State	Arkansas State	Tennessee State	Delaware
1971	Boise State	Louisiana Tech	Tennessee State	Delaware
1972	North Dakota State	Tennessee State	Louisiana Tech	UMass

=== Playoff bowls ===
From 1973 to 1977, some of the tournament games were also known by bowl names;

- In 1973, one of the first-round games was the final playing of the Boardwalk Bowl.
- From 1973 through 1975, the two semifinal games were the Grantland Rice Bowl and the Pioneer Bowl, while the final game was the Camellia Bowl.
- In 1976 and 1977, the two semifinal games were the Grantland Rice Bowl and the Knute Rockne Bowl, while the final game was the Pioneer Bowl.
