= Ted Hendricks Award =

College football award

- Awarded for: The top defensive end in college football
- Country: United States
- Presented by: Ted Hendricks Foundation

History
- First award: 2002
- Most recent: Rueben Bain Jr., Miami (FL) (2025)
- Website: tedhendricks.com/award.htm

The Ted Hendricks Award is given annually to college football's top defensive end. The award is named after Ted Hendricks, a member of both the College Football Hall of Fame and Pro Football Hall of Fame, and is presented by his own foundation. In 2022, Caleb Murphy, of NCAA Division II Ferris State University, became the first non-FBS player to win the award. The most recent recipient of the award was Rueben Bain Jr. from Miami (FL).

== Winners ==
Year	Winner	School
2002	Terrell Suggs	Arizona State
2003	David Pollack	Georgia
2004	David Pollack (2)	Georgia
2005	Elvis Dumervil	Louisville
2006	LaMarr Woodley	Michigan
2007	Chris Long	Virginia
2008	Brian Orakpo	Texas
2009	Jerry Hughes	TCU
2010	Da'Quan Bowers	Clemson
2011	Whitney Mercilus	Illinois
2012	Jadeveon Clowney	South Carolina
2013	Jackson Jeffcoat	Texas
2014	Nate Orchard	Utah
2015	Carl Nassib	Penn State
2016	Jonathan Allen	Alabama
2017	Bradley Chubb	NC State
2018	Clelin Ferrell	Clemson
2019	Chase Young	Ohio State
2020	No award given (Note: Attributed to the COVID-19 pandemic)	
2021	Aidan Hutchinson	Michigan
2022	Caleb Murphy	Ferris State
2023	Laiatu Latu	UCLA
2024	Donovan Ezeiruaku	Boston College
2025	Rueben Bain Jr.	Miami (FL)
