= Gene Upshaw Award =

Award for NCAA Division II college football linemen

- Awarded for: Best lineman in NCAA Division II college football
- Country: United States
- Presented by: Manheim Touchdown Club

History
- First award: 2004
- Most recent: Ferris State offensive tackle Tim Anderson

The Gene Upshaw Award is awarded to the best lineman, offensive or defensive, in NCAA Division II college football. The award is presented by the Manheim Touchdown Club and is recognized by the National Collegiate Athletic Association (NCAA).

The award is named after former guard Gene Upshaw, who played college football for the Texas A&I Javelinas and later for the Oakland Raiders in the National Football League (NFL). He was inducted into both the College Football Hall of Fame and Pro Football Hall of Fame.

== Criteria ==
- Must be a junior or senior in athletic eligibility and competed in at least 70 percent of the team's regular season games.
- Must play at one of the following positions: offensive tackle, guard, center; defensive end, defensive tackle or nose tackle.
- Must be of good academic standing (eligible to compete). Ineligible players will be disqualified.
- Must be an All-American or all-region caliber candidate (first- or second-team).
- Only one nominee per institution (regardless of position).

== Winners ==
Season	Player	Position	School	Ref.
2004	Nathan Baker	Offensive lineman	Pittsburg State	
2005	Mike McFadden	Defensive lineman	Grand Valley State	
2006	Mike McFadden (2)	Defensive lineman	Grand Valley State	
2007	Brandon Barnes	Offensive tackle	Grand Valley State	
2008	Sam Collins	Center	Abilene Christian	
2009	Ben Staggs	Offensive tackle	West Liberty	
2010	Brandon Fusco	Center	Slippery Rock	
2011	Joe Long	Offensive tackle	Wayne State (MI)	
2012	Garth Heikkinen	Guard	Minnesota Duluth	
2013	Darius Allen	Defensive end	CSU Pueblo	
2014	Darius Allen (2)	Defensive end	CSU Pueblo	
2015	Matthew Judon	Defensive end	Grand Valley State	
2016	Jordan Morgan	Offensive tackle	Kutztown	
2017	Marcus Martin	Defensive end	Slippery Rock	
2018	Markus Jones	Defensive end	Angelo State	
2019	Austin Edwards	Defensive end	Ferris State	
2020	Not awarded due to COVID-19 pandemic.			
2021	Dylan Pasquali	Offensive tackle	Ferris State	
2022	Caleb Murphy	Defensive end	Ferris State	
2023	Levi Johnson	Offensive tackle	Colorado Mines	
2024	Marquise Fleming	Defensive end	Wingate	
2025	Tim Anderson	Offensive tackle	Ferris State	

=== Awards won by school ===
Schools in italics are no longer Division II members.

School	Winners
Ferris State	4
Grand Valley State	4
Slippery Rock	2
CSU Pueblo	2
Abilene Christian	1
Angelo State	1
Colorado Mines	1
Kutztown	1
Minnesota Duluth	1
Pittsburg State	1
Wayne State (MI)	1
West Liberty	1
Wingate	1
