= Ferris State Bulldogs football, 2020–present =

American college football season

2020–present Ferris State Bulldogs football
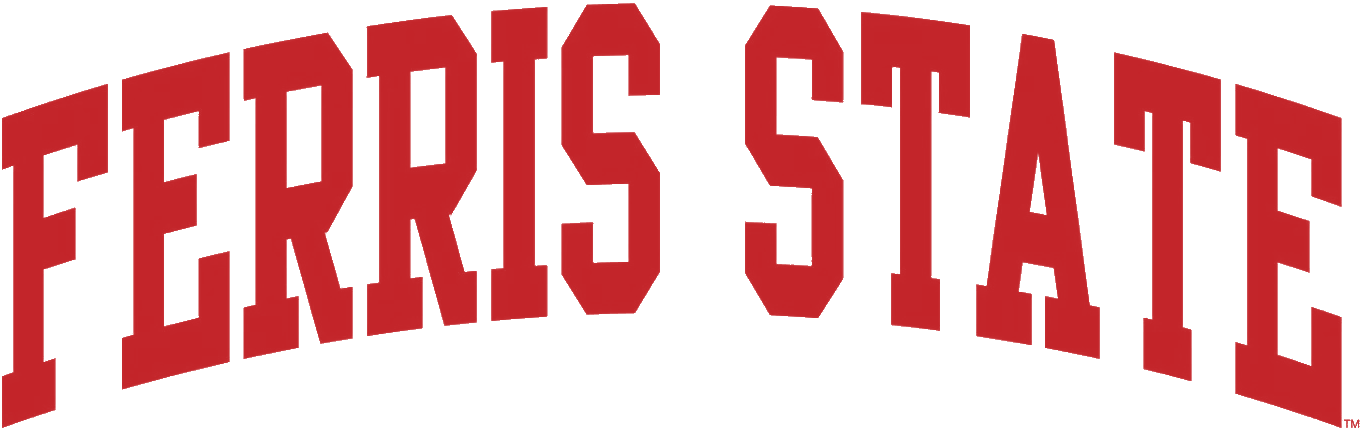
- Conference: Great Lakes Intercollegiate Athletic Conference
- Head coach: Tony Annese (2012– )
- Home stadium: Top Taggart Field

The Ferris State Bulldogs football program, 2020–present represented Ferris State University during the 2020s in NCAA Division II college football as a member of the Great Lakes Intercollegiate Athletic Conference (GLIAC). The team has been led by head coach Tony Annese since 2012. Highlights of the decade included:

- The 2021 Ferris State Bulldogs football team compiled a perfect 14–0 record, including a victory over Valdosta State in the Division II national championship game. It was the school's first national championship in football. Quarterback Jared Bernhardt led the team in passing, rushing, and scoring, and was named GLIAC Player of the Year.
- The 2022 team won the school's second consecutive Division II national championship, defeating Colorado Mines in the national championship game. Caleb Murphy tallied 25.5 sacks and 39 tackles for loss, was selected as the GLIAC Player of the Year and won the Ted Hendricks Award as the best defensive end in college football, regardless of division.
- The 2023 team was ranked No. 3 at the end of the regular season and lost on the road to No. 2 Grand Valley State in the first round of the NCAA Division II playoffs.
- The 2024 team compiled a 14–1 record and won the school's third national championship in four years. Dual-threat quarterback Trinidad Chambliss was a finalist for the Harlon Hill Trophy after tallying 26 passing touchdowns and 25 rushing touchdowns.

The team played its home games at Top Taggart Field in Big Rapids, Michigan.

== Decade overview ==
Year	Head coach	Overall record	Conf. record	Conf. rank	Points scored	Points allowed	Delta	Postseason result	AFCA ranking
2021	Tony Annese	14–0	7–0	1	661	256	+405	W, Division II national championship game	1
2022	Tony Annese	14–1	5–1	2	537	219	+318	W, Division II national championship game	1
2023	Tony Annese	8–3	5–1	2	442	197	+245	L, Division II first round	3
2024	Tony Annese	14–1	7–0	1	675	197	+478	W, Division II national championship game	1
TOTAL		50–5	24–2						

NCAA Division II national champion

== 2020 ==
The 2020 season was cancelled due to the COVID-19 pandemic.

== 2021 ==
2021 Ferris State Bulldogs football
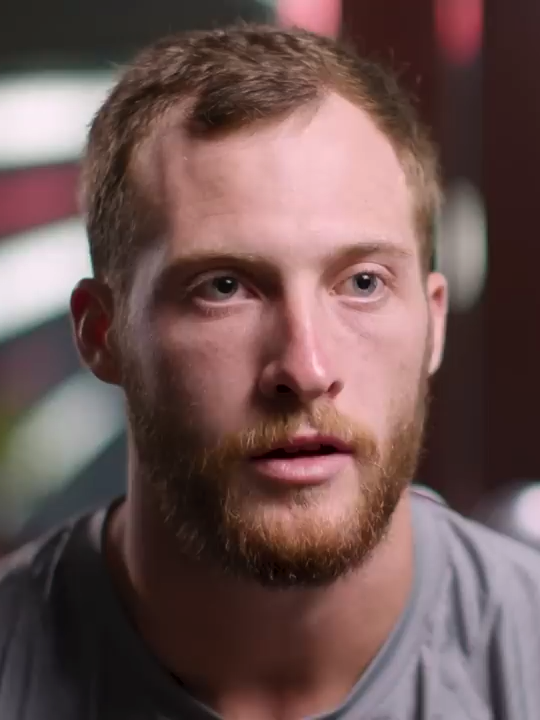
- 2021 GLIAC Player of the Year Jared Bernhardt

NCAA Division II national champion GLIAC champion

NCAA Division II Championship Game, W 58–17 vs. Valdosta State
- Conference: Great Lakes Intercollegiate Athletic Conference

Ranking
- AFCA: No. 1
- Record: 14–0 (7–0 GLIAC)
- Head coach: Tony Annese (10th season)
- Offensive coordinator: Steve Annese (10th season)
- Offensive scheme: Spread option
- Defensive coordinator: Ryan Hodges (7th season)
- Base defense: 4–3
- Home stadium: Top Taggart Field

2021 Great Lakes Intercollegiate Athletic Conference football standings
	Conf.			Overall
Team	W		L	W		L
No. 1 Ferris State $^	7	–	0	14	–	0
No. 7 Grand Valley State ^	6	–	1	10	–	2
Michigan Tech	5	–	2	6	–	4
Saginaw Valley State	4	–	3	7	–	4
Northern Michigan	2	–	5	4	–	7
Davenport	2	–	5	3	–	8
Wayne State (MI)	2	–	5	2	–	9
Northwood	0	–	7	1	–	9
$ – Conference champion; ^ – NCAA Division II playoff participant; Rankings from AFCA Poll

The 2021 Ferris State Bulldogs football team represented Ferris State University as a member of the Great Lakes Intercollegiate Athletic Conference (GLIAC) during the 2021 NCAA Division II football season. In their tenth year under head coach Tony Annese, the Bulldogs compiled a perfect 14–0 record (7–0 in conference games), won the GLIAC and NCAA Division II national championships, and outscored opponents by a total of 661 to 256. They advanced to the NCAA Division II playoff where they defeated Valdosta State in the national championship game. This was their first appearance in the championship game since the 2018 game. Ferris State defeated Valdosta State, 58–17. The win gave Ferris State its first national championship in football.

Senior quarterback Jared Bernhardt, who previously won the Tewaaraton Award as the nation's best collegiate lacrosse player while attending the University of Maryland, led the team in passing, rushing, and scoring. He completed 87 of 123 passes (70.7%) for 1,321 yards, 11 touchdowns, five interceptions, and a 182.4 efficiency rating. Bernhardt also led the team with 1,421 rushing yards on 159 carries for an average of 8.9 yards per carry. He scored 156 points on 26 rushing touchdowns.

Other key players included:

- Sophomore quarterback Mylik Mitchell also contributed to the offense, completing 84 of 130 passes (64.6%) for 1,321 yards, 12 touchdowns, two interceptions, and a 177.4 efficiency rating.
- Junior wide receiver Marcus Taylor led the team with 64 receptions for 863 yards.
- Senior linebacker Liam Daly led the team 92 total tackles.
- Sophomore defensive end Caleb Murphy led the team with 21.5 tackles for loss and 14.5 sacks.

=== Schedule ===
Date	Time	Opponent	Rank	Site	TV	Result	Attendance	Source
September 2	7:30 p.m.	Findlay*	No. 3	Top Taggart Field; Big Rapids, MI		W 54–14	6,625	
September 11	7:00 p.m.	at Ashland*	No. 2	Jack Miller Stadium; Ashland, OH		W 45–19	3,975	
September 18	7:00 p.m.	Saginaw Valley State	No. 2	Top Taggart Field; Big Rapids, MI		W 47–45 ^{OT}	6,012	
September 25	3:00 p.m.	Davenport*^{†}	No. 3	Top Taggart Field; Big Rapids, MI (rivalry)		W 38–0	6,636	
October 2	1:00 p.m.	at Northwood	No. 3	Hantz Stadium; Midland, MI		W 67–25	1,982	
October 16	7:00 p.m.	at No. 7 Grand Valley State	No. 3	Lubbers Stadium; Allendale, MI (Anchor–Bone Classic)		W 35–28	17,007	
October 23	1:00 p.m.	at Michigan Tech	No. 1	Kearly Stadium; Houghton, MI		W 38–10	1,332	
October 30	1:00 p.m.	Northern Michigan	No. 1	Top Taggart Field; Big Rapids, MI		W 44–24	2,460	
November 6	12:00 p.m.	at Davenport	No. 1	Farmer's Insurance Athletic Complex; Caledonia, MI		W 50–14	1,266	
November 13	1:00 p.m.	Wayne State	No. 1	Top Taggart Field; Big Rapids, MI		W 35–13	1,743	
November 27	1:00 p.m.	No. 4 Grand Valley State*	No. 1	Top Taggart Field; Big Rapids, MI (NCAA Division II Second Round)		W 54–20	3,742	
December 4	1:00 p.m.	No. 3 Northwest Missouri State*	No. 1	Top Taggart Field; Big Rapids, MI (NCAA Division II Quarterfinal)		W 41–20	4,127	
December 11	3:30 p.m.	No. 8 Shepherd*	No. 1	Top Taggart Field; Big Rapids, MI (NCAA Division II Semifinal)	ESPN+	W 55–7	2,473	
December 18	9:00 p.m.	vs. No. 5 Valdosta State*	No. 1	McKinney ISD Stadium; McKinney, TX (NCAA Division II Championship Game)	ESPNU	W 58–17	3,933	
*Non-conference game; ^{†}Homecoming; Rankings from AFCA Poll released prior to the game; All times are in Eastern time

=== Rankings ===
Ranking movements Legend: ██ Increase in ranking ██ Decrease in ranking ( ) = First-place votes
	Week												
Poll	Pre	1	2	3	4	5	6	7	8	9	10	11	Final
AFCA	3	2 (1)	2 (1)	3	3	3	3	1 (23)	1 (26)	1 (24)	1 (25)	1 (30)	1 (30)

== 2022 ==
2022 Ferris State Bulldogs football
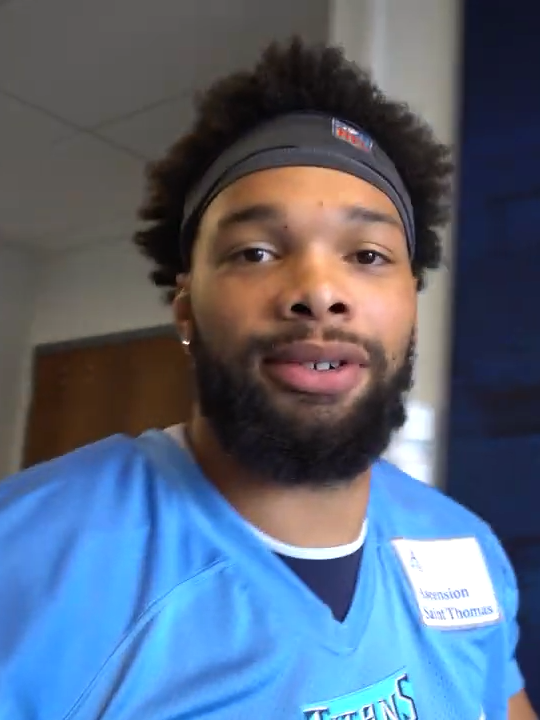
- 2022 GLIAC Player of the Year Caleb Murphy

NCAA Division II national champion

NCAA Division II Championship Game, W 41–14 vs. Colorado Mines
- Conference: Great Lakes Intercollegiate Athletic Conference

Ranking
- AFCA: No. 1
- Record: 14–1 (5–1 GLIAC)
- Head coach: Tony Annese (11th season)
- Offensive coordinator: Steve Annese (11th season)
- Defensive coordinator: Ryan Hodges (8th season)
- Home stadium: Top Taggart Field

2022 Great Lakes Intercollegiate Athletic Conference football standings
	Conf.			Overall
Team	W		L	W		L
No. 3 Grand Valley State $^	6	–	0	12	–	1
No. 1 Ferris State ^	5	–	1	14	–	1
No. 20 Davenport ^	4	–	2	8	–	3
Saginaw Valley State	3	–	3	8	–	3
Michigan Tech	2	–	4	4	–	7
Northern Michigan	1	–	5	4	–	7
Wayne State (MI)	0	–	6	1	–	9
$ – Conference champion; ^ – NCAA Division II playoff participant; Rankings from AFCA Poll

The 2022 Ferris State Bulldogs football team represented Ferris State University as a member of the Great Lakes Intercollegiate Athletic Conference (GLIAC) during the 2022 NCAA Division II football season. In their 11th year under head coach Tony Annese, the Bulldogs compiled a 14–1 record (5–1 in conference games), finished second in the GLIAC, and outscored opponents by a total of 537 to 219. They advanced to the NCAA Division II playoffs where they defeated Davenport in the first round, Pittsburg State in the second round, Grand Valley State in the quarterfinals, West Florida in the semifinals, and Colorado Mines in the Division II national championship game to repeat as NCAA Division II champions.

Defensive end Caleb Murphy tallied 25.5 sacks and 39 tackles for loss. He was the first Division II player to receive the Ted Hendricks Award as the best defensive end in college football, regardless of division. He was also named the GLIAC Player of the Year and won the Cliff Harris Award (top defensive lineman, lower divisions) and the Gene Upshaw Award (best Division II lineman). The team's other key players included:

- Quarterback Carson Gulker led the team in rushing with 882 yards on 187 carries for an average of 4.7 yards per carry. He also led the team in scoring with 186 points on 31 rushing touchdowns. Gulker also had 701 passing yards and a team-high 145.6 passer efficiency rating.
- Quarterback Mylik Mitchell completed 114 of 183 passes (62.3%) for 1,512 yards, six touchdowns, three interceptions, and a 139.2 efficiency rating.
- The team's leading receivers were Tyrese Hunt-Thompson (39 receptions, 714 yards, 18.3 yards per reception) and CJ Jefferson (58 receptions, 710 yards, 12.2 yards per carry).

=== Schedule ===
Date	Opponent	Rank	Site	Result	Attendance	Source
September 1	Central Washington*	No. 1	Top Taggart Field; Big Rapids, MI	W 36–20	7,101	
September 10	at Lenoir–Rhyne*	No. 1	Moretz Stadium; Hickory, NC	W 27–5	2,094	
September 24	Waldorf*^{†}	No. 1	Top Taggart Field; Big Rapids, MI	W 69–3	5,093	
October 1	at Findlay*	No. 1	Donnell Stadium; Findlay, OH	W 38–7	728	
October 8	at Saginaw Valley State	No. 1	Harvey Randall Wickes Memorial Stadium; Kochville, MI	W 33–28	3,627	
October 15	No. 2 Grand Valley State	No. 1	Top Taggart Field; Big Rapids, MI (Anchor-Bone Classic)	L 21–22	12,661	
October 22	Michigan Tech	No. 7	Top Taggart Field; Big Rapids, MI	W 28–20	4,914	
October 29	at Northern Michigan	No. 7	Superior Dome; Marquette, MI	W 56–20	1,769	
November 5	Davenport	No. 7	Top Taggart Field; Big Rapids, MI	W 28–7	3,600	
November 12	at Wayne State	No. 6	Tom Adams Field; Detroit, MI	W 40–14	1,675	
November 19	No. 21 Davenport*	No. 5	Top Taggart Field; Big Rapids, MI (NCAA Division II first round)	W 41–7	1,107	
November 26	No. 4 Pittsburg State*	No. 5	Top Taggart Field; Big Rapids, MI (NCAA Division II second round)	W 17–14	2,312	
December 3	at No. 1 Grand Valley State*	No. 5	Lubbers Stadium; Allendale, MI (NCAA Division II quarterfinal)	W 24–21	13,001	
December 10	No. 6 West Florida*	No. 5	Top Taggart Field; Big Rapids, MI (NCAA Division II semifinal)	W 38–17	5,105	
December 17	vs. No. 10 Colorado Mines*	No. 5	McKinney ISD Stadium; McKinney, TX (NCAA Division II Championship Game)	W 41–14	6,333	
*Non-conference game; ^{†}Homecoming; Rankings from AFCA Poll released prior to the game

== 2023 ==
2023 Ferris State Bulldogs football

NCAA Division II playoffs, first round, L 14–21 vs. Grand Valley State
- Conference: Great Lakes Intercollegiate Athletic Conference
- Record: 8–3 (5–1 GLIAC)
- Head coach: Tony Annese (12th season)
- Offensive coordinator: Steve Annese (12th season)
- Offensive scheme: Spread option
- Defensive coordinator: Ryan Hodges (9th season)
- Home stadium: Top Taggart Field

2023 Great Lakes Intercollegiate Athletic Conference football standings
	Conf.			Overall
Team	W		L	W		L
No. 3 Grand Valley State $^	6	–	0	11	–	2
No. 9 Ferris State ^	5	–	1	8	–	3
Davenport	4	–	2	8	–	2
Saginaw Valley State	3	–	3	6	–	5
Wayne State (MI)	2	–	4	3	–	8
Michigan Tech	1	–	5	5	–	5
Northern Michigan	0	–	6	0	–	11
$ – Conference champion; ^ – NCAA Division II playoff participant; Rankings from AFCA poll

The 2023 Ferris State Bulldogs football team represented Ferris State University as a member of the Great Lakes Intercollegiate Athletic Conference (GLIAC) during the 2024 NCAA Division II football season. In their 12th season under head coach Tony Annese, the Bulldogs compiled an 8–3 record (5–1 in conference games), finished second in the GLIAC, and outscored opponents by a total of 442 to 197. The Bulldogs, ranked No. 3 at the end of the regular season, advanced to the NCAA Division II playoffs where they lost to No. 2 Grand Valley State in the first round.

Prior to the season opener, Ferris State was ranked No. 1 nationally by Lindy's Sports and was ranked first in the GLIAC coaches poll.

The Bulldogs' 17–10 loss on September 16 to Division I FCS Montana snapped a six-year, 28-game road winning streak dating to September 2017.

In their homecoming match against Northern Michigan on September 30, the Bulldogs set new school records for points scored (78, of which 55 were scored in the first half) and for largest margin of victory (75 points). They tallied 705 yards of total offense, including 497 rushing yards in the game.

The team's statistical leaders included:

- Senior quarterback Mylik Mitchell completed 102 of 167 passes (61.1%) for 1,524 yards, 11 touchdowns, four interceptions, and a 154.7 passer efficiency rating.
- Sophomore quarterback Carson Gulker led the team in rushing with 707 rushing yards. He also led the team in scoring with 84 points on 14 rushing touchdowns. In the air, he tallied 722 passing yards (second on the team) and a team-high 179.6 passer efficiency rating.
- The team's leading receivers were Xavier Wade (42 receptions, 866 yards, 20.4-yard average) and Tyrese Hunt-Thompson (40 receptions, 759 yards, 19.0-yard average).

=== Schedule ===
Date	Time	Opponent	Rank	Site	TV	Result	Attendance	Source
August 31	8:00 p.m.	Mercyhurst	No. 1	Top Taggart Field; Big Rapids, MI	FloSports	W 54–12	5,114	
September 9	7:00 p.m.	at Ashland	No. 1	Jack Miller Field/Schar Athletic Complex; Ashland, OH		W 38–28	3,365	
September 16	8:00 p.m.	at No. 12 Montana (Division I FCS)	No. 1	Washington-Grizzly Stadium; Missoula, MT	ESPN+	L 10–17	26,978	
September 30	3:00 p.m.	Northern Michigan^{†}	No. 1	Top Taggart Field; Big Rapids, MI	FloSports	W 78–3	5,642	
October 7	1:00 p.m.	Saginaw Valley State	No. 1	Top Taggart Field; Big Rapids, MI	FloSports	W 38–17	3,124	
October 14	3:00 p.m.	at No. 7 Grand Valley State	No. 1	Lubbers Stadium; Allendale, MI (Anchor–Bone Classic)	FloSports	L 28–49	16,577	
October 21	1:00 p.m.	at Michigan Tech	No. 9	Kearly Stadium; Houghton, MI	FloSports	W 35–21	1,233	
October 28	1:00 p.m.	American International*	No. 8	Top Taggart Field; Big Rapids, MI	FloSports	W 56–0	2,400	
November 4	12:00 p.m.	at No. 9 Davenport	No. 7	Farmers Insurance Athletic Complex; Caledonia, MI	FloSports	W 28–10	2,150	
November 11	1:00 p.m.	Wayne State (MI)	No. 6	Top Taggart Field; Big Rapids, MI	FloSports	W 63–19	2,155	
November 18	1:00 p.m.	at No. 2 Grand Valley State	No. 5	Lubbers Stadium; Allendale, MI (NCAA Division II first round)		L 14–21	14,109	
*Non-conference game; ^{†}Homecoming; Rankings from AFCA Poll released prior to the game; All times are in Eastern time

== 2024 ==
2024 Ferris State Bulldogs football

GLIAC champion NCAA Division II national champion

NCAA Division II National Championship Game, W 49–14 vs. Valdosta State
- Conference: Great Lakes Intercollegiate Athletic Conference

Ranking
- AFCA: No. 1
- Record: 14–1 (7–0 GLIAC)
- Head coach: Tony Annese (13th season)
- Offensive coordinator: Steve Annese (13th season)
- Offensive scheme: Spread option
- Defensive coordinator: Ryan Hodges (10th season)
- Co-defensive coordinator: Tony Annese II (1st season)
- Base defense: 4–3
- Home stadium: Top Taggart Field

The 2024 Ferris State Bulldogs football team represented Ferris State University as a member of the Great Lakes Intercollegiate Athletic Conference (GLIAC) during the 2024 NCAA Division II football season. In their 13th season under head coach Tony Annese, the Bulldogs compiled a 14–1 record (7–0 in conference games) and outscored opponents by a total of 675 to 197, a delta of 478 points. After losing the season opener on the road against Pittsburg State, the Bulldogs finished the season with 14 consecutive victories and won the GLIAC championship and the NCAA Division II national championship. Ferris State participated in the Division II playoffs, defeating Central Oklahoma in the second round, defending national champion Harding in the quarterfinals, Slippery Rock in the semifinals, and Valdosta State in the Division II national championship game.

Junior quarterback Trinidad Chambliss completed 226 of 367 passes (61.6%) for 2,925 yards, 26 touchdowns, six interceptions, and a 148.6 passer efficiency rating. Chambliss also tallied 1,019 rushing yards and led the team in scoring with 150 points on 25 rushing touchdowns. In April 2025, Chambliss announced that, rather than return to Ferris State for his senior year, he was transferring to Ole Miss.

Kannon Katzer was the team's leading ground-gainer with 1,128 rushing yards on 128 carries, an average of 8.8 yards per carry.

Senior Emari O'Brien was the leading receiver with 48 catches for 657 yards.

== 2025 ==
2025 Ferris State Bulldogs football
- Conference: Great Lakes Intercollegiate Athletic Conference

Ranking
- AFCA: No. 1
- Record: 5–0 (1–0 GLIAC)
- Head coach: Tony Annese (14th season)
- Home stadium: Top Taggart Field

2025 Great Lakes Intercollegiate Athletic Conference football standings
	Conf.			Overall
Team	W		L	W		L
No. 1 Ferris State $^	7	–	0	16	–	0
Grand Valley State	5	–	2	7	–	3
Saginaw Valley State	5	–	2	6	–	5
Michigan Tech	4	–	3	7	–	4
Davenport	4	–	3	5	–	5
Northern Michigan	2	–	5	3	–	8
Roosevelt*	1	–	6	2	–	8
Wayne State (MI)	0	–	7	0	–	11
$ – Conference champion; ^ – NCAA Division II playoff participant; * – Roosevelt ineligible for postseason play due to transition from NAIA; Rankings from AFCA poll

The 2025 Ferris State Bulldogs football team represents Ferris State University as a member of the Great Lakes Intercollegiate Athletic Conference (GLIAC) during the 2025 NCAA Division II football season. Tony Annese is expected to lead the team in his 14th season as the Bulldogs' head coach.

=== Schedule ===
Date	Time	Opponent	Rank	Site	Result	Attendance
August 28	6:00 p.m.	No. 9 Pittsburg State*	No. 1	Top Taggart Field; Big Rapids, MI	W 34–17	5,434
September 6	2:00 p.m.	at Lake Erie*	No. 1	Jack Britt Memorial Stadium; Painesville, OH	W 63–6	494
September 13	6:00 p.m.	Tiffin*	No. 1	Top Taggart Field; Big Rapids, MI	W 41–34	3,356
September 20	3:00 p.m.	Rio Grande*^{†}	No. 1	Top Taggart Field; Big Rapids, MI	W 76–0	5,477
October 4	1:00 p.m.	at Roosevelt	No. 1	Morris Field; Arlington Heights, IL	W 66–0	592
October 11	1:00 p.m.	Wayne State (MI)	No. 1	Top Taggart Field; Big Rapids, MI	W 59–0	3,124
October 18	12:00 p.m.	at Michigan Tech	No. 1	Sherman Field; Houghton, MI	W 38–10	1,635
October 25	1:00 p.m.	No. 18 Grand Valley State	No. 1	Top Taggart Field; Big Rapids, MI (Anchor–Bone Classic)	W 38–31	10,089
November 1	1:00 p.m.	Northern Michigan	No. 1	Top Taggart Field; Big Rapids, MI	W 70–35	2,843
November 8	1:00 p.m.	at Saginaw Valley State	No. 1	Harvey Randall Wickes Memorial Stadium; University Center, MI	W 51–45 ^{2OT}	4,263
November 15	1:00 p.m.	at Davenport	No. 1	Farmers Insurance Athletic Complex; Caledonia Township, MI (Calder City Classic)	W 44–23	1,266
November 22	1:00 p.m.	Northwood*	No. 1	Top Taggart Field; Big Rapids, MI (NCAA Division II First Round)	W 65–14	3,124
November 29	1:00 p.m.	No. 18 Ashland*	No. 1	Top Taggart Field; Big Rapids, MI (NCAA Division II Second Round)	W 56–24	1,326
December 6	1:00 p.m.	No. 21 Minnesota State*	No. 1	Top Taggart Field; Big Rapids, MI (NCAA Division II Quarterfinal)	W 52–29	1,582
December 13	12:00 p.m.	No. 16 Newberry*	No. 1	Top Taggart Field; Big Rapids, MI (NCAA Division II Semifinal)	W 49–17	1,089
December 20	4:00 p.m.	vs. No. 2 Harding*	No. 1	McKinney ISD Stadium; McKinney, TX (NCAA Division II National Championship Game)	W 42–21	10,521
*Non-conference game; ^{†}Homecoming; Rankings from AFCA Poll released prior to the game; All times are in Eastern time
