= 1961 Mayville State Comets football team =

American college football season

1961 Mayville State Comets football

NDIC champion
- Conference: North Dakota Intercollegiate Conference
- Record: 8–0 (6–0 NDIC)
- Head coach: Jerome Berg (6th season)

1961 North Dakota Intercollegiate Conference football standings
	Conf.					Overall
Team	W		L		T	W		L		T
Mayville State $	6	–	0	–	0	8	–	0	–	0
Wahpeton Science	4	–	2	–	0	6	–	2	–	0
Dickinson State	4	–	2	–	0	5	–	3	–	0
Jamestown	3	–	3	–	0	4	–	4	–	0
Minot State	3	–	3	–	0	4	–	5	–	0
Valley City State	1	–	5	–	0	1	–	7	–	0
Ellendale	0	–	6	–	0	0	–	7	–	0
$ – Conference champion

The 1961 Mayville State Comets football team was an American football team that represented Mayville State Teachers College (now known as Mayville State University) as a member of the North Dakota Intercollegiate Conference (NDIC) during the 1961 college football season. In their sixth year under head coach Jerome Berg, the Comets compiled a perfect 8–0 record (6–0 in conference games), won the NDCAC championship, and outscored all opponents by a total of 203 to 47.

Seven Mayville players were selected as first-team players on the 1961 All-NDIC football team: back Art Oliver; end Darryl Glbran; tackles Vern Spitzer and Wendell Corbett; guards Ken Nessa, Dick Roragen, and Mike Strand.

The team played its home games in Mayville, North Dakota.

== Schedule ==
Date	Opponent	Site	Result	Source
September 15	Minot State	Mayville, ND	W 32–13	
September 22	at Ellendale	Ellendale, ND	W 40–0	
September 29	at Bethel (MN)*	Saint Paul, MM	W 21–7	
October 7	Valley City State	Mayville, ND (rivaly)	W 37–0	
October 13	Dickinson State	Mayville, ND	W 7–0	
October 21	at Jamestown	Jamestown, ND	W 19–14	
October 27	at Wahpeton Science	Wahpeton, ND	W 14–13	
November 4	Northland*	Mayville, ND	W 33–0	
*Non-conference game
