= Jerome Berg =

American football coach (1926–2011)

Biographical details
- Born: December 27, 1926; Newburgh Township, North Dakota, U.S.
- Died: January 14, 2011 (aged 84); Mayville, North Dakota, U.S.

Playing career

Football
- c. 1950: Mayville State

Basketball
- c. 1950: Mayville State

Baseball
- c. 1950: Mayville State

Track
- c. 1950: Mayville State

Coaching career (HC unless noted)

Football
- 1952: Finley HS (ND)
- 1953–1955: Fertile HS (MN) (assistant)
- 1956–1966: Mayville State

Basketball
- 1953–1956: Fertile HS (MN)

Administrative career (AD unless noted)
- 1953–1956: Fertile HS (MN)

Head coaching record
- Overall: 62–20–2 (college)

Accomplishments and honors

Championships
- 6 NDIC/NDCAC (1959–1961, 1964–1966)

Jerome Richard Berg (December 27, 1926 – January 14, 2011) was an American football coach. He served as the head football coach at Mayville State College—now known as Mayville State University—in Mayville, North Dakota, from 1956 to 1966, compiling a record of 62–20–2.

Berg was born on December 27, 1926, in Newburgh Township in Steele County, North Dakota. He attended Hatton High School in Hatton, North Dakota, before serving the United States Army toward the end of World War II. He lettered in football, basketball, baseball, and track at Mayville State before graduating in 1951.

Berg coached high school sports in Finley, North Dakota, and at Fertile High School in Fertile, Minnesota. He was the athletic director, head basketball coach and assistant football coach at Fertile for three years before he was appointed head coach in football and track at Mayville in June 1956. Berg resigned from his post at Mayville State following the 1966 football season and took a job with the Goose River Bank in Mayville.

In 1997, Mayville State University renamed its football field Jerome Berg Field in recognition of Berg's contributions to the university.

Berg died on January 14, 2011, at Luther Memorial Home in Mayville.

== Head coaching record ==
=== College ===
| Year | Team | Overall | Conference | Standing | Bowl/playoffs |
|---|---|---|---|---|---|
Mayville State Comets (North Dakota Intercollegiate Conference / North Dakota College Athletic Conference) (1956–1966)
| 1956 | Mayville State | 4–3 | 4–2 | T–2nd | |
| 1957 | Mayville State | 3–4 | 2–4 | T–6th | |
| 1958 | Mayville State | 4–3 | 4–3 | 4th | |
| 1959 | Mayville State | 6–0–1 | 5–0–1 | 1st | |
| 1960 | Mayville State | 7–1 | 5–1 | T–1st | |
| 1961 | Mayville State | 8–0 | 6–0 | 1st | |
| 1962 | Mayville State | 6–2 | 4–2 | T–3rd | |
| 1963 | Mayville State | 5–2–1 | 4–1–1 | 2nd | |
| 1964 | Mayville State | 6–2 | 5–1 | T–1st | |
| 1965 | Mayville State | 7–1 | 6–0 | 1st | |
| 1966 | Mayville State | 6–2 | 5–1 | T–1st | |
| Mayville State: | | 62–20–2 | 50–15–2 | | |
| Total: | | 62–20–2 | | | |
National championship Conference title Conference division title or championship game berth

== See also ==
- List of college football career coaching winning percentage leaders
