= Jim Purtill =

American football coach (born 1955)

Current position
- Title: Offensive coordinator & offensive line coach
- Team: Walsh
- Conference: G-MAC

Biographical details
- Born: November 5, 1955 (age 70); Ohio, U.S.

Coaching career (HC unless noted)
- 1981: Salem (assistant)
- 1982: Salem
- 1983–1987: Cornell (assistant)
- 1988–1994: Ferris State (OL)
- 1995–1998: Albion (OC)
- 1999–2013: St. Norbert
- 2015–2016: Wisconsin–Oshkosh (QB)
- 2017–2019: Davenport (OC/QB)
- 2020: Wesley (DE) (OC)
- 2023–present: Walsh (OC/OL)

Head coaching record
- Overall: 130–39–1
- Tournaments: 1–11 (NCAA D-III playoffs)

Accomplishments and honors

Championships
- 11 MWC (1999–2004, 2006–2007, 2010, 2012–2013)

Jim Purtill (born November 5, 1955) is an American college football coach. He is the offensive coordinator and offensive line coach for Walsh University, positions he has held since 2023. He served as the head football coach at Salem University in Salem, West Virginia in 1982 and St. Norbert College in De Pere, Wisconsin from 1999 to 2013. He was the offensive coordinator and quarterbacks coach at Davenport University in Grand Rapids, Michigan from 2017 to 2019. Purtill graduated from Miami University in Oxford, Ohio in 1978.

== Head coaching record ==
Year	Team	Overall	Conference	Standing	Bowl/playoffs
Salem Tigers (West Virginia Intercollegiate Athletic Conference) (1982)
1982	Salem	0–9–1	0–7–1	9th	
Salem:		0–9–1	0–7–1		
St. Norbert Green Knights (Midwest Conference) (1999–2013)
1999	St. Norbert	9–2	9–0	1st	L NCAA Division III First Round
2000	St. Norbert	10–1	9–0	1st	L NCAA Division III First Round
2001	St. Norbert	8–2	7–1	T–1st	L NCAA Division III First Round
2002	St. Norbert	9–1	8–1	T–1st	L NCAA Division III First Round
2003	St. Norbert	11–1	9–0	1st	L NCAA Division III Second Round
2004	St. Norbert	9–2	9–0	1st	L NCAA Division III First Round
2005	St. Norbert	8–2	8–1	2nd	
2006	St. Norbert	10–1	9–0	1st	L NCAA Division III First Round
2007	St. Norbert	10–1	9–0	1st	L NCAA Division III First Round
2008	St. Norbert	7–3	7–2	3rd	
2009	St. Norbert	9–1	8–1	2nd	
2010	St. Norbert	7–4	7–2	1st	L NCAA Division III First Round
2011	St. Norbert	7–3	7–2	3rd	
2012	St. Norbert	8–3	8–1	T–1st	L NCAA Division III First Round
2013	St. Norbert	8–3	8–1	1st	L NCAA Division III First Round
St. Norbert:		130–30	122–12		
Total:		130–39–1			
National championship Conference title Conference division title or championship game berth
