= Tony Annese =

American football player and coach

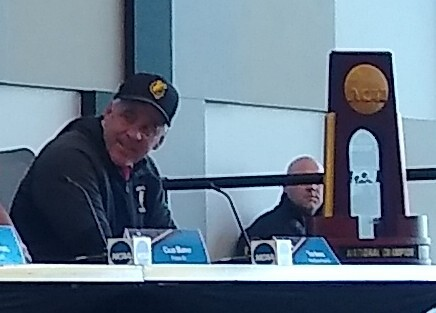
- Annese (left) with the 2022 NCAA Division II Football Championship trophy

Current position
- Title: Head coach
- Team: Ferris State
- Conference: GLIAC
- Record: 164–21

Biographical details
- Born: c. 1961 (age 64–65)

Playing career
- 1981–1983: Alma
- Position: Wide receiver

Coaching career (HC unless noted)
- 1984: Muskegon Catholic Central HS (MI) (assistant)
- 1985–1986: West Ottawa HS (MI) (assistant)
- 1987–1994: Montrose HS (MI)
- 1995–1996: Pioneer HS (MI)
- 1997–1999: Jenison HS (MI)
- 2000–2008: Muskegon HS (MI)
- 2009–2011: Grand Rapids CC
- 2012–present: Ferris State

Head coaching record
- Overall: 195–41 (high school); 30–4 (junior college); 164–21 (college)
- Tournaments: 29–7 (NCAA D-II playoffs)

Accomplishments and honors

Championships
- 3 MHSAA (2004, 2006, 2008); 2 NJCAA (2009, 2011); 4 NCAA Division II (2021–2022, 2024–2025); 8 GLIAC (2014–2015, 2018–2019, 2021–2022, 2024–2025)

Tony Annese (born c. 1961) is an American college football coach. He is the head football coach for Ferris State University, a position he has held since 2012. Annese started his coaching career at the high school level. He served as the head coach at four different high schools from 1987 to 2008 in Michigan, winning three Michigan High School Athletic Association (MHSAA) Division 2 State Championships with the Muskegon High School Big Reds. Annese the served as the head football coach at Grand Rapids Community College in Grand Rapids, Michigan, from 2009 to 2011, leading his teams to two National Junior College Athletic Association (NJCAA) Division II championships, in 2009 and 2011. Annese led the Ferris State Bulldogs to consecutive NCAA Division II Football Championship titles twice in 2021 and 2022, and in 2024 and 2025.

== Playing career ==
Annese attended Corunna High School in Corunna, Michigan. He earned 2nd team all-conference honors while playing quarterback. He then attended Alma College moving to wide receiver for the Scots. He ranked fourth in receiving in the Michigan Intercollegiate Athletic Association for the 1981 season.

== Coaching career ==
=== High school ===
Annese spent the first three years of his football coaching career as an assistant, first with Muskegon Catholic Central High School and then West Ottawa High School. His first head coaching position was at Montrose High School in Montrose, Michigan. His first season, the team posted a 4–5 record. The next seven seasons, his teams would never lose a conference game, only lose two regular season games, qualify for the state playoffs four times and making the semifinals twice. During his tenure, three Montrose players would earn a division I scholarship.

Annese accepted the head coaching position at Pioneer High School in Ann Arbor, Michigan for the 1995 season. Annese expressed the desire for a new challenge of building a new program at a larger school. In two seasons at Pioneer, his team earned a 5–4 record each year. Annese would accept the head coaching position at Jenison High School in Jenison, Michigan for the 1997 season. He said he left Pioneer due to the unfilfullied promise of a teaching position within the school, instead he taught at three different schools in the district each day. Pioneer's former principal and athletic director say no promise was made, but another member of the search committee confirmed Annese's claim.

Annese coached at Jenison for three seasons posting records of 7–2, 7–2, and 8–2. His teams made the playoffs twice and won the conference in his final season in 1999.

Annese then took the head coaching position at Muskegon High School in Muskegon, Michigan. His teams won three Division 2 state championships, made the playoffs every year, and won the conference championship five out of six seasons. Annese resigned after the 2007 season citing burnout and family as reasons. The resignation was short lived, however, as he was rehired for the job just three months later after Muskegon's top two choices for the vacancy turned down offers for personal reasons. Entering the 2008 season, the team returned only three starters. Despite this, they went 14-0 en route to Annese's third state championship.

Annese also coached boys and girls basketball at Whitehall High School for several years while coaching football at Muskegon and Grand Rapids Community College.

=== College ===
==== Grand Rapids Community College ====
On January 22, 2009, Annese was announced as the head coach for Grand Rapids Community College. In his first season, GRCC went undefeated in the regular season and was rated #3 anticipating an invitation to Citizen Bank Bowl to play the #1 ranked team. Before that could happen, GRCC self reported use of an ineligible player for a single play in an earlier game. The infraction caused GRCC to forfeit the game, drop their record to 9–1. Despite losing the Top of the Mountain Bowl to #8 Snow College, they were recognized as the top non-scholarship team in the nation.

The 2010 team finished with a 10–2 record which ended in a 63–58 loss to Mississippi Gulf Coast in the Mississippi Bowl. This team led the nation in offense averaging 458.5 yards per game.

In 2011, Annese's squad finished the season a perfect 11-0 and was ranked #3 in the nation. Despite this, the Raiders did not receive an invitation to a top bowl game. Annese stated he was told the bowl organizers choose other schools over GRCC because of lack of anticipated ticket sales. They were invited to the Top of the Mountain Bowl to play #16 ranked, three loss Snow College. GRCC declined the invitation due to cost and perceived lack of respect. They would finish ranked #4.

Annese coached 14 All-Americans in three seasons at GRCC. Less than three weeks after Annese announced he would be leaving GRCC, the college canceled the football program citing Title IX concerns, travel costs associated with being the only Junior College football team in the state, and loss of Annese.

==== Ferris State University ====
Annese was announced as the head coach at Division II Ferris State University on December 22, 2011. In 13 seasons, Annese's Bulldogs have won seven conference championships, qualified for the playoffs 11 times and have won four Division II National Championships. In December 2026 Annese will be inducted into the Michigan Sports Hall of Fame in Detroit.

== Head coaching record ==
=== High school ===
| Year | Team | Overall | Conference | Standing | Bowl/playoffs |
|---|---|---|---|---|---|
Montrose Rams (Genesee Eight Athletic Conference) (1987–1994)
| 1987 | Montrose | 4–5 | 4–3 | T–3rd | |
| 1988 | Montrose | 7–2 | 7–0 | 1st | |
| 1989 | Montrose | 9–0 | 7–0 | 1st | |
| 1990 | Montrose | 10–1 | 7–0 | 1st | L MHSAA Class B Regional |
| 1991 | Montrose | 9–0 | 8–0 | 1st | |
| 1992 | Montrose | 11–1 | 8–0 | 1st | L MHSAA Class B Semifinal |
| 1993 | Montrose | 10–1 | 8–0 | 1st | L MHSAA Class CC Regional |
| 1994 | Montrose | 11–1 | 8–0 | 1st | L MHSAA Class CC Semifinal |
| Montrose: | | 71–11 | 57–3 | | |
Ann Arbor Pioneer Pioneers (South Central Conference) (1995–1996)
| 1995 | Pioneer | 5–4 | 1–2 | T–2nd | |
| 1996 | Pioneer | 5–4 | 2–1 | T–1st | |
| Pioneer: | | 10–8 | 3–3 | | |
Jenison Wildcats (Ottawa-Kent Conference) (1997–1999)
| 1997 | Jenison | 7–2 | 5–2 | T–2nd (Red) | |
| 1998 | Jenison | 7–3 | 6–1 | 2nd (Red) | L MHSAA Class AA Pre-regional |
| 1999 | Jenison | 8–2 | 6–1 | T–1st (Red) | L MHSAA Division 2 Pre-district |
| Jenison: | | 22–7 | 17–4 | | |
Muskegon Big Reds (Independent) (2000–2002)
| 2000 | Muskegon | 8–2 | | | L MHSAA Division 1 Pre-district |
| 2001 | Muskegon | 7–4 | | | L MHSAA Division 1 District |
| 2002 | Muskegon | 10–2 | | | L MHSAA Division 1 Regional |
Muskegon Big Reds (Ottawa-Kent Conference) (2003–2008)
| 2003 | Muskegon | 9–2 | 6–0 | 1st (Red-Lakeshore) | L MHSAA Division 2 District |
| 2004 | Muskegon | 14–0 | 6–0 | 1st (Red-Lakeshore) | W MSHAA Division 2 State Championship |
| 2005 | Muskegon | 7–3 | 5–1 | 2nd (Green) | L MHSAA Division 2 Pre-district |
| 2006 | Muskegon | 14–0 | 6–0 | 1st (Green) | W MSHAA Division 2 State Championship |
| 2007 | Muskegon | 9–2 | 6–1 | T–1st (Red) | L MHSAA Division 2 District |
| 2008 | Muskegon | 14–0 | 7–0 | 1st (Red) | W MSHAA Division 2 State Championship |
| Muskegon: | | 92–15 | 36–2 | | |
| Total: | | 195–41 | | | |
National championship Conference title Conference division title or championship game berth

=== Junior college ===
| Year | Team | Overall | Conference | Standing | Bowl/playoffs | Rank^{#} |
|---|---|---|---|---|---|---|
Grand Rapids Raiders (Midwest Football Conference) (2009–2011)
| 2009 | Grand Rapids | 9–2 | 7–1 | 1st (East) | W NJCAA National Football Championship | 6 |
| 2010 | Grand Rapids | 10–2 | 6–1 | 1st (East) | L Top of the Mountain Bowl | 8 |
| 2011 | Grand Rapids | 11–0 | 7–0 | 1st (East) | | 4 |
| Grand Rapids: | | 30–4 | 20–2 | | | |
| Total: | | 30–4 | | | | |
National championship Conference title Conference division title or championship game berth

=== College ===
| Year | Team | Overall | Conference | Standing | Bowl/playoffs | AFCA^{#} | D2^{°} |
|---|---|---|---|---|---|---|---|
Ferris State Bulldogs (Great Lakes Intercollegiate Athletic Conference) (2012–present)
| 2012 | Ferris State | 7–4 | 6–4 | 5th (North) | | | |
| 2013 | Ferris State | 8–3 | 8–2 | 2nd (North) | | | |
| 2014 | Ferris State | 11–1 | 10–0 | 1st | L NCAA Division II Second Round | 11 | |
| 2015 | Ferris State | 11–1 | 10–0 | 1st | L NCAA Division II Second Round | 6 | |
| 2016 | Ferris State | 12–3 | 9–2 | 2nd | L NCAA Division II Semifinal | 5 | |
| 2017 | Ferris State | 11–2 | 8–1 | 2nd | L NCAA Division II Quarterfinal | 5 | |
| 2018 | Ferris State | 15–1 | 8–0 | 1st | L NCAA Division II Championship | 2 | |
| 2019 | Ferris State | 12–1 | 8–0 | 1st | L NCAA Division II Semifinal | 3 | |
| 2020 | No season —COVID-19 | | | | | | |
| 2021 | Ferris State | 14–0 | 7–0 | 1st | W NCAA Division II Championship | 1 | 1 |
| 2022 | Ferris State | 14–1 | 5–1 | 2nd | W NCAA Division II Championship | 1 | 1 |
| 2023 | Ferris State | 8–3 | 5–1 | 2nd | L NCAA Division II First Round | 9 | 6 |
| 2024 | Ferris State | 14–1 | 7–0 | 1st | W NCAA Division II Championship | 1 | 1 |
| 2025 | Ferris State | 16–0 | 7–0 | 1st | W NCAA Division II Championship | 1 | 1 |
| 2026 | Ferris State | 11–0 | 7–0 | | | | |
| Ferris State: | | 164–21 | 105–11 | | | | |
| Total: | | 164–21 | | | | | |
National championship Conference title Conference division title or championship game berth

== Awards ==
- 2004 Michigan High School Football Coaches Association (MHSFCA) Division 2 Coach of the Year
- 2006 MHSFCA Division 2 Coach of the Year
- 2006 Michigan High School Coaches Association Coach of the Year
- 2008 MHSFCA Division 2 Coach of the Year
- Member, Michigan High School Football Coaches Hall of Fame
- 2021 D2Football Head Coach of the Year
- 2022 D2Football Head Coach of the Year
- 2024 D2Football Head Coach of the Year

== See also ==
- List of college football career coaching winning percentage leaders
