= 2023 Mercyhurst Lakers football team =

American college football season

2023 Mercyhurst Lakers football
- Conference: Pennsylvania State Athletic Conference
- Record: 2–9 (1–6 PSCAC)
- Head coach: Ryan Riemedio (2nd season)
- Offensive coordinator: Eric Acciani (2nd season)
- Defensive coordinator: Bryce Dempsey (2nd as DC, 3rd overall season)
- Home stadium: Saxon Stadium

2023 Pennsylvania State Athletic Conference football standings
	Conf.			Overall
Team	W		L	W		L
East Division
No. 7 Kutztown xy$^	7	–	0	11	–	2
East Stroudsburg ^	5	–	2	9	–	3
Shepherd ^	5	–	2	9	–	3
West Chester	3	–	4	6	–	5
Lock Haven	3	–	4	5	–	6
Shippensburg	2	–	5	3	–	8
Bloomsburg	2	–	5	3	–	8
Millersville	1	–	6	3	–	8
West Division
No. 10 Slippery Rock xy^	7	–	0	12	–	2
California (PA)	6	–	1	7	–	3
Gannon	5	–	2	5	–	6
Seton Hill	4	–	3	6	–	5
IUP	3	–	4	6	–	5
Edinboro	1	–	6	3	–	8
Clarion	1	–	6	2	–	9
Mercyhurst	1	–	6	2	–	9
Championship: Kutztown 31, Slippery Rock 7
$ – Conference champion; x – Division champion/co-champions; y – Championship game participant; ^ – NCAA Division II playoff participant; Rankings from AFCA Poll

The 2023 Mercyhurst Lakers football team represented Mercyhurst University as a member of the Pennsylvania State Athletic Conference (PSAC) during the 2023 NCAA Division II football season. Led by second-year head coach Ryan Riemedio, the Rams compiled an overall record of 2–9 with a mark of 1–6 in conference play, tying for last place in the PSAC West Division. The team played home games at Saxon Stadium in Erie, Pennsylvania.

== Schedule ==
Date	Time	Opponent	Site	Result	Attendance	Source
August 31	8:00 p.m.	at No. 1 Ferris State*	Top Taggart Field; Big Rapids, MI	L 12–54	5,114	
September 9	6:00 p.m.	Lock Haven	Saxon Stadium; Erie, PA	W 41–29	442	
September 16	12:00 p.m.	at Kutztown	Andre Reed Stadium; Kutztown, PA	L 14–47	3,562	
September 23	1:00 p.m.	IUP	Saxon Stadium; Erie, PA	L 13–30		
September 30	2:00 p.m.	at Edinboro	Sox Harrison Stadium; Edinboro, PA	L 24–40	3,654	
October 7	2:00 p.m.	Slippery Rock^{†}	Saxon Stadium; Erie, PA	L 31–75	1411	
October 14	12:00 p.m.	at Clarion	Memorial Stadium; Clarion, PA	W 36–35	987	
October 21	3:00 p.m.	Gannon	Saxon Stadium; Erie, PA	L 28–31	597	
October 28	12:00 p.m.	at California (PA)	Hepner–Bailey Field at Adamson Stadium; California, PA	L 19–58	2,427	
November 4	2:00 p.m.	Seton Hill	Saxon Stadium; Erie, PA	L 0–14	300	
November 11	12:00 p.m.	at Shepherd	Ram Stadium; Shepherdstown, WV	L 25–49	4,879	
*Non-conference game; ^{†}Homecoming; Rankings from AFCA Poll – Released prior to game; All times are in Eastern time
