= Norris Patterson =

American football coach and administrator (1917–2000)

Biographical details
- Born: October 10, 1917; Odessa, Missouri, U.S.
- Died: May 10, 2000 (aged 82); Liberty, Missouri, U.S.

Playing career

Football
- c. 1940: Missouri Valley

Basketball
- c. 1940: Missouri Valley

Baseball
- c. 1940: Missouri Valley

Coaching career (HC unless noted)

Football
- 1945–1948: Excelsior Springs HS (MO)
- 1949: Danville HS (IL)
- 1950–1967: William Jewell

Baseball
- 1952–1954: William Jewell
- 1959–1962: William Jewell

Administrative career (AD unless noted)
- 1950–1968: William Jewell
- 1970–1971: Emporia State
- 1971–1975: United States International

Head coaching record
- Overall: 133–33–9 (college football); 74–65 (college baseball)
- Bowls: 1–1–1

Accomplishments and honors

Championships
- Football; 12 MCAU (1950, 1953–1954, 1956, 1959–1960, 1962–1967) Baseball; 4 MCAU (1954, 1959–1960, 1962)

Norris A. Patterson (October 10, 1917 – May 10, 2000) was an American football coach and college athletics administrator. He served as the head football coach at William Jewell College in Liberty, Missouri from 1950 to 1967, compiling a record of 133–33–9. He coached Bill Snyder, who played as a defensive back at William Jewell from 1959 to 1962, and later served as head football coach at Kansas State University, and was inducted into the College Football Hall of Fame in 2015. Patterson was also the athletic director at William Jewell from 1950 to 1968 and United States International University—now known as Alliant International University—in San Diego, California from 1969 to 1975.

A native of Odessa, Missouri, Patterson attended Missouri Valley College in Marshall, Missouri, where he played college football under head coach Volney Ashford. He also lettered in basketball and baseball. Following his graduation, he taught and coached in Trenton and Marshall, Missouri. Patterson served for four years in the United States Navy during World War II as a gunnery officer and was promoted to the rank of lieutenant commander.

After returning from the war, Patterson became the head football coach at Excelsior Springs High School in Excelsior Springs, Missouri, where he led his teams to a record of 36–3 in four seasons. In 1949, he moved to Danville High School in Danville, Illinois, where his team was 8–1 that season. In December of that year, he was hired as head football coach and athletic director at William Jewell.

Patterson stepped down as football coach and athletic director at William Jewell in 1968 and took a role as coordinator of special projects with the school. In early 1969, he was named director of athletic and psychical education at United States International University. In addition to his bachelor's degree from Missouri Valley College, Patterson earned a master's degree from the University of Kansas City—now known as the University of Missouri–Kansas City and a doctorate in education from Columbia University.

Patterson died at the age of 82, on May 10, 2000, at Liberty Hospital in Liberty, Missouri.

== Head coaching record ==
=== College football ===
| Year | Team | Overall | Conference | Standing | Bowl/playoffs |
|---|---|---|---|---|---|
William Jewell Cardinals (Missouri College Athletic Union) (1950–1967)
| 1950 | William Jewell | 8–1 | 3–0 | 1st | |
| 1951 | William Jewell | 8–3 | 3–1 | 2nd | L Corn |
| 1952 | William Jewell | 10–1–1 | 3–1 | 2nd | |
| 1953 | William Jewell | 9–1 | 4–0 | 1st | |
| 1954 | William Jewell | 6–1–2 | 2–0–1 | T–1st | |
| 1955 | William Jewell | 5–4 | 2–1 | T–2nd | |
| 1956 | William Jewell | 6–3–1 | 1–0–1 | 1st | |
| 1957 | William Jewell | 7–1–2 | 1–0 | 2nd | W Mineral Water |
| 1958 | William Jewell | 7–3 | 2–1 | 2nd | |
| 1959 | William Jewell | 8–1 | 3–0 | 1st | |
| 1960 | William Jewell | 7–1–1 | 3–0–1 | T–1st | |
| 1961 | William Jewell | 7–3 | 3–1 | 2nd | |
| 1962 | William Jewell | 9–1 | 4–0 | 1st | |
| 1963 | William Jewell | 6–2–1 | 4–0 | 1st | |
| 1964 | William Jewell | 7–2 | 4–0 | 1st | |
| 1965 | William Jewell | 7–2 | 4–0 | 1st | |
| 1966 | William Jewell | 6–3 | 2–0 | T–1st | |
| 1967 | William Jewell | 10–0–1 | 2–0 | T–1st | T Mineral Water |
| William Jewell: | | 133–33–9 | 50–5–3 | | |
| Total: | | 133–33–9 | | | |
National championship Conference title Conference division title or championship game berth

== See also ==
- List of college football career coaching winning percentage leaders
