= Brandon Moore (American football coach) =

American football player and coach (born 1979)

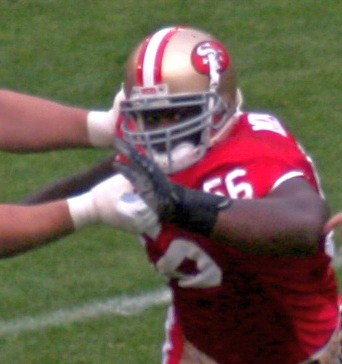
- Moore with the San Francisco 49ers in 2007

San Diego Toreros
- Title: Head coach

Personal information
- Born: January 16, 1979 (age 47); East Meadow, New York, U.S.
- Listed height: 6 ft 1 in (1.85 m)
- Listed weight: 240 lb (109 kg)

Career information
- High school: Baldwin (Baldwin, New York)
- College: Oklahoma
- NFL draft: 2002: undrafted

Career history

Playing
- San Francisco 49ers (2002)*; New England Patriots (2002)*; San Francisco 49ers (2002–2007); Arizona Cardinals (2008)*; Las Vegas Locomotives (2009–2010); San Diego Chargers (2010); Las Vegas Locomotives (2011)
- * Offseason or practice squad member only

Coaching
- Scottsdale CC (2012–2015) Defensive coordinator & linebackers coach; Colorado Mines (2016–2017) Linebackers coach; Colorado Mines (2018–2019) Co-defensive coordinator & linebackers coach; Colorado Mines (2020–2021) Defensive coordinator & linebackers coach; Colorado Mines (2022) Head coach; San Diego (2023–present) Head coach

Awards and highlights
- 2× UFL champion (2009, 2010); BCS national champion (2001); AFCA Division II Coach of the Year (2022)

Career NFL statistics
- Total tackles: 249
- Sacks: 15
- Forced fumbles: 4
- Fumble recoveries: 1
- Interceptions: 1
- Stats at Pro Football Reference

Head coaching record
- Regular season: 36–22

Brandon T. Moore (born January 16, 1979) is an American college football coach and former professional player who is the head coach of the San Diego Toreros football team at the University of San Diego (USD). A former National Football League (NFL) linebacker, he was signed by the San Francisco 49ers as an undrafted free agent following the 2002 NFL draft. Moore played college football at Oklahoma.

Moore has also been a member of the New England Patriots, Arizona Cardinals, Las Vegas Locomotives and San Diego Chargers.

== Professional career ==
Pre-draft measurables
Height	Weight	Arm length	Hand span	40-yard dash	Vertical jump	Broad jump	Bench press
6 ft 1 1/8 in (1.86 m)	239 lb (108 kg)	31 1/2 in (0.80 m)	9 1/4 in (0.23 m)	4.61 s	36.5 in (0.93 m)	9 ft 5 in (2.87 m)	23 reps
All values from NFL Combine

=== San Francisco 49ers ===
Moore was signed by the San Francisco 49ers as an undrafted free agent in the 2002 NFL draft. In 2006, Moore started 11 games and led the team in tackles (92) and sacks (6.5), playing inside and outside linebacker in the 49ers' 3-4 scheme. Moore struggled the next year and was demoted to second string, coming in mostly as a situational pass rusher. He was released on August 10, 2008.

=== Arizona Cardinals ===
On August 12, 2008, he was signed by the Arizona Cardinals. He was later released on August 30, 2008, during final cuts.

=== Las Vegas Locomotives ===
Moore was drafted by the Las Vegas Locomotives of the United Football League and signed with the team on August 5, 2009. Moore was a starter for the Locomotives, and won UFL championship titles both seasons that he was a member of the franchise.

=== San Diego Chargers ===
On December 21, 2010, the San Diego Chargers signed Moore to a one-year deal.

== Coaching career ==
=== Colorado Mines ===
Moore was the Orediggers' defensive coordinator and linebackers coach leading up to his promotion on February 2, 2022, where he took on the role of head coach previously held by Gregg Brandon. In his first season, he led the Orediggers to an unbeaten season in Rocky Mountain Athletic Conference play and a run in the NCAA Division II playoffs that ended in a championship-game loss to Ferris State. After the season, he was named by the American Football Coaches Association as its Division II Coach of the Year.

=== San Diego ===
On April 19, 2023, Moore was hired to be the head coach for the University of San Diego Toreros.

== Personal life ==
Moore is the younger brother of former NFL wide receiver Rob Moore.

== Head coaching record ==
Year	Team	Overall	Conference	Standing	Bowl/playoffs	AFCA^{#}
Colorado Mines Orediggers (Rocky Mountain Athletic Conference) (2022)
2022	Colorado Mines	13–3	9–0	1st	L NCAA Division II Championship	2
Colorado Mines:		13–3	9–0			
San Diego Toreros (Pioneer Football League) (2023–present)
2023	San Diego	4–7	4–4	T–5th		
2024	San Diego	8–3	6–2	2nd		
2025	San Diego	8–4	6–2	T-2nd		
2026	San Diego	3–5	2–3			
San Diego:		23–19	18–11			
Total:		36–22				
National championship Conference title Conference division title or championship game berth
