= 2012 St. Norbert Green Knights football team =

College football season

2012 St. Norbert Green Knights football

MWC co-champion

NCAA Division III First Round, L 17–48 at St. Thomas (MN)
- Conference: Midwest Conference
- Record: 8–3 (8–1 MWC)
- Head coach: Jim Purtill (14th season)
- Home stadium: Schneider Stadium

2012 Midwest Conference football standings
	Conf.			Overall
Team	W		L	W		L
Lake Forest +	8	–	1	8	–	2
St. Norbert +^	8	–	1	8	–	3
Carroll (WI)	7	–	2	8	–	2
Illinois College	7	–	2	8	–	2
Monmouth (IL)	5	–	4	5	–	5
Ripon	5	–	4	5	–	5
Cornell (IA)	4	–	5	4	–	6
Grinnell	2	–	7	2	–	8
Knox	2	–	7	2	–	8
Lawrence	2	–	8	2	–	8
Beloit	0	–	9	0	–	10
+ – Conference co-champions; ^ – NCAA Division III playoff participant

The 2012 St. Norbert Green Knights football team represented St. Norbert College as a member of the Midwest Conference (MWC) during the 2012 NCAA Division III football season. They were led by 14th-year head coach Jim Purtill and play their home games at Schneider Stadium in De Pere, Wisconsin. The Green Knights compiled and overall record of 8–3 with a mark of 8–1 in conference play, sharing the MWC title with Lake Forest. St. Norbert advanced to the NCAA Division III Football Championship playoffs, where the lost to the St. Thomas Tommies in the first round.

On August 31, St. Norbert played their season opener against John Carroll at Donnybrook Stadium in Dublin, Ireland. The game was played as part of the 2012 Global Ireland Football Tournament. It marked the first time in 20 years that an NCAA Division III regular season football game was played in Europe.

== Schedule ==
Date	Time	Opponent	Site	Result
August 31	1:30 pm	vs. John Carroll*	Donnybrook Stadium; Dublin, Ireland	L 3–40
September 8	1:00 pm	Knox	Schneider Stadium; De Pere, WI	W 31–20
September 15	1:00 pm	at Ripon	Ingalls Field; Ripon, WI	W 35–31
September 22	1:00 pm	Carroll (WI)	Schneider Stadium; De Pere, WI	W 28–21 ^{OT}
September 29	1:00 pm	at Monmouth (IL)	Monmouth, IL	L 9–31
October 6	2:00 pm	at Cornell	Mount Vernon, IA	W 20–16
October 13	1:00 pm	Lawrence^{†}	Schneider Stadium; De Pere, WI	W 79–7
October 27	1:00 pm	at Beloit	Beloit, WI	W 42–7
November 3	1:00 pm	at Grinnell	Rosenbloom Field; Grinnell, IA	W 20–12
November 10	1:00 pm	Lake Forest	Schneider Stadium; De Pere, WI	W 20–10
November 17	12:00 pm	at No. 4 St. Thomas (MN)*	O'Shaughnessy Stadium; Saint Paul, MN (NCAA Division III First Round)	L 17–48
*Non-conference game; ^{†}Homecoming; Rankings from D3football.com Poll released prior to the game; All times are in Central time
