= Chad Braun =

American football coach (born c. 1972)

Current position
- Title: Head coach
- Team: Monmouth (IL)
- Conference: MWC
- Record: 84–21

Biographical details
- Born: c. 1972 (age 53–54); Aurora, Illinois, U.S.
- Education: Illinois College (1995); Western Illinois University (2003)

Playing career
- 1991–1994: Illinois College

Coaching career (HC unless noted)
- 1994–1996: Jacksonville HS (IL) (assistant)
- 1997–1999: MacMurray (assistant)
- 2000–2014: Monmouth (IL) (DC)
- 2015–present: Monmouth (IL)

Head coaching record
- Overall: 84–21
- Bowls: 1–1
- Tournaments: 0–3 (NCAA D-III playoffs)

Accomplishments and honors

Championships
- 6 MWC (2016–2017, 2019, 2022–2023, 2025); 4 MWC South Division (2015 2017–2019)

Awards
- 5× MWC Coach of the Year (2015–2019)

Chad Braun (born c. 1972) is an American college football coach. He is the head football coach for Monmouth College, a position he has held since 2015. He also coached for Jacksonville High School, and MacMurray. He played college football for Illinois College.

== Head coaching record ==
Year	Team	Overall	Conference	Standing	Bowl/playoffs	D3^{#}	AFCA^{°}
Monmouth Fighting Scots (Midwest Conference) (2015–present)
2015	Monmouth	8–2	5–0	1st (South)			
2016	Monmouth	10–1	8–0	1st	L NCAA Division III First Round	21	
2017	Monmouth	9–2	5–0	1st (South)	L NCAA Division III First Round		
2018	Monmouth	8–2	5–0	1st (South)			
2019	Monmouth	7–3	4–0	1st (South)			
2020–21	No team—COVID-19						
2021	Monmouth	8–2	8–1	2nd			
2022	Monmouth	8–2	8–1	T–1st			
2023	Monmouth	9–2	8–1	T–1st	W Lakefront		
2024	Monmouth	8–3	8–1	2nd	L Lakefront		
2025	Monmouth	9–2	9–0	1st	L NCAA Division III Second Round	25	23
2026	Monmouth	0–0	0–0				
Monmouth:		84–21	68–4				
Total:		84–21					
National championship Conference title Conference division title or championship game berth
