= Rod Sandberg =

American football player and coach

Current position
- Title: Head coach
- Team: Whitworth
- Conference: NWC
- Record: 92–27

Biographical details
- Born: c. 1969 (age 56–57)

Playing career
- 1987–1990: Wheaton (IL)
- Position: Defensive back

Coaching career (HC unless noted)
- 1991: Aurora (assistant)
- 1993–1994: Georgetown (KY) (assistant)
- 1995–2002: Wheaton (IL) (LB)
- 2003–2013: Wheaton (IL) (DC)
- 2014–present: Whitworth

Head coaching record
- Overall: 92–27
- Tournaments: 3–5 (NCAA D-III playoffs)

Accomplishments and honors

Championships
- 4 NWC (2018, 2020, 2023, 2025)

Rod Sandberg (born c. 1969) is an American college football coach and former player. He is the head football coach for Whitworth University, a position he has held since 2014.

Sandberg played college football as a defensive back at Wheaton College in Wheaton, Illinois from 1987 to 1990. He began his coaching career in 1991 as an assistant at Aurora University in Aurora, Illinois and spent 1993 and 1994 as an assistant coach at Georgetown College in Georgetown, Kentucky. Sandberg returned to Wheaton in 1995 as linebackers coach and was promoted to defensive coordinator in 2003.

Sandberg was hired by Whitworth in December 2013 to succeed John Tully as head football coach. He was selected over Chris Tormey, who had been the head football coach at University of Idaho and the University of Nevada, and John Sala, the head football coach at Louisburg College, a junior college in Louisburg, North Carolina.

== Head coaching record ==
Year	Team	Overall	Conference	Standing	Bowl/playoffs	D3^{#}	AFCA^{°}
Whitworth Pirates (Northwest Conference) (2014–present)
2014	Whitworth	6–4	4–3	4th			
2015	Whitworth	9–2	6–1	2nd	L NCAA Division III First Round	20	
2016	Whitworth	8–2	6–1	2nd			
2017	Whitworth	8–2	5–2	T–2nd			
2018	Whitworth	10–1	7–0	1st	L NCAA Division III Second Round	10	
2019	Whitworth	6–3	5–2	2nd			
2020–21	Whitworth	4–0	4–0	1st			
2021	Whitworth	7–3	4–3	4th			
2022	Whitworth	6–4	4–3	T–4th			
2023	Whitworth	10–1	7–0	1st	L NCAA Division III Second Round	17	16
2024	Whitworth	10–2	6–1	2nd	L NCAA Division III Second Round	16	10
2025	Whitworth	8–3	7–0	1st	L NCAA Division III First Round		
2026	Whitworth	0–0	0–0				
Whitworth:		92–27	65–16				
Total:		92–27					
National championship Conference title Conference division title or championship game berth
