= 2021 NCAA Division II Football Championship Game =

2021 NCAA Division II Football Championship
Valdosta State Blazers	Ferris State Bulldogs
(12–1)	(13–0)
GSC	GLIAC
17	58
Head coach: Gary Goff	Head coach: Tony Annese
Seed 2	Seed 1
	1	2	3	4	Total
Valdosta State	17	0	0	0	17
Ferris State	20	21	17	0	58
- Date: December 18, 2021
- Season: 2021
- Stadium: McKinney ISD Stadium
- Location: McKinney, Texas
- Referee: Greg Gompf
- Attendance: 3,933

United States TV coverage
- Network: ESPNU

The 2021 NCAA Division II Football Championship Game was a postseason college football game that determined a national champion in NCAA Division II for the 2021 season. It was played at McKinney ISD Stadium in McKinney, Texas, on December 18, 2021, with kickoff at 9:00 p.m. EST (8:00 p.m. local CST), and television coverage on ESPNU.

The championship featured the top-seeded Ferris State Bulldogs from the Great Lakes Intercollegiate Athletic Conference easily defeating the second-seed Valdosta State from the Gulf South Conference, 58–17. The win gave Ferris State their football program's first national championship.

== Teams ==
The participants of the 2021 NCAA Division II Football Championship Game were the finalists of the 2021 Division II Playoffs, which began with four 7-team brackets to determine super region champions, who then qualified for the national semifinals. The 2021 game featured the winners of those national semifinal games: No. 2 seed Valdosta State and No. 1 seed Ferris State. This was the second meeting between the two teams. The first meeting was for the 2018 Championship game, which Valdosta State defeated Ferris State by two points, 49–47. This was Ferris State's second championship game appearance, and Valdosta State's fifth; the Blazers were 4–1 in previous appearances.

=== National semifinals ===
Super region champions were seeded 1 to 4 for the national semifinals.

Semifinals; December 11; Hosted by higher seeded team
1	Ferris State	55
4	Shepherd	7
2	Valdosta State	34
3	Colorado Mines	31

National Championship; December 18; McKinney ISD Stadium, McKinney, TX
1	Ferris State	58
2	Valdosta State	17

== Game summary ==
2021 NCAA Division II Football Championship Game

Quarter	1	2	3	4	Total
No. 2 Valdosta State	17	0	0	0	17
No. 1 Ferris State	20	21	17	0	58

at McKinney ISD Stadium • McKinney, Texas

- Date: Saturday, December 18, 2018
- Game time: 9:00 p.m. EST (8:00 p.m. CST)
- Game weather: 42, Sunny, Wind N @ 7 mph
- Game attendance: 3,933
- Referee: Greg Gompf
- TV announcers (ESPNU): Drew Carter, Kelly Stouffer and Kris Budden
- ESPN game summary

Game information

First quarter

- (13:09) FSU – Jared Bernhardt 56 yard rush, Sy Barnett kick failed (Drive: 1 play, 56 yards, 0:11; Ferris State 6–0)
- (7:58) VSU – Seth McGill 18 yard pass from Ivory Durham, Estin Thiele kick (Drive: 13 plays, 75 yards, 5:11; Valdosta State 7–6)
- (6:37) FSU – Jared Bernhardt 5 yard rush, Sy Barnett kick (Drive: 3 plays, 60 yards, 1:21; Ferris State 13–7)
- (3:44) VSU – Travon Roberts 8 yard pass from Ivory Durham, Estin Thiele kick (Drive: 6 plays, 77 yards, 2:53; Valdosta State 14–13)
- (2:47) VSU – Estin Thiele 25 yard kick (Drive: 4 plays, 1 yards, 0:47; Valdosta State 17–13)
- (1:55) FSU – Jeremy Burrell 78 yard rush, Sy Barnett kick (Drive: 2 plays, 75 yards, 0:52; Ferris State 20–17)

Second quarter

- (9:18) FSU – Jared Bernhardt 2 yard rush, Sy Barnett kick (Drive: 10 plays, 44 yards, 4:14; Ferris State 27–17)
- (1:36) FSU – Tyler Minor 1 yard rush, Sy Barnett kick (Drive: 9 plays, 80 yards, 4:44; Ferris State 34–17)
- (0:11) FSU – Tyrese Hunt-Thompson 47 yard pass from Mylik Mitchell, Sy Barnett kick (Drive: 2 plays, 37 yards, 0:44; Ferris State 41–17)

Third quarter

- (7:53) FSU – Sy Barnett 32 yard kick (Drive: 4 plays, 5 yards, 2:06; Ferris State 44–17)
- (3:44) FSU – Evan Cummins 1 yard rush, Sy Barnett kick (Drive: 5 plays, 80 yards, 2:11; Ferris State 51–17)
- (1:33) FSU – Liam Daly 37 yard interception return, Sy Barnett kick (Drive: 5 plays, 22 yards, 2:11; Ferris State 58–17)

=== Statistics ===
Statistics	VAL	FSU
First downs	18	19
Total yards	268	581
Rushing yards	110	459
Passing yards	158	122
Turnovers	3	2
Time of possession	28:53	31:07

Team	Category	Player	Statistics
Valdosta State	Passing	Ivory Durham	14/34, 158 yards, 2 TD, 2 INT
Valdosta State	Rushing	Ivory Durham	13 carries, 45 yards
Valdosta State	Receiving	Brian Saunds	3 receptions, 64 yards
Ferris State	Passing	Mylik Mitchell	3/6, 122 yards, 1 TD
Ferris State	Rushing	Jared Bernhardt	14 carries, 148 yards, 3 TD
Ferris State	Receiving	Xavier Wade	1 receptions, 72 yards
