= 2022 NCAA Division II Football Championship Game =

Postseason college football game

2022 NCAA Division II Football Championship
Colorado Mines Orediggers	Ferris State Bulldogs
(13–3)	(14–1)
RMAC	GLIAC
14	41
Head coach: Brandon Moore	Head coach: Tony Annese
Seed 2	Seed 1
	1	2	3	4	Total
Colorado Mines	0	0	7	7	14
Ferris State	7	20	0	14	41
- Date: December 17, 2022
- Season: 2022
- Stadium: McKinney ISD Stadium
- Location: McKinney, Texas
- Attendance: 6,333

United States TV coverage
- Network: ESPNU

The 2022 NCAA Division II Football Championship Game was a college football game played on December 17, 2022, at McKinney ISD Stadium in McKinney, Texas. The game determined the national champion of NCAA Division II for the 2022 season. The game was scheduled to begin at 12:00 p.m. CST and was broadcast by ESPNU.

The game featured the two finalists of the 28-team playoff bracket, which began on November 19, 2022. The top-seeded Ferris State Bulldogs from the Great Lakes Intercollegiate Athletic Conference (GLIAC) defeated the second seed Colorado Mines Orediggers from the Rocky Mountain Athletic Conference (RMAC), 41–14. The win gave the Ferris football program its second national championship.

== Teams ==
The participants of the 2022 NCAA Division II Football Championship Game were the finalists of the 2022 Division II Playoffs, which began on November 19 with four 7-team brackets to determine super region champions, who then qualified for the national semifinals.

=== National semifinals ===
Super region champions were reseeded 1 to 4 for the national semifinals.

Semifinals; December 10; Hosted by higher seeded team
1	Ferris State	38
4	West Florida	17
2	Colorado Mines	44
3	Shepherd	17

National Championship; December 17; McKinney ISD Stadium, McKinney, TX
1	Ferris State	41
2	Colorado Mines	14

== Game summary ==
2022 NCAA Division II Football Championship Game

Quarter	1	2	3	4	Total
No. 2 Colorado Mines	0	0	7	7	14
No. 1 Ferris State	7	20	0	14	41

at McKinney ISD Stadium • McKinney, Texas

- Date: Saturday, December 17, 2022
- Game time: 12:00 p.m. CST
- Game attendance: 6,333
- TV: ESPNU

Scoring summary

Quarter	Time	Drive			Team	Scoring information	Score	
Quarter	Time	Plays	Yards	TOP	Team	Scoring information	Colorado Mines	Ferris State
1	11:21	7	79	3:39	Ferris State	Carson Gulker 2-yard touchdown run, Eddie Jewett kick good	0	7
2	13:16	8	41	2:47	Ferris State	33-yard field goal by Eddie Jewett	0	10
2	8:56	5	52	2:15	Ferris State	22-yard field goal by Eddie Jewett	0	13
2	0:32	8	75	4:23	Ferris State	CJ Jefferson 19-yard touchdown run, Eddie Jewett kick good	0	20
2	0:23	1	0	0:09	Ferris State	Sidney McCloud 31 yard Interception Return for Touchdown, Eddie Jewett Kick good	0	27
3	1:02	9	85	2:51	Colorado Mines	Michael Zeman 10-yard touchdown reception from John Matocha, Jacob Click kick good	7	27
4	12:12	9	75	3:50	Ferris State	Carson Gulker 1-yard touchdown run, Eddie Jewett kick good	7	34
4	6:24	3	53	0:57	Colorado Mines	Josh Johnston 14-yard touchdown reception from John Matocha, Jacob Click kick good	14	34
4	4:24	4	37	2:00	Ferris State	Carson Gulker 6-yard touchdown run, Eddie Jewett kick good	14	41
"TOP" = time of possession. For other American football terms, see Glossary of American football.							14	41

== Statistics ==
Team statistical comparison
Statistic	Colorado Mines	Ferris State
First downs	15	21
First downs rushing	2	11
First downs passing	10	9
First downs penalty	3	1
Third down efficiency	1–11	7–15
Fourth down efficiency	1–2	0–0
Total plays–net yards	57–261	69–485
Rushing attempts–net yards	19–4	50–214
Yards per rush	0.2	4.3
Yards passing	208	218
Pass completions–attempts	22–38	15–19
Interceptions thrown	2	0
Punt returns–total yards	1–4	2–11
Kickoff returns–total yards	4–45	1–14
Punts–average yardage	7–34.86	5–37.2
Fumbles–lost	1–0	4–1
Penalties–yards	6–50	10–83
Time of possession	23:43	36:17

Colorado Mines statistics
Orediggers passing
	C–A	Yds	TD–INT
John Matocha	22/38	208	2–2
Team	22/38	208	2–2
Orediggers rushing
	Car	Yds	TD
Michael Zeman	8	26	0
John Matocha	11	−22	0
Team	19	4	0
Orediggers receiving
	Rec	Yds	TD
Josh Johnston	6	85	1
Tristan Smith	6	42	0
Max McLeod	4	30	0
Michael Zeman	3	26	1
Mason Karp	3	25	0
Team	22	208	2

Ferris State statistics
Bulldogs passing
	C–A	Yds	TD–INT
Mylik Mitchell	14/18	170	0–0
Brady Rose	1/1	48	0–0
Team	15/19	218	0–0
Bulldogs rushing
	Car	Yds	TD
Marcus Taylor	13	103	0
Brady Rose	6	39	0
CJ Jefferson	4	24	1
Carson Gulker	8	18	3
Mylik Mitchell	12	12	0
Emari O'Brien	1	9	0
Zamir Lundy-Knighten	1	8	0
Evan Cummins	1	4	0
James Coby	0	3	0
Team	4	−6	0
Team	50	214	4
Bulldogs receiving
	Rec	Yds	TD
Brady Rose	5	83	0
CJ Jefferson	6	71	0
Marcus Taylor	1	33	0
Dezmin Lyburtus	3	31	0
Team	15	218	'0
