= Ferris State Bulldogs football =

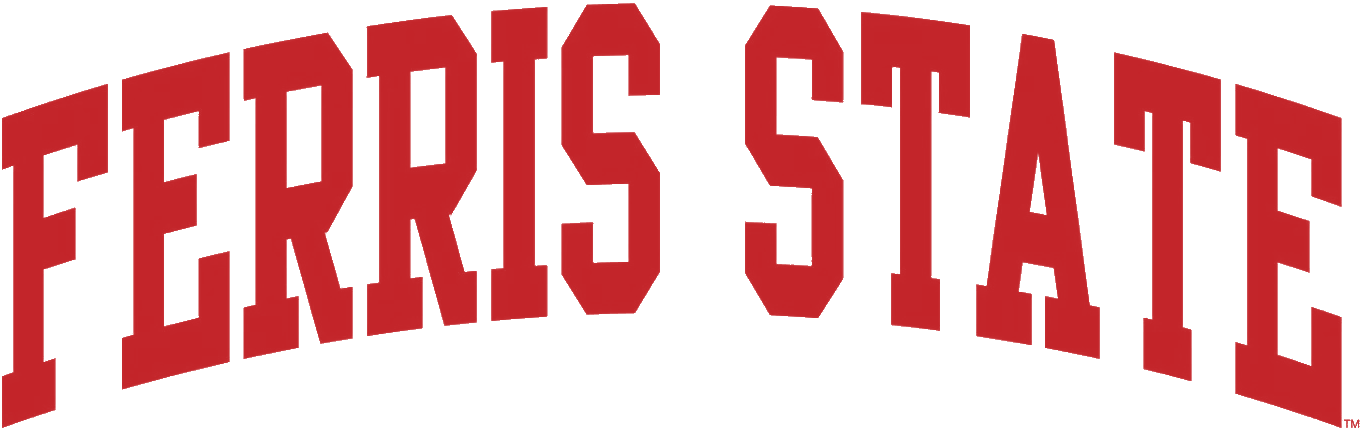
- First season: 1900; 126 years ago
- Athletic director: Steve Brockelbank
- Head coach: Tony Annese; 13th season, 153–21 (.879)
- Location: Big Rapids, Michigan
- Stadium: Top Taggart Field (capacity: 6,200)
- NCAA division: Division II
- Conference: GLIAC
- Colors: Crimson and gold

NCAA Division II championships
- 2021, 2022, 2024, 2025

College Football Playoff appearances
- NCAA Division II: 1992, 1993, 1994, 1995, 1996, 2014, 2015, 2016, 2017, 2018, 2019, 2021, 2022, 2023, 2024, 2025

Conference championships
- MOCC: 1937 GLIAC: 1974, 1992, 1993, 1994, 1995, 1996, 1999, 2014, 2015, 2018, 2019, 2021, 2024, 2025
- Website: ferrisstatebulldogs.com/fball

The Ferris State Bulldogs football team represents Ferris State University in NCAA Division II college football. The Bulldogs began playing football in 1900, and compete as members of the Great Lakes Intercollegiate Athletic Conference (GLIAC). Ferris State's home games are played on campus at Top Taggart Field located in Big Rapids, Michigan.

Ferris State has won four NCAA Division II football championships, in 2021, 2022, 2024 and 2025. The 2018 team also advanced to the NCAA Division II national championship game, losing by two points to Valdosta State. In 13 seasons under head coach Tony Annese (2012–2019, 2021–2025), the Bulldogs have compiled a 153–21 record and have been ranked among the top ten Division II teams every year since 2015.

On November 7, 2026, following an 80–0 win over conference opponent Wayne State, the Bulldogs won their 40th consecutive game, tying the all time Division II record set by rival Grand Valley State from 2005–07.

The very next week on November 14, they would beat Roosevelt 63–20, breaking said record with their 41st game.

== Conference history ==
- 1899–1937: Independent
- 1938–1941: Michigan-Ontario Collegiate Conference
- 1946–1955: Independent
- 1956–1973: NAIA independent
- 1974–1989: Great Lakes Intercollegiate Athletic Conference
- 1990–1998: Midwest Intercollegiate Football Conference
- 1999–present: Great Lakes Intercollegiate Athletic Conference

== Championships ==
=== National championships ===
Year	Association	Division	Head coach	Record	Opponent	Result
2021	NCAA (4)	Division II (4)	Tony Annese	14–0 (7–0 GLIAC)	Valdosta State	W, 58–17
2022	NCAA (4)	Division II (4)	Tony Annese	14–1 (5–1 GLIAC)	Colorado Mines	W, 41–14
2024	NCAA (4)	Division II (4)	Tony Annese	14–1 (7–0 GLIAC)	Valdosta State	W, 49–14
2025	NCAA (4)	Division II (4)	Tony Annese	16–0 (7–0 GILAC)	Harding	W, 42–21

== Harlon Hill Trophy winners ==
Ferris State has three Harlon Hill Trophy winners as the Most Valuable Player in NCAA Division II football:

- 2014: Jason Vander Laan
- 2015: Jason Vander Laan
- 2018: Jayru Campbell

== Postseason appearances ==
=== NCAA Division II ===
The Bulldogs have made seventeen appearances in the NCAA Division II playoffs, with a combined record of 35–12.

Year	Round	Opponent	Result
1992	First Round; Quarterfinals	Edinboro; New Haven	W, 19–15; L, 13–35
1993	First Round	Indiana (PA)	L, 21–28
1994	First Round; Quarterfinals	West Chester; Indiana (PA)	W, 43–40; L, 17–21
1995	First Round; Quarterfinals; Semifinals	Millersville; New Haven; North Alabama	W, 36–26; W, 17–9; L, 7–45
1996	First Round; Quarterfinals	Indiana (PA); Clarion	W, 24–23; L, 21–23
2014	Second Round	Ohio Dominican	L, 33–46
2015	First Round; Second Round	Texas A&M–Commerce; Grand Valley State	W, 48–30; L, 34–38
2016	First Round; Second Round; Quarterfinals; Semifinals	Midwestern State; Colorado Mines; Grand Valley State; NW Missouri State	W, 65–34; W, 38–17; W, 47–32; L, 20–35
2017	First Round; Second Round; Quarterfinals	Ouachita Baptist; Fort Hays State; Harding	W, 24–19; W, 31–21; L, 14–16
2018	First Round; Second Round; Quarterfinals; Semifinals; National Championship	Harding; NW Missouri State; Ouachita Baptist; Minnesota State; Valdosta State	W, 21–19; W, 27–21; W, 37–14; W, 42–25; L, 47–49
2019	Second Round; Quarterfinals; Semifinals	Central Missouri; NW Missouri State; West Florida	W, 37–10; W, 25–3; L, 14–28
2021	Second Round; Quarterfinals; Semifinals; National Championship	Grand Valley State; NW Missouri State; Shepherd; Valdosta State	W, 54–20; W, 41–20; W, 55–7; W, 58–17
2022	First Round; Second Round; Quarterfinals; Semifinals; National Championship	Davenport; Pittsburg State; Grand Valley State; West Florida; Colorado Mines	W, 41–7; W, 17–14; W, 24–21; W, 38–17; W, 41–14
2023	First Round	Grand Valley State	L, 14–21
2024	Second Round; Quarterfinals; Semifinals; National Championship	Central Oklahoma; Harding; Slippery Rock; Valdosta State	W, 78–17; W, 41–7; W, 48–38; W, 49–14
2025	First Round; Second Round; Quarterfinals; Semifinals; National Championship	Northwood; Ashland; Minnesota State; Newberry; Harding	W, 65–14; W, 56–24; W, 52–29; W, 49–17; W, 42–21
2026	First Round	Truman	TBP

== Rivalries ==
=== Davenport ===
The Calder City Classic is the name given to the Davenport–Ferris State football rivalry. The winner of the game receives the Calder City Classic trophy, with the series and trophy named for Calder Plaza in Grand Rapids. The first game played under the Calder City Classic name was the 2024 match-up. Every third game in the series will be held at a neutral site in Grand Rapids.

=== Grand Valley State ===
The Anchor–Bone Classic is the name given to the Ferris State–Grand Valley State football rivalry. The first Anchor–Bone Classic was played in 2003 while the overall series dates back to 1972. The winning team receives the Anchor–Bone Trophy. Heading into the 2025 game, Ferris State leads the overall series while Grand Valley State leads the trophy series 14–12.

== Top Taggart Field ==
Top Taggart Field
- Location: 1215 Campus Drive; Big Rapids, Michigan
- Capacity: 6,200

Construction
- Opened: 1957

Top Taggart Field is an American football stadium located in Big Rapids, Michigan with a seating capacity of 6,200. Located on the campus of Ferris State University, it is the home venue for the Ferris State Bulldogs football team. The stadium is named after W. C. "Top" Taggart, a former halfback for the Bulldogs and the program's first official head coach. Top Taggart Field features the Wheeler Pavilion, a three-story facility located on the stadium's west side that features club rooms, media rooms, and a ticket office; construction began in 2001.

On August 29, 2024, university president Bill Pink announced plans to construct new residence halls that will wrap around the stadium behind the north end zone. The residence halls are expected to open in August 2026.
