= List of Cleveland Guardians first-round draft picks =

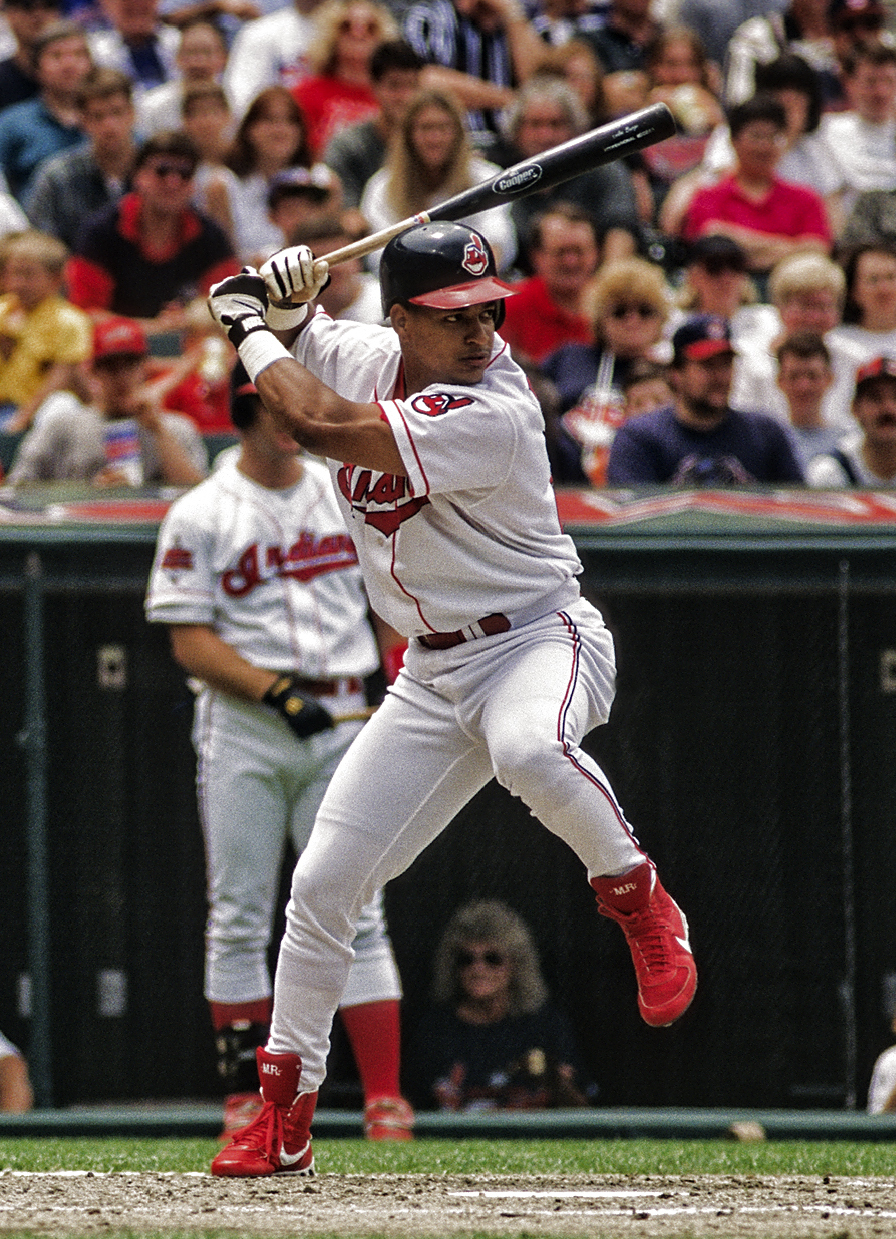
Manny Ramirez (1991) made four all-star appearances with the Indians and led the majors in runs batted in in 1999 with 165.

The Cleveland Guardians are a Major League Baseball (MLB) franchise based in Cleveland, Ohio. They play in the American League Central division. Since the institution of MLB's Rule 4 Draft, the Guardians have selected 71 players in the first round. Officially known as the "First-Year Player Draft", the Rule 4 Draft is MLB's primary mechanism for assigning amateur baseball players from high schools, colleges, and other amateur baseball clubs to its teams. The draft order is determined based on the previous season's standings, with the team possessing the worst record receiving the first pick. In addition, teams which lost free agents in the previous off-season may be awarded compensatory or supplementary picks.

Of the 71 players picked in the first round by Cleveland, 30 have been pitchers, the most of any position; 19 of them were right-handed, while 11 were left-handed. Sixteen outfielders, eleven shortstops, four third basemen, four first basemen, four catchers, and one second basemen were also taken. The team also drafted one player, Glenn Tufts (1973), who played as an infielder. Twelve of the players came from high schools or universities in the state of California, and Texas follows with eight players. The Guardians have also drafted two players from their home state of Ohio.

None of the Guardians' first-round picks have won a World Series championship with the team, and no pick has been elected to the Hall of Fame. None of these picks have won the MLB Rookie of the Year award, although Manny Ramirez (1991) placed second in the voting in 1994. CC Sabathia (1998) is the only first-round pick of the Guardians to earn a Cy Young Award with the team, winning in 2007. The Guardians have held the first overall pick in the draft once in 2024, and have selected players with the second overall pick five times.

The Guardians have made 11 selections in the supplemental round of the draft and 15 compensatory picks since the institution of the First-Year Player Draft in 1965. These additional picks are provided when a team loses a particularly valuable free agent in the previous off-season,^{[V]} or, more recently, if a team fails to sign a draft pick from the previous year. The Guardians have failed to sign three of their first-round picks: John Curtis (1966), Calvin Murray (1989), and Alan Horne (2001). They received no compensation for failing to sign Curtis, but received the 39th pick in 1990 and the 41st pick in 2002 for failing to sign Murray and Horne, respectively.

== Key ==
| Year | Each year links to an article about that year's Major League Baseball draft. |
| Position | Indicates the secondary/collegiate position at which the player was drafted, rather than the professional position the player may have gone on to play |
| Pick | Indicates the number of the pick |
| * | Player did not sign with the Indians |
| § | Indicates a supplemental pick |

== Picks ==
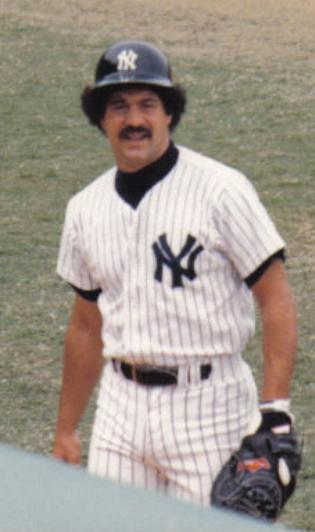
Rick Cerone (1975) is one of three catchers drafted in the first round by the Indians.

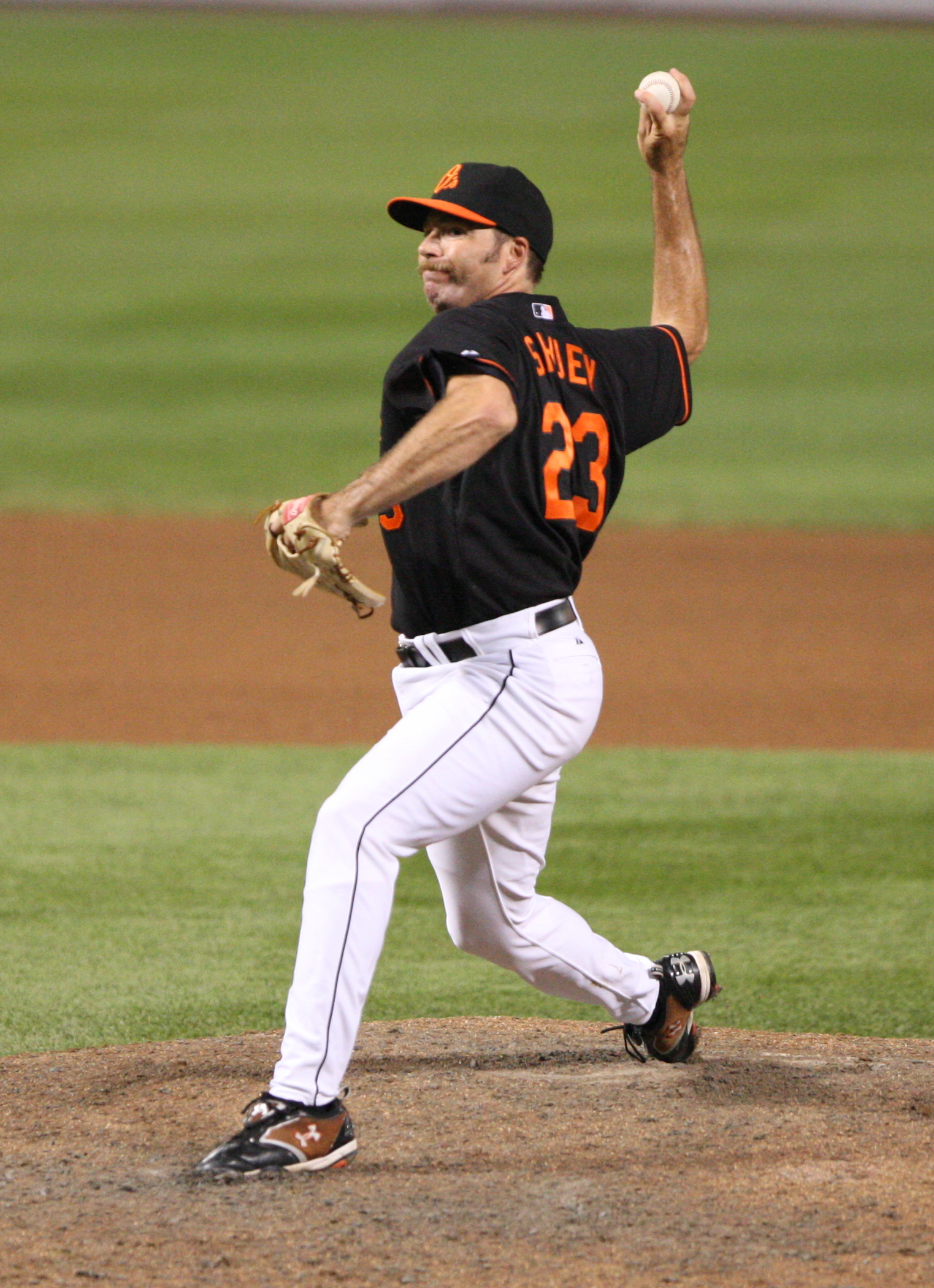
Paul Shuey (1992) is one of five players drafted with the second overall pick by the Indians.

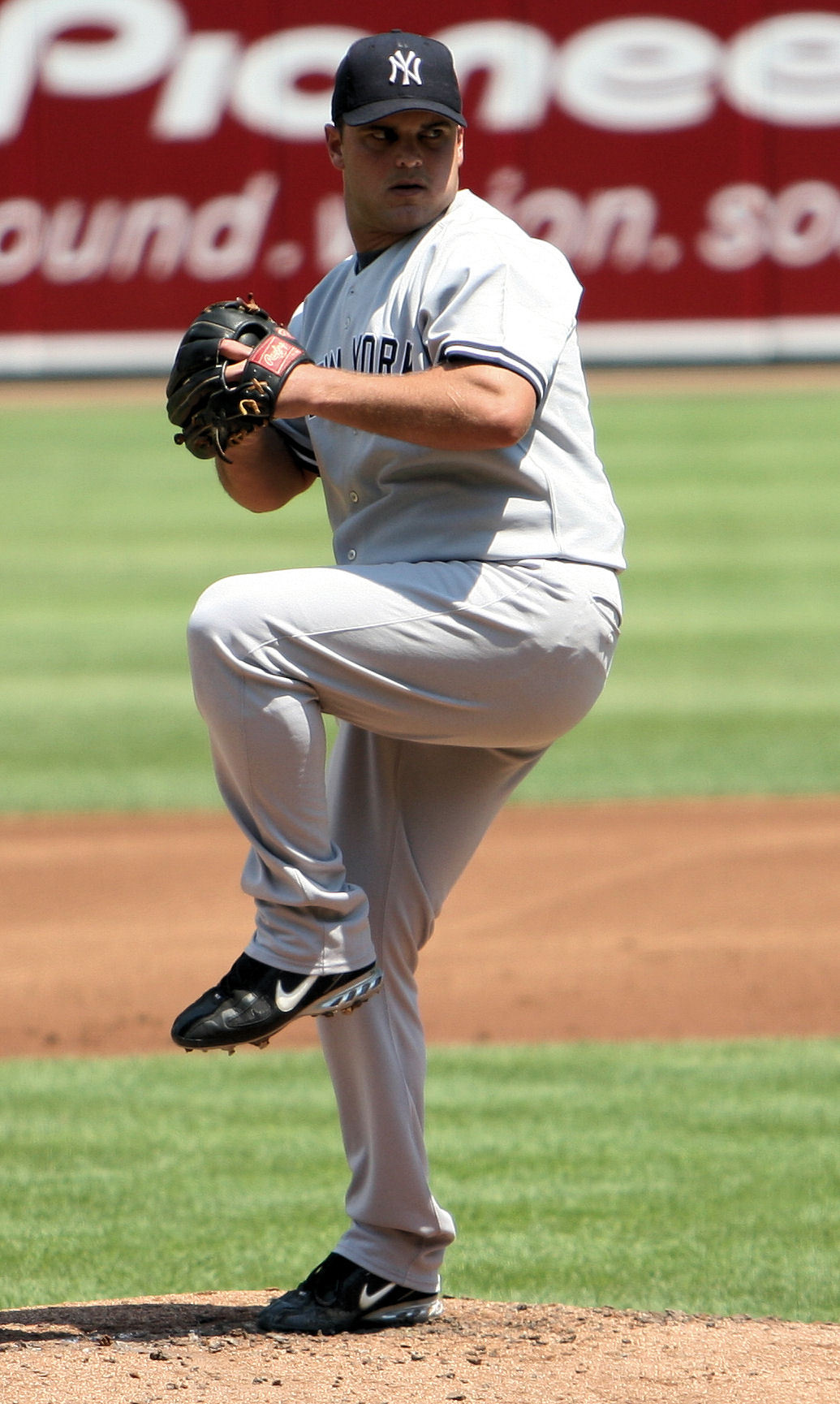
Jaret Wright (1994) is one of ten pitchers the Indians drafted from the state of California.

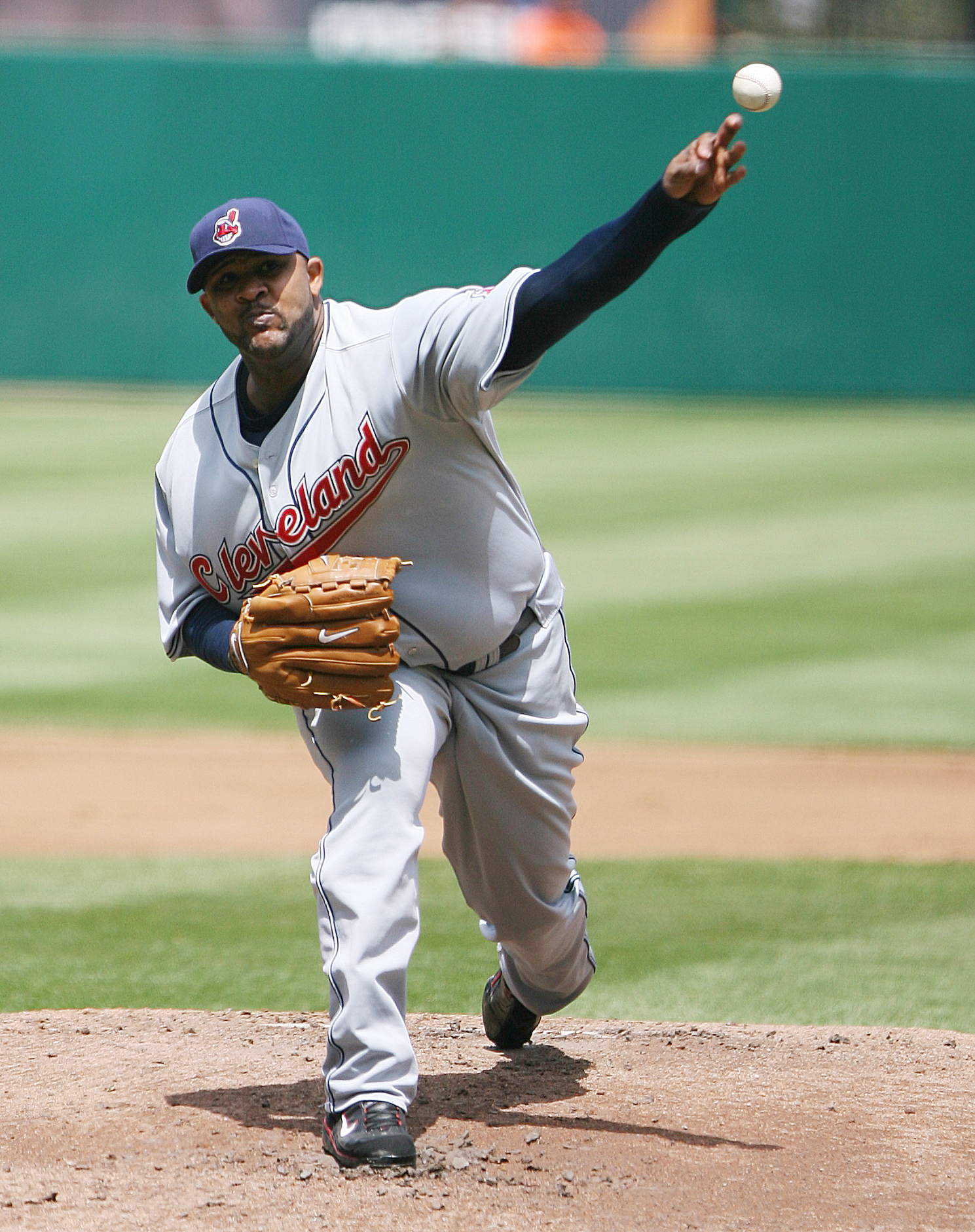
CC Sabathia (1998) is the only Indians first-round pick to win the Cy Young Award.

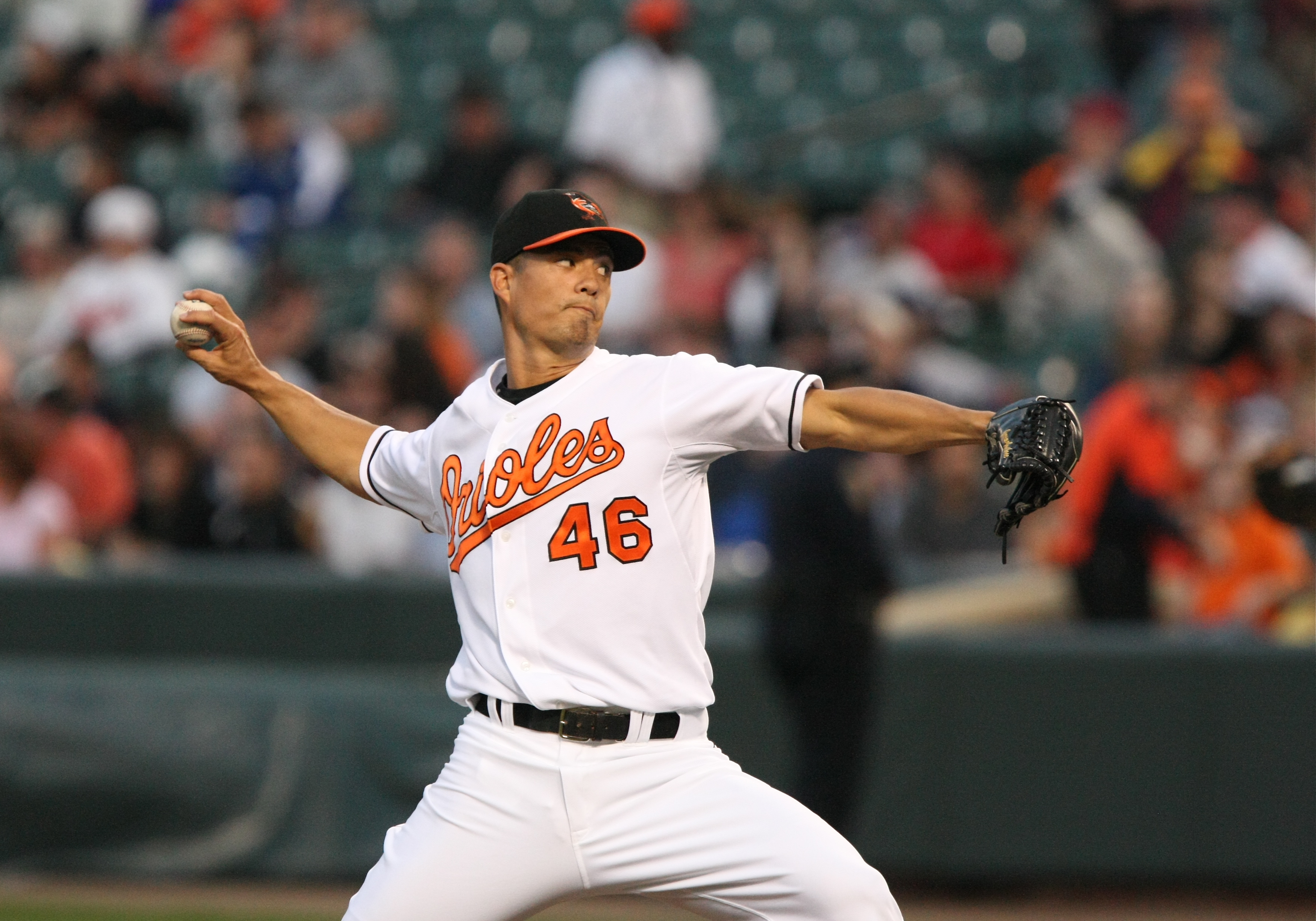
Jeremy Guthrie (2002) is one of two players drafted by the Indians from Stanford University.

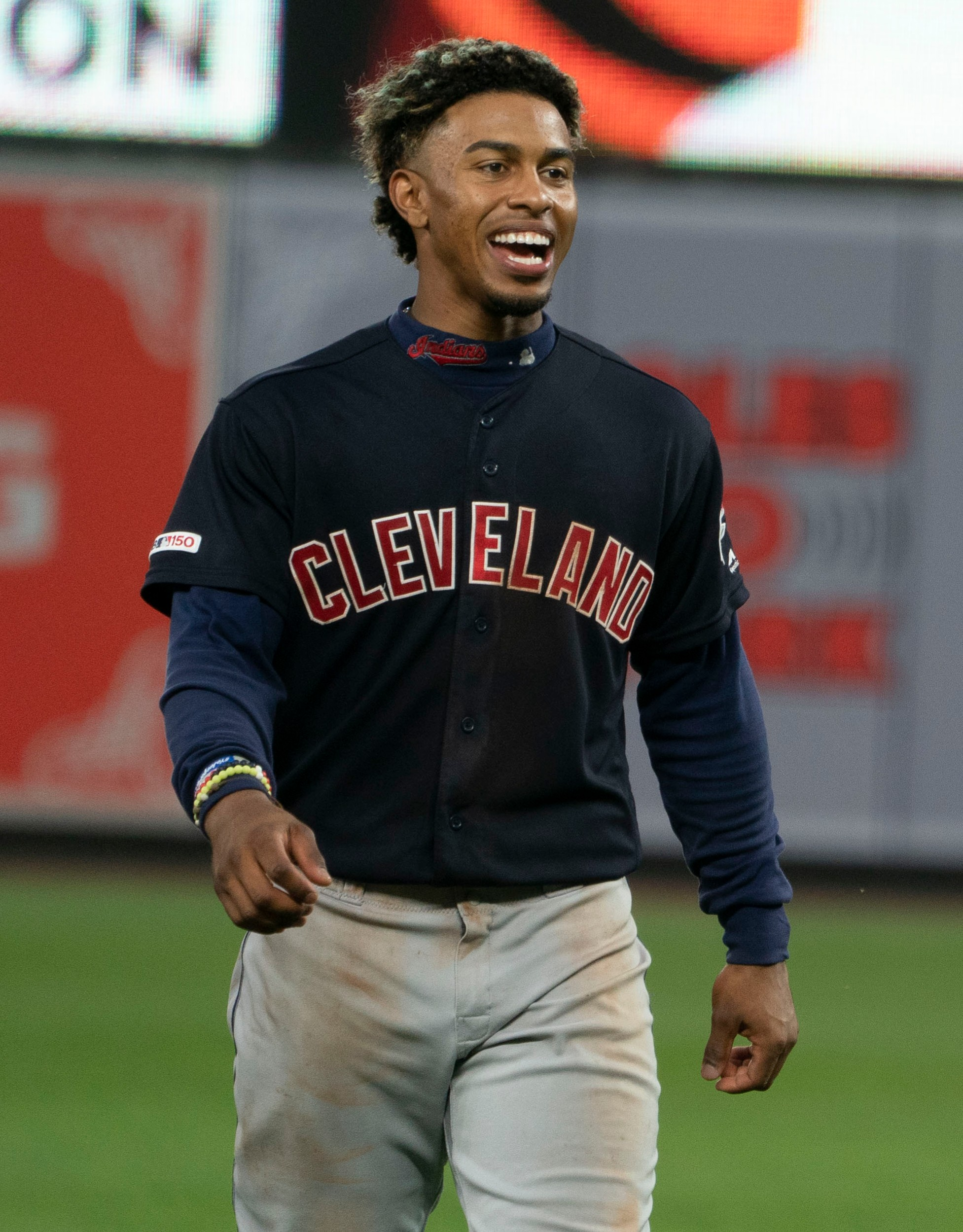
Francisco Lindor (2011) was selected with the eighth pick.

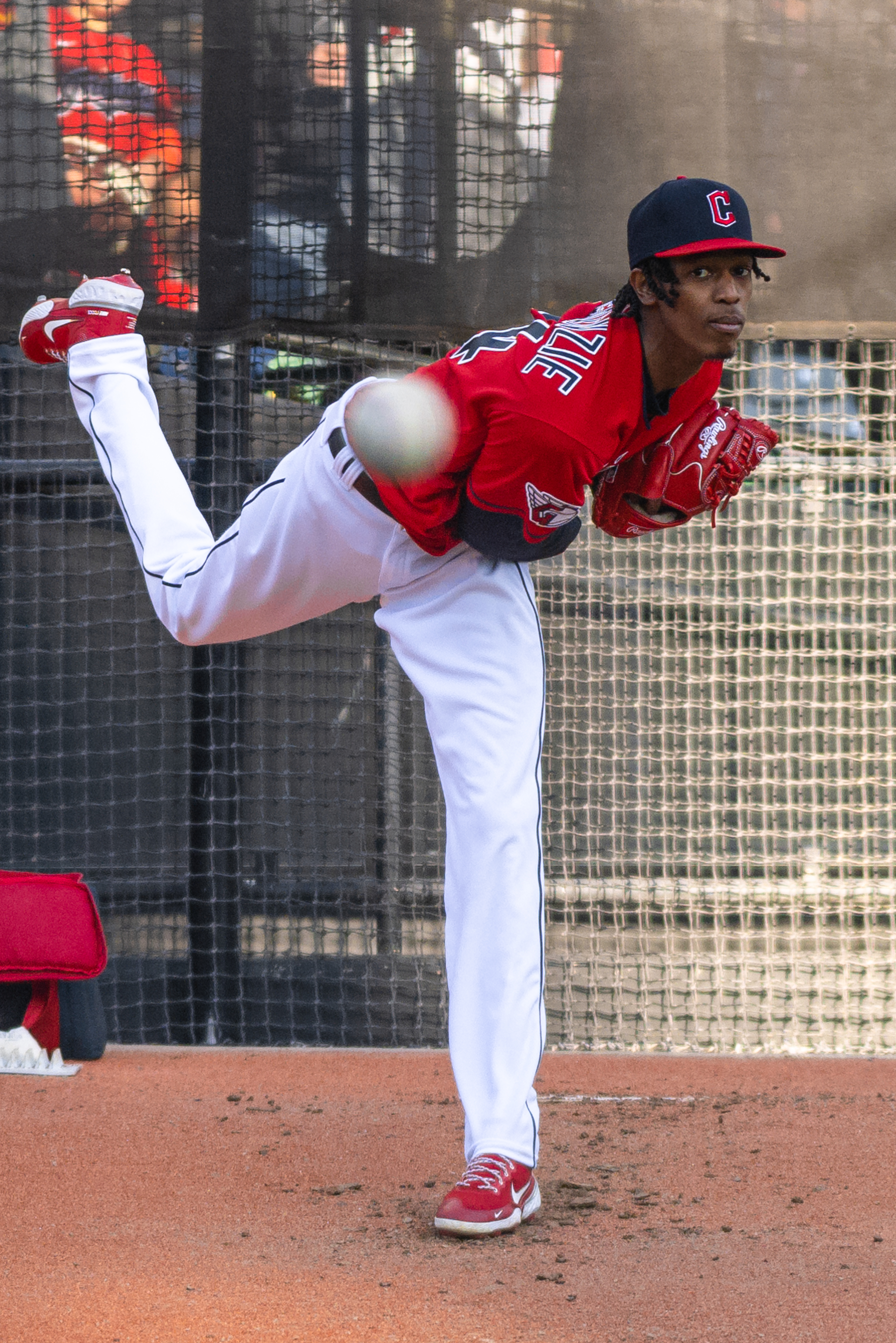
Triston McKenzie (2015) was selected with the 42nd pick.

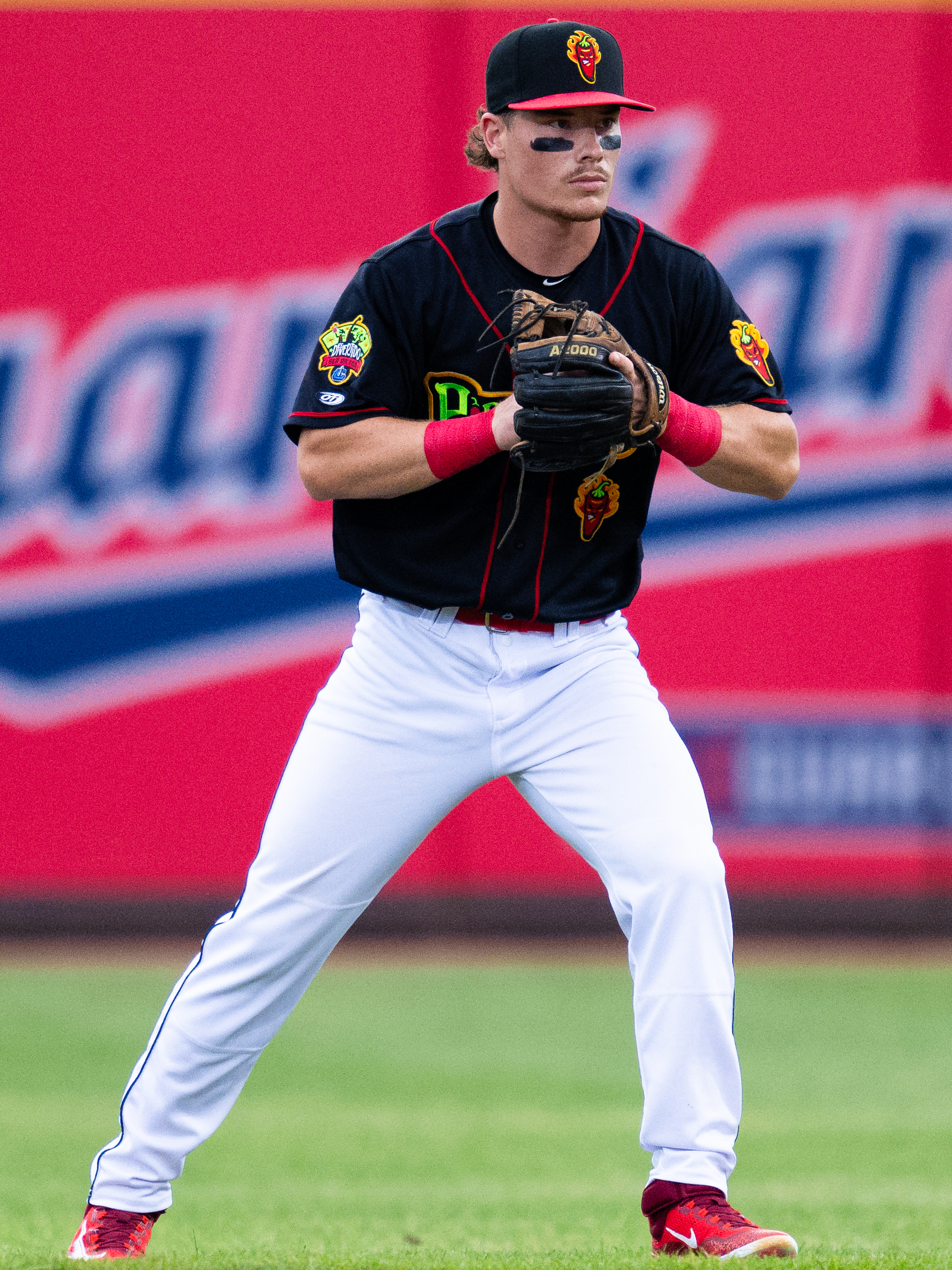
Travis Bazzana (2024) was the franchise's first first-overall draft pick.

| Year | Name | Position | School (location) | Pick | Ref |
|---|---|---|---|---|---|
| 1965 | Ray Fosse | Catcher | Marion High School (Marion, Illinois) | 7 | |
| 1966 | John Curtis* | Left-handed pitcher | Smithtown High School (Nesconset, New York) | 12 | |
| 1967 | Jack Heidemann | Shortstop | Brenham High School (Brenham, Texas) | 11 | |
| 1968 | Robert Weaver | Shortstop | Paxon High School (Jacksonville, Florida) | 6 | |
| 1969 | Alvin McGrew | Outfielder | Parker High School (Birmingham, Alabama) | 15 | |
| 1970 | Steve Dunning | Right-handed pitcher | Stanford University (Stanford, California) | 2 | |
| 1971 | David Sloan | Right-handed pitcher | Santa Clara High School (Santa Clara, California) | 9 | |
| 1972 | Rick Manning | Shortstop | LaSalle High School (Niagara Falls, New York) | 2 | |
| 1973 | Glenn Tufts | Infielder | Raynham High School (Bridgewater, Massachusetts) | 5 | |
| 1974 | Tom Brennan | Right-handed pitcher | Lewis University (Romeoville, Illinois) | 4 | |
| 1975 | Rick Cerone | Catcher | Seton Hall University (South Orange, New Jersey) | 7 | |
| 1976 | Tim Glass | Catcher | Springfield South High School (Springfield, Ohio) | 14 | |
| 1977 | Bruce Compton | Outfielder | Norman High School (Norman, Oklahoma) | 11 | |
| 1978 | Phil Lansford | Shortstop | Wilcox High School (Santa Clara, California) | 10 | |
| 1979 | John Bohnet | Left-handed pitcher | Hogan High School (Vallejo, California) | 7 | |
| 1980 | Kelly Gruber | Shortstop | Westlake High School (Austin, Texas) | 10 | |
| 1981 | George Alpert | Outfielder | Livingston High School (Livingston, New Jersey) | 13 | |
| 1982 | Mark Snyder | Right-handed pitcher | Bearden High School (Knoxville, Tennessee) | 12 | |
| 1983 | Dave Clark | Outfielder | Jackson State University (Jackson, Mississippi) | 11 | |
| 1984 | Cory Snyder | Shortstop | Brigham Young University (Provo, Utah) | 4 | |
| 1985 | Mike Poehl | Right-handed pitcher | University of Texas at Austin (Austin, Texas) | 9 | |
| 1986 | Greg Swindell | Left-handed pitcher | University of Texas at Austin (Austin, Texas) | 2 | |
| 1987 | no first-round pick^{[a]} | | | | |
| 1988 | Mark Lewis | Shortstop | Hamilton High School (Hamilton, Ohio) | 2 | |
| 1988 | Charles Nagy | Right-handed pitcher | University of Connecticut (Storrs, Connecticut) | 17^{[b]} | |
| 1988 | Jeff Mutis | Left-handed pitcher | Lafayette College (Easton, Pennsylvania) | 27§^{[c]} | |
| 1989 | Calvin Murray* | Third baseman | W. T. White High School (Dallas, Texas) | 11 | |
| 1990 | Tim Costo | Shortstop | University of Iowa (Iowa City, Iowa) | 8 | |
| 1990 | Sam Hence | Outfielder | Stone County High School (Wiggins, Mississippi) | 39§^{[d]} | |
| 1991 | Manny Ramirez | Third baseman | George Washington High School (New York, New York) | 13 | |
| 1992 | Paul Shuey | Right-handed pitcher | University of North Carolina at Chapel Hill (Chapel Hill, North Carolina) | 2 | |
| 1993 | Daron Kirkreit | Right-handed pitcher | University of California, Riverside (Riverside, California) | 11 | |
| 1994 | Jaret Wright | Right-handed pitcher | Katella High School (Anaheim, California) | 10 | |
| 1995 | David Miller | First baseman | Clemson University (Clemson, South Carolina) | 23 | |
| 1996 | Danny Peoples | First baseman | University of Texas at Austin (Austin, Texas) | 28 | |
| 1997 | Tim Drew | Right-handed pitcher | Lowndes County High School (Valdosta, Georgia) | 28 | |
| 1997 | Jason Fitzgerald | Outfielder | Tulane University (New Orleans, Louisiana) | 41§^{[e]} | |
| 1998 | CC Sabathia | Left-handed pitcher | Vallejo High School (Vallejo, California) | 20 | |
| 1999 | no first-round pick^{[f]} | | | | |
| 2000 | Corey Smith | Shortstop | Piscataway High School (Piscataway, New Jersey) | 26 | |
| 2000 | Derek Thompson | Left-handed pitcher | Land o' Lakes High School (Land o' Lakes, Florida) | 37§^{[g]} | |
| 2001 | Dan Denham | Right-handed pitcher | Deer Valley High School (Antioch, California) | 17^{[h]} | |
| 2001 | Alan Horne* | Right-handed pitcher | Marianna High School (Marianna, Florida) | 27^{[i]} | |
| 2001 | J. D. Martin | Right-handed pitcher | Burroughs High School (Ridgecrest, California) | 35§^{[j]} | |
| 2001 | Mike Conroy | Outfielder | Boston College High School (Boston, Massachusetts) | 43§^{[k]} | |
| 2002 | Jeremy Guthrie | Right-handed pitcher | Stanford University (Stanford, California) | 22 | |
| 2002 | Matt Whitney | Third baseman | Palm Beach Gardens High School (Palm Beach Gardens, Florida) | 33§^{[l]} | |
| 2002 | Micah Schilling | Second baseman | Silliman Institute (Clinton, Louisiana) | 41§^{[m]} | |
| 2003 | Michael Aubrey | First baseman | Tulane University (New Orleans, Louisiana) | 11 | |
| 2003 | Brad Snyder | Outfielder | Ball State University (Muncie, Indiana) | 18^{[n]} | |
| 2003 | Adam Miller | Right-handed pitcher | McKinney High School (McKinney, Texas) | 31§^{[o]} | |
| 2004 | Jeremy Sowers | Left-handed pitcher | Vanderbilt University (Nashville, Tennessee) | 6 | |
| 2005 | Trevor Crowe | Outfielder | University of Arizona (Tucson, Arizona) | 14 | |
| 2005 | John Drennen | Outfielder | Rancho Bernardo High School (San Diego, California) | 33§^{[p]} | |
| 2006 | David Huff | Left-handed pitcher | University of California, Los Angeles (Los Angeles, California) | 39§^{[q]} | |
| 2007 | Beau Mills | First baseman | Lewis-Clark State College (Lewiston, Idaho) | 13 | |
| 2008 | Lonnie Chisenhall | Third baseman | Pitt Community College (Winterville, North Carolina) | 29 | |
| 2009 | Alex White | Right-handed pitcher | University of North Carolina at Chapel Hill (Chapel Hill, North Carolina) | 15 | |
| 2010 | Drew Pomeranz | Left-handed pitcher | University of Mississippi (Oxford, Mississippi) | 5 | |
| 2011 | Francisco Lindor | Shortstop | Montverde Academy (Montverde, Florida) | 8 | |
| 2012 | Tyler Naquin | Outfielder | Texas A&M University (College Station, Texas) | 15 | |
| 2013 | Clint Frazier | Outfielder | Loganville High School (Loganville, Georgia) | 5 | |
| 2014 | Bradley Zimmer | Outfielder | University of San Francisco (San Francisco, California) | 21 | |
| 2014 | Justus Sheffield | Left-handed pitcher | Tullahoma High School (Tullahoma, Tennessee) | 31 | |
| 2014 | Mike Papi | Outfielder | University of Virginia (Charlottesville, Virginia) | 38 | |
| 2015 | Brady Aiken | Left-handed pitcher | IMG Academy (Bradenton, Florida) | 17 | |
| 2015 | Triston McKenzie | Right-handed pitcher | Royal Palm Beach High School (Royal Palm Beach, Florida) | 42 | |
| 2016 | Will Benson | Outfielder | The Westminster Schools (Atlanta, Georgia) | 14 | |
| 2017 | no first-round pick | | | | |
| 2018 | Bo Naylor | Catcher | St. Joan of Arc Catholic Secondary School (Mississauga, Ontario) | 29 | |
| 2019 | Daniel Espino | Right-handed pitcher | Georgia Premier Academy (Statesboro, Georgia) | 24 | |
| 2020 | Carson Tucker | Shortstop | Mountain Pointe High School (Phoenix, Arizona) | 23 | |
| 2021 | Gavin Williams | Right-handed pitcher | East Carolina University (Greenville, North Carolina) | 23 | |
| 2022 | Chase DeLauter | Outfielder | James Madison University (Harrisonburg, Virginia) | 16 | |
| 2023 | Ralphy Velazquez | Catcher | Huntington Beach High School (Huntington Beach, California) | 23 | |
| 2024 | Travis Bazzana | Second baseman | Oregon State University (Corvallis, Oregon) | 1 | |
| 2025 | Jace LaViolette | Outfielder | Texas A&M University (College Station, Texas) | 27 | |
| 2026 | Liam Peterson | Right-handed pitcher | University of Florida (Gainesville, Florida) | 19 | |

== See also ==
- Cleveland Guardians minor league players

== Footnotes ==
- ^{V} Through the 2012 draft, free agents were evaluated by the Elias Sports Bureau and rated "Type A", "Type B", or not compensation-eligible. If a team offered arbitration to a player but that player refused and subsequently signed with another team, the original team was able to receive additional draft picks. If a "Type A" free agent left in this way, his previous team received a supplemental pick and a compensatory pick from the team with which he signed. If a "Type B" free agent left in this way, his previous team received only a supplemental pick. Since the 2013 draft, free agents are no longer classified by type; instead, compensatory picks are only awarded if the team offered its free agent a contract worth at least the average of the 125 current richest MLB contracts. However, if the free agent's last team acquired the player in a trade during the last year of his contract, it is ineligible to receive compensatory picks for that player.
- ^{a} The Indians lost their first-round pick in 1987 to the Baltimore Orioles as compensation for signing free agent Rick Dempsey.
- ^{b} The Indians gained a compensatory first-round pick in 1988 from the San Francisco Giants for losing free agent Brett Butler.
- ^{c} The Indians gained a supplemental first-round pick in 1988 for losing free agent Brett Butler.
- ^{d} The Indians gained a supplemental first-round pick in 1990 for failing to sign draft pick Calvin Murray.
- ^{e} The Indians gained a supplemental first-round pick in 1997 for losing free agent Albert Belle.
- ^{f} The Indians lost their first-round pick in 1999 to the Baltimore Orioles as compensation for signing free agent Roberto Alomar.
- ^{g} The Indians gained a supplemental first-round pick in 2000 for losing free agent Michael Jackson.
- ^{h} The Indians gained a compensatory first-round pick in 2001 from the Boston Red Sox for losing free agent Manny Ramirez.
- ^{i} The Indians gained a compensatory first-round pick in 2001 from the Chicago White Sox for losing free agent Sandy Alomar Jr.
- ^{j} The Indians gained a supplemental first-round pick in 2001 for losing free agent Manny Ramirez.
- ^{k} The Indians gained a supplemental first-round pick in 2001 for losing free agent David Segui.
- ^{l} The Indians gained a supplemental first-round pick in 2002 for losing free agent Juan González.
- ^{m} The Indians gained a supplemental first-round pick in 2002 for failing to sign draft pick Alan Horne.
- ^{n} The Indians gained a compensatory first-round pick in 2003 from the Philadelphia Phillies for losing free agent Jim Thome.
- ^{o} The Indians gained a supplemental first-round pick in 2003 for losing free agent Jim Thome.
- ^{p} The Indians gained a supplemental first-round pick in 2005 for losing free agent Omar Vizquel.
- ^{q} The Indians gained a supplemental first-round pick in 2006 for losing free agent Bob Howry.
