= 2003 Major League Baseball draft =

Major League Baseball's 2003 annual amateur draft

General information
- Date: June 3–4, 2003

Overview
- First selection: Delmon Young; Tampa Bay Devil Rays

The 2003 Major League Baseball draft, was held on June 3 and 4. It was conducted via conference call with representatives from each of the league's 30 teams.

Source: MLB.com 2003 Draft Tracker

== First round selections ==
All-Star
Player did not sign

Pick	Player	Team	Position	School
1	Delmon Young	Tampa Bay Devil Rays	OF	Camarillo High School (CA)
2	Rickie Weeks	Milwaukee Brewers	2B	Southern
3	Kyle Sleeth	Detroit Tigers	RHP	Wake Forest
4	Tim Stauffer	San Diego Padres	RHP	Richmond
5	Chris Lubanski	Kansas City Royals	CF	Kennedy-Kenrick Catholic High School (PA)
6	Ryan Harvey	Chicago Cubs	CF	Dunedin High School (FL)
7	Nick Markakis	Baltimore Orioles	OF	Young Harris College
8	Paul Maholm	Pittsburgh Pirates	LHP	Mississippi State
9	John Danks	Texas Rangers	LHP	Round Rock High School (TX)
10	Ian Stewart	Colorado Rockies	3B	La Quinta High School (CA)
11	Michael Aubrey	Cleveland Indians	1B	Tulane
12	Lastings Milledge	New York Mets	OF	Lakewood Ranch High School (FL)
13	Aaron Hill	Toronto Blue Jays	SS	LSU
14	Ryan Wagner	Cincinnati Reds	RHP	Houston
15	Brian Anderson	Chicago White Sox	CF	Arizona
16	Jeff Allison	Florida Marlins	RHP	Peabody Veterans Memorial High School (MA)
17	David Murphy	Boston Red Sox	CF	Baylor
18	Brad Snyder	Cleveland Indians (Note: Compensation pick from Philadelphia Phillies for signing free agent Jim Thome)	RF	Ball State
19	Conor Jackson	Arizona Diamondbacks (Note: Compensation pick from Seattle Mariners for signing free agent Greg Colbrunn)	3B	California
20	Chad Cordero	Montreal Expos	RHP	Cal State Fullerton
21	Matt Moses	Minnesota Twins	3B	Godwin High School (VA)
22	David Aardsma	San Francisco Giants (Note: Compensation pick from Houston Astros for signing free agent Jeff Kent)	RHP	Rice
23	Brandon Wood	Anaheim Angels	SS	Horizon High School (TX)
24	Chad Billingsley	Los Angeles Dodgers	RHP	Defiance High School (OH)
25	Brad Sullivan	Oakland Athletics	RHP	Houston
26	Brian Snyder	Oakland Athletics (Note: Compensation pick from San Francisco Giants for signing free agent Ray Durham)	3B	Stetson
27	Eric Duncan	New York Yankees	3B	Seton Hall Preparatory School (NJ)
28	Daric Barton	St. Louis Cardinals	C	Marina High School (CA)
29	Carlos Quentin	Arizona Diamondbacks	OF	Stanford
30	Mitch Maier	Kansas City Royals (Note: Compensation pick from Atlanta Braves for signing free agent Paul Byrd)	C	Toledo

== Supplemental first round selections ==
Pick	Player	Team	Position	School
31	Adam Miller	Cleveland Indians (Note: Supplemental pick for loss of free agent Jim Thome)	RHP	McKinney High School (TX)
32	Matt Murton	Boston Red Sox (Note: Supplemental pick for loss of free agent Cliff Floyd)	OF	Georgia Tech
33	Omar Quintanilla	Oakland Athletics (Note: Supplemental pick for loss of free agent Ray Durham)	SS	Texas
34	Craig Whitaker	San Francisco Giants (Note: Supplemental pick for loss of free agent Jeff Kent)	RHP	Lufkin High School (TX)
35	Luis Atilano	Atlanta Braves (Note: Supplemental pick for loss of free agent Tom Glavine)	C	Gabriela Mistral High School (PR)
36	Jarrod Saltalamacchia	Atlanta Braves (Note: Supplemental pick for loss of free agent Mike Remlinger)	C	Royal Palm Beach High School (FL)
37	Adam Jones	Seattle Mariners (Note: Supplemental pick for failure to sign 2002 No.1 choice John Mayberry Jr.)	SS/P	Morse High School (CA)

== Other notable players ==
- Tony Gwynn Jr., 2nd round, 39th overall by the Milwaukee Brewers
- Tom Gorzelanny, 2nd round, 45th overall by the Pittsburgh Pirates
- Ryan Sweeney, 2nd round, 52nd overall by the Chicago White Sox
- Scott Baker, 2nd round, 58th overall by the Minnesota Twins
- Andre Ethier, 2nd round, 62nd overall by the Oakland Athletics
- Chris Ray, 3rd round, 74th overall by the Baltimore Orioles
- Shaun Marcum, 3rd round, 80th overall by the Toronto Blue Jays
- Drew Stubbs, 3rd round, 89th overall by the Houston Astros, but did not sign
- Matt Harrison, 3rd round, 97th overall by the Atlanta Braves
- Jonathan Papelbon, 4th round, 114th overall by the Boston Red Sox
- Michael Bourn, 4th round, 115th overall by the Philadelphia Phillies
- Sean Marshall, 6th round, 163rd overall by the Chicago Cubs
- Kevin Kouzmanoff, 6th round, 168th overall by the Cleveland Indians
- Eric O'Flaherty, 6th round, 176th overall by the Seattle Mariners
- Matt Kemp, 6th round, 181st overall by the Los Angeles Dodgers
- Mike Avilés, 7th round, 192nd overall by the Kansas City Royals
- Brian Bannister, 7th round, 199th overall by the New York Mets
- Kyle Kendrick, 7th round, 205th overall by the Philadelphia Phillies
- Brendan Ryan, 7th round, 215th overall by the St. Louis Cardinals
- Tyler Clippard, 9th round, 274th overall by the New York Yankees
- Casey McGehee, 10th round, 283rd overall by the Chicago Cubs
- John Jaso, 12th round, 338th overall by the Tampa Bay Devil Rays
- Matt LaPorta, 14th round, 403rd overall by the Chicago Cubs, but did not sign
- Mike Dunn, 14th round, 419th overall by the Houston Astros, but did not sign
- Ian Kennedy, 14th round, 425th overall by the St. Louis Cardinals, but did not sign
- Aaron Laffey, 16th round, 468th overall by the Cleveland Indians
- Ian Kinsler, 17th round, 496th overall by the Texas Rangers
- Ryan Roberts, 18th round, 530th overall by the Toronto Blue Jays
- Chris Coghlan, 18th round, 546th overall by the Arizona Diamondbacks, but did not sign
- Jason Motte, 19th round, 575th overall by the St. Louis Cardinals
- Brad Ziegler, 20th round, 595th overall by the Philadelphia Phillies
- Daniel Bard, 20th round, 604th overall by the New York Yankees, but did not sign
- Tony Watson, 23rd round, 683rd overall by the Florida Marlins, but did not sign
- Sam Fuld, 24th round, 703rd overall by the Chicago Cubs, but did not sign
- Brian Wilson, 24th round, 723rd overall by the San Francisco Giants
- Brad Lincoln, 28th round, 826th overall by the Texas Rangers, but did not sign
- David Hernandez, 29th round, 857th overall by the Colorado Rockies, but did not sign
- Scott Feldman, 30th round, 886th overall by the Texas Rangers
- Jonny Venters, 30th round, 907th overall by the Atlanta Braves
- Wade LeBlanc, 36th round, 1058th overall by the Tampa Bay Devil Rays, but did not sign
- Logan Ondrusek, 36th round, 1079th overall by the Houston Astros, but did not sign
- Kris Medlen, 37th round, 1088th overall by the Tampa Bay Devil Rays, but did not sign
- Jesse Litsch, 37th round, 1097th overall by the Colorado Rockies, but did not sign
- Andy LaRoche, 39th round, 1171st overall by the Los Angeles Dodgers
- Brandon Morrow, 40th round, 1200th overall by the Anaheim Angels, but did not sign
- Jim Adduci, 42nd round, 1252nd overall by the Florida Marlins
- Max Scherzer, 43rd round, 1291st overall by the St. Louis Cardinals, but did not sign
- Steve Pearce, 45th round, 1341st overall by the Minnesota Twins, but did not sign
- Tim Lincecum, 48th round, 1408th overall by the Chicago Cubs, but did not sign
- Casey Janssen, 49th round, 1435th overall by the Baltimore Orioles, but did not sign
- Doug Fister, 49th round, 1451st overall by the San Francisco Giants, but did not sign

== NFL players drafted ==
- Chaz Schilens, 34th round, 1000th overall by the Detroit Tigers, but did not sign

== Background ==
The Tampa Bay Devil Rays selected Camarillo High School outfielder Delmon Young with the first overall pick.

Young (6-3, 205 pounds) batted .541 (33-for-61) with seven home runs, 28 RBI in 22 games as a senior this spring for Camarillo. He was named Baseball America's High School Player of the Year in 2002 and was one of only three juniors selected as first team 2002 All-Americans. He became the first junior to be named California State Player of the Year since Eric Chavez in 1995.

At the World Junior Championships in Sherbrooke, Quebec, he helped lead Team USA to a bronze medal while batting .513 with a tournament-record eight home runs and 19 RBI in 38 at-bats.

Young is the younger brother of retired MLB player Dmitri Young, who was an expansion draft pick of the Rays, but never played in the organization. They became the first set of brothers to be taken within the first five selections of the draft. Dmitri was the 4th player selected by the Cardinals in the 1991 draft.

Pitchers Ryan Wagner (Cincinnati), Chad Cordero (Montreal), David Aardsma (San Francisco) and infielder Rickie Weeks (Milwaukee) all reached the Major League level in less than a year.

Chad Cordero was the first 2003 draftee to be selected to an All-Star Game, selected in 2005. Abe Alvarez, drafted in the 2nd round, was the first 2003 draftee to win a World Series championship, although he was not on the 2004 Boston Red Sox postseason roster. Anthony Reyes, drafted in the 15th round, was the first to be on a winning World Series roster.

The Atlanta Braves selected Rick Sporcic SS Highlands HS (PA) Round 50 Draft #1480 with the final pick of the 2003 MLB Draft. 2× Cy Young Award winner Tim Lincecum was drafted by the Chicago Cubs in the forty-eighth round (1,408 pick)

Preceded by Bryan Bullington	1st Overall Picks; Delmon Young	Succeeded by Matt Bush
