= Serenity =

Serenity may refer to:

== Arts and entertainment ==
=== Firefly franchise ===
- "Serenity" (Firefly episode), the 2002 pilot TV episode
- Serenity (Firefly vessel), the fictional spaceship
- Serenity (2005 film), a sequel to the Firefly television series
  - Serenity (soundtrack)
- Serenity Role Playing Game, released in 2005
- Serenity (comics), published from 2005 to 2017
- Serenity: Those Left Behind, a 2005 three-issue comic book limited series
- Serenity: Better Days, a 2008 three-issue comic book miniseries
- Serenity: Leaves on the Wind, a 2014 six-issue comic book miniseries

=== Fictional characters ===
- Sailor Moon (character), also known as Princess Serenity and Neo-Queen Serenity, in the Sailor Moon media franchise
- Queen Serenity, in the Sailor Moon media franchise
- Serenity Johnson, in the TV series Halfway Home

=== Other arts and entertainment ===
- Serenity (2019 film), a thriller starring Matthew McConaughey, Anne Hathaway and Diane Lane
- Serenity (Clara), a public artwork by Josep Clarà, in Washington, D.C., United States

== Music ==
- Serenity (band), an Austrian metal band founded in 2001
- Serenity (Kotipelto album), 2007
- Serenity (Blood for Blood album), 2004
- Serenity (Bobo Stenson album), 2000
- Serenity (Culture Beat album), 1993
- Serenity (Prosumer and Murat Tepeli album), 2008
- Serenity (Stan Getz album), 1989
- Serenity (EP), 2020 debut EP by Sena Kana
- "Serenity" (song), a song by Godsmack
- "Serenity", a song from Stronger Than Before by Olivia Newton-John
- "Serenity", a song from The Healing of Harms by Fireflight
- "Serenity", a song from Shivers by Armin van Buuren
- "Serenity", a song from Chimera by Delerium
- "Serenity", a song from Around the Sun by Jeff Watson

== Other uses ==
- Sea of Serenity, translation of Mare Serenitatis, a lunar mare
- Serenity Chasma, a major fault system on Pluto's moon Charon
- Serenity (Clara), a sculpture in Washington, D.C.
- Serenity McKay (1997–2017), Indigenous Canadian murder victim
- Serenity (actress), American pornographic actress Sonya Elizabeth Lane (born 1969)
- Serenity (given name)
- Serenity High School, a substance-abuse recovery high school in McKinney, Texas, U.S.
- Serenity (style), a form of address for royalty or nobility
- SerenityOS, a free and open-source desktop operating system
- A planned future version of Ethereum

== See also ==
- Serenity Prayer, a prayer by Reinhold Niebuhr
- Passaddhi (English: Serenity), a Pali-language Buddhist term
- Serene (disambiguation)
