= Seren =

Seren may refer to:

- Seren (name)
- Seren Books, a Welsh publishing house
- Seren Network, a Welsh educational organisation to assist high-achieving sixth form students
- Seren, a lord of the Biblical Philistines
- Seren, an Israel Defense Forces rank equivalent to an army captain
- Seren, a student newspaper published by Bangor University Students' Union

== See also ==
- Seren taun, an annual traditional Sundanese rice harvest festival and ceremony
- Serene (disambiguation)
