= McKinney Boyd High School =

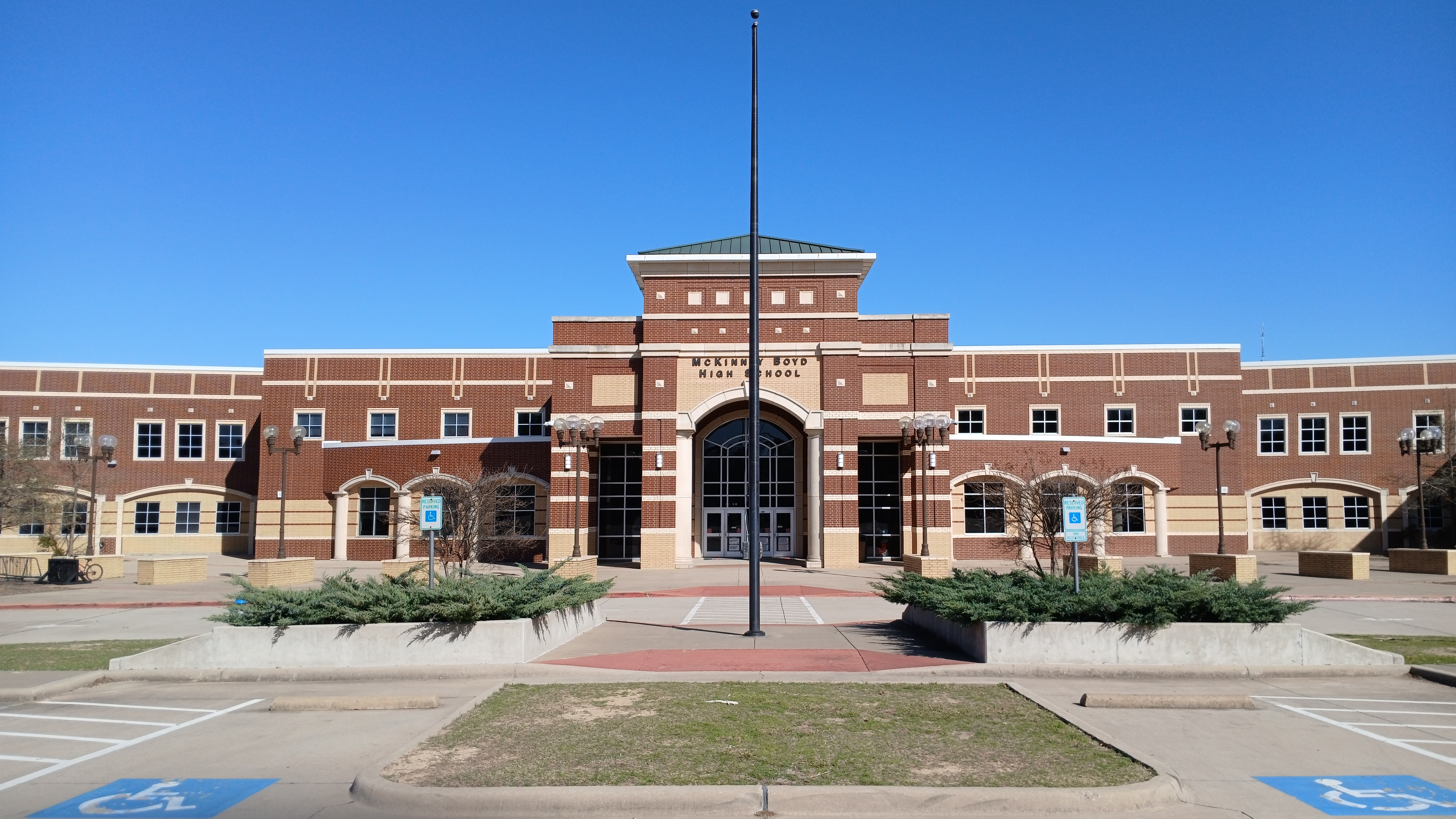
- McKinney Boyd High School

Location
- 600 Lake Forest Drive; McKinney, Texas; United States; 33.2029°N 96.67847°W

Information
- Type: Public High School
- Established: 2006
- School district: McKinney Independent School District
- Principal: Dr. David Hodum
- Teaching staff: 160.29 (FTE)
- Grades: 9–12
- Enrollment: 2,547 (2024–2025)
- Student to teacher ratio: 15.89
- Campus type: Suburban
- Colors: Scarlet & Navy
- Athletics conference: UIL Class 6A
- Mascot: Bronco
- Website: McKinney Boyd High School

McKinney Boyd High School (commonly Boyd, Boyd High School, McKinney Boyd, or MBHS) is a public secondary school located on North Lake Forest Drive in McKinney, Texas, United States, that serves ninth, tenth, eleventh, and twelfth grade students. The class of 2008 was the school's first graduating class. The school is part of the McKinney Independent School District.

== History and forward plans ==
This is the third high school in McKinney, the others being McKinney High School and McKinney North High School. Setting McKinney Boyd up proved controversial, with many students being compulsorily transferred from the other schools. Further, bussing long distances to achieve socio-economic diversity is being continued.

Opened in August 2006, McKinney Boyd is named after Mary Crane Boyd who endowed an earlier school in 1914. Starting in fall 2007, Boyd began to enroll 12th Graders, and the school's current total enrollment is approximately 3,000 students. Beginning the 2008–2009 school year, McKinney Boyd High School started to compete in the 5A classification.

Boyd High School completed all construction of its school building with the completion of the third phase over the summer of 2007. Although the city of McKinney has been focusing on finishing its re-modeling of Highway 75, there have been three community meetings, since April 2011, regarding further construction. The city has been planning a separate building for McKinney Boyd, with its own indoor swimming pool for school use with its swim team, and to use the remaining land for a small golf course for its golf team. The building was not to have any classrooms, but be used for practice for its sports teams, such as the swim and golf team. As of June 2011 no other meeting had been planned, and the plan had been put on hold until the completion of the re-modeling of Highway 75 with the intention of fully re-opening its roads by March 2012.

Boyd High School opened in September 2006 at costs exceeding $88 million. Boyd's capacity is 3,000.

== Extracurricular activities ==
Boyd allows most of its clubs to be started by some students, so long as each club has a sponsor and constitution.

=== Athletics ===
The McKinney Boyd Broncos compete in the following sports: Baseball, Basketball, Bowling, Cross Country, Football, Golf, Powerlifting, Soccer, Softball, Swimming and Diving, Tennis, Track and Field, Volleyball, and Wrestling.

=== Band ===
The McKinney Boyd High School Band 2006 show was titled Bohemia!, based on Queen's Bohemian Rhapsody and was arranged by Dwayne Rice. The Boyd Band finished in sixth place in the preliminary round at the Denton Golden Triangle Classic. In the final round, they advanced to fourth place, ranking ahead of many larger bands.

They also competed at the UIL Region 3-4A Marching Band competition on October 25, 2006, and received Sweepstakes Ratings, the highest rating awarded in marching band competition. The rating signifies a First Division Rating from all three judges at the competition.

The band's 2022–23 program was entitled 'Beacon of Hope,' and was arranged by Robert Selaiden and Andrew Hoskins with selections including Chasing Sunlight” by Nishimura, “Wine Dark Sea” by Mackey, “Candle on the Water” from Pete’s Dragon, “Building a Family” from Life as a House, and “Home” from The Wiz. The band made history as it was the first time that the band had made it to the state level and the first time a band from MISD went to state at the 6A division. The band made 27th out of 42 bands in the preliminary round at the UIL 6A state competition.

== Notable alumni ==
- Hollie Cavanagh (class of 2011), an American singer who placed 4th on the 11th season of American Idol
- Conor Doyle (class of 2009), USL soccer player
- Jeff Fuller (class of 2008), NFL and CFL wide receiver, played college football at Texas A&M
- Ross Matiscik (class of 2015), NFL player for the Jacksonville Jaguars
- Tyrese Robinson (Class of 2017), NFL player for the New England Patriots
