= McKinney Independent School District =

School district in Texas, United States

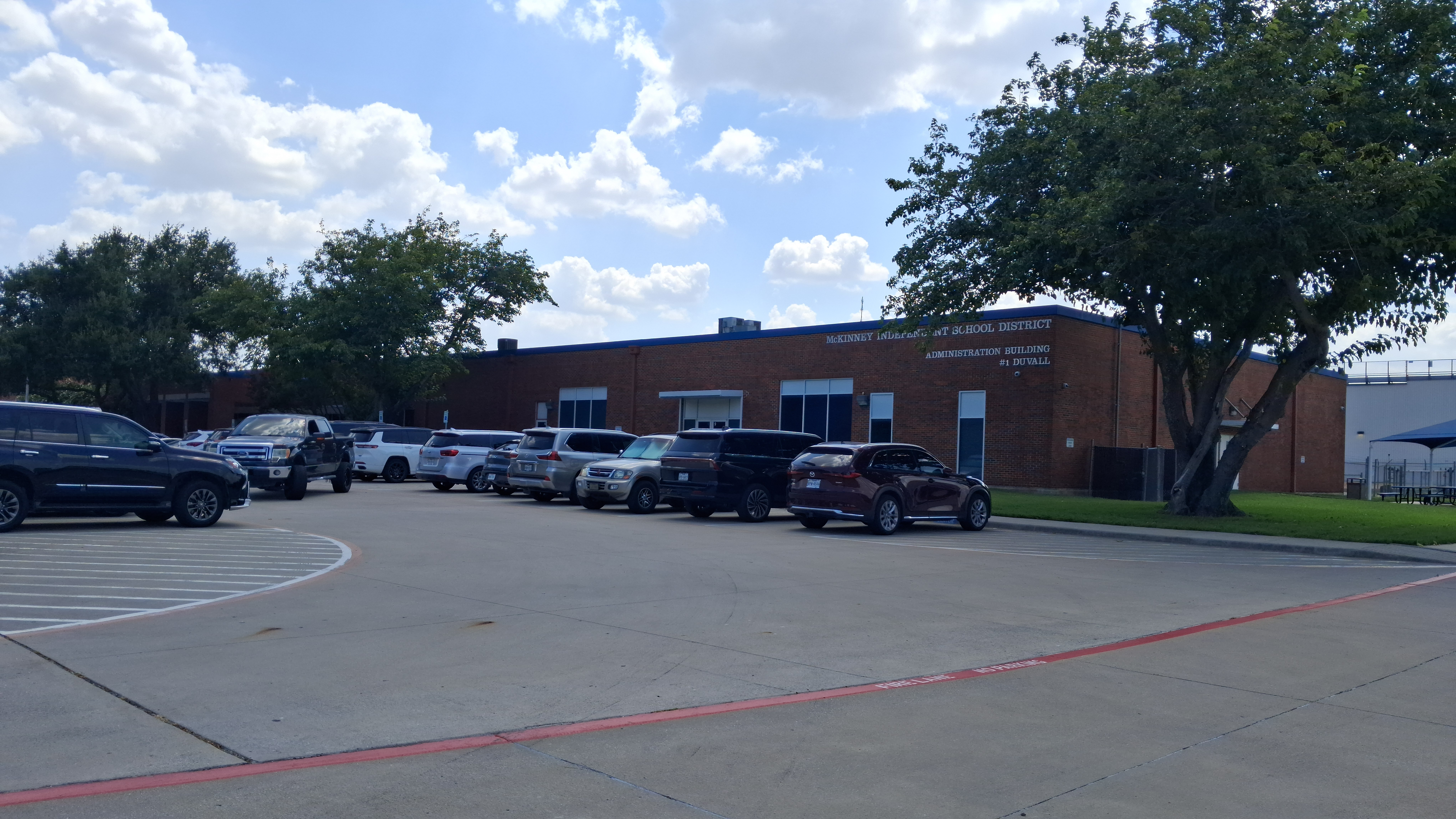

Address
- One Duvall Street McKinney, Collin County, Texas; United States

District information
- Type: Public School
- Motto: Every Student, Every Day!
- Grades: Pre-K – 12th grade
- Established: 1848
- Superintendent: Shawn Pratt
- Schools: 32
- NCES District ID: 4829850

Students and staff
- Students: 23,306 (2023-2024)
- Teachers: 1,583.03 (FTE)
- Student–teacher ratio: 14.72

Other information
- Website: https://www.mckinneyisd.net/

McKinney Independent School District (McKinney ISD) is a public independent school district in McKinney, Texas, United States. In addition to McKinney, the district serves the town of New Hope and parts of Allen, Fairview, Weston, Princeton, and Lowry Crossing. The district operates 18 elementary schools, five middle schools, three high schools, two alternative schools, and one early childhood education center.

In 2009, the school district was rated "academically acceptable" by the Texas Education Agency.

== History ==
Circa 2014 residents of the Stonegate neighborhood in Lucas made a petition to be rezoned from McKinney ISD into Lovejoy ISD, but both districts refused the request.

== Demographics ==
McKinney ISD Ethnicity Data 2025–2026
Ethnicity	Percent
White	38.4%
Asian	9.4%
Hispanic	28.4%
African American	17.4%
American Indian	0.3%
Pacific Islander	0.1%
Two or More Races	6%

== Schools ==
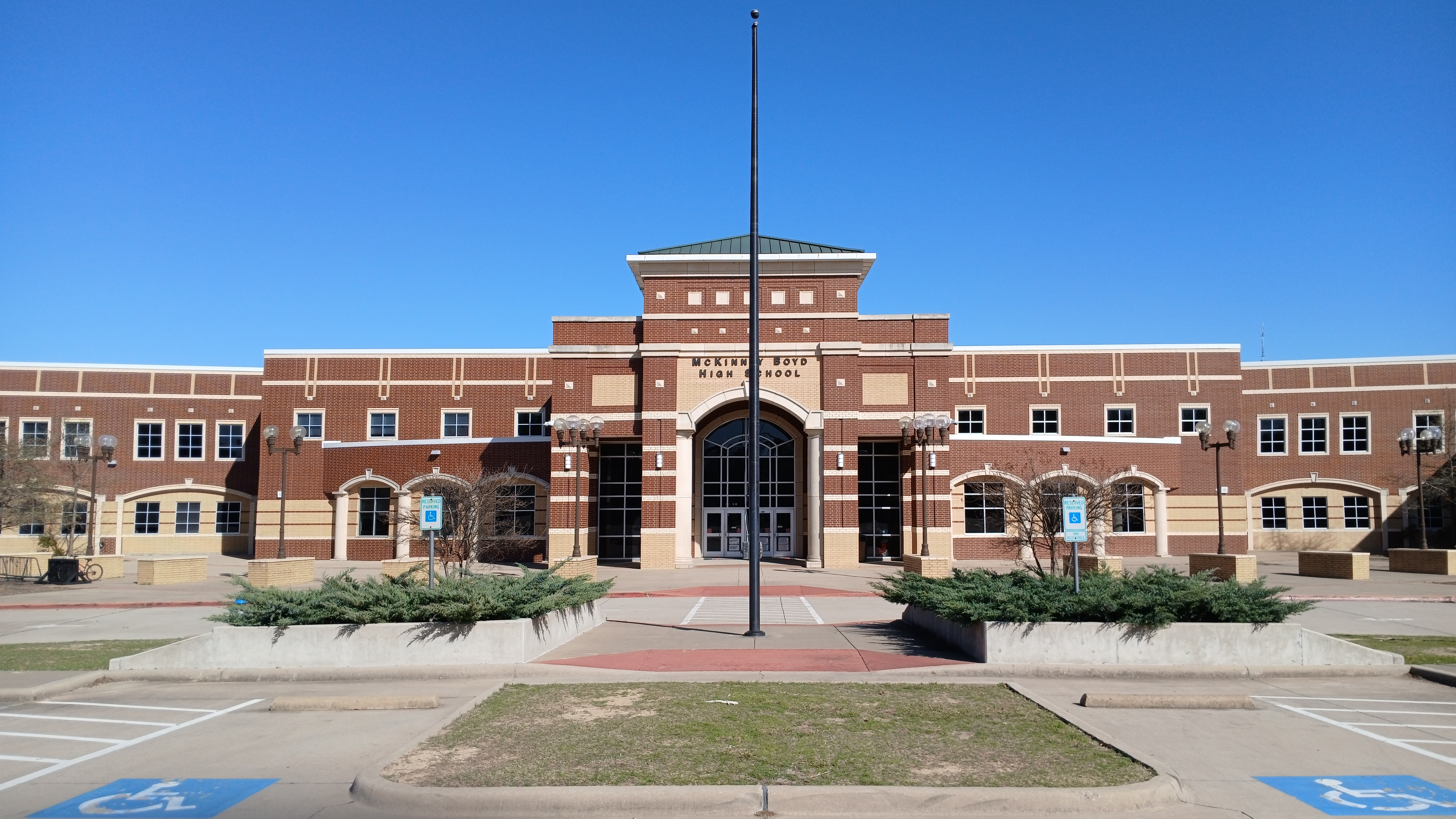
McKinney Boyd High School

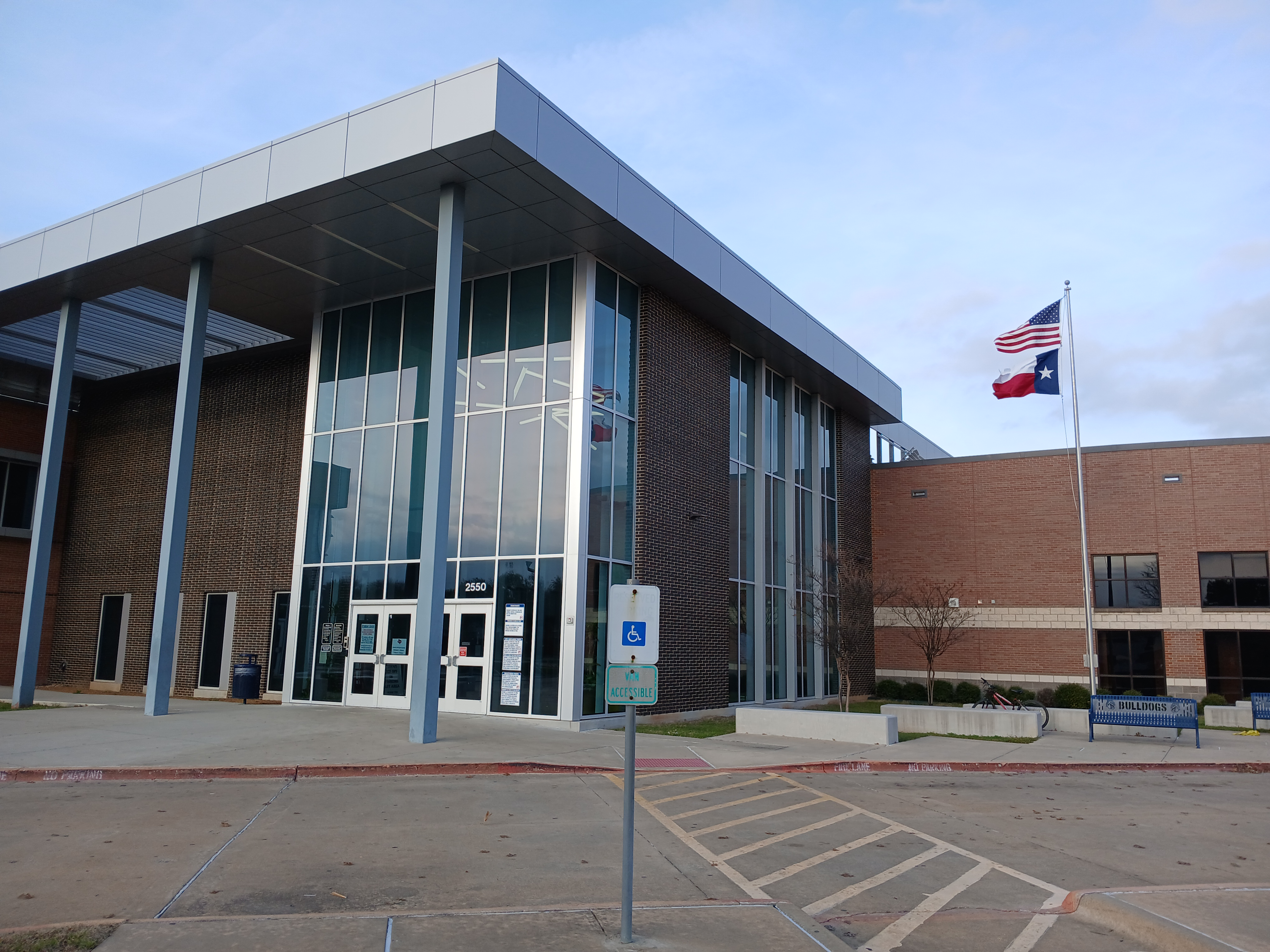
McKinney North High School

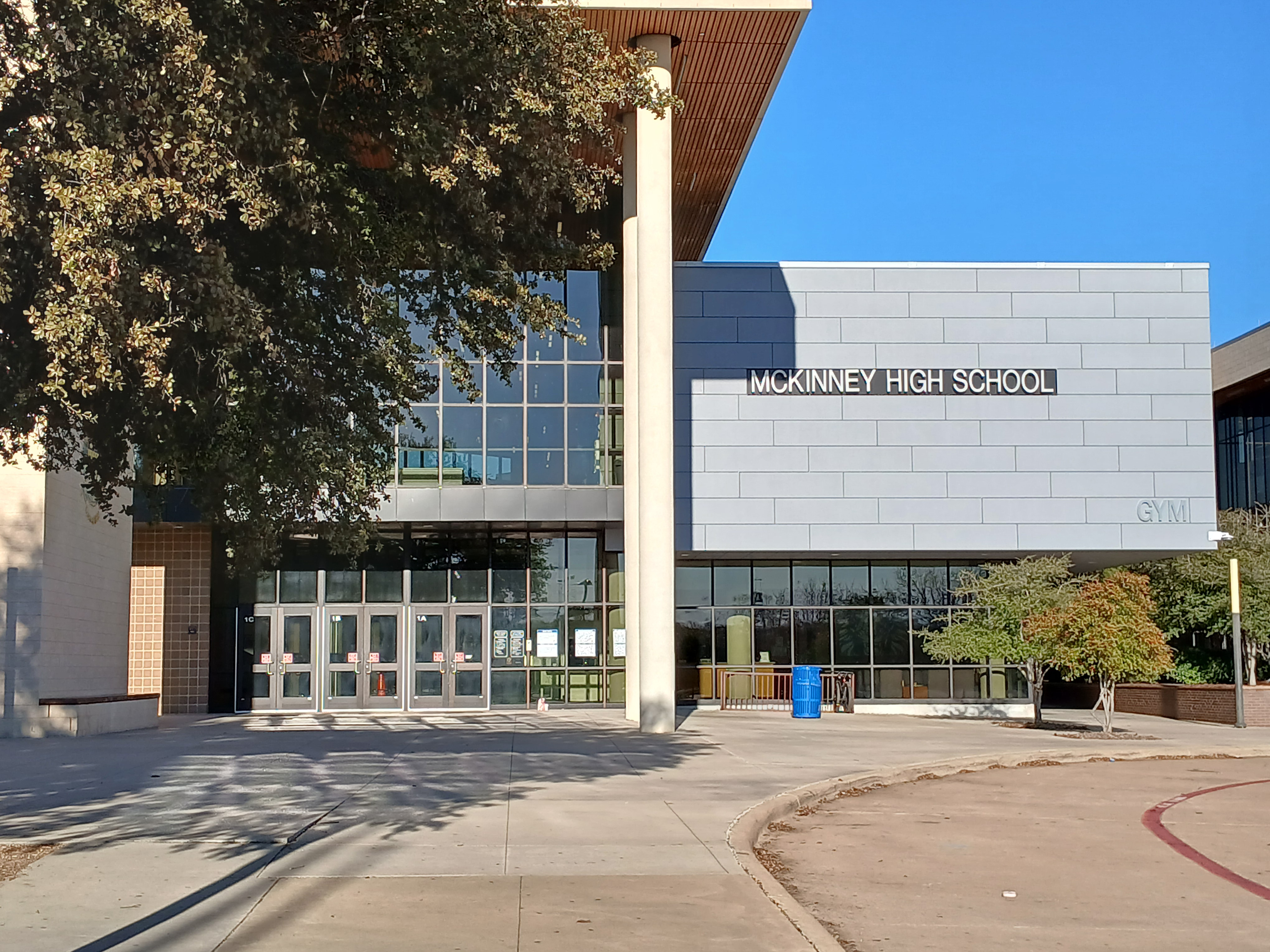
McKinney High School

High schools (grades 9-12)
Name	Mascot	Established	Additional information
McKinney Boyd High School	Broncos	2006	
McKinney High School	Lions	1848	
McKinney North High School	Bulldogs	2000	

Middle schools (grades 6-8)
Name	Mascot	Established	Additional information
Cockrill Middle School	Cowboys	2008	
Dowell Middle School	Lions	1995	
Evans Middle School	Panthers	2004	
Faubion Middle School	Lions	1960	
Johnson Middle School	Tigers	2002	

Elementary schools (grades PK-5)
Name	Established	Additional information
Bennett Elementary	2002	
Burks Elementary	1953	Formerly West Ward Elementary
Caldwell Dual Language Academy	1961	
Finch Elementary	1924	Formerly South Ward Elementary; Current campus built in 1939
Frazier Elementary	2023	
Glen Oaks Elementary	1993	2007 National Blue Ribbon School
Johnson Elementary	1997	
Malvern Elementary	2002	
McClure Elementary	2010	
McGowen Elementary	2007	
Minshew Elementary	2004	
Press Elementary	2004	
Slaughter Elementary	1995 or 2003	Opened as Slaughter Junior High in 1974
Valley Creek Elementary	1991	National Blue Ribbon School in 1996-97 and 2003-24
Vega Elementary	2006	
Walker Elementary	2000	
Webb Elementary	1953	Formerly East Ward Elementary
Wilmeth Elementary	2005	

Other schools
Name	Established	Additional information
McKinney Learning Center		
McNeil Elementary	2001	
Serenity High School (Grades 9–12)	1999	Housed at MNHS.
Herman Lawson Early Childhood Center		

Former schools
Name	Established	Closed	Additional information
Eddins Elementary	1998	2026	2007 National Blue Ribbon School. Decline enrollment.
Greer Elementary	1912	2005	Opened as North Ward Elementary; a new campus was built in 1936
McNeil Elementary	2001	2026	Decline enrollment.
Wolford Elementary	2000	2026	2006 National Blue Ribbon School. Decline enrollment.

== Stadium ==
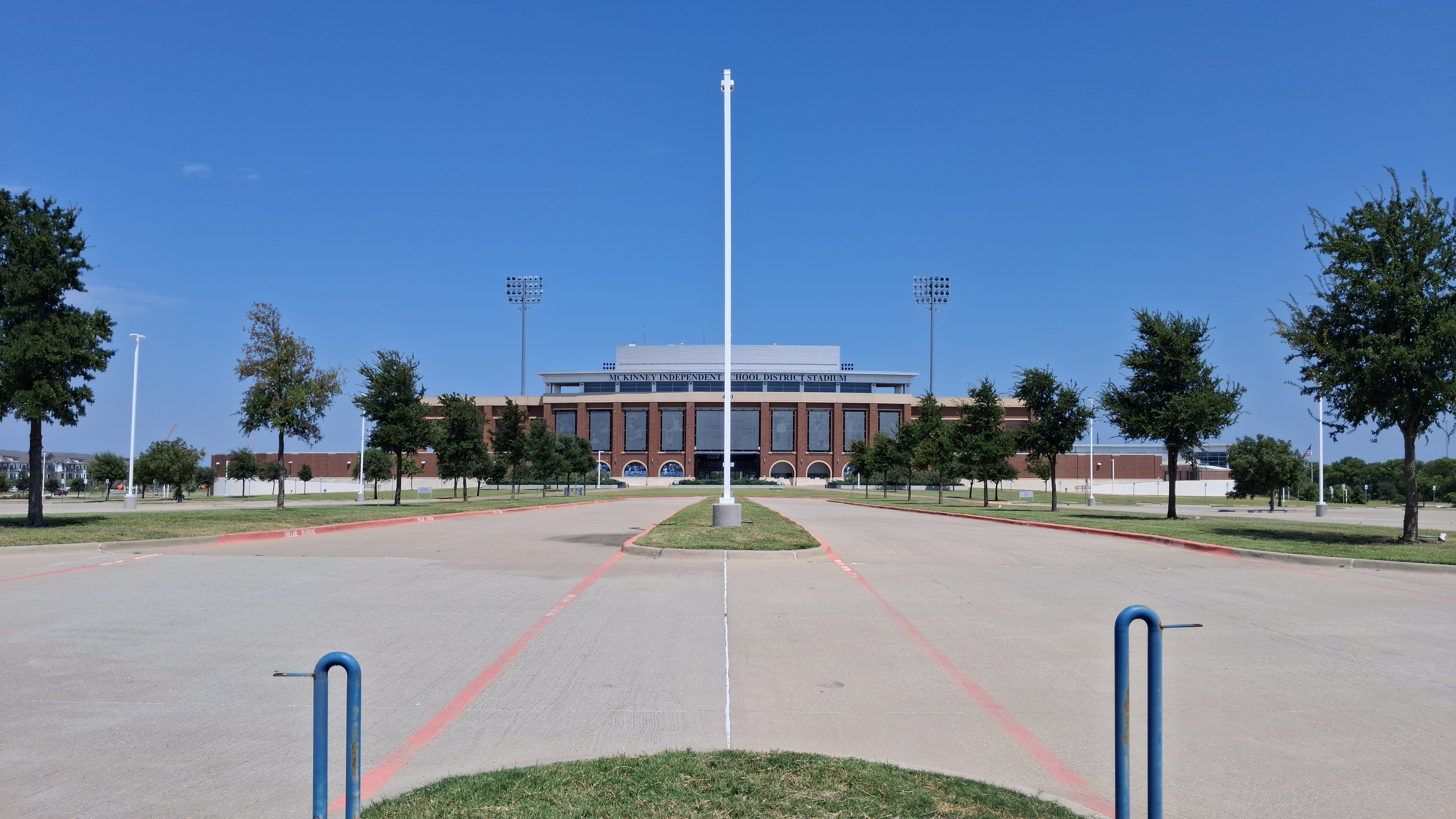
Front view Stadium entring

The district operates the 12,000-seat McKinney ISD Stadium that cost more than $70 million to build. It opened on August 31, 2018. The stadium hosted the 2018, 2019, 2021, 2022, 2023, 2024, and 2025 NCAA Division II National Championship football games as well as several UIL state football playoff games, such as Duncanville vs. Rockwall in 2019.
