= Tyrese Robinson =

American football player (born 1999)

Profile
- Position: Guard

Personal information
- Born: August 21, 1999 (age 27); McKinney, Texas, U.S.
- Listed height: 6 ft 3 in (1.91 m)
- Listed weight: 319 lb (145 kg)

Career information
- High school: McKinney Boyd
- College: Oklahoma (2017–2021)
- NFL draft: 2022: undrafted

Career history
- Washington Commanders (2022)*; Philadelphia Eagles (2022–2023)*; Minnesota Vikings (2024)*; New England Patriots (2024); Birmingham Stallions (2026)
- * Offseason or practice squad member only

Awards and highlights
- Second-team All-Big 12 (2021)

Career NFL statistics as of 2024
- Games played: 1
- Stats at Pro Football Reference

Tyrese Robinson (born August 21, 1999) is an American professional football guard. He played college football for the Oklahoma Sooners.

== Early life ==
Robinson grew up in McKinney, Texas and attended McKinney Boyd High School. He was a four-star rated recruit and committed to play college football at the University of Oklahoma over offers from Auburn, Michigan and Texas.

== College career ==
Robinson was redshirted during his true freshman season in 2017. During the 2018 season, he played in five games. During the 2019 season, he played in and started all 14 games (12 at right guard). During the 2020 season, he played in and started all 11 games at right guard, finishing the season with allowing just two sacks on 400 pass plays. During the 2021 season, he played in and started all 13 games at right tackle. He was named a second-team All-Big 12 selection.

On December 31, 2021, Robinson declared for the 2022 NFL draft.

== Professional career ==
Pre-draft measurables
Height	Weight	Arm length	Hand span	Wingspan	40-yard dash	10-yard split	20-yard split	20-yard shuttle	Three-cone drill	Vertical jump	Broad jump
6 ft 2 7/8 in (1.90 m)	317 lb (144 kg)	33 3/4 in (0.86 m)	10 1/4 in (0.26 m)	6 ft 6 3/4 in (2.00 m)	5.16 s	1.88 s	2.95 s	4.94 s	8.15 s	22.5 in (0.57 m)	8 ft 4 in (2.54 m)
All values from NFL Combine/Pro Day

=== Washington Commanders ===
Robinson signed with the Washington Commanders as an undrafted free agent on May 2, 2022, but was released on August 7, 2022.

=== Philadelphia Eagles ===
On October 3, 2022, Robinson was signed to the Philadelphia Eagles practice squad. He was released on November 25, but was signed back to the practice squad on November 30. On February 16, 2023, Robinson was signed to a reserve/future contract. He was released on August 26.

=== Minnesota Vikings ===
On January 8, 2024, Robinson was signed to a reserve/future contract with the Minnesota Vikings. He was waived on August 27, 2024, but was signed to the practice squad the next day.

=== New England Patriots ===
On November 6, 2024, Robinson was signed to the New England Patriots' 53-man roster.

On August 22, 2025, Robinson was released by the Patriots.

=== Birmingham Stallions ===
On January 14, 2026, Robinson was selected by the Birmingham Stallions of the United Football League (UFL). He was released on May 20.
