= Jimmy Moreland =

American football player (born 1995)

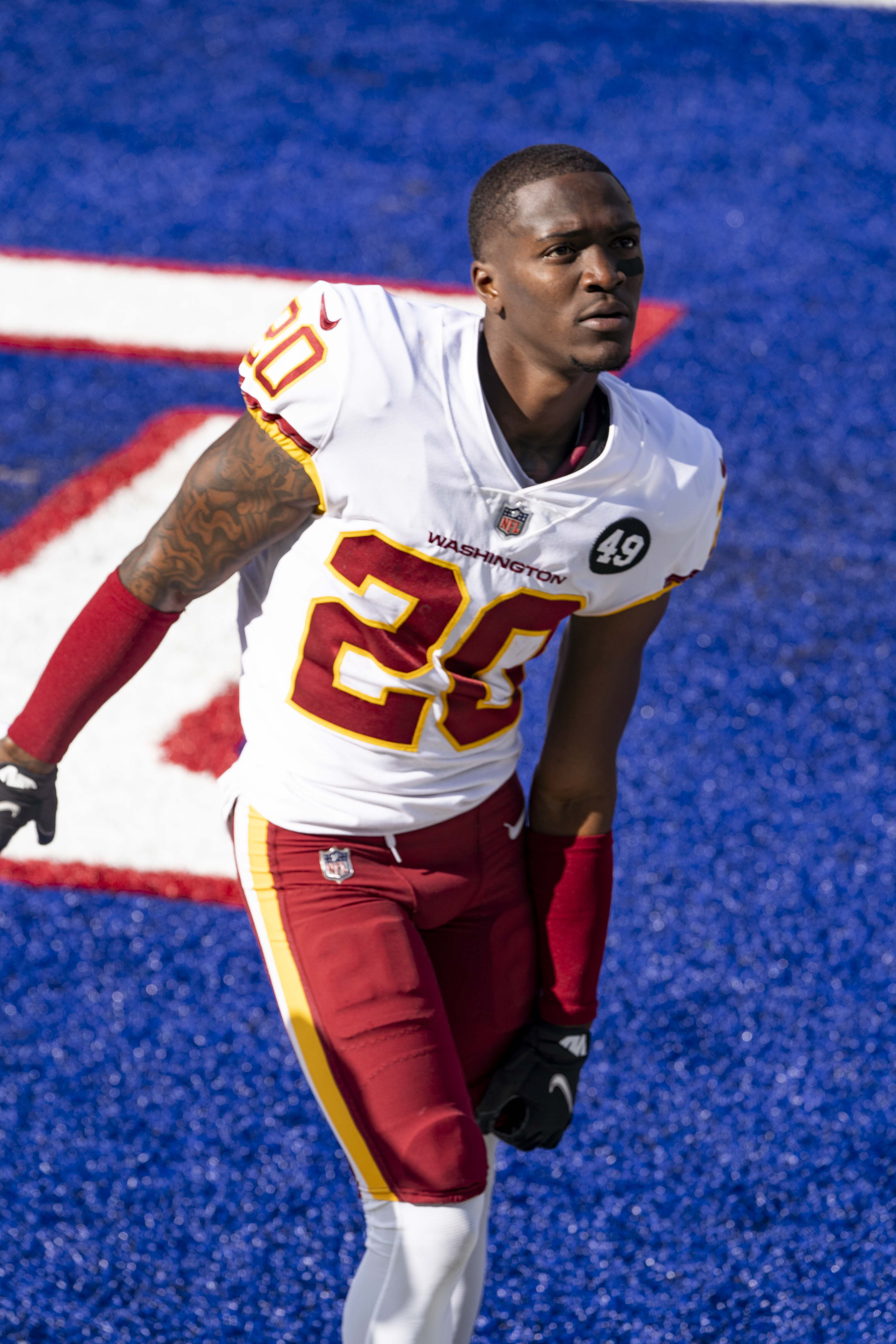
- Moreland with the Washington Football Team in 2020

Profile
- Position: Cornerback

Personal information
- Born: August 26, 1995 (age 31); Belle Glade, Florida, U.S.
- Listed height: 5 ft 11 in (1.80 m)
- Listed weight: 182 lb (83 kg)

Career information
- High school: Royal Palm Beach (Royal Palm Beach, Florida)
- College: James Madison (2014–2018)
- NFL draft: 2019: 7th round, 227th overall pick

Career history
- Washington Redskins / Football Team (2019–2020); Houston Texans (2021); Philadelphia Eagles (2022)*; New York Jets (2022–2023)*; Houston Roughnecks (2024)
- * Offseason or practice squad member only

Awards and highlights
- FCS national champion (2016)

Career NFL statistics
- Total tackles: 88
- Sacks: 0.5
- Forced fumbles: 1
- Interceptions: 1
- Pass deflections: 5
- Stats at Pro Football Reference

Jimmy Roger Moreland Jr. (born August 26, 1995) is an American professional football cornerback. He played college football at James Madison and was selected by the Washington Redskins in the seventh round of the 2019 NFL draft.

== Early life ==
Moreland was born in Belle Glade, Florida, and attended Royal Palm Beach High School.

== College career ==
Moreland played college football at James Madison University, starting at cornerback for their football team from 2014 until 2018. Known there as a "ball hawk", he accounted for 18 total interceptions, returning five of them for touchdowns, both school records.

== Professional career ==
Pre-draft measurables
Height	Weight	Arm length	Hand span	40-yard dash	10-yard split	20-yard split	20-yard shuttle	Three-cone drill	Vertical jump	Broad jump	Bench press
5 ft 9 3/4 in (1.77 m)	179 lb (81 kg)	29 5/8 in (0.75 m)	9 in (0.23 m)	4.46 s	1.56 s	2.50 s	4.26 s	6.83 s	39.0 in (0.99 m)	10 ft 0 in (3.05 m)	8 reps
All values from Pro Day

=== Washington Redskins / Football Team ===
Moreland was selected by the Washington Redskins in the seventh round, 227th overall, of the 2019 NFL draft. The Redskins placed him on injured reserve on December 17, 2019, after suffering a foot injury in the Week 15 game against the Philadelphia Eagles. In Week 1 against the Eagles, he recorded his first career interception off a pass thrown by Carson Wentz in a 27–17 win. Moreland was waived on August 31, 2021.

=== Houston Texans ===
Moreland was claimed off waivers by the Houston Texans on September 7, 2021. He was released on May 20, 2022.

=== Philadelphia Eagles ===
On May 23, 2022, Moreland was claimed off waivers by the Philadelphia Eagles. He was waived/injured on August 16 and placed on injured reserve. He was released on August 24.

=== New York Jets ===
On September 14, 2022, Moreland signed with the practice squad of the New York Jets. He signed a reserve/future contract on January 9, 2023. He was placed on injured reserve on August 28, 2023, after suffering a preseason hand injury. He was released on September 6.

=== Houston Roughnecks ===
On March 6, 2024, Moreland was signed by the Houston Roughnecks of the United Football League (UFL). He was released on August 7, 2024.
