= Jordan Dangerfield =

American football player (born 1990)

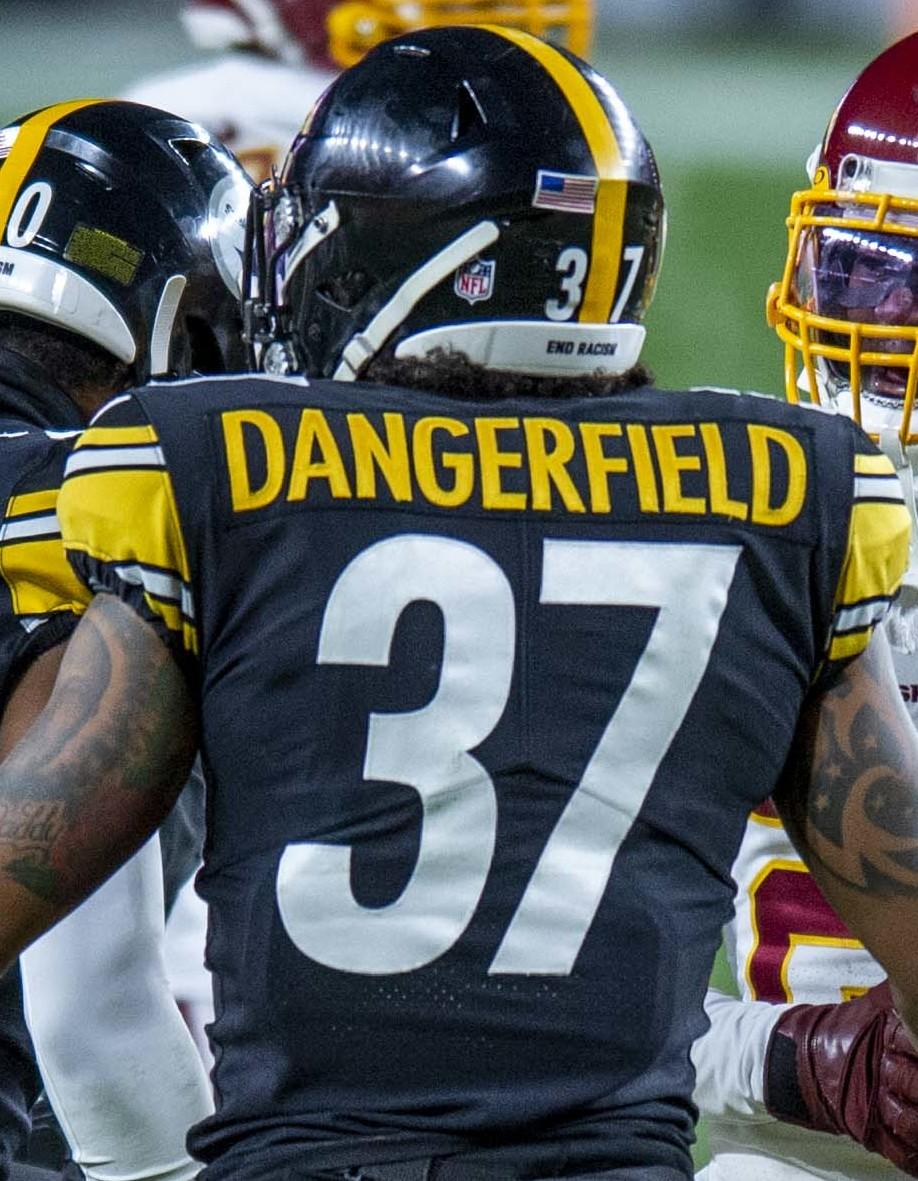
- Dangerfield with the Pittsburgh Steelers in 2020

No. 37
- Position: Safety

Personal information
- Born: December 25, 1990 (age 35); Elmont, New York, U.S.
- Listed height: 5 ft 11 in (1.80 m)
- Listed weight: 199 lb (90 kg)

Career information
- High school: Royal Palm Beach (Royal Palm Beach, Florida)
- College: Towson
- NFL draft: 2013: undrafted

Career history
- Buffalo Bills (2013)*; Pittsburgh Steelers (2014)*; Brooklyn Bolts (2014); Pittsburgh Steelers (2014–2020)
- * Offseason or practice squad member only

Career NFL statistics
- Total tackles: 46
- Forced fumbles: 1
- Fumble recoveries: 1
- Stats at Pro Football Reference

Jordan Isaac Aldon Dangerfield (born December 25, 1990) is an American former professional football player who was a safety in the National Football League (NFL). He played college football for the Towson Tigers and was signed as an undrafted free agent by the Buffalo Bills in 2013. Dangerfield was also a member of the Brooklyn Bolts of the FXFL.

== Early and personal life ==
Dangerfield was born in Elmont, New York, and is a member of the Ethiopian Jewish community.

He attended Royal Palm Beach High School in Royal Palm Beach, Florida, where he played football as a receiver and defensive back, was named to Palm Beach Post and Sun-Sentinel first-team as a junior and senior, and received second-team All-Florida honors as a senior in 2008. He then attended Hofstra University, for whom he played in eight games, and after it closed its football program he attended Towson University. In 2010 for Towson he was named first-team All-CAA and first-team All-ECAC, as well as first-team All-American by College Sports Journal, and was named Towson University's Male Athlete of the Year. In 2011 he was named first-team All-Colonial Athletic Association, and in 2012 he was named pre-season All-CAA and earned third-team pre-season All-America honors from The Sports Network.

After entering professional football, he chipped away at remaining classes at Towson and in 2019 earned his degree.

== Professional career ==
Pre-draft measurables
| Height | Weight | Arm length | Hand span | 40-yard dash | 10-yard split | 20-yard split | 20-yard shuttle | Three-cone drill | Vertical jump | Broad jump | Bench press |
|---|---|---|---|---|---|---|---|---|---|---|---|
| 5 ft 10 3/8 in (1.79 m) | 206 lb (93 kg) | 29 7/8 in (0.76 m) | 8 7/8 in (0.23 m) | 4.58 s | 1.50 s | 2.52 s | 4.21 s | 6.74 s | 41.5 in (1.05 m) | 10 ft 5 in (3.18 m) | 15 reps |
All values from Pro Day

=== Buffalo Bills ===
Dangerfield was signed by the Bills as an undrafted rookie free agent following the 2013 NFL draft. He was released by the team on August 30, 2013.

=== Pittsburgh Steelers (first stint) ===
Dangerfield signed a reserve/future contract with the Steelers on January 10, 2014. He was released on August 26, 2014.

=== Brooklyn Bolts ===
Dangerfield played for the Brooklyn Bolts of the Fall Experimental Football League in 2014.

=== Pittsburgh Steelers (second stint) ===
Dangerfield was signed to the Steelers' practice squad on November 5, 2014. He was released and re-signed to the practice squad throughout the 2014 and 2015 seasons before making the final roster in 2016.

On January 27, 2017, Dangerfield re-signed with the Steelers on a one-year deal. On September 4, Dangerfield was waived/injured by the Steelers and placed on injured reserve. He was released on September 8. He was re-signed to the practice squad on October 16. He signed a reserve/future contract with the Steelers on January 15, 2018.

On March 20, 2020, Dangerfield re-signed with the Steelers.

== See also ==
- List of select Jewish football players
