= Serenity High School =

Coordinates: 33°12′38.46″N 96°38′5.04″W

Serenity School

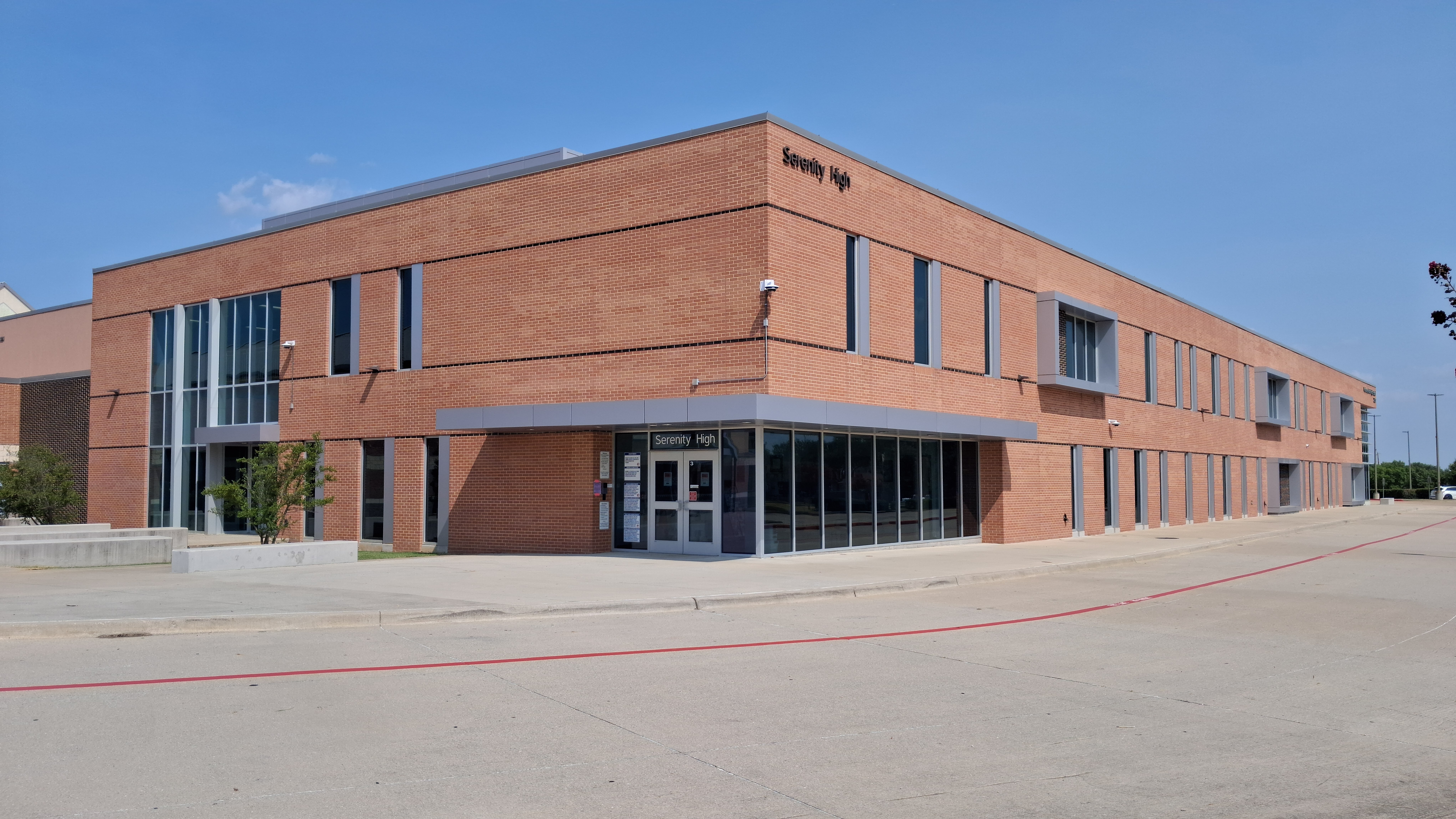
- Serenity High near McKinney North High School

Location
- 2550 Wilmeth Rd, McKinney, Texas 75071; United States

Information
- School type: Public high school, substance-abuse recovery high school
- Established: 1999
- School district: McKinney Independent School District
- Principal: Stephen Issa
- Grades: 9–12
- Student to teacher ratio: 10 to 1
- Website: https://www.mckinneyisd.net/o/sh

Serenity High is the oldest substance-abuse recovery public high school in Texas. It is located in McKinney North High School It was founded in 1999 as a partnership between the McKinney Independent School District and the Avenues Counseling Center in McKinney, Texas, and serves several school districts in and around Collin County, Texas. As of November 2008, it has served over 150 graduates from over 25 high schools. In 2017, Secondary School moved in McKinney North High School.

The school was rated Academically Acceptable in the 2009 TEA accountability rating.

== Academics ==
Serenity High offers traditional instruction, self-paced studies, online instruction, and dual-credit instruction in conjunction with Collin College. It has a student-teacher ratio of 10 to 1.

== Funding ==
Serenity High School is funded through the McKinney ISD, state funding, and private fundraising. Out-of-district students pay tuition or have their local school districts pay tuition on their behalf.

In 2002 and 2003, the school district considered closing the school due to costs. Private funds kept it open.

In the fall of 2003, the school received a $160,000 grant from the Texas Education Agency.

As of November 2008, private fundraising efforts included an annual golf tournament.

== Affiliations and accreditations ==
The school is in the McKinney Independent School District and is affiliated with the Association of Recovery Schools. In addition, students from the Anna ISD, Blue Ridge ISD, Community ISD, Farmersville ISD, Frisco ISD, Gunter ISD, Melissa ISD, Plano ISD, Rockwall ISD, and Wylie ISD may attend without paying out-of-district tuition. The school is accredited by the State of Texas but did not receive a rating for the 2007-2008 school year

== See also ==
- McKinney North High School
- McKinney ISD

== National attention ==
In 2002, federal officials considering creating similar schools in the United States said the school could serve as a national model.
