= Serene =

Serene may refer to:

- Sérène, another name for the French wine grape Servanin
- Serene (phone), a telephone jointly developed by Samsung and Bang & Olufsen
- Serene (yacht), one of the world's largest private superyachts
- Serene, Colorado, a company town in Colorado
- Jaunjelgava or Serene, a city in Latvia
- Serene, a heroine in Riviera: The Promised Land

== People with the name ==
- Serene (pianist), American classical pianist and computer scientist
- Serene Koong (born 1988), Singapore singer-songwriter
- Serene Ross (born 1977), American javelin thrower
- Serene Husseini Shahid (1920–2008), Palestinian writer

== See also ==
- Seren (disambiguation)
- Serena (disambiguation)
- Serenity (disambiguation)
