= Matt Lipka =

American baseball player (born 1992)

- Center fielder / Shortstop
- Born: April 15, 1992 (age 34); Snellville, Georgia, U.S.
- Bats: Right Throws: Right
- Stats at Baseball Reference

Matthew F. Lipka (born April 15, 1992) is an American former professional baseball center fielder and shortstop. He was drafted in the first round of the 2010 MLB draft by the Atlanta Braves.

== Professional career ==
=== Atlanta Braves ===
Lipka attended McKinney High School in McKinney, Texas. The Atlanta Braves selected Lipka in the first round (35th overall) of the 2010 MLB draft. In 2011, the Braves had Lipka shift to center field.

Lipka played for the Lynchburg Hillcats of the High–A Carolina League in 2013, and the Mississippi Braves of the Double–A Southern League in 2014. He returned to Mississippi to start the 2015 season. Lipka was reassigned to Mississippi to begin 2016. By mid-June, he had been promoted to Gwinnett. He finished 2016 with a .243 batting average and 3 homers. Lipka elected free agency following the season on November 7, 2016.

=== Texas Rangers ===
On December 16, 2016, Lipka signed a minor league contract with the Texas Rangers. He split the season between the advanced Single-A Down East Wood Ducks, Double-A Frisco RoughRiders and Triple-A Round Rock Express. In 117 games between the three affiliates, Lipka batted .241/.306/.376 with 9 home runs, 50 RBI, and 25 stolen bases. He elected free agency following the season on November 6, 2017.

=== San Francisco Giants ===
On January 29, 2018, Lipka signed a minor league contract with the San Francisco Giants organization. He played in 123 games for the Double–A Richmond Flying Squirrels, hitting .240/.329/.352 with four home runs, 30 RBI, and 21 stolen bases. Lipka elected free agency following the season on November 2.

=== New York Yankees ===
On January 11, 2019, Lipka signed a minor league deal with the New York Yankees. He received a non-roster invitation to spring training. He split the season between the Double-A Trenton Thunder and Triple-A Scranton/Wilkes-Barre RailRiders. On June 6, 2019, in a game against the Hartford Yard Goats, Lipka broke up a combined no-hitter in the top of the ninth inning with a bunt single off of Rico Garcia. The bunt caused a near fight after the game and resulted in Lipka getting death threats for the unpopular move. Lipka hit .262/.316/.388 in 89 games between the two affiliates in 2019 and became a free agent after the season.

=== Los Angeles Dodgers ===
On February 29, 2020, Lipka signed a minor league contract with the Los Angeles Dodgers. Lipka was not selected for the Dodgers player pool for the year, and did not play in a game in 2020 due to the cancellation of the minor league season because of the COVID-19 pandemic. On November 2, Lipka elected free agency.

=== Arizona Diamondbacks ===
On May 3, 2021, Lipka signed a minor league contract with the Arizona Diamondbacks organization. In 33 games between the Triple-A Reno Aces and the Double-A Amarillo Sod Poodles, Lipka slashed a cumulative .303/.364/.454 with 2 home runs and 24 RBI.

=== Milwaukee Brewers ===
On June 28, 2021, Lipka was traded to the Milwaukee Brewers in exchange for cash considerations. Lipka appeared in 70 games with the Triple-A Nashville Sounds to round out the year, hitting .285/.346/.446 with 9 home runs and 32 RBI. He elected free agency following the season on November 7.

=== Washington Nationals ===
On March 16, 2022, Lipka signed a minor league contract with the Washington Nationals. In 45 games for the Triple-A Rochester Red Wings, Lipka batted .202/.308/.269 with no home runs, six RBI, and 14 stolen bases.

=== Milwaukee Brewers (second stint) ===
On July 16, 2022, Lipka was traded to the Milwaukee Brewers in exchange for cash considerations. In 32 games for the Triple-A Nashville Sounds, he slashed .258/.337/.398 with two home runs, five RBI, and 12 stolen bases. Lipka elected free agency following the season on November 10.

== Coaching career ==
On February 5, 2025, the Milwaukee Brewers hired Lipka to serve as an associate coach for their Double-A affiliate, the Biloxi Shuckers.
