= McKinney High School =

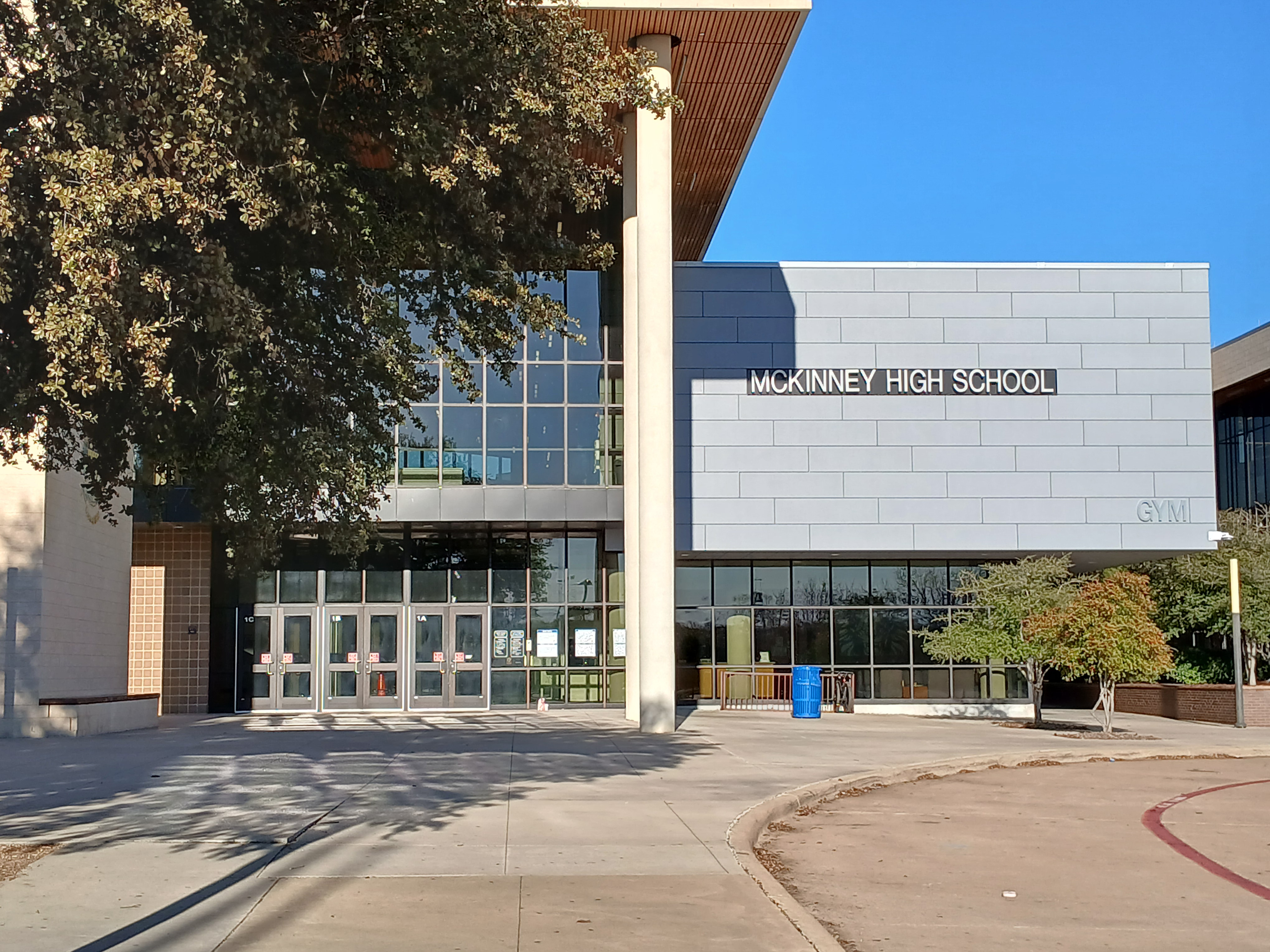
- McKinney High School Entrance

Location
- 1400 W Wilson Creek Pkwy. McKinney, Texas 75069; United States; 33.1882°N 96.63284°W

Information
- Type: Public High School
- Motto: Tradition of Excellence
- School district: McKinney Independent School District
- Principal: Paula Kent
- Staff: 181.43 (on an FTE basis)
- Grades: 9-12
- Enrollment: 2,668 (2024–2025)
- Student to teacher ratio: 14.71
- Hours in school day: 8 hours, 7 minutes
- Campus type: Suburban
- Colors: Navy blue & Gold
- Fight song: "Dear, Mckinney High School"
- Athletics conference: UIL Class 6-6A
- Mascot: Lion
- Team name: Lions
- Rival: Allen High School, McKinney Boyd High School, McKinney North High School
- Website: www.mckinneyisd.net/o/mhs

McKinney High School (MHS) also called McKinney High is located at 1400 Wilson Creek Parkway in McKinney, Texas, United States, and is within the McKinney Independent School District (MISD). MHS is the oldest high school in McKinney and the current building opened in 1986, after moving from what is now Faubion Middle School. The school underwent major renovations from 2013-2015 and added a Fine Arts/Performing Arts Center in 2018.

The Texas Education Agency (TEA) rated the school as Recognized following the 2009-10 school year, and most recently, the school is a 2022 A Rated Campus scoring 90/100.

As of 2023, GreatSchools gave MHS an overall 5/10 rating, which its data ranges from test scores to diversity, attendance, etc.

== Academics ==
Advanced Placement offerings include Art History, Biology, Calculus AB and BC, Chemistry, Computer Science Principles, Computer Science A, English Language and Composition, English Literature and Composition, Environmental Science, European History, French Language, German Language, Human Geography, Latin, Macroeconomics, Music Theory, Physics C: Mechanics, Physics C: Electricity/Magnetism, Psychology, Statistics, Spanish Language, Spanish Literature, Studio Art – 2D, 3D, and Drawing, US Government and Politics, US History, and World History.

Other 6.0 GPA classes include Computer Science 3 and 4.

== Athletics and extracurriculars ==
The McKinney Lions compete in the following sports and extracurriculars:

- Baseball
- Basketball
- Cross Country
- Football
- Golf
- Powerlifting
- Soccer
- Softball
- Swimming and Diving
- Tennis
- Track and Field
- Volleyball
- Wrestling
- Marching Band
- Theater
- Orchestra

== Controversies ==
On April 1, 2006, a Walkout occurred due to the Comprehensive Immigration Reform Act of 2006. One student was arrested, and 9 others were cited for blocking a road. The 9 students who were cited had a 3-day suspension as well.

On February 21, 2018, a walkout protesting gun violence occurred. More than 670 students were reported to have walked-out of class.

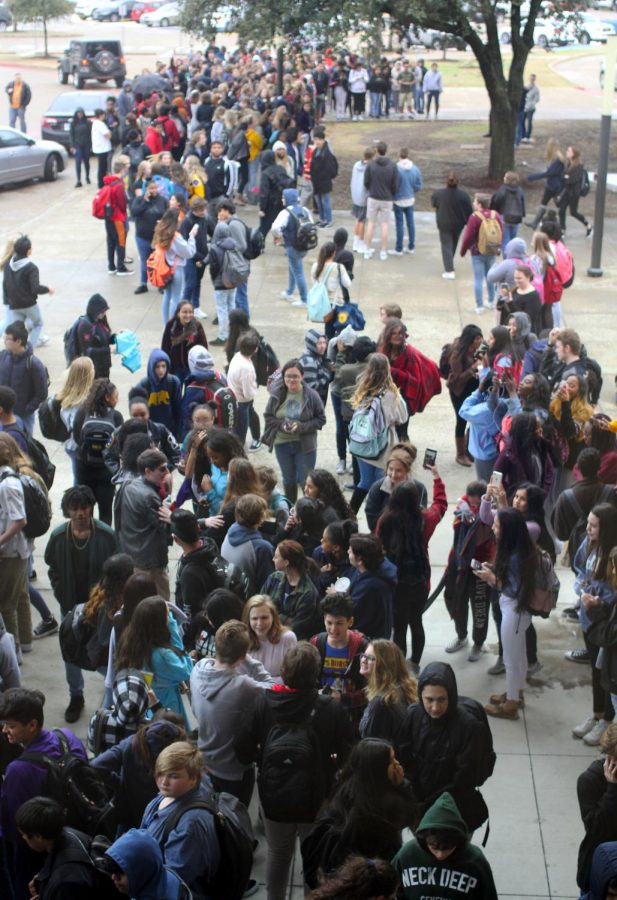
A 2018 Walkout that occurred to protest gun-violence as a result of the 19th anniversary of the 1999 Columbine High School Massacre

== Demographics ==
White: 36.7%
Hispanic: 34.5%
Black: 19.1%
Asian: 4.9%
Two or more races: 4.0%
American Indian or Native Alaskan: 0.6%
Native Hawaiian or Pacific Islander: 0.2%
Eligible for free or reduced-price lunches: 40.2%

== Notable alumni ==
- Tommy Joe Crutcher, NFL 1964-1972, Super Bowl II winner
- Akayleb Evans, NFL player
- Hobie Harris, baseball player
- Adrianna Hicks, actress
- Brittany Lang, Professional golfer
- Zach Lee, Major League Baseball player
- Matt Lipka, baseball player
- Keldric Luster, college football quarterback for the Ball State Cardinals
- Hunter Mahan, Professional golfer
- Adam Miller, Professional baseball player
- Johnny Quinn, Professional football player and U.S. Olympian (bobsled)
- Riley Pettijohn, college football player
- Jason Ralph, actor
- Robert Richardson, NASCAR Driver
- J. Michael Tatum, Anime voice actor for FUNimation
- Sammy Walker, NFL player
- Ja'Kobe Walter, NBA player
- London Woodberry, MLS- FC Dallas
- Nora Zehetner, Actress

== Zoning ==
Attendance zoning for MISD High Schools.

The zoning for this school includes the areas from South-Downtown McKinney, to areas surrounding Towne Lake, Eldorado Parkway (east of Ridge Road), McKinney National Airport, and Lucas, Texas.

== See also ==
- McKinney Boyd High School
- McKinney North High School
