= Adam Miller (baseball) =

American baseball player (born 1984)

- Pitcher
- Born: November 26, 1984 (age 41); Plano, Texas, U.S.
- Bats: Right Throws: Right
- Stats at Baseball Reference

Adam Wayne Miller (born November 26, 1984) is an American former professional baseball pitcher.

== Career ==
Miller graduated from McKinney High School in 2003 and was selected by the Cleveland Indians as a sandwich pick (31st overall) in the 2003 Major League Baseball draft. After a strong campaign in 2004 with Lake County and Kinston, elbow problems in 2005 slowed down his rise through the ranks. Miller only managed 15 starts combined between Mahoning Valley and Kinston.

Healthy again and rated as the organization's top prospect by Baseball America, his journey toward the big leagues resumed in 2008. He started the 2008 season as a starting pitcher with the Triple-A Buffalo Bisons after being placed on the 40-man roster for the Cleveland Indians in November 2007.

When healthy, Miller throws a mid-90s mph four-seam fastball, a high-80s mph slider, a sinker and a changeup.

In 2009, Miller had reconstructive surgery on the middle finger of his throwing hand. As of December 2009, Miller had four surgeries to various parts of his right arm. Miller has returned to AA Akron with the Indians organization, where reports have him hitting 94-96 MPH on the radar gun. The Indians declined to offer him a major league contract by the December 2009 non-tendering deadline, but signed him to a minor league contract December 13.

On January 4, 2012, Miller signed a minor league contract with the New York Yankees, receiving an invitation to spring training.

Miller played with the Sugar Land Skeeters of the Atlantic League of Professional Baseball in 2013. He signed a minor league contract with the Cleveland Indians to return to Minor League Baseball on March 18, 2014.

On December 18, 2014, the Pittsburgh Pirates signed Miller.
