= Seren (name) =

Female given name

- Pronunciation: /ˈsɛrən/ SERR-ən; Welsh: [ˈsɛrɛn]
- Gender: female and male

Origin
- Origin: Welsh
- Meaning: "star" (in Welsh)
- Region of origin: Wales

Seren is a given name in Welsh, and both a given name and surname in Turkish.

In Welsh, it is a female and male name meaning "star". It has become a common female name and was the third most common name for baby girls born in Wales in 2009; in 2010 Seren was the 5th most common name in Wales, and the 288th most common name for newborn girls in England.

Seren is a popular Turkish name, being a surname (including with a cedilla under the 'S'), and a feminine given name.

== Given name ==
=== Turkish ===
- Seren Serengil (b. 1971), Turkish actress and singer
- Seren Şirince (b. 1991), Turkish actress

=== Welsh ===
- Seren Bundy-Davies (b. 1994), British athlete
- Seren Gibson (b. 1988), British model
- Seren Waters (b. 1990), British-Kenyan cricketer
- Seren Jenkins (b.1992), British chef

== Surname ==
=== Turkish ===
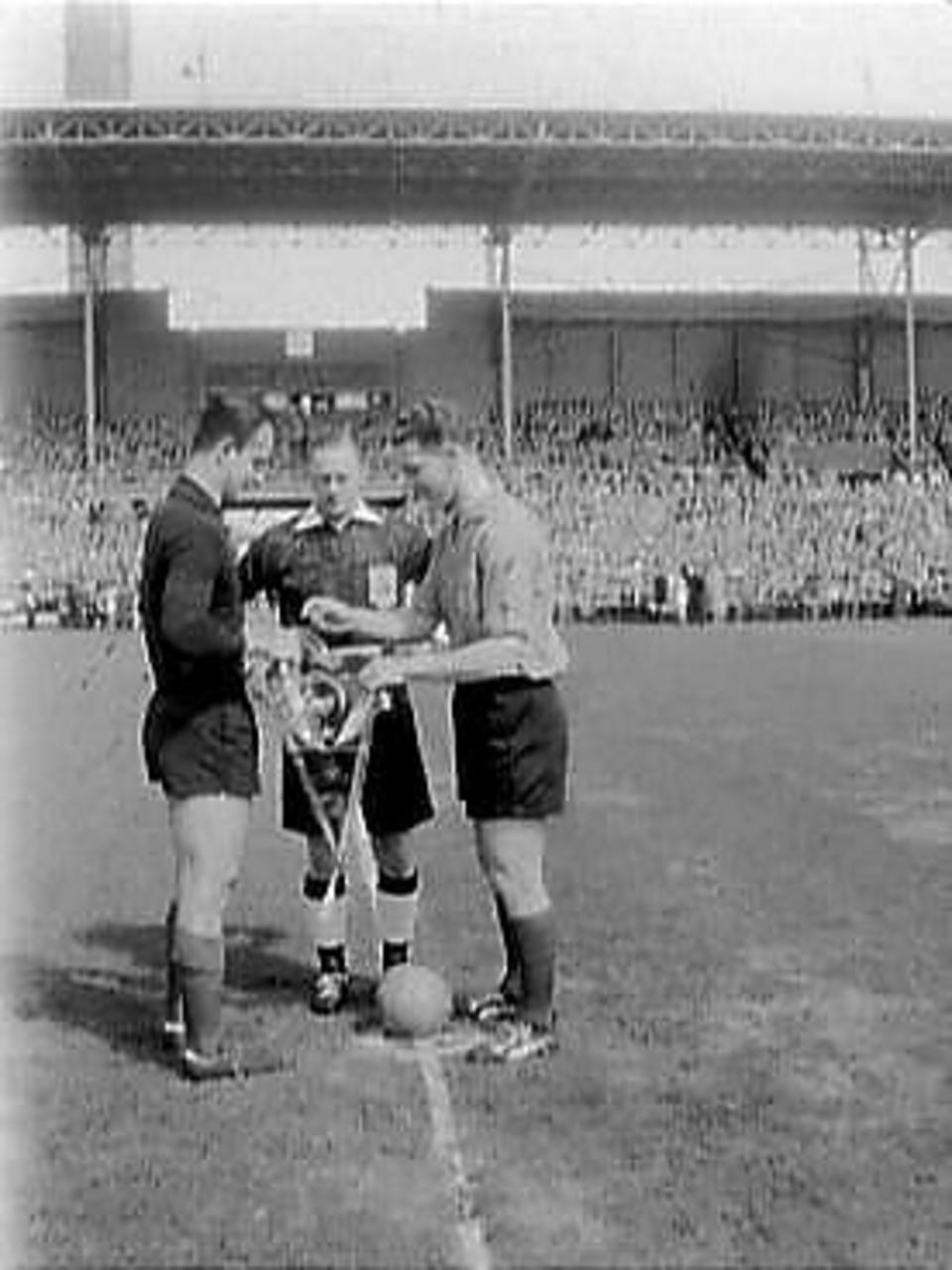
Turgay Şeren (left) in 1958

- Turgay Şeren (1932-2016), Turkish footballer

== See also ==
Ceren, a cognate name in both Turkish and Welsh
