= Royal Palm Beach High School =

Royal Palm Beach Community High School

Location
- 10600 Okeechobee Blvd; Royal Palm Beach, Florida, 33411; 26.708°N 80.2108°W

Information
- Type: High school
- Established: 1997
- School district: School District of Palm Beach County
- Principal: Dr. Shakeica Robinson
- Staff: 127.00 (FTE)
- Grades: 9–12
- Enrollment: 2,372 (2023–2024)
- Student to teacher ratio: 18.68
- Hours in school day: 7:30 AM – 2:48 PM
- Colors: Teal, Black & Silver
- Slogan: "Living the Wildcat Best is the Key to Our Success."
- Rival: Seminole Ridge High School
- Mascot: Wildcat
- Website: rpbh.palmbeachschools.org

Royal Palm Beach High School (RPBHS), also known as Royal Palm High, is a public high school in Royal Palm Beach, Florida, with an enrollment of over 2,000 students. The school is a part of the School District of Palm Beach County.

== Notable alumni ==
- Todd Centeio (born 1998), professional football quarterback
- Jeff Choquette (born 1986), stock car racing driver
- Jordan Dangerfield (born 1990), NFL player
- Kason Gabbard (born 1982), MLB pitcher
- Virginia Giuffre (1983–2025), victim of child sex offender Jeffrey Epstein
- Fred Johnson (born 1997), NFL player
- Triston McKenzie (born 1997), MLB pitcher
- Jimmy Moreland (born 1995), NFL player
- Jarrod Saltalamacchia (born 1985), MLB catcher
- Alex and Franky Venegas (born 2001), known as the Island Boys, social media personalities and hip-hop duo
