= McKinney North High School =

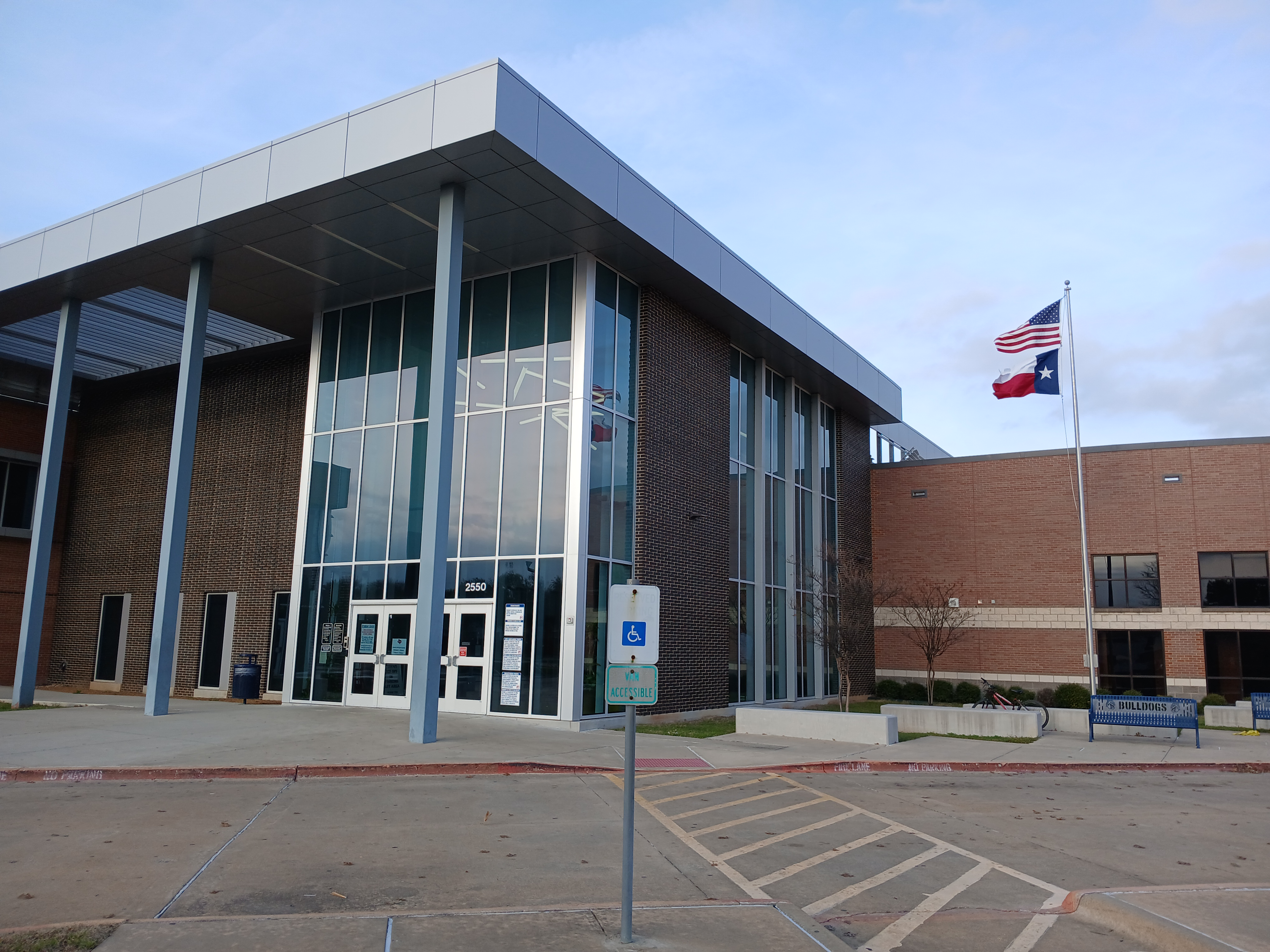
- McKinney North High School

Location
- 2550 Wilmeth Road; McKinney, Collin County, Texas 75071; United States
- 33.2311°N 96.64219°W

Information
- Type: Public High School
- Motto: Our Best is the Least We Can Do
- Established: 2000
- School district: McKinney Independent School District
- Principal: Justin Penio
- Staff: 146.06 (FTE)
- Grades: 9–12
- Enrollment: 2,387 (2024-25)
- Student to teacher ratio: 16.34
- Campus type: Suburb
- Colors: Navy & Orange
- Athletics conference: UIL 5A
- Mascot: Bulldog Duke/Duchess
- Website: www.mckinneyisd.net/o/mnhs

McKinney North High School (commonly known as North, McKinney North, or MNHS) is a public secondary school located on 2550 Wilmeth Road in McKinney, Texas, US. The school is part of the McKinney Independent School District. Mckinney North currently holds the most zoned space in McKinney. McKinney North High School opened to its first freshman class in the year 2000. North was also recently updated to a "recognized" status via the TEA.

== Academics ==
McKinney North operates on a 7:20 a.m. to 2:40 p.m. schedule, which includes seven-class periods and a twenty-six-minute lunch period. Students may not leave campus during this time due to MISD's closed campus policy.

=== Curriculum ===
As of the 2024-2025 school year, McKinney North's curriculum offers 30 Advanced Placement(AP) classes. This include classes in math, science, social studies, and English. In addition, classes in the visual and performing arts, computer science, and foreign languages are offered as well. McKinney North also offers dual credit enrollment opportunity at Collin College.

=== Demographics ===
As of the 2023-2024 school year, there were 2,311 students attending McKinney North with 135.22 teachers counted on a full time equivalency (FTE) basis for a student teacher ratio of 17.09. Around 29% of the school student population are eligible for free or reduced lunch. The student population of McKinney North High School is 42.15% White, 26.1% Hispanic, 19.3% Black, 7.23% Asian, 0.52% American Indian/Alaska Native, 0.22% Pacific Islander, and 4.5% Multiracial.

== Athletics ==
Despite the school's short history, it has managed to achieve success in a myriad of events. The MNHS Lady Bulldogs won the 2006 4A U.I.L. Texas State Championship in soccer, The baseball and softball teams also have a storied history in the playoffs making it to the State semifinals and area finals, respectively. Also, the cross-country program has qualified for the U.I.L. state championship twice and has won 5 district championships in all. Also, for Cross Country, Samantha Means won the 4A title, but also set the Texas time record. The McKinney North Tennis Team has won 8 district titles and 11 total playoff appearances. The tennis team has been ranked in the state's top 25 every year since the school has opened. Jordan Hart won back to back state tennis titles in 2012 & 2013. The lady bulldogs also placed 2nd in the 4A Basketball state championship in 2014. They also have a very successful football program making it to the playoffs for 2 straight years. In 2011, the Bulldogs finished the regular season at 6-4 and went to the playoffs for the first time in 5 years.

The McKinney North Bulldogs compete in the following sports:

- Baseball
- Basketball
- Cross Country
- Football
- Golf
- Powerlifting
- Soccer
- Softball
- Swimming & Diving
- Tennis
- Track & Field
- Volleyball
- Wrestling

== Controversies ==
In 2006, a group of cheerleaders from McKinney North High School, one of whom was Karrissa Theret, daughter of the then-school principal, Linda Theret, became notorious for truancy, rudeness in class, violations of the school's dress code and other acts of misconduct. The scandal broke into national news when the school's cheerleading coach, Michaela Ward, resigned in protest in October of that year and began talking to news and media outlets. In December 2006, the District Board hired a Dallas attorney, Harry Jones, to investigate the issue. Then-Principal Theret was placed on paid administrative leave and later retired, and the superintendent has said she would not return to the school or any other campus.

The McKinney cheerleader scandal was portrayed in 2008 in the TV movie Fab Five: The Texas Cheerleader Scandal, which Lifetime Television transmitted in August 2008; the name of the school was changed, as were the names of the students and the teachers involved. Tatum O'Neal portrayed principal Linda Theret (name changed to Lorene Tippitt), Ashley Benson Karrissa Theret (name changed to Brooke Tippitt), and Jenna Dewan coach Michaela Ward (name changed to Emma Carr). The movie was filmed in the New Orleans metropolitan area.

== Notable alumni ==
- Mike Bolsinger (2006), former MLB pitcher
- Ronald Jones II (2015), former NFL running back
- Nnamdi Madubuike (2016), All-Pro defensive end for the Baltimore Ravens
