= 2022 Simon Fraser Red Leafs football team =

American college football season

2022 Simon Fraser Red Leafs football
- Conference: Lone Star Conference
- Record: 1–9 (1–8 LSC)
- Head coach: Mike Rigell (2nd season)
- Offensive coordinator: Wayne Dickens (1st season)
- Offensive scheme: Multiple
- Defensive coordinator: Jerome Erdman (2nd season)
- Base defense: Multiple
- Home stadium: Terry Fox Field; Borderite Stadium

2022 Lone Star Conference football standings
	Conf.			Overall
Team	W		L	W		L
No. 7 Angelo State $^	9	–	0	12	–	1
Central Washington	6	–	3	6	–	4
Texas A&M–Kingsville #	5	–	4	7	–	5
Midwestern State	5	–	4	6	–	5
Western New Mexico	5	–	4	6	–	5
Western Oregon	5	–	4	6	–	5
UT Permian Basin	4	–	5	5	–	6
West Texas A&M	3	–	6	5	–	6
Eastern New Mexico	2	–	7	3	–	8
Simon Fraser	1	–	8	1	–	9
$ – Conference champion; ^ – NCAA Division II playoff participant; # – Heritage Bowl participant; Rankings from AFCA Poll

The 2022 Simon Fraser Red Leafs football team represented Simon Fraser University (SFU) in the 2022 NCAA Division II football season as a member of the Lone Star Conference (LSC). The team played most of its home games at Terry Fox Field on the university's campus in Burnaby, British Columbia, while Blaine High School in nearby Blaine, Washington hosted two games. Led by third-year head coach Mike Rigell, the Red Leafs finished the 2022 season with an overall record of 1–9, going 1–8 in LSC play to finish 10th in the conference.

This would be the Red Leafs' final season as the university announced it would be dropping football on April 4, 2023.

== Conference change and end of football program ==
The Red Leafs had previously competed as a member of the Great Northwest Athletic Conference (GNAC) since 2010; however, the GNAC dropped football after the 2021 season. Simon Fraser, along with fellow GNAC members Central Washington and Western Oregon, joined the LSC as football-only members. Following the 2022 season, the LSC announced that it would not be extending Simon Fraser's membership past the 2023–24 season.

On April 4, 2023, the university announced that it would be disbanding the football program. Earlier, on February 1, athletic director Theresa Hanson and head coach Mike Rigell released a joint statement that the Red Leafs would play in 2023; however, an internal memo written around this time, and publicly released on June 28 via Business in Vancouver, showed there were no plans to continue football past the 2023 season. The memo also suggested that the football program be dropped prior to the 2023 season as the continuation of the program was deemed to not be feasible.

== Preseason ==
=== LSC media poll ===
The LSC media poll was released on July 26, 2022. The Red Leafs were predicted to finish last in the conference.

== Schedule ==
Date	Time	Opponent	Site	Result	Attendance
September 17	1:00 p.m.	Central Washington	Terry Fox Field; Burnaby, BC	L 7–40	1,435
September 24	5:00 p.m.	at Midwestern State	Memorial Stadium; Wichita Falls, TX	L 0–77	7,693
October 1	6:00 p.m.	Texas A&M–Kingsville	Borderite Stadium; Blaine, WA	L 7–35	788
October 8	4:00 p.m.	at UT Permian Basin	Ratliff Stadium; Odessa, TX	L 24–31 ^{OT}	3,742
October 15	5:00 p.m.	at Eastern New Mexico	Greyhound Stadium; Portales, NM	L 14–42	1,856
October 22	6:00 p.m.	Western New Mexico	Terry Fox Field; Burnaby, BC	L 21–38	653
October 29	7:00 p.m.	No. 2 Angelo State	Borderite Stadium; Blaine, WA	L 0–24	400
November 5	1:00 p.m.	at Western Oregon	McArthur Field; Monmouth, OR	L 7–32	1,478
November 12	6:00 p.m.	West Texas A&M	Terry Fox Field; Burnaby, BC	W 46–14	649
December 2	7:00 p.m.	UBC*	Terry Fox Field; Burnaby, BC (Shrum Bowl)	L 17–18	2,922
*Non-conference game; Rankings from AFCA Poll released prior to the game; All times are in Pacific time

== Roster ==
2022 Simon Fraser Red Leafs football team roster
Players
Coaches
Offense

Pos.	#	Name	Class
QB	2	Brandon Niksich	Jr
WR	4	Ethan Beselt	Sr
WR	11	Robert Meadors	Sr
QB	12	Luke Duxbury	Fr
QB	14	Mustapha Yekini	So
QB	15	Key'Shaun Dorsey	Fr
QB	16	Justin Seiber	Jr
WR	17	Tomo Hursthouse	Fr
WR	18	Richard Lugumire	So
RB	23	Somto Anyadike	Sr
RB	26	Mason Glover	Sr
RB	29	Nicolas Gutierrez Soler	Fr
WR	30	Xavier Cole	Fr
RB	31	Ziad Sabry	Fr
TE	32	Dyson Glaves	Fr
RB	34	Reggie Elie	Fr
RB	35	Jett Horst	Fr
RB	37	Ethan Sutton	Fr
RB	38	Bruce Jones	Fr
WR	39	McCord Leeson	Fr
WR	40	Alexis Ferland	Fr
WR	41	Mark Arrizza	Fr
WR	42	Jeseo Kim	Fr
WR	46	Callum Hansen	Fr
TE	47	Brandon Fuchs	So
TE	47	Bryce Reuther	Fr
OL	56	Kai Tinker	So
OL	60	Robert Preda	Fr
OL	61	Charlie Evans	Jr
OL	62	Jacob Anderson	So
OL	64	Anthony Bolaños	Fr
OL	66	Christian Butenschoen	Jr
OL	69	Jordan Sye	Fr
OL	70	Reuben Buchanan	Jr
OL	71	Connor Burns	So
RB	72	Isaac Antilla	Fr
OL	75	Mark Ruby	Jr
OL	77	Maliq Washington	So
WR	79	Nolan Dochuk	Fr
TE	80	Aiden Domino	Fr
TE	81	Dylan McBratney	So
WR	82	Sam Davenport	So
WR	83	Aidan Pearce	Sr
TE	84	Jacob Pohl	So
WR	85	Brandon Johnson	So
WR	85	Drew Wootton	Fr
WR	86	Andrew Hunt	So
TE	87	Dakota Lepine	So
TE	89	Shaan Bodwal	Fr
OL	92	Isaac Dharamsi	Fr
TE		Charles Dubras	Fr

Defense

Pos.	#	Name	Class
DB	1	Gideone Kremler	So
DB	3	Joshua Phillips Verdugo	Sr
DB	5	Damon Lynch	Sr
DB	6	Khaleeb Webb	Sr
DB	8	Jerrell Cummings	Jr
LB	9	Drew Nicholson	Jr
DB	10	Evan Currie	Jr
DB	13	Kyle Huish	So
DB	19	Kimo Hiu	So
DB	20	Antonio Cusati	Fr
LB	21	Jacob Wade	Jr
DB	22	Riley Berfelo	Fr
DB	24	Ryan Barthelson	Jr
DB	25	Johari Hastings	So
DB	27	Drew Lirag	So
DB	28	Evan Mak	Fr
DB	30	Kieran Pama	Fr
DB	31	Massimo Ryan	Fr
DB	32	Giovanni Linuzzi	Fr
DB	33	Aiden Jones	Fr
DB	36	Jean-Oliver Pitte	So
LB	43	James Knibbs	Fr
DL	44	Evan Nolli	Jr
LB	45	Dayton Ingenhaag	So
LB	49	Isaac Muckian	Sr
DL	50	Ishmael Togi	So
DL	51	Jacob Wiggins	Jr
LB	52	Isaiah Cooper	Fr
LB	53	Alex Gagnon	Fr
LB	54	Tank Brewster	So
LB	55	Aiden Thomas	Fr
LB	57	Colin McKellar	Fr
LB	58	Matteo Trasolini	Fr
LB	59	Tom Wiggin	Fr
DL	65	Luca Iallonardo	So
DL	90	Josh Wakely	Fr
DL	91	Aidan Eastbrooks	So
DL	93	Lorenzo Brannon	So
DL	94	Ryen Sanford	Jr
DL	95	Cameron Keeskotagan	Fr
DL	96	Riku Kasuga	Jr
DL	97	Jeremiah Famor	Sr
DL	98	Juan Valle	Fr
DL	99	Devin Pott	Sr

Special teams

Pos.	#	Name	Class
K	32	Giovanni Linuzzi	Fr
LS	48	Andrew Goodman	Fr
P	82	Sam Davenport	So
K	88	Kristie Elliott	Jr

Head coach

- Mike Rigell

Coordinators/assistant coaches

- Wayne Dickens
  Offensive coordinator/Quarterbacks
- Jerome Erdman
  Defensive coordinator/Defensive line
- David Mickens
  Special teams coordinator
- Nicolas Klingshirn
  Tight ends
- Clint Uttley
  Linebackers
- Burtland Cummings
  Cornerbacks
- Eric Taylor
  Receivers
- Ian Sinclair
  Offensive line
- Tod Shackelford
  Running backs
- Cory Doughman
  Defensive line

Legend

- (C) Team captain
- (S) Suspended
- (I) Ineligible
- Injured
- Redshirt

Roster
Last update: December 31, 2023

== Game summaries ==
=== Central Washington ===
Central Washington Wildcats at Simon Fraser Red Leafs – Game summary

Quarter	1	2	3	4	Total
Wildcats	6	28	3	3	40
Red Leafs	0	0	7	0	7

at Terry Fox Field, Burnaby, British Columbia

- Date: September 17
- Game time: 1:00 p.m. PDT
- Game weather: Cloudy, 18 °C (64 °F)
- Game attendance: 1,435
- Referee: M. Livingston
- Box score, Recap

Game information
First quarter
- CWU – Tre'jon Henderson 38-yard run (run failed), 13:22. Wildcats 6–0. Drive: 4 plays, 46 yards, 1:30.

Second quarter

- CWU – Quincey Glasper 2-yard run (Jude Mullette kick), 10:41. Wildcats 13–0. Drive: 9 plays, 81 yards, 4:13.
- CWU – Tre'jon Henderson 2-yard run (Jude Mullette kick), 9:01. Wildcats 20–0. Drive: 3 plays, 54 yards, 0:39.
- CWU – Darius Morrison 17-yard pass from Quincey Glasper (Jude Mullette kick), 3:42. Wildcats 27–0. Drive: 5 plays, 63 yards, 2:36.
- CWU – Payton Glasser 26-yard pass from Quincey Glasper (Jude Mullette kick), 1:26. Wildcats 34–0. Drive: 2 plays, 36 yards, 0:37.

Third quarter

- SFU – Ethan Beselt 61-yard pass from Justin Seiber (Kristie Elliott kick), 13:23. Wildcats 34–7. Drive: 4 plays, 75 yards, 1:37.
- CWU – Jude Mullette 37-yard field goal, 2:24. Wildcats 37–7. Drive: 6 plays, 14 yards, 2:45.

Fourth quarter

- CWU – Jude Mullette 25-yard field goal, 9:13. Wildcats 40–7. Drive: 10 plays, 70 yards, 4:56.

Statistics	CWU	SFU
First downs	27	11
Total yards	523	153
Rushing yards	250	57
Passing yards	273	96
Turnovers	2	0
Time of possession	32:23	27:37

Team	Category	Player	Statistics
Central Washington	Passing	Quincey Glasper	12/20, 231 yards, 2 TD, INT
Central Washington	Rushing	Tre'jon Henderson	17 rushes, 91 yards, 2 TD
Central Washington	Receiving	Darius Morrison	4 receptions, 78 yards, TD
Simon Fraser	Passing	Justin Seiber	9/19, 141 yards, TD
Simon Fraser	Rushing	Somto Anyadike	19 rushes, 36 yards
Simon Fraser	Receiving	Ethan Beselt	4 receptions, 91 yards, TD

=== At Midwestern State ===
Simon Fraser Red Leafs at Midwestern State Mustangs – Game summary

Quarter	1	2	3	4	Total
Red Leafs	0	0	0	0	0
Mustangs	14	28	28	7	77

at Memorial Stadium, Wichita Falls, Texas

- Date: September 24
- Game time: 5:00 p.m. PDT/7:00 p.m. CDT
- Game weather: Clear, 96 °F (36 °C)
- Game attendance: 7,693
- Referee: Brad Frisby
- Box score, Recap

Game information
First quarter
- MSU – K'Vonte Jackson 8-yard run (Ritse Vaes kick), 12:48. Mustangs 7–0. Drive: 2 plays, 12 yards, 0:42.
- MSU – Dillon Sterling-Cole 1-yard run (Ritse Vaes kick), 6:14. Mustangs 14–0. Drive: 9 plays, 75 yards, 3:05.

Second quarter

- MSU – Peyton Shaw 2-yard run (Ritse Vaes kick), 11:31. Mustangs 21–0. Drive: 7 plays, 61 yards, 2:38.
- MSU – Ja'Juan Mason 35-yard pass from Dillon Sterling-Cole (Ritse Vaes kick), 9:49. Mustangs 28–0. Drive: 1 play, 50 yards, 0:07.
- MSU – Devin Cross 7-yard run (Ritse Vaes kick), 6:38. Mustangs 35–0. Drive: 6 plays, 61 yards, 2:18.
- MSU – Devin Cross 7-yard run (Ritse Vaes kick), 1:35. Mustangs 42–0. Drive: 8 plays, 43 yards, 3:14.

Third quarter

- MSU – Peyton Shaw 4-yard run (Ritse Vaes kick), 11:12. Mustangs 49–0. Drive: 8 plays, 75 yards, 3:48.
- MSU – Christian Henry 42-yard pass from Neiko Hollins (Ritse Vaes kick), 5:58. Mustangs 56–0. Drive: 5 plays, 74 yards, 3:00.
- MSU – Braxton Ash 45-yard run (Ritse Vaes kick), 1:54. Mustangs 63–0. Drive: 1 play, 45 yards, 0:23.
- MSU – Peyton Shaw 2-yard punt return (Ritse Vaes kick), 0:10. Mustangs 70–0.

Fourth quarter

- MSU – Braxton Ash 5-yard run (Ritse Vaes kick), 11:23. Mustangs 77–0. Drive: 7 plays, 33 yards, 3:37.

Statistics	SFU	MSU
First downs	2	34
Total yards	61	597
Rushing yards	30	377
Passing yards	31	220
Turnovers	3	0
Time of possession	22:30	37:30

Team	Category	Player	Statistics
Simon Fraser	Passing	Justin Seiber	7/16, 29 yards, INT
Simon Fraser	Rushing	Mason Glover	12 rushes, 20 yards
Simon Fraser	Receiving	Somto Anyadike	1 reception, 9 yards
Midwestern State	Passing	Dillon Sterling-Cole	11/14, 126 yards, TD
Midwestern State	Rushing	Braxton Ash	19 rushes, 150 yards, 2 TD
Midwestern State	Receiving	Ja'Juan Mason	3 receptions, 55 yards, TD

=== Texas A&M–Kingsville ===
Texas A&M Kingsville Javelinas at Simon Fraser Red Leafs – Game summary

Quarter	1	2	3	4	Total
Javelinas	21	7	0	7	35
Red Leafs	0	0	7	0	7

at Borderite Stadium, Blaine, Washington

- Date: October 1
- Game time: 6:00 p.m. PDT
- Game weather: Sunny and warm, 19 °C (66 °F)
- Game attendance: 788
- Referee: Seth Niesen
- Box score, Recap

Game information
First quarter
- TAMUK – Jacob Cavazos 4-yard run (Gilbert Garza kick), 8:49. Javelinas 7–0. Drive: 14 plays, 77 yards, 6:02.
- TAMUK – Zaraivion Armendarez 41-yard pass from Jacob Cavazos (Gilbert Garza kick), 6:42. Javelinas 14–0. Drive: 2 plays, 41 yards, 0:15.
- TAMUK – Christian Anderson 1-yard run (Gilbert Garza kick), 1:36. Javelinas 21–0. Drive: 10 plays, 43 yards, 4:07.

Second quarter

- TAMUK – Allen Arclies 4-yard pass from Jacob Cavazos (Gilbert Garza kick), 0:04. Javelinas 28–0. Drive: 14 plays, 99 yards, 2:30.

Third quarter

- SFU – Sam Davenport 40-yard pass from Justin Seiber (Kristie Elliott kick), 2:43. Javelinas 28–7. Drive: 1 play, 40 yards, 0:09.

Fourth quarter

- TAMUK – Walker Ring 21-yard pass from Jacob Cavazos (Gilbert Garza kick), 12:56. Javelinas 35–7. Drive: 12 plays, 80 yards, 4:40.

Statistics	TAMUK	SFU
First downs	28	13
Total yards	457	300
Rushing yards	252	49
Passing yards	205	251
Turnovers	1	3
Time of possession	35:07	24:53

Team	Category	Player	Statistics
Texas A&M–Kingsville	Passing	Jacob Cavazos	20/33, 199 yards, 3 TD, INT
Texas A&M–Kingsville	Rushing	Christian Anderson	14 rushes, 81 yards, TD
Texas A&M–Kingsville	Receiving	Zaraivion Armendarez	3 receptions, 63 yards, TD
Simon Fraser	Passing	Justin Seiber	18/27, 251 yards, TD, INT
Simon Fraser	Rushing	Somto Anyadike	14 rushes, 42 yards
Simon Fraser	Receiving	Sam Davenport	6 receptions, 115 yards, TD

=== At UT Permian Basin ===
Simon Fraser Red Leafs at UT Permian Basin Falcons – Game summary

Quarter	1	2	3	4	OT	Total
Red Leafs	0	9	7	8	0	24
Falcons	7	14	0	3	7	31

at Ratliff Stadium, Odessa, Texas

- Date: October 8
- Game time: 4:00 p.m. PDT/6:00 p.m. CDT
- Game weather: Sunny
- Game attendance: 3,742
- Referee: Joe Greer
- Box score, Recap

Game information
First quarter
- TPB – Gunnar Abseck 19-yard pass from Dylan Graham (Carson Roberts kick), 7:37. Falcons 7–0. Drive: 9 plays, 74 yards, 3:12.

Second quarter

- TPB – Brock Johnson 11-yard pass from MJ Link (Carson Roberts kick), 13:50. Falcons 14–0. Drive: 12 plays, 80 yards, 3:58.
- SFU – Dylan Graham sacked in end zone, 9:08. Falcons 14–2.
- TPB – M. J. Link 93-yard pass from Dylan Graham (Carson Roberts kick), 6:58. Falcons 21–2. Drive: 3 plays, 96 yards, 0:41.
- SFU – Robert Meadors 12-yard pass from Justin Seiber (Kristie Elliott kick), 2:13. Falcons 21–9. Drive: 4 plays, 80 yards, 2:25.

Third quarter

- SFU – Ethan Beselt 39-yard pass from Justin Seiber (Kristie Elliott kick), 5:14. Falcons 21–16. Drive: 8 plays, 89 yards, 3:34.

Fourth quarter

- TPB – Carson Roberts 20-yard field goal, 12:22. Falcons 24–16. Drive: 7 plays, 65 yards, 2:42.
- SFU – Sam Davenport 6-yard pass from Justin Seiber (Justin Seiber pass to Robert Meadors), 3:13. Tied 24–24. Drive: 4 plays, 76 yards, 2:25.

Overtime

- TPB – Kory Harris 1-yard run (Carson Roberts kick). Falcons 31–24. Drive: 7 plays, 25 yards.

Statistics	SFU	TPB
First downs	19	25
Total yards	417	462
Rushing yards	21	150
Passing yards	396	312
Turnovers	1	1
Time of possession	33:53	26:07

Team	Category	Player	Statistics
Simon Fraser	Passing	Justin Seiber	23/39, 396 yards, 3 TD, INT
Simon Fraser	Rushing	Mason Glover	8 rushes, 17 yards
Simon Fraser	Receiving	Ethan Beselt	8 receptions, 223 yards, TD
UT Permian Basin	Passing	Dylan Graham	28/40, 301 yards, 2 TD, INT
UT Permian Basin	Rushing	Antonio Malone	21 rushes, 110 yards
UT Permian Basin	Receiving	M. J. Link	8 receptions, 141 yards, TD

=== At Eastern New Mexico ===
Simon Fraser Red Leafs at Eastern New Mexico Greyhounds – Game summary

Quarter	1	2	3	4	Total
Red Leafs	0	6	8	0	14
Greyhounds	14	21	0	7	42

at Greyhound Stadium, Portales, New Mexico

- Date: October 15
- Game time: 5:00 p.m. PDT/6:00 p.m. MDT
- Game weather: Cloudy, 81 °F (27 °C)
- Game attendance: 1,856
- Referee: Jason Hickey
- Box score, Recap

Game information
First quarter
- ENM – Greg Thomas 11-yard pass from Kason Martin (Cooper Hamilton kick), 8:06. Greyhounds 7–0. Drive: 12 plays, 63 yards, 5:47.
- ENM – Caden Ochoa 12-yard fumble return (Cooper Hamilton kick), 7:48. Greyhounds 14–0.

Second quarter

- SFU – Ethan Beselt 2-yard pass from Justin Seiber (kick failed), 14:48. Greyhounds 14–6. Drive: 17 plays, 75 yards, 8:00.
- ENM – Bryzai White 20-yard pass from Kason Martin (Cooper Hamilton kick), 11:56. Greyhounds 21–6. Drive: 6 plays, 75 yards, 2:52.
- ENM – Asa Wondeh 45-yard pass from Kason Martin (Cooper Hamilton kick), 8:19. Greyhounds 28–6. Drive: 3 plays, 64 yards, 1:22.
- ENM – Isaiah Tate 2-yard run (Cooper Hamilton kick), 0:26. Greyhounds 35–6. Drive: 6 plays, 43 yards, 1:37.

Third quarter

- SFU – Ethan Beselt 6-yard pass from Justin Seiber (Justin Seiber pass to Ethan Beselt), 1:31. Greyhounds 35–14. Drive: 16 plays, 76 yards, 7:21.

Fourth quarter

- ENM – Asa Wondeh 1-yard pass from Kason Martin (Cooper Hamilton kick), 5:55. Greyhounds 42–14. Drive: 6 plays, 47 yards, 3:17.

Statistics	SFU	ENM
First downs	14	19
Total yards	196	366
Rushing yards	4	92
Passing yards	192	274
Turnovers	1	0
Time of possession	31:29	28:31

Team	Category	Player	Statistics
Simon Fraser	Passing	Justin Seiber	23/40, 192 yards, 2 TD
Simon Fraser	Rushing	Mason Glover	9 rushes, 34 yards
Simon Fraser	Receiving	Robert Meadors	8 receptions, 75 yards
Eastern New Mexico	Passing	Kason Martin	21/30, 274 yards, 4 TD
Eastern New Mexico	Rushing	Isaiah Tate	24 rushes, 107 yards, TD
Eastern New Mexico	Receiving	Asa Wondeh	6 receptions, 79 yards, 2 TD

=== Western New Mexico ===
Western New Mexico Mustangs at Simon Fraser Red Leafs – Game summary

Quarter	1	2	3	4	Total
Mustangs	21	10	7	0	38
Red Leafs	0	6	8	7	21

at Terry Fox Field, Burnaby, British Columbia

- Date: October 22
- Game time: 6:00 p.m. PDT
- Game weather: Sun with clouds, 10 °C (50 °F)
- Game attendance: 653
- Referee: Tremian Williams
- Box score, Recap

Game information
First quarter
- WNM – Devin Larson 54-yard run (Adrian Zamudio kick), 6:56. Mustangs 7–0. Drive: 6 plays, 90 yards, 2:32.
- WNM – Jamon Chambers 6-yard run (Adrian Zamudio kick), 4:50. Mustangs 14–0. Drive: 6 plays, 36 yards, 1:50.
- WNM – Dejonte Thomas 35-yard pass from Devin Larson (Adrian Zamudio kick), 2:03. Mustangs 21–0. Drive: 2 plays, 55 yards, 0:39.

Second quarter

- WNM – Devin Moore 8-yard run (Adrian Zamudio kick), 11:29. Mustangs 28–0. Drive: 8 plays, 80 yards, 3:20.
- WNM – Adrian Zamudio 23-yard field goal, 3:42. Mustangs 31–0. Drive: 14 plays, 54 yards, 5:50.
- SFU – Sam Davenport 1-yard pass from Justin Seiber (kick failed), 0:04. Mustangs 31–6. Drive: 13 plays, 75 yards, 3:30.

Third quarter

- WNM – Charles Byers 44-yard pass from Devin Larson (Adrian Zamudio kick), 14:18. Mustangs 38–6. Drive: 2 plays, 52 yards, 0:34.
- SFU – Aidan Pearce 4-yard pass from Justin Seiber (Justin Seiber pass to Aiden Domino), 5:22. Mustangs 38–14. Drive: 5 plays, 32 yards, 1:54.

Fourth quarter

- SFU – Key'Shaun Dorsey 7-yard run (Kristie Elliott kick), 1:51. Mustangs 38–21. Drive: 7 plays, 80 yards, 3:31.

Statistics	WNM	SFU
First downs	26	19
Total yards	452	273
Rushing yards	241	95
Passing yards	211	178
Turnovers	4	4
Time of possession	28:59	31:01

Team	Category	Player	Statistics
Western New Mexico	Passing	Devin Larson	21/30, 211 yards, 2 TD, INT
Western New Mexico	Rushing	Devin Larson	5 rushes, 80 yards, TD
Western New Mexico	Receiving	Charles Byers	4 receptions, 57 yards, TD
Simon Fraser	Passing	Justin Seiber	15/29, 171 yards, 2 TD, 3 INT
Simon Fraser	Rushing	Somto Anyadike	16 rushes, 74 yards
Simon Fraser	Receiving	Aidan Pearce	5 receptions, 70 yards, TD

=== No. 2 Angelo State ===
No. 2 Angelo State Rams at Simon Fraser Red Leafs – Game summary

Quarter	1	2	3	4	Total
No. 2 Rams	14	3	7	0	24
Red Leafs	0	0	0	0	0

at Borderite Stadium, Blaine, Washington

- Date: October 29
- Game time: 7:00 p.m. PDT
- Game weather: Cold and cloudy, 12 °C (54 °F)
- Game attendance: 400
- Referee: Tim Gloudeman
- Box score, Recap

Game information
First quarter
- ASU – Cade Fuller 9-yard run (Asa Fuller kick), 10:32. Rams 7–0. Drive: 11 plays, 75 yards, 4:19.
- ASU – Kason Philips 4-yard run (Asa Fuller kick), 4:28. Rams 14–0. Drive: 11 plays, 61 yards, 5:03.

Second quarter

- ASU – Asa Fuller 21-yard field goal, 9:25. Rams 17–0. Drive: 12 plays, 60 yards, 4:44.

Third quarter

- ASU – Kason Philips 6-yard run (Asa Fuller kick), 6:42. Rams 24–0. Drive: 5 plays, 52 yards, 2:18.

Fourth quarter

- No scoring plays

Statistics	ASU	SFU
First downs	28	4
Total yards	428	55
Rushing yards	238	16
Passing yards	190	39
Turnovers	0	0
Time of possession	40:12	19:48

Team	Category	Player	Statistics
Angelo State	Passing	Zack Bronkhorst	18/30, 190 yards
Angelo State	Rushing	Kason Philips	23 rushes, 111 yards, 2 TD
Angelo State	Receiving	Kason Philips	4 receptions, 44 yards
Simon Fraser	Passing	Justin Seiber	7/20, 39 yards
Simon Fraser	Rushing	Somto Anyadike	10 rushes, 19 yards
Simon Fraser	Receiving	Aidan Pearce	3 receptions, 17 yards

=== At Western Oregon ===
Simon Fraser Red Leafs at Western Oregon Wolves – Game summary

Quarter	1	2	3	4	Total
Red Leafs	0	7	0	0	7
Wolves	13	13	6	0	32

at McArthur Field, Monmouth, Oregon

- Date: November 5
- Game time: 1:00 p.m. PDT
- Game weather: Cloudy, 52 °F (11 °C)
- Game attendance: 1,478
- Referee: Seth Niesen
- Box score, Recap

Game information
First quarter
- WOU – Omari Land 6-yard run (kick failed), 7:43. Wolves 6–0. Drive: 9 plays, 51 yards, 5:03.
- WOU – Kade Hustler 18-yard pass from Gannon Winker (Charlie Shulkin kick), 0:03. Wolves 13–0. Drive: 11 plays, 91 yards, 4:35.

Second quarter

- WOU – Thomas Wright 10-yard run (run failed), 14:00. Wolves 19–0. Drive: 1 play, 10 yards, 0:09.
- WOU – Marquis Simpson 13-yard run (Charlie Shulkin kick), 3:56. Wolves 26–0. Drive: 10 plays, 67 yards, 5:23.
- SFU – Ethan Beselt 38-yard pass from Justin Seiber (Kristie Elliott kick), 2:02. Wolves 26–7. Drive: 7 plays, 77 yards, 1:48.

Third quarter

- WOU – Thomas Wright 5-yard pass from Gannon Winker (kick failed), 9:49. Wolves 32–7. Drive: 10 plays, 78 yards, 5:05.

Fourth quarter

- No scoring plays

Statistics	SFU	WOU
First downs	9	28
Total yards	171	452
Rushing yards	30	257
Passing yards	141	195
Turnovers	1	0
Time of possession	20:07	39:53

Team	Category	Player	Statistics
Simon Fraser	Passing	Justin Seiber	11/30, 136 yards, TD
Simon Fraser	Rushing	Sam Davenport	1 rush, 26 yards
Simon Fraser	Receiving	Ethan Beselt	4 receptions, 71 yards, TD
Western Oregon	Passing	Gannon Winker	16/21, 163 yards, 2 TD
Western Oregon	Rushing	Omari Land	20 rushes, 97 yards, TD
Western Oregon	Receiving	Thomas Wright	5 receptions, 76 yards, TD

=== West Texas A&M ===
West Texas A&M Buffaloes at Simon Fraser Red Leafs – Game summary

Quarter	1	2	3	4	Total
Buffaloes	7	0	0	7	14
Red Leafs	10	22	14	0	46

at Terry Fox Field, Burnaby, British Columbia

- Date: November 12
- Game time: 6:00 p.m. PST
- Game weather: Clear, 5 °C (41 °F)
- Game attendance: 649
- Referee: Cameron McNie
- Box score, Recap

Game information
First quarter
- SFU – Aiden Domino 5-yard pass from Justin Seiber (Kristie Elliott kick), 8:48. Red Leafs 7–0. Drive: 11 plays, 60 yards, 6:12.
- WTAM – Shakell Brown 1-yard run (Gage Urias kick), 5:36. Tied 7–7. Drive: 10 plays, 51 yards, 3:09.
- SFU – Giovanni Linuzzi 34-yard field goal, 1:45. Red Leafs 10–7. Drive: 9 plays, 51 yards, 3:46.

Second quarter

- SFU – Ethan Beselt 6-yard pass from Justin Seiber (Kristie Elliott kick), 12:14. Red Leafs 17–7. Drive: 8 plays, 69 yards, 3:29.
- SFU – Ethan Beselt 34-yard pass from Justin Seiber (kick failed), 8:17. Red Leafs 23–7. Drive: 3 plays, 55 yards, 1:24.
- SFU – Nick Gerber sacked in end zone by Tank Brewster, 6:41. Red Leafs 25–7.
- SFU – Sam Davenport 2-yard pass from Justin Seiber (Kristie Elliott kick), 1:56. Red Leafs 32–7. Drive: 8 plays, 37 yards, 4:34.

Third quarter

- SFU – Somto Anyadike 1-yard run (Kristie Elliott kick), 10:06. Red Leafs 39–7. Drive: 7 plays, 46 yards, 3:37.
- SFU – Robert Meadors 8-yard pass from Justin Seiber (Kristie Elliott kick), 4:51. Red Leafs 46–7. Drive: 7 plays, 68 yards, 4:26.

Fourth quarter

- WTAM – Jarrod Compton 14-yard run (Gage Urias kick), 8:30. Red Leafs 46–14. Drive: 7 plays, 91 yards, 2:33.

Statistics	WTAM	SFU
First downs	19	25
Total yards	197	465
Rushing yards	64	115
Passing yards	133	350
Turnovers	2	0
Time of possession	21:16	38:44

Team	Category	Player	Statistics
West Texas A&M	Passing	Nick Gerber	13/23, 98 yards
West Texas A&M	Rushing	Jarrod Compton	6 rushes, 45 yards, TD
West Texas A&M	Receiving	Noah Bogardus	5 receptions, 37 yards
Simon Fraser	Passing	Justin Seiber	24/34, 293 yards, 5 TD
Simon Fraser	Rushing	Somto Anyadike	19 rushes, 82 yards, TD
Simon Fraser	Receiving	Sam Davenport	7 receptions, 156 yards, TD

=== UBC ===
UBC Thunderbirds at Simon Fraser Red Leafs – Game summary

Quarter	1	2	3	4	Total
Thunderbirds	0	0	6	12	18
Red Leafs	0	3	0	14	17

at Terry Fox Field, Burnaby, British Columbia

- Date: December 2
- Game time: 7:00 p.m. PST
- Game weather: Clear, 0 °C (32 °F)
- Game attendance: 2,922
- Referee: Seth Niesen
- Box score, Recap

Game information
First quarter
- No scoring plays

Second quarter

- SFU – Giovanni Linuzzi 25-yard field goal, 6:11. Red Leafs 3–0. Drive: 5 plays, 26 yards, 2:16.

Third quarter

- UBC – Edgerrin Williams 18-yard pass from Derek Engel (kick blocked), 6:13. Thunderbirds 6–3. Drive: 8 plays, 44 yards, 2:58.

Fourth quarter

- SFU – Ethan Beselt 55-yard pass from Justin Seiber (Kristie Elliott kick), 13:24. Red Leafs 10–6. Drive: 2 plays, 89 yards, 0:43.
- UBC – Dane Kapler 17-yard run (pass failed), 10:41. Thunderbirds 12–10. Drive: 2 plays, 17 yards, 0:19.
- SFU – Mason Glover 2-yard run (Kristie Elliott kick), 1:36. Red Leafs 17–12. Drive: 8 plays, 91 yards, 3:14.
- UBC – Derek Engel 1-yard run (run failed), 0:25. Thunderbirds 18–17. Drive: 12 plays, 65 yards, 1:11.

Statistics	UBC	SFU
First downs	21	11
Total yards	346	249
Rushing yards	135	-12
Passing yards	211	261
Turnovers	4	2
Time of possession	31:12	28:48

Team	Category	Player	Statistics
UBC	Passing	Derek Engel	20/36, 211 yards, TD, INT
UBC	Rushing	Dane Kapler	15 rushes, 85 yards, TD
UBC	Receiving	Edgerrin Williams	9 receptions, 76 yards, TD
Simon Fraser	Passing	Justin Seiber	18/25, 261 yards, TD
Simon Fraser	Rushing	Mason Glover	13 rushes, 59 yards, TD
Simon Fraser	Receiving	Ethan Beselt	4 receptions, 106 yards, TD
