= 2022 Angelo State Rams football team =

American college football season

2022 Angelo State Rams football

LSC champion

NCAA Division II Quarterfinal, L 24–42 vs. Colorado Mines
- Conference: Lone Star Conference

Ranking
- AFCA: No. 7
- Record: 12–1 (9–0 LSC)
- Head coach: Jeff Girsch (5th season)
- Offensive coordinator: Kevin Kilmer (4th season)
- Offensive scheme: Spread
- Defensive coordinator: Adam Clark (4th season)
- Base defense: 3–3–5
- Home stadium: LeGrand Sports Complex

2022 Lone Star Conference football standings
| | Conf. | | | Overall |
| Team | W | | L | W | | L |
|---|---|---|---|---|---|---|
| No. 7 Angelo State $^ | 9 | – | 0 | 12 | – | 1 |
| Central Washington | 6 | – | 3 | 6 | – | 4 |
| Texas A&M–Kingsville # | 5 | – | 4 | 7 | – | 5 |
| Midwestern State | 5 | – | 4 | 6 | – | 5 |
| Western New Mexico | 5 | – | 4 | 6 | – | 5 |
| Western Oregon | 5 | – | 4 | 6 | – | 5 |
| UT Permian Basin | 4 | – | 5 | 5 | – | 6 |
| West Texas A&M | 3 | – | 6 | 5 | – | 6 |
| Eastern New Mexico | 2 | – | 7 | 3 | – | 8 |
| Simon Fraser | 1 | – | 8 | 1 | – | 9 |
$ – Conference champion; ^ – NCAA Division II playoff participant; # – Heritage Bowl participant; Rankings from AFCA poll

The 2022 Angelo State Rams football team represented Angelo State University as a member of the Lone Star Conference during the 2022 NCAA Division II football season. Led by fifth-year head coach Jeff Girsch, the Rams compiled an overall record of 12–1 with a mark of 9–0 in conference play, winning the LSC title. Angelo State received a first-round bye in the NCAA Division II Football Championship playoffs and beat Bemidji State in the second round before losing to Colorado Mines in the quarterfinals. Angelo State played home games at the LeGrand Sports Complex in San Angelo, Texas.

== Preseason ==
=== LSC media poll ===
The LSC media poll was released on July 26, 2022. The Rams were predicted to finish first in the conference.

== Schedule ==
| Date | Time | Opponent | Rank | Site | Result | Attendance |
|---|---|---|---|---|---|---|
| September 1 | 7:00 p.m. | Chadron State* | No. 7 | LeGrand Sports Complex; San Angelo, TX | W 35–0 | 2,676 |
| September 10 | 1:00 p.m. | at No. 12 Colorado Mines* | No. 6 | Alumni Field; Golden, CO | W 30–27 ^{OT} | 1,863 |
| September 17 | 6:00 p.m. | at UT Permian Basin | No. 5 | Astound Broadband Stadium; Midland, TX | W 34–21 | 3,287 |
| September 24 | 6:00 p.m. | West Texas A&M | No. 4 | LeGrand Sports Complex; San Angelo, TX | W 34–14 | 4,283 |
| October 1 | 1:00 p.m. | at Western Oregon | No. 3 | McArthur Field; Monmouth, OR | W 30–7 | 774 |
| October 8 | 6:00 p.m. | Eastern New Mexico | No. 3 | LeGrand Sports Complex; San Angelo, TX | W 28–9 | 3,637 |
| October 15 | 12:00 p.m. | at Western New Mexico | No. 3 | Altamirano Stadium; Silver City, NM | W 52–13 | 225 |
| October 22 | 6:00 p.m. | No. 15 Texas A&M–Kingsville | No. 2 | LeGrand Sports Complex; San Angelo, TX | W 34–7 | 5,246 |
| October 29 | 9:00 p.m. | at Simon Fraser | No. 2 | Borderite Stadium; Blaine, WA | W 24–0 | 400 |
| November 5 | 6:00 p.m. | Central Washington | No. 2 | LeGrand Sports Complex; San Angelo, TX | W 22–12 | 4,719 |
| November 12 | 1:00 p.m. | at Midwestern State | No. 2 | Memorial Stadium; Wichita Falls, TX | W 37–19 | 6,167 |
| November 26 | 1:00 p.m. | Bemidji State* | No. 2 | LeGrand Sports Complex; San Angelo, TX (NCAA Division II Second Round) | W 33–7 | 3,956 |
| December 3 | 1:00 p.m. | No. 11 Colorado Mines* | No. 2 | LeGrand Sports Complex; San Angelo, TX (NCAA Division II Quarterfinal) | L 24–42 | 4,872 |
*Non-conference game; Rankings from AFCA Poll released prior to the game; All times are in Central time

== Rankings ==
Ranking movements Legend: ██ Increase in ranking ██ Decrease in ranking ( ) = First-place votes
| | Week | | | | | | | | | | | | |
| Poll | Pre | 1 | 2 | 3 | 4 | 5 | 6 | 7 | 8 | 9 | 10 | 11 | Final |
|---|---|---|---|---|---|---|---|---|---|---|---|---|---|
| AFCA | 7 | 6 | 5 | 4 | 3 | 3 | 3 | 2 (1) | 2 (2) | 2 (2) | 2 (2) | 2 (3) | 7 |

== Coaching staff ==
Angelo State Rams
| Name | Position | Consecutive season at Angelo State in current position | Previous position | ASU profile |
| Jeff Girsch | Head coach | 4th | Angelo State – Defensive coordinator (2015–2018) | |
| Kevin Kilmer | Offensive coordinator / quarterbacks | 4th | Bowling Green – Co-offensive coordinator / wide receivers (2016–2018) | |
| Adam Clark | Defensive coordinator | 5th | Tarleton State – Special teams coordinator / defensive line (2017) | |
| Jason Johnson | Wide receivers | 7th | Texas State – Wide receivers (2011–2015) | |
| Devante Sims | Defensive backs | 2nd | Eastern New Mexico – Defensive backs (2019–2020) | |
| Madison Atwell | Offensive line | 2nd | Snow – Offensive line (2020) | |
| Tyler O'Bryan | Linebackers | 1st | Angelo State – Graduate assistant (2017–2021) | |

== Game summaries ==
=== Chadron State ===
Chadron State Ealges at No. 7 Angelo State Rams – Game summary

| Quarter | 1 | 2 | 3 | 4 | Total |
|---|---|---|---|---|---|
| Eagles | 0 | 0 | 0 | 0 | 0 |
| No. 7 Rams | 14 | 7 | 0 | 14 | 35 |

at LeGrand Sports Complex, San Angelo, Texas

- Date: September 1
- Game time: 7:00 p.m. CDT
- Game weather: Cloudy
- Game attendance: 2,676
- Referee: Joe Greer
- Box score, Recap

Game information
First quarter
- ASU – Nathaniel Omayebu III 6-yard run (Asa Fuller kick), 4:07. Rams 7–0. Drive: 9 plays, 65 yards, 3:33.
- ASU – Noah Massey 23-yard pass from Zach Bronkhorst (Asa Fuller kick), 0:30. Rams 14–0. Drive: 4 plays, 62 yards, 1:33.

Second quarter

- ASU – Thomas Aych 7-yard pass from Zach Bronkhorst (Asa Fuller kick), 7:53. Rams 21–0. Drive: 7 plays, 79 yards, 2:46.

Third quarter

- No scoring plays

Fourth quarter

- ASU – Zach Bronkhorst 10-yard run (Asa Fuller kick), 10:38. Rams 28–0. Drive: 1 play, 10 yards, 0:05.
- ASU – Jordan McKinney 41-yard interception return (Asa Fuller kick), 4:29. Rams 35–0.

| Statistics | CSC | ASU |
|---|---|---|
| First downs | 13 | 26 |
| Total yards | 224 | 424 |
| Rushing yards | 164 | 191 |
| Passing yards | 60 | 233 |
| Turnovers | 2 | 0 |
| Time of possession | 27:11 | 32:49 |

| Team | Category | Player | Statistics |
|---|---|---|---|
| Chadron State | Passing | Heath Beemiller | 6/25, 60 yards, 2 INT |
| Chadron State | Rushing | Heath Beemiller | 18 rushes, 90 yards |
| Chadron State | Receiving | Peter Krohn | 1 reception, 26 yards |
| Angelo State | Passing | Zach Bronkhorst | 18/34, 233 yards, 2 TD |
| Angelo State | Rushing | Alfred Grear | 13 rushes, 111 yards |
| Angelo State | Receiving | Noah Massey | 5 receptions, 75 yards, TD |

=== At No. 12 Colorado Mines ===
No. 6 Angelo State Rams at No. 12 Colorado Mines Orediggers – Game summary

| Quarter | 1 | 2 | 3 | 4 | OT | Total |
|---|---|---|---|---|---|---|
| No. 6 Rams | 3 | 7 | 7 | 10 | 3 | 30 |
| No. 12 Orediggers | 0 | 10 | 14 | 3 | 0 | 27 |

at Alumni Field, Golden, Colorado

- Date: September 10
- Game time: 1:00 p.m. CDT/12:00 p.m. MDT
- Game weather: Sunny
- Game attendance: 1,863
- Box score, Recap

Game information
First quarter
- ASU – Asa Fuller 35-yard field goal, 3:54. Rams 3–0. Drive: 5 plays, 19 yards, 1:15.

Second quarter

- CSM – Matthew Eich 43-yard field goal, 11:45. Tied 3–3. Drive: 9 plays, 33 yards, 4:12.
- CSM – Michael Zeman 2-yard run (Matthew Eich kick), 5:59. Orediggers 10–3. Drive: 8 plays, 59 yards, 2:58.
- ASU – Alfred Grear 60-yard run (Asa Fuller kick), 5:10. Tied 10–10. Drive: 2 plays, 65 yards, 0:49.

Third quarter

- ASU – Kason Phillips 46-yard run (Asa Fuller kick), 12:30. Rams 17–10. Drive: 4 plays, 60 yards, 1:41.
- CSM – Mason Karp 30-yard pass from John Matocha (Matthew Eich kick), 8:03. Tied 17–17. Drive: 10 plays, 75 yards, 4:27.
- CSM – Mason Pierce 27-yard interception return (Matthew Eich kick), 2:59. Orediggers 24–17.

Fourth quarter

- ASU – Asa Fuller 41-yard field goal, 13:23. Orediggers 24–20. Drive: 11 plays, 52 yards, 1:37.
- CSM – Matthew Eich 41-yard field goal, 6:32. Orediggers 27–20. Drive: 12 plays, 51 yards, 6:51.
- ASU – Nate Omayebu III 37-yard run (Asa Fuller kick), 1:55. Tied 27–27. Drive: 3 plays, 67 yards, 1:02.

Overtime

- ASU – Asa Fuller 36-yard field goal. Rams 30–27. Drive: 4 plays, 6 yards.

| Statistics | ASU | CSM |
|---|---|---|
| First downs | 23 | 16 |
| Total yards | 437 | 273 |
| Rushing yards | 264 | 106 |
| Passing yards | 173 | 167 |
| Turnovers | 2 | 0 |
| Time of possession | 27:25 | 32:35 |

| Team | Category | Player | Statistics |
|---|---|---|---|
| Angelo State | Passing | Zach Bronkhorst | 17/34, 173 yards, 2 INT |
| Angelo State | Rushing | Nate Omayebu III | 21 rushes, 89 yards, TD |
| Angelo State | Receiving | Kyle Bradford | 3 receptions, 52 yards |
| Colorado Mines | Passing | John Matocha | 13/26, 167 yards, TD |
| Colorado Mines | Rushing | Michael Zerman | 25 rushes, 77 yards, TD |
| Colorado Mines | Receiving | Josh Johnston | 4 receptions, 65 yards |

=== At UT Permian Basin ===
No. 5 Angelo State Rams at UT Permian Basin Falcons – Game summary

| Quarter | 1 | 2 | 3 | 4 | Total |
|---|---|---|---|---|---|
| No. 5 Rams | 14 | 10 | 0 | 10 | 34 |
| Falcons | 0 | 7 | 14 | 0 | 21 |

at Astound Broadband Stadium, Midland, Texas

- Date: September 17
- Game time: 6:00 p.m. CDT
- Game weather: Sunny, 90 °F (32 °C)
- Game attendance: 3,287
- Referee: Tony Acosta
- Box score, Recap

Game information
First quarter
- ASU – Andrew Pitts 41-yard interception return (Asa Fuller kick), 6:19. Rams 7–0.
- ASU – Nate Omayebu III 1-yard run (Asa Fuller kick), 2:26. Rams 14–0. Drive: 7 plays, 64 yards, 2:38.

Second quarter

- ASU – Asa Fuller 21-yard field goal, 14:05. Rams 17–0. Drive: 6 plays, 34 yards, 1:41.
- ASU – Nate Omayebu III 12-yard pass from Zach Bronkhorst (Asa Fuller kick), 10:54. Rams 24–0. Drive: 6 plays, 36 yards, 2:15.
- TPB – Suddin Sapien 1-yard run (Carson Roberts kick), 7:49. Rams 24–7. Drive: 7 plays, 62 yards, 2:58.

Third quarter

- TPB – MJ Link 76-yard pass from Jordan Barton (Carson Roberts kick), 5:06. Rams 24–14. Drive: 3 plays, 82 yards, 0:45.
- TPB – MJ Link 70-yard pass from Jordan Barton (Carson Roberts kick), 1:40. Rams 24–21. Drive: 2 plays, 87 yards, 0:33.

Fourth quarter

- ASU – Asa Fuller 46-yard field goal, 8:33. Rams 27–21. Drive: 10 plays, 40 yards, 5:11.
- ASU – Drew Carstens 5-yard pass from Zach Bronkhorst (Asa Fuller kick), 4:03. Rams 34–21. Drive: 6 plays, 50 yards, 3:30.

| Statistics | ASU | TPB |
|---|---|---|
| First downs | 25 | 13 |
| Total yards | 436 | 258 |
| Rushing yards | 111 | 12 |
| Passing yards | 325 | 246 |
| Turnovers | 1 | 3 |
| Time of possession | 37:59 | 22:01 |

| Team | Category | Player | Statistics |
|---|---|---|---|
| Angelo State | Passing | Zach Bronkhorst | 22/42, 325 yards, 2 TD |
| Angelo State | Rushing | Nate Omayebu III | 26 rushes, 130 yards, TD |
| Angelo State | Receiving | Kyle Bradford | 4 receptions, 78 yards |
| UT Permian Basin | Passing | Jordan Barton | 10/19, 246 yards, 2 TD, 3 INT |
| UT Permian Basin | Rushing | Kory Harris | 17 rushes, 47 yards |
| UT Permian Basin | Receiving | MJ Link | 5 receptions, 191 yards, 2 TD |

=== West Texas A&M ===
West Texas A&M Buffaloes at No. 4 Angelo State Rams – Game summary

| Quarter | 1 | 2 | 3 | 4 | Total |
|---|---|---|---|---|---|
| Buffaloes | 0 | 7 | 0 | 7 | 14 |
| No. 4 Rams | 6 | 0 | 14 | 14 | 34 |

at LeGrand Sports Complex, San Angelo, Texas

- Date: September 24
- Game time: 6:00 p.m. CDT
- Game weather: Sunny
- Game attendance: 4,283
- Referee: Wayne Elliot
- Box score, Recap

Game information
First quarter
- ASU – Asa Fuller 21-yard field goal, 5:15. Rams 3–0. Drive: 10 plays, 74 yards, 4:24.
- ASU – Asa Fuller 29-yard field goal, 0:30. Rams 6–0. Drive: 4 plays, 3 yards, 0:55.

Second quarter

- WT – Nick Gerber 25-yard run (Gage Urias kick), 8:22. Buffaloes 7–6. Drive: 9 plays, 53 yards, 4:17.

Third quarter

- ASU – Kyle Bradford 7-yard pass from Zach Bronkhorst (Asa Fuller kick), 10:57. Rams 13–7. Drive: 9 plays, 65 yards, 4:03.
- ASU – Nate Omayebu III 2-yard run (Asa Fuller kick), 1:34. Rams 20–7. Drive: 6 plays, 59 yards, 2:59.

Fourth quarter

- WT – Shakell Brown 2-yard run (Gage Urias kick), 12:02. Rams 20–14. Drive: 12 plays, 75 yards, 4:32.
- ASU – Kason Philips 24-yard run (Asa Fuller kick), 6:47. Rams 27–14. Drive: 10 plays, 78 yards, 5:10.
- ASU – Andrew Pitts 89-yard interception return (Asa Fuller kick), 1:48. Rams 34–17.

| Statistics | WT | ASU |
|---|---|---|
| First downs | 20 | 23 |
| Total yards | 356 | 455 |
| Rushing yards | 117 | 176 |
| Passing yards | 239 | 279 |
| Turnovers | 2 | 2 |
| Time of possession | 30:00 | 30:00 |

| Team | Category | Player | Statistics |
|---|---|---|---|
| West Texas A&M | Passing | Nick Gerber | 14/24, 189 yards |
| West Texas A&M | Rushing | Jarrod Compton | 15 rushes, 61 yards |
| West Texas A&M | Receiving | Noah Bogardus | 3 receptions, 71 yards |
| Angelo State | Passing | Zach Bronkhorst | 27/39, 279 yards, TD, INT |
| Angelo State | Rushing | Nate Omayebu III | 19 rushes, 97 yards, TD |
| Angelo State | Receiving | Rasheen Green | 5 receptions, 67 yards |

=== At Western Oregon ===
No. 3 Angelo State Rams at Western Oregon Wolves – Game summary

| Quarter | 1 | 2 | 3 | 4 | Total |
|---|---|---|---|---|---|
| No. 3 Rams | 7 | 13 | 7 | 3 | 30 |
| Wolves | 0 | 7 | 0 | 0 | 7 |

at McArthur Field, Monmouth, Oregon

- Date: October 1
- Game time: 1:00 p.m. CDT/11:00 a.m. PDT
- Game weather: Sunny, 80 °F (27 °C)
- Game attendance: 774
- Referee: Cameron McNie
- Box score, Recap

Game information
First quarter
- ASU – Nate Omayebu III 10-yard run (Asa Fuller kick), 8:53. Rams 7–0. Drive: 3 plays, 53 yards, 1:19.

Second quarter

- ASU – Kason Philips 2-yard pass from Zach Bronkhorst (kick blocked), 14:55. Rams 13–0. Drive: 3 plays, 75 yards, 1:07.
- WOU – Omari Land 19-yard run (Daniel Cossette kick), 12:31. Rams 13–7. Drive: 5 plays, 37 yards, 2:15.
- ASU – Nate Omayebu III 2-yard run (Asa Fuller kick), 3:33. Rams 20–7. Drive: 7 plays, 47 yards, 3:55.

Third quarter

- ASU – Kason Philips 82-yard pass from Zach Bronkhorst (Asa Fuller kick), 4:24. Rams 27–7. Drive: 1 play, 82 yards, 0:12.

Fourth quarter

- ASU – Asa Fuller 21-yard field goal, 5:36. Rams 30–7. Drive: 6 plays, 24 yards, 3:16.

| Statistics | ASU | WOU |
|---|---|---|
| First downs | 16 | 10 |
| Total yards | 437 | 180 |
| Rushing yards | 161 | 53 |
| Passing yards | 276 | 127 |
| Turnovers | 1 | 3 |
| Time of possession | 28:32 | 31:28 |

| Team | Category | Player | Statistics |
|---|---|---|---|
| Angelo State | Passing | Zach Bronkhorst | 14/24, 276 yards, 2 TD, INT |
| Angelo State | Rushing | Nate Omayebu III | 19 rushes, 83 yards, 2 TD |
| Angelo State | Receiving | Noah Massey | 3 receptions, 87 yards |
| Western Oregon | Passing | Gannon Winker | 14/23, 127 yards, 3 INT |
| Western Oregon | Rushing | Omari Land | 21 rushes, 94 yards, TD |
| Western Oregon | Receiving | Marquis Sampson | 6 receptions, 62 yards |

=== Eastern New Mexico ===
Eastern New Mexico Greyhounds at No. 3 Angelo State Rams – Game summary

| Quarter | 1 | 2 | 3 | 4 | Total |
|---|---|---|---|---|---|
| Greyhounds | 6 | 3 | 0 | 0 | 9 |
| No. 3 Rams | 21 | 0 | 7 | 0 | 28 |

at LeGrand Sports Complex, San Angelo, Texas

- Date: October 8
- Game time: 6:00 p.m. CDT
- Game weather: Sunny
- Game attendance: 3,637
- Referee: Andy Dunklin
- Box score, Recap

Game information
First quarter
- ENM – Caden Ochoa 35-yard interception return (kick failed), 14:31. Greyhounds 6–0.
- ASU – Noah Massey 14-yard pass from Zach Bronkhorst (Asa Fuller kick), 8:27. Rams 7–6. Drive: 8 plays, 77 yards, 3:03.
- ASU – Rasheen Green 41-yard pass from Zach Bronkhorst (Asa Fuller kick), 5:52. Rams 14–6. Drive: 5 plays, 70 yards, 1:39.
- ASU – Kel Williams 19-yard pass from Zach Bronkhorst (Asa Fuller kick), 0:39. Rams 21–6. Drive: 7 plays, 70 yards, 3:00.

Second quarter

- ENM – Cooper Hamilton 23-yard field goal, 0:21. Rams 21–9. Drive: 10 plays, 71 yards, 3:52.

Third quarter

- ASU – Matthew Carter 11-yard pass from Zach Bronkhorst (Asa Fuller kick), 2:47. Rams 28–9. Drive: 8 plays, 57 yards, 4:23.

Fourth quarter

- No scoring plays

| Statistics | ENM | ASU |
|---|---|---|
| First downs | 10 | 21 |
| Total yards | 207 | 417 |
| Rushing yards | 125 | 169 |
| Passing yards | 82 | 248 |
| Turnovers | 3 | 1 |
| Time of possession | 32:08 | 27:52 |

| Team | Category | Player | Statistics |
|---|---|---|---|
| Eastern New Mexico | Passing | Mario Sanchez | 7/15, 82 yards, INT |
| Eastern New Mexico | Rushing | Isaiah Tate | 27 rushes, 103 yards |
| Eastern New Mexico | Receiving | Asa Wondeh | 3 receptions, 58 yards |
| Angelo State | Passing | Zach Bronkhorst | 14/31, 248 yards, 4 TD, INT |
| Angelo State | Rushing | Kason Philips | 11 rushes, 69 yards |
| Angelo State | Receiving | Noah Massey | 4 receptions, 52 yards, TD |

=== At Western New Mexico ===
No. 3 Angelo State Rams at Western New Mexico Mustangs – Game summary

| Quarter | 1 | 2 | 3 | 4 | Total |
|---|---|---|---|---|---|
| No. 3 Rams | 10 | 28 | 7 | 7 | 52 |
| Mustangs | 6 | 0 | 0 | 7 | 13 |

at Altamirano Stadium, Silver City, New Mexico

- Date: October 15
- Game time: 12:00 p.m. CDT/11:00 a.m. MDT
- Game weather: Sunny, 63 °F (17 °C)
- Game attendance: 225
- Referee: Dwayne Finley
- Box score, Recap

| Statistics | ASU | WNM |
|---|---|---|
| First downs | | |
| Total yards | | |
| Rushing yards | | |
| Passing yards | | |
| Turnovers | | |
| Time of possession | | |

| Team | Category | Player | Statistics |
|---|---|---|---|
| Angelo State | Passing | | |
| Angelo State | Rushing | | |
| Angelo State | Receiving | | |
| Western New Mexico | Passing | | |
| Western New Mexico | Rushing | | |
| Western New Mexico | Receiving | | |

=== No. 15 Texas A&M–Kingsville ===
No. 15 Texas A&M–Kingsville Javelinas at No. 2 Angelo State Rams – Game summary

| Quarter | 1 | 2 | 3 | 4 | Total |
|---|---|---|---|---|---|
| No. 15 Javelinas | 7 | 0 | 0 | 0 | 7 |
| No. 2 Rams | 7 | 13 | 7 | 7 | 34 |

at LeGrand Sports Complex, San Angelo, Texas

- Date: October 22
- Game time: 6:00 p.m. CDT
- Game weather: Sunny
- Game attendance: 5,246
- Referee: Kenny Moore
- Box score, Recap

| Statistics | TAK | ASU |
|---|---|---|
| First downs | | |
| Total yards | | |
| Rushing yards | | |
| Passing yards | | |
| Turnovers | | |
| Time of possession | | |

| Team | Category | Player | Statistics |
|---|---|---|---|
| Texas A&M–Kingsville | Passing | | |
| Texas A&M–Kingsville | Rushing | | |
| Texas A&M–Kingsville | Receiving | | |
| Angelo State | Passing | | |
| Angelo State | Rushing | | |
| Angelo State | Receiving | | |

=== At Simon Fraser ===
No. 2 Angelo State Rams at Simon Fraser Red Leafs – Game summary

| Quarter | 1 | 2 | 3 | 4 | Total |
|---|---|---|---|---|---|
| No. 2 Rams | 14 | 3 | 7 | 0 | 24 |
| Red Leafs | 0 | 0 | 0 | 0 | 0 |

at Borderite Stadium, Blaine, Washington

- Date: October 29
- Game time: 9:00 p.m. CDT/7:00 p.m. PDT
- Game weather: Cold and cloudy, 12 °C (54 °F)
- Game attendance: 400
- Referee: Tim Gloudeman
- Box score, Recap

Game information
First quarter
- ASU – Cade Fuller 9-yard run (Asa Fuller kick), 10:32. Rams 7–0. Drive: 11 plays, 75 yards, 4:19.
- ASU – Kason Philips 4-yard run (Asa Fuller kick), 4:28. Rams 14–0. Drive: 11 plays, 61 yards, 5:03.

Second quarter

- ASU – Asa Fuller 21-yard field goal, 9:25. Rams 17–0. Drive: 12 plays, 60 yards, 4:44.

Third quarter

- ASU – Kason Philips 6-yard run (Asa Fuller kick), 6:42. Rams 24–0. Drive: 5 plays, 52 yards, 2:18.

Fourth quarter

- No scoring plays

| Statistics | ASU | SFU |
|---|---|---|
| First downs | 28 | 4 |
| Total yards | 428 | 55 |
| Rushing yards | 238 | 16 |
| Passing yards | 190 | 39 |
| Turnovers | 0 | 0 |
| Time of possession | 40:12 | 19:48 |

| Team | Category | Player | Statistics |
|---|---|---|---|
| Angelo State | Passing | Zack Bronkhorst | 18/30, 190 yards |
| Angelo State | Rushing | Kason Philips | 23 rushes, 111 yards, 2 TD |
| Angelo State | Receiving | Kason Philips | 4 receptions, 44 yards |
| Simon Fraser | Passing | Justin Seiber | 7/20, 39 yards |
| Simon Fraser | Rushing | Somto Anyadike | 10 rushes, 19 yards |
| Simon Fraser | Receiving | Aidan Pearce | 3 receptions, 17 yards |

=== Central Washington ===
Central Washington Wildcats at No. 2 Angelo State Rams – Game summary

| Quarter | 1 | 2 | 3 | 4 | Total |
|---|---|---|---|---|---|
| Wildcats | 9 | 0 | 3 | 0 | 12 |
| No. 2 Rams | 0 | 0 | 15 | 7 | 22 |

at LeGrand Sports Complex, San Angelo, Texas

- Date: November 5
- Game time: 6:00 p.m. CDT
- Game weather: Sunny, 73 °F (23 °C)
- Game attendance: 4,719
- Referee: Brad Frisby
- Box score, Recap

| Statistics | CWU | ASU |
|---|---|---|
| First downs | | |
| Total yards | | |
| Rushing yards | | |
| Passing yards | | |
| Turnovers | | |
| Time of possession | | |

| Team | Category | Player | Statistics |
|---|---|---|---|
| Central Washington | Passing | | |
| Central Washington | Rushing | | |
| Central Washington | Receiving | | |
| Angelo State | Passing | | |
| Angelo State | Rushing | | |
| Angelo State | Receiving | | |

=== At Midwestern State ===
No. 2 Angelo State Rams at Midwestern State Mustangs – Game summary

| Quarter | 1 | 2 | 3 | 4 | Total |
|---|---|---|---|---|---|
| No. 2 Rams | 14 | 3 | 14 | 6 | 37 |
| Mustangs | 3 | 3 | 0 | 13 | 19 |

at Memorial Stadium, Wichita Falls, Texas

- Date: November 12
- Game time: 1:00 p.m. CST
- Game weather: Sunny, 42 °F (6 °C)
- Game attendance: 6,167
- Referee: Randy Adams
- Box score, Recap

| Statistics | ASU | MSU |
|---|---|---|
| First downs | | |
| Total yards | | |
| Rushing yards | | |
| Passing yards | | |
| Turnovers | | |
| Time of possession | | |

| Team | Category | Player | Statistics |
|---|---|---|---|
| Angelo State | Passing | | |
| Angelo State | Rushing | | |
| Angelo State | Receiving | | |
| Midwestern State | Passing | | |
| Midwestern State | Rushing | | |
| Midwestern State | Receiving | | |

=== Bemidji State (NCAA Division II Second Round) ===
NCAA Division II Second Round
Bemidji State Beavers at No. 2 Angelo State Rams – Game summary

| Quarter | 1 | 2 | 3 | 4 | Total |
|---|---|---|---|---|---|
| Beavers | 7 | 0 | 0 | 0 | 7 |
| No. 2 Rams | 0 | 13 | 0 | 20 | 33 |

at LeGrand Sports Complex, San Angelo, Texas

- Date: November 26
- Game time: 1:00 p.m. CST
- Game weather: Cloudy, 47 °F (8 °C)
- Game attendance: 3,956
- Referee: Cecil Harrison
- Box score, Recap

Game information
First quarter
- BSU – Brendan Beaulieu 4-yard pass from Brandon Alt (Connor Cusick kick), 7:28. Beavers 7–0. Drive: 2 plays, 8 yards, 0:41.

Second quarter

- ASU – Nate Omayebu III 19-yard pass from Zach Bronkhorst (Asa Fuller kick), 10:36. Tied 7–7. Drive: 6 plays, 48 yards, 3:14.
- ASU – Nate Omayebu III 12-yard pass from Zach Bronkhorst (kick failed), 0:22. Rams 13–7. Drive: 8 plays, 92 yards, 2:51.

Third quarter

- No scoring plays

Fourth quarter

- ASU – Asa Fuller 47-yard field goal, 9:56. Rams 16–7. Drive: 9 plays, 38 yards, 3:46.
- ASU – Brayden Wilcox 7-yard run (Asa Fuller kick), 5:20. Rams 23–7. Drive: 7 plays, 90 yards, 3:41.
- ASU – Asa Fuller 26-yard field goal, 3:15. Rams 26–7. Drive: 4 plays, 0 yards, 1:00.
- ASU – Kason McCullough-Cooper 28-yard interception return (Asa Fuller kick), 3:07. Rams 33–7.

| Statistics | BSU | ASU |
|---|---|---|
| First downs | 8 | 25 |
| Total yards | 188 | 486 |
| Rushing yards | 10 | 149 |
| Passing yards | 178 | 337 |
| Turnovers | 5 | 1 |
| Time of possession | 20:05 | 39:55 |

| Team | Category | Player | Statistics |
|---|---|---|---|
| Bemidji State | Passing | Brandon Alt | 16/36, 178 yards, TD, 5 INT |
| Bemidji State | Rushing | Sage Booker | 5 rushes, 11 yards |
| Bemidji State | Receiving | Dhel Duncan-Busby | 5 receptions, 74 yards |
| Angelo State | Passing | Zach Bronkhorst | 21/41, 337 yards, 2 TD |
| Angelo State | Rushing | Nate Omayebu III | 24 rushes, 91 yards |
| Angelo State | Receiving | Noah Massey | 7 receptions, 96 yards |

=== No. 11 Colorado Mines (NCAA Division II Quarterfinal) ===
NCAA Division II Quarterfinal
No. 11 Colorado Mines at No. 2 Angelo State Rams – Game summary

| Quarter | 1 | 2 | 3 | 4 | Total |
|---|---|---|---|---|---|
| No. 11 Orediggers | 14 | 7 | 14 | 7 | 42 |
| No. 2 Rams | 7 | 3 | 14 | 0 | 24 |

at LeGrand Sports Complex, San Angelo, Texas

- Date: December 3
- Game time: 1:00 p.m. CST
- Game weather: Sunny
- Game attendance: 4,872
- Referee: Dwight Neibling
- Box score, Recap

Game information
First quarter
- CSM – Micheal Zerman 9-yard pass from John Matocha (Jacob Click kick), 12:27. Orediggers 7–0. Drive: 3 plays, 14 yards, 0:41.
- ASU – Nate Omayebu III 2-yard pass from Zach Bronkhorst (Asa Fuller kick), 4:20. Tied 7–7. Drive: 12 plays, 85 yards, 5:08.
- CSM – Tristan Smith 10-yard pass from John Matocha (Jacob Click kick), 0:25. Orediggers 14–7. Drive: 8 plays, 83 yards, 3:54.

Second quarter

- CSM – Tristan Smith 28-yard pass from John Matocha (Jacob Click kick), 4:33. Orediggers 21–7. Drive: 4 plays, 38 yards, 1:58.
- ASU – Asa Fuller 30-yard field goal, 0:00. Orediggers 21–10. Drive: 6 plays, 45 yards, 0:57.

Third quarter

- ASU – Noah Massey 28-yard pass from Zach Bronkhorst (Asa Fuller kick), 10:23. Orediggers 21–17. Drive: 6 plays, 65 yards, 2:34.
- CSM – John Matocha 53-yard run (Jacob Click kick), 8:17. Orediggers 28–17. Drive: 6 plays, 75 yards, 2:06.
- ASU – Kyle Bradford 31-yard pass from Zach Bronkhorst (Asa Fuller kick), 5:08. Orediggers 28–24. Drive: 8 plays, 75 yards, 3:09.
- CSM – Tristan Smith 6-yard pass from John Matocha (Jacob Click kick), 1:49. Orediggers 35–24. Drive: 3 plays, 12 yards, 1:16.

Fourth quarter

- CSM – John Matocha 10-yard run (Jacob Click kick), 2:34. Orediggers 42–24. Drive: 9 plays, 39 yards, 4:47.

| Statistics | CSM | ASU |
|---|---|---|
| First downs | 18 | 20 |
| Total yards | 322 | 396 |
| Rushing yards | 161 | 323 |
| Passing yards | 161 | 73 |
| Turnovers | 0 | 3 |
| Time of possession | 30:15 | 29:45 |

| Team | Category | Player | Statistics |
|---|---|---|---|
| Colorado Mines | Passing | John Matocha | 16/28, 161 yards, 4 TD |
| Colorado Mines | Rushing | John Matocha | 16 rushes, 102 yards, 2 TD |
| Colorado Mines | Receiving | Tristan Smith | 6 receptions, 54 yards, 3 TD |
| Angelo State | Passing | Zach Bronkhorst | 28/50, 323 yards, 3 TD |
| Angelo State | Rushing | Nate Omayebu III | 15 rushes, 76 yards |
| Angelo State | Receiving | Zorhan Rideaux | 7 receptions, 107 yards |
