= 2022 UT Permian Basin Falcons football team =

American college football season

2022 UT Permian Basin Falcons football
- Conference: Lone Star Conference
- Record: 5–6 (4–5 LSC)
- Head coach: Justin Carrigan (7th season)
- Offensive coordinator: Rob Messinger (1st season)
- Offensive scheme: Spread
- Co-defensive coordinators: Chris Mineo (7th season); Jacob Martin (7th season)
- Base defense: 3–4
- Home stadium: Astound Broadband Stadium; Ratliff Stadium

2022 Lone Star Conference football standings
	Conf.			Overall
Team	W		L	W		L
No. 7 Angelo State $^	9	–	0	12	–	1
Central Washington	6	–	3	6	–	4
Texas A&M–Kingsville #	5	–	4	7	–	5
Midwestern State	5	–	4	6	–	5
Western New Mexico	5	–	4	6	–	5
Western Oregon	5	–	4	6	–	5
UT Permian Basin	4	–	5	5	–	6
West Texas A&M	3	–	6	5	–	6
Eastern New Mexico	2	–	7	3	–	8
Simon Fraser	1	–	8	1	–	9
$ – Conference champion; ^ – NCAA Division II playoff participant; # – Heritage Bowl participant; Rankings from AFCA Poll

The 2022 UT Permian Basin Falcons football team represented the University of Texas Permian Basin (UTPB) in the 2022 NCAA Division II football season as a member of the Lone Star Conference (LSC). The team played its home games at Astound Broadband Stadium in Midland, Texas while Ratliff Stadium in Odessa hosted two home games. The Falcons were led by seventh-year head coach Justin Carrigan. On November 28, Carrigan announced that he would be stepping down as the program's head coach. The following day it was announced he would be stepping into an administrative role, being named the university's deputy athletic director.

The 2022 season marked the first season in program history where the program was fully funded with 36 scholarships. The Falcons previously only had 12 scholarships available per season from 2016 to 2021.

== Preseason ==
=== LSC media poll ===
In the LSC's preseason poll, the Falcons were predicted to finish fifth in the conference, and they also received two first-place votes.

== Schedule ==
The Falcons' 2022 schedule consisted of six home games and five away games. The team hosted LSC foes Angelo State, Simon Fraser, Midwestern State, and Western New Mexico and traveled to Western Oregon, West Texas A&M, Texas A&M–Kingsville, Eastern New Mexico, and Central Washington.

The Falcons hosted non-conference foes Southwest Baptist from the Great Lakes Valley Conference and Western Colorado from the Rocky Mountain Athletic Conference.

Date	Time	Opponent	Site	Result	Attendance
September 3	6:00 p.m.	Southwest Baptist*	Astound Broadband Stadium; Midland, TX	L 17–41	4,561
September 10	6:00 p.m.	Western Colorado*	Astound Broadband Stadium; Midland, TX	W 34–31 ^{2OT}	3,278
September 17	6:00 p.m.	No. 5 Angelo State	Astound Broadband Stadium; Midland, TX	L 21–34	3,287
September 24	4:30 p.m.	at Western Oregon	McArthur Field; Monmouth, OR	W 27–24	1,189
October 1	7:00 p.m.	at West Texas A&M	Buffalo Stadium; Canyon, TX	L 27–28	9,414
October 8	6:00 p.m.	Simon Fraser^{†}	Ratliff Stadium; Odessa, TX	W 31–24 ^{OT}	3,742
October 15	7:00 p.m.	at No. 20 Texas A&M–Kingsville	Javelina Stadium; Kingsville, TX	L 10–13	9,136
October 22	6:00 p.m.	Midwestern State	Astound Broadband Stadium; Midland, TX	L 23–24	3,561
October 29	2:00 p.m.	at Eastern New Mexico	Greyhound Stadium; Portales, NM	W 24–21	1,422
November 5	6:00 p.m.	Western New Mexico	Ratliff Stadium; Odessa, TX	W 37–14	3,268
November 12	1:00 p.m.	at Central Washington	Tomlinson Stadium; Ellensburg, WA	L 14–49	4,872
*Non-conference game; ^{†}Homecoming; Rankings from AFCA Poll released prior to the game; All times are in Central time

Schedule source:

== Roster ==
2022 UT Permian Basin Falcons football team roster
Players
Coaches
Offense

Pos.	#	Name	Class
WR	2	Marcus Molina	So
QB	3	Dylan Graham	So
WR	5	MJ Link	Sr
WR	6	Malik Jackson	So
WR	9	Timothy Wiggins	Jr
WR	11	Clyde Bellow	So
QB	12	Suddin Sapien	So
WR	13	Gunnar Abseck	So
RB	15	Taj Crenshaw	So
WR	16	Ethan Leyva	So
QB	17	Jordan Barton	So
QB	18	Gabe Herrera	Fr
RB	25	Caden Cox	Jr
RB	26	Kory Harris	Fr
RB	27	Kenneth Walker	Fr
RB	33	Nathan Tilford	Sr
TE	45	Matt Zubiate	Sr
RB	47	Jacob Olivares	Fr
RB	48	Antonio Malone	Fr
TE	50	Rylan Meek	So
OL	51	Heston Edwards	Fr
OL	55	Austin LaFavers	So
OL	59	TK Mina	Fr
OL	60	Derrick Assad	Jr
OL	61	Noah Issa	So
OL	62	Sebastian Martinez	Fr
OL	65	Dawson Reynolds	So
OL	67	Pesi Savea	Sr
OL	68	Malik Davis	So
OL	69	Logan Davis	Fr
OL	70	Mason Schweinle	Fr
OL	71	Joseph Mueller	Fr
OL	72	Juwan Callines	Jr
OL	75	Ovidio Melendez	Sr
OL	76	Xavier Orta	So
OL	77	Ramon Diaz	So
OL	78	AJ Crease	Fr
OL	79	Anthony Torres	So
WR	83	Donta Hayes	So
TE	84	Braelyn Dillard	Fr
WR	85	Shemar Davis	Fr
TE	86	Jeremiah Venson	Fr
TE	87	Jaylon Banks	Fr
WR	88	Ben Patterson	Fr
TE	89	Brock Johnson	So
RB		Landon Arrington	Fr
WR		Wilson Batiste	Fr
WR		Jalen Becerra	Fr
WR		Antwaan Gross	Fr
WR		Yamil Oaxaca	Fr
RB		Gabe Ramos	Fr
QB		Ryver Rodriguez	Fr
WR		Traylen Suel	Fr
RB		Cam Tyler	Fr
WR		Dorian Washington	Fr
WR		JoQwan West	Fr
WR		Ilijah Williams	Fr
RB		Kevin Young Jr.	So

Defense

Pos.	#	Name	Class
DB	0	Jaques Taylor	Jr
DB	1	Donta Staurt	Jr
DB	2	Tyson Carter	Sr
DB	4	JT Walker	Sr
DL	5	Frank Mulipola	So
DB	7	D'Ondre Robinson	Sr
DB	8	Levon Barnett	Sr
DL	9	EJ Gisa	Sr
DB	10	Justen Campbell	Sr
LB	14	Derrian Forge	Sr
DB	19	Chanlor Johnson	So
DB	20	Jaylen Henderson	So
DB	21	Antoine Tanner	So
LB	22	Caleb Pierson	Fr
DB	23	Kamren Amao	Fr
LB	24	Christia Martinez	Fr
LB	28	Jamil Pittman	Jr
DB	29	Xavier Phoenix	So
DB	30	Ashton Levells	Fr
DB	32	Dawson Burton	So
LB	34	Jalon Rocquemore	So
LB	35	Eric Franco	Fr
DB	36	Datron Brooks	Fr
LB	38	Ty Johnson	So
LB	39	Layne Horak	So
LB	40	Courtney Massingill	So
LB	42	Hayden Kelly	Jr
LB	44	Keewan Grismore	Fr
DB	46	Mark Benard	Fr
DL	52	Elden Titania	So
DL	56	Sione Teuhema	Fr
DL	57	David Adegbenro	Fr
DB	80	Jalen Thompson	Fr
DB	81	Luke Thomas	Fr
DB	82	Izeal Jones	Fr
DL	90	Wilfred Minor	So
DL	91	Vernon Henderson	Fr
DL	92	Xavier Daniels	So
DL	94	Dominique Varela	Jr
DL	95	Amari Bradford	Fr
DL	96	Gavyn Sharp	Fr
DL	97	Joseph Williams	Sr
DL	98	Oghenemine Imarah	Fr
DL	99	Victor Idusuyi	So
LB		Jaice Beck	Fr
LB		Cayden Charnik	Fr
DB		Michael Galindo	Jr
LB		Caylib Johnson	Fr
DB		Kendrick Jones	Fr
DB		Jaden Mitchell	Fr
DB		Dami Oluwoleajayi	Fr
DB		Josiah Rice	Fr

Special teams

Pos.	#	Name	Class
K, P	31	Carson Roberts	So
LS	37	Grant Gensemer	So
K	41	Hayden Decossas	Jr
K	43	Michael Mayfield	So
P	49	Sergio Landeros	Sr
LS		Jaxson Kinney	Fr

Head coach

- Justin Carrigan

Coordinators/assistant coaches

- Rob Messinger
  Associate head coach/offensive coordinator/wide receivers/special teams
- Chris Mineo
  Associate head coach/co-defensive coordinator/defensive line
- Jacob Martin
  Co-defensive coordinator/linebackers
- Brady Foltz
  Offensive line
- Mitchell Buhler
  Quarterbacks
- Jon Clark
  Defensive backs
- DT Barkey
  Defensive line
- Mike Harrison
  Running backs
- Ngala Fusimalohi
  Tight ends

Legend

- (C) Team captain
- (S) Suspended
- (I) Ineligible
- Injured
- Redshirt

Roster
Last update: August 14, 2023

== Game summaries ==
=== Southwest Baptist ===
Southwest Baptist Bearcats at UT Permian Basin Falcons – Game summary

Quarter	1	2	3	4	Total
Bearcats	17	7	17	0	41
Falcons	3	0	0	14	17

at Astound Broadband Stadium, Midland, Texas

- Date: September 3
- Game time: 6:00 p.m. CDT
- Game weather: Cloudy, 83 °F (28 °C)
- Game attendance: 4,561
- Referee: Jason Hickey
- Box score, Recap

Game information
First quarter
- SWB – Abel Carter 2-yard run (Logan Turner kick), 11:04. Bearcats 7–0. Drive: 9 plays, 75 yards, 3:56.
- TPB – Carson Roberts 41-yard field goal, 7:49. Bearcats 7–3. Drive: 10 plays, 55 yards, 3:09.
- SWB – Bryant Burns 1-yard pass from Cooper Callis (Logan Turner kick), 5:33. Bearcats 14–3. Drive: 7 plays, 51 yards, 2:07.
- SWB – Logan Turner 42-yard field goal, 1:35. Bearcats 17–3. Drive: 7 plays, 33 yards, 2:47.

Second quarter

- SWB – Abel Carter 4-yard run (Logan Turner kick), 10:21. Bearcats 24–3. Drive: 5 plays, 67 yards, 2:00.

Third quarter

- SWB – Bryant Burns 30-yard pass from Cooper Callis (Logan Turner kick), 10:52. Bearcats 31–3. Drive: 5 plays, 64 yards, 2:32.
- SWB – Abel Carter 17-yard run (Logan Turner kick), 5:09. Bearcats 38–3. Drive: 8 plays, 66 yards, 4:12.
- SWB – Logan Turner 51-yard field goal, 0:38. Bearcats 41–3. Drive: 7 plays, 14 yards, 3:00.

Fourth quarter

- TPB – Brock Johnson 7-yard pass from Dylan Graham (Carson Roberts kick), 14:34. Bearcats 41–10. Drive: 5 plays, 51 yards, 0:54.
- TPB – Timothy Wiggins 30-yard pass from Dylan Graham (Carson Roberts kick), 5:30. Bearcats 41–17. Drive: 7 plays, 62 yards, 1:34.

Statistics	SWB	TPB
First downs	31	13
Total yards	462	181
Rushing yards	249	17
Passing yards	213	164
Turnovers	0	1
Time of possession	42:05	17:55

Team	Category	Player	Statistics
Southwest Baptist	Passing	Cooper Callis	16/25, 179 yards, 2 TD
Southwest Baptist	Rushing	Abel Carter	22 rushes, 173 yards, 3 TD
Southwest Baptist	Receiving	Curtis Cuillard	5 receptions, 64 yards
UT Permian Basin	Passing	Dylan Graham	16/31, 164 yards, 2 TD, INT
UT Permian Basin	Rushing	Nathan Tilford	7 rushes, 15 yards
UT Permian Basin	Receiving	Gunnar Abseck	5 receptions, 66 yards

=== Western Colorado ===
Western Colorado Mountaineers at UT Permian Basin Falcons – Game summary

Quarter	1	2	3	4	OT	2OT	Total
Mountaineers	0	10	14	0	7	0	31
Falcons	0	10	6	8	7	3	34

at Astound Broadband Stadium, Midland, Texas

- Date: September 10
- Game time: 6:00 p.m. CDT
- Game weather: Sunny, 89 °F (32 °C)
- Game attendance: 3,278
- Referee: James Minor
- Box score, Recap

Game information
First quarter
- No scoring plays

Second quarter

- WCU – Alec Fonseca 34-yard field goal, 14:15. Mountaineers 3–0. Drive: 9 plays, 33 yards, 4:11.
- TPB – Brock Johnson 3-yard pass from Dylan Graham (Carson Roberts kick), 11:37. Falcons 7–3. Drive: 9 plays, 58 yards, 2:29.
- TPB – Carson Roberts 40-yard field goal, 7:42. Falcons 10–3. Drive: 4 plays, -1 yards, 0:55.
- WCU – Kai Emmsley 15-yard pass from Luke Nethercot (Alec Fonseca kick), 4:07. Tied 10–10. Drive: 1 play, 15 yards, 0:07.

Third quarter

- TPB – Donta Stuart 2-yard interception return (kick failed), 12:29. Falcons 16–10.
- WCU – Sage Yazzie 20-yard pass from Luke Nethercot (Alec Fonseca kick), 2:32. Mountaineers 17–16. Drive: 5 plays, 53 yards, 1:43.
- WCU – Luke Nethercot 2-yard run (Alec Fonseca kick), 0:27. Mountaineers 24–16. Drive: 3 plays, 35 yards, 1:04.

Fourth quarter

- TPB – MJ Link 15-yard pass from Dylan Graham (Dylan Graham pass to Brock Johnson), 2:23. Tied 24–24. Drive: 5 plays, 70 yards, 1:38.

First overtime

- TPB – Kory Harris 5-yard run (Carson Roberts kick). Falcons 31–24. Drive: 2 plays, 25 yards.
- WCU – Kai Emmsley 5-yard pass from Connor Desch (Alec Fonseca kick). Tied 31–31. Drive: 4 plays, 25 yards.

Second overtime

- TPB – Carson Roberts 35-yard field goal. Falcons 34–31. Drive: 4 plays, 8 yards.

Statistics	WCU	TPB
First downs	20	15
Total yards	226	261
Rushing yards	38	76
Passing yards	188	185
Turnovers	4	2
Time of possession	35:57	24:03

Team	Category	Player	Statistics
Western Colorado	Passing	Luke Nethercot	18/34, 160 yards, 2 TD, 2 INT
Western Colorado	Rushing	Luke Nethercot	16 rushes, 28 yards, TD
Western Colorado	Receiving	Kai Emmsley	6 receptions, 49 yards, 2 TD
UT Permian Basin	Passing	Dylan Graham	17/38, 185 yards, 2 TD, INT
UT Permian Basin	Rushing	Kory Harris	21 rushes, 78 yards, TD
UT Permian Basin	Receiving	Marcus Molina	2 receptions, 44 yards

=== No. 5 Angelo State ===
No. 5 Angelo State Rams at UT Permian Basin Falcons – Game summary

Quarter	1	2	3	4	Total
No. 5 Rams	14	10	0	10	34
Falcons	0	7	14	0	21

at Astound Broadband Stadium, Midland, Texas

- Date: September 17
- Game time: 6:00 p.m. CDT
- Game weather: Sunny, 90 °F (32 °C)
- Game attendance: 3,287
- Referee: Tony Acosta
- Box score, Recap

Game information
First quarter
- ASU – Andrew Pitts 41-yard interception return (Asa Fuller kick), 6:19. Rams 7–0.
- ASU – Nate Omayebu III 1-yard run (Asa Fuller kick), 2:26. Rams 14–0. Drive: 7 plays, 64 yards, 2:38.

Second quarter

- ASU – Asa Fuller 21-yard field goal, 14:05. Rams 17–0. Drive: 6 plays, 34 yards, 1:41.
- ASU – Nate Omayebu III 12-yard pass from Zach Bronkhorst (Asa Fuller kick), 10:54. Rams 24–0. Drive: 6 plays, 36 yards, 2:15.
- TPB – Suddin Sapien 1-yard run (Carson Roberts kick), 7:49. Rams 24–7. Drive: 7 plays, 62 yards, 2:58.

Third quarter

- TPB – MJ Link 76-yard pass from Jordan Barton (Carson Roberts kick), 5:06. Rams 24–14. Drive: 3 plays, 82 yards, 0:45.
- TPB – MJ Link 70-yard pass from Jordan Barton (Carson Roberts kick), 1:40. Rams 24–21. Drive: 2 plays, 87 yards, 0:33.

Fourth quarter

- ASU – Asa Fuller 46-yard field goal, 8:33. Rams 27–21. Drive: 10 plays, 40 yards, 5:11.
- ASU – Drew Carstens 5-yard pass from Zach Bronkhorst (Asa Fuller kick), 4:03. Rams 34–21. Drive: 6 plays, 50 yards, 3:30.

Statistics	ASU	TPB
First downs	25	13
Total yards	436	258
Rushing yards	111	12
Passing yards	325	246
Turnovers	1	3
Time of possession	37:59	22:01

Team	Category	Player	Statistics
Angelo State	Passing	Zach Bronkhorst	22/42, 325 yards, 2 TD
Angelo State	Rushing	Nate Omayebu III	26 rushes, 130 yards, TD
Angelo State	Receiving	Kyle Bradford	4 receptions, 78 yards
UT Permian Basin	Passing	Jordan Barton	10/19, 246 yards, 2 TD, 3 INT
UT Permian Basin	Rushing	Kory Harris	17 rushes, 47 yards
UT Permian Basin	Receiving	MJ Link	5 receptions, 191 yards, 2 TD

=== At Western Oregon ===
UT Permian Basin Falcons at Western Oregon Wolves – Game summary

Quarter	1	2	3	4	Total
Falcons	0	14	7	6	27
Wolves	0	10	7	7	24

at McArthur Field, Monmouth, Oregon

- Date: September 24
- Game time: 4:30 p.m. CDT/2:30 p.m. PDT
- Game weather: Sunny
- Game attendance: 1,189
- Referee: Andy Dunklin
- Box score, Recap

Game information
First quarter
- No scoring plays

Second quarter

- WOU – Daniel Cossette 35-yard field goal, 14:55. Wolves 3–0. Drive: 13 plays, 57 yards, 0:05.
- WOU – London Smalley 73-yard pass from Gannon Winker (Daniel Cossette kick), 11:29. Wolves 10–0. Drive: 1 play, 73 yards, 0:11.
- TPB – Gunnar Abseck 12-yard pass from Dylan Graham (Carson Roberts kick), 8:44. Wolves 10–7. Drive: 8 plays, 77 yards, 2:45.
- TPB – Jamil Pittman 26-yard fumble return (Carson Roberts kick), 2:59. Falcons 14–10.

Third quarter

- TPB – MJ Link 13-yard pass from Dylan Graham (Carson Roberts kick), 12:11. Falcons 21–10. Drive: 10 plays, 75 yards, 2:49.
- WOU – Damon Hickok 51-yard pass from Gannon Winker (Daniel Cossette kick), 2:31. Falcons 21–17. Drive: 1 play, 51 yards, 0:15.

Fourth quarter

- TPB – Hayden Kelly 55-yard interception return (run failed), 0:40. Falcons 27–17.
- WOU – Logan Reese 15-yard pass from Gannon Winker (Daniel Cossette kick), 0:03. Falcons 27–24. Drive: 4 plays, 64 yards, 0:35.

Statistics	TPB	WOU
First downs	20	28
Total yards	288	554
Rushing yards	50	187
Passing yards	238	367
Turnovers	1	2
Time of possession	23:54	30:21

Team	Category	Player	Statistics
UT Permian Basin	Passing	Dylan Graham	34/52, 238 yards, 2 TD, INT
UT Permian Basin	Rushing	Kory Harris	9 rushes, 25 yards
UT Permian Basin	Receiving	Gunnar Abseck	9 receptions, 50 yards, TD
Western Oregon	Passing	Gannon Winker	20/43, 367 yards, 3 TD, INT
Western Oregon	Rushing	Omari Land	24 rushes, 127 yards
Western Oregon	Receiving	Damon Hickok	5 receptions, 134 yards, TD

=== At West Texas A&M ===
UT Permian Basin Falcons at West Texas A&M Buffaloes – Game summary

Quarter	1	2	3	4	Total
Falcons	0	14	10	3	27
Buffaloes	9	7	3	9	28

at Buffalo Stadium, Canyon, Texas

- Date: October 1
- Game time: 7:00 p.m. CDT
- Game weather: Sunny, 83 °F (28 °C)
- Game attendance: 9,414
- Referee: Randy Adams
- Box score, Recap

Game information
First quarter
- WT – Gage Urias 33-yard field goal, 8:56. Buffaloes 3–0. Drive: 10 plays, 32 yards, 3:19.
- WT – Gage Urias 49-yard field goal, 5:28. Buffaloes 6–0. Drive: 7 plays, 36 yards, 2:16.
- WT – Gage Urias 20-yard field goal, 0:17. Buffaloes 9–0. Drive: 5 plays, 21 yards, 1:37.

Second quarter

- WT – Jarrod Compton 18-yard run (Gage Urias kick), 12:34. Buffaloes 16–0. Drive: 5 plays, 34 yards, 1:37.
- TPB – MJ Link 47-yard pass from Dylan Graham (Carson Roberts kick), 11:24. Buffaloes 16–7. Drive: 4 plays, 88 yards, 1:10.
- TPB – MJ Link 6-yard pass from Antonio Malone (Carson Roberts kick), 3:08. Buffaloes 16–14. Drive: 9 plays, 64 yards, 2:43.

Third quarter

- TPB – Carson Roberts 34-yard field goal, 9:22. Falcons 17–16. Drive: 16 plays, 60 yards, 5:14.
- WT – Gage Urias 45-yard field goal, 5:25. Buffaloes 19–17. Drive: 10 plays, 47 yards, 3:57.
- TPB – Jeremiah Venson 6-yard pass from Dylan Graham (Carson Roberts kick), 2:36. Falcons 24–19. Drive: 12 plays, 75 yards, 2:49.

Fourth quarter

- WT – Nick Gerber 2-yard run (pass failed), 13:28. Buffaloes 25–24. Drive: 10 plays, 60 yards, 3:06.
- TPB – Carson Roberts 33-yard field goal, 8:56. Falcons 27–25. Drive: 9 plays, 48 yards, 4:26.
- WT – Gage Urias 32-yard field goal, 0:04. Buffaloes 28–27. Drive: 12 plays, 51 yards, 2:03.

Statistics	TPB	WT
First downs	21	27
Total yards	419	503
Rushing yards	107	232
Passing yards	312	271
Turnovers	2	2
Time of possession	27:18	32:42

Team	Category	Player	Statistics
UT Permian Basin	Passing	Dylan Graham	33/46, 306 yards, 2 TD, INT
UT Permian Basin	Rushing	Antonio Malone	11 rushes, 58 yards
UT Permian Basin	Receiving	MJ Link	12 receptions, 114 yards, 2 TD
West Texas A&M	Passing	Nick Gerber	27/43, 271 yards
West Texas A&M	Rushing	Nick Gerber	14 rushes, 105 yards, TD
West Texas A&M	Receiving	Noah Bogardus	11 receptions, 195 yards

=== Simon Fraser ===
Simon Fraser Red Leafs at UT Permian Basin Falcons – Game summary

Quarter	1	2	3	4	OT	Total
Red Leafs	0	9	7	8	0	24
Falcons	7	14	0	3	7	31

at Ratliff Stadium, Odessa, Texas

- Date: October 8
- Game time: 6:00 p.m. CDT
- Game weather: Sunny
- Game attendance: 3,742
- Referee: Joe Greer
- Box score, Recap

Game information
First quarter
- TPB – Gunnar Abseck 19-yard pass from Dylan Graham (Carson Roberts kick), 7:37. Falcons 7–0. Drive: 9 plays, 74 yards, 3:12.

Second quarter

- TPB – Brock Johnson 11-yard pass from MJ Link (Carson Roberts kick), 13:50. Falcons 14–0. Drive: 12 plays, 80 yards, 3:58.
- SFU – Dylan Graham sacked in end zone, 9:08. Falcons 14–2.
- TPB – MJ Link 93-yard pass from Dylan Graham (Carson Roberts kick), 6:58. Falcons 21–2. Drive: 3 plays, 96 yards, 0:41.
- SFU – Robert Meadors 12-yard pass from Justin Seiber (Kristie Elliott kick), 2:13. Falcons 21–9. Drive: 4 plays, 80 yards, 2:25.

Third quarter

- SFU – Ethan Beselt 39-yard pass from Justin Seiber (Kristie Elliott kick), 5:14. Falcons 21–16. Drive: 8 plays, 89 yards, 3:34.

Fourth quarter

- TPB – Carson Roberts 20-yard field goal, 12:22. Falcons 24–16. Drive: 7 plays, 65 yards, 2:42.
- SFU – Sam Davenport 6-yard pass from Justin Seiber (Justin Seiber pass to Robert Meadors), 3:13. Tied 24–24. Drive: 4 plays, 76 yards, 2:25.

Overtime

- TPB – Kory Harris 1-yard run (Carson Roberts kick). Falcons 31–24. Drive: 7 plays, 25 yards.

Statistics	SFU	TPB
First downs	19	25
Total yards	417	462
Rushing yards	21	150
Passing yards	396	312
Turnovers	1	1
Time of possession	33:53	26:07

Team	Category	Player	Statistics
Simon Fraser	Passing	Justin Seiber	23/39, 396 yards, 3 TD, INT
Simon Fraser	Rushing	Mason Glover	8 rushes, 17 yards
Simon Fraser	Receiving	Ethan Beselt	8 receptions, 223 yards, TD
UT Permian Basin	Passing	Dylan Graham	28/40, 301 yards, 2 TD, INT
UT Permian Basin	Rushing	Antonio Malone	21 rushes, 110 yards
UT Permian Basin	Receiving	MJ Link	8 receptions, 141 yards, TD

=== At No. 20 Texas A&M–Kingsville ===
UT Permian Basin Falcons at No. 20 Texas A&M–Kingsville Javelinas – Game summary

Quarter	1	2	3	4	Total
Falcons	0	7	3	0	10
No. 20 Javelinas	3	0	0	10	13

at Javelina Stadium, Kingsville, Texas

- Date: October 15
- Game time: 7:00 p.m. CDT
- Game weather: Sunny
- Game attendance: 9,136
- Box score, Recap

Game information
First quarter
- AMK – Gilbert Garza 38-yard field goal, 7:54. Javelinas 3–0. Drive: 4 plays, 4 yards, 1:16.

Second quarter

- TPB – Gunnar Abseck 4-yard pass from Dylan Graham (Carson Roberts kick), 5:31. Falcons 7–3. Drive: 11 plays, 97 yards, 5:02.

Third quarter

- TPB – Carson Roberts 22-yard field goal, 8:58. Falcons 10–3. Drive: 10 plays, 34 yards, 3:01.

Fourth quarter

- AMK – Gilbert Garza 40-yard field goal, 12:10. Falcons 10–6. Drive: 14 plays, 61 yards, 4:27.
- AMK – Craig Clemons 19-yard pass from Jacob Cavazos (Gilbert Garza kick), 1:26. Javelinas 13–10. Drive: 3 plays, 30 yards, 0:40.

Statistics	TPB	AMK
First downs	13	18
Total yards	209	269
Rushing yards	30	104
Passing yards	179	165
Turnovers	3	1
Time of possession	24:30	35:30

Team	Category	Player	Statistics
UT Permian Basin	Passing	Dylan Graham	16/30, 179 yards, TD, 2 INT
UT Permian Basin	Rushing	Caden Cox	18 rushes, 51 yards
UT Permian Basin	Receiving	MJ Link	5 receptions, 71 yards
Texas A&M–Kingsville	Passing	Jacob Cavazos	18/30, 165 yards, TD, INT
Texas A&M–Kingsville	Rushing	Christian Anderson	19 rushes, 73 yards
Texas A&M–Kingsville	Receiving	Jason Gaines	4 receptions, 57 yards

=== Midwestern State ===
Midwestern State Mustangs at UT Permian Basin Falcons – Game summary

Quarter	1	2	3	4	Total
Mustangs	0	7	8	9	24
Falcons	14	6	3	0	23

at Astound Broadband Stadium, Midland, Texas

- Date: October 22
- Game time: 6:00 p.m. CDT
- Game weather: Sunny
- Game attendance: 3,561
- Referee: Dwayne Martin
- Box score, Recap

Game information
First quarter
- TPB – Brock Johnson 2-yard pass from Dylan Graham (Michael Mayfield kick), 4:09. Falcons 7–0. Drive: 10 plays, 39 yards, 3:59.
- TPB – Timothy Wiggins 27-yard pass from Dylan Graham (Michael Mayfield kick), 4:02. Falcons 14–0. Drive: 1 play, 27 yards, 0:07.

Second quarter

- MSU – Devin Cross 9-yard pass from Dillon Sterling-Cole (Ritse Vaes kick), 14:53. Falcons 14–7. Drive: 10 plays, 75 yards, 4:09.
- TPB – Michael Mayfield 42-yard field goal, 8:48. Falcons 17–7. Drive: 4 plays, 3 yards, 2:03.
- TPB – Michael Mayfield 45-yard field goal, 0:16. Falcons 20–7. Drive: 8 plays, 40 yards, 4:33.

Third quarter

- TPB – Michael Mayfield 45-yard field goal, 5:17. Falcons 23–7. Drive: 13 plays, 49 yards, 6:51.
- MSU – Devin Cross 1-yard pass from Dillon Sterling-Cole (Dillon Sterling-Cole pass to Kelby Hickerson), 0:12. Falcons 23–15. Drive: 15 plays, 84 yards, 5:01.

Fourth quarter

- MSU – Ja'Marzeyea Arvie 9-yard pass from Dillon Sterling-Cole (pass failed), 6:43. Falcons 23–21. Drive: 15 plays, 97 yards, 6:01.
- MSU – Ritse Vaes 42-yard field goal, 0:09. Mustangs 24–23. Drive: 8 plays, 40 yards, 1:21.

Statistics	MSU	TPB
First downs	24	19
Total yards	377	284
Rushing yards	173	187
Passing yards	204	97
Turnovers	4	1
Time of possession	25:15	34:45

Team	Category	Player	Statistics
Midwestern State	Passing	Dillon Sterling-Cole	22/37, 204 yards, 3 TD, INT
Midwestern State	Rushing	Devin Cross	20 rushes, 100 yards
Midwestern State	Receiving	Ja'Marzeyea Arvie	6 receptions, 83 yards, TD
UT Permian Basin	Passing	Dylan Graham	14/25, 97 yards, 2 TD
UT Permian Basin	Rushing	Taj Crenshaw	13 rushes, 100 yards
UT Permian Basin	Receiving	Timothy Wiggins	3 receptions, 45 yards, TD

=== At Eastern New Mexico ===
UT Permian Basin Falcons at Eastern New Mexico Greyhounds – Game summary

Quarter	1	2	3	4	Total
Falcons	6	10	0	8	24
Greyhounds	7	7	7	0	21

at Greyhound Stadium, Portales, New Mexico

- Date: October 29
- Game time: 2:00 p.m. CDT/1:00 p.m. MDT
- Game weather: Sunny, 62 °F (17 °C)
- Game attendance: 1,422
- Referee: Rex Rose
- Box score, Recap

Game information
First quarter
- TPB – MJ Link 54-yard pass from Dylan Graham (kick failed), 11:35. Falcons 6–0. Drive: 3 plays, 72 yards, 0:42.
- ENM – Greg Thomas 18-yard pass from Kason Martin (Cooper Hamilton kick), 0:41. Greyhounds 7–6. Drive: 6 plays, 65 yards, 2:59.

Second quarter

- ENM – Howard Russell 38-yard run (Cooper Hamilton kick), 8:59. Greyhounds 14–6. Drive: 4 plays, 71 yards, 1:51.
- TPB – Michael Mayfield 26-yard field goal, 6:15. Greyhounds 14–9. Drive: 10 plays, 66 yards, 2:44.
- TPB – Gunnar Abseck 13-yard pass from Dylan Graham (Michael Mayfield kick), 0:07. Falcons 16–14. Drive: 9 plays, 70 yards, 1:02.

Third quarter

- ENM – Bryzai White 34-yard pass from Kason Martin (Cooper Hamilton kick), 13:09. Greyhounds 21–16. Drive: 1 play, 49 yards, 0:10.

Fourth quarter

- TPB – MJ Link 12-yard pass from Dylan Graham (Dylan Graham pass to MJ Link), 14:07. Falcons 24–21. Drive: 4 plays, 66 yards, 0:57.

Statistics	TPB	ENM
First downs	25	24
Total yards	475	368
Rushing yards	137	166
Passing yards	338	202
Turnovers	1	1
Time of possession	26:15	33:45

Team	Category	Player	Statistics
UT Permian Basin	Passing	Dylan Graham	25/50, 338 yards, 3 TD, INT
UT Permian Basin	Rushing	Taj Crenshaw	13 rushes, 66 yards
UT Permian Basin	Receiving	MJ Link	7 receptions, 129 yards, 2 TD
Eastern New Mexico	Passing	Kason Martin	12/30, 202 yards, 2 TD, INT
Eastern New Mexico	Rushing	Isaiah Tate	26 rushes, 93 yards
Eastern New Mexico	Receiving	Bryzai White	3 receptions, 77 yards, TD

=== Western New Mexico ===
Western New Mexico Mustangs at UT Permian Basin Falcons – Game summary

Quarter	1	2	3	4	Total
Mustangs	7	7	0	0	14
Falcons	0	23	14	0	37

at Ratliff Stadium, Odessa, Texas

- Date: November 5
- Game time: 6:00 p.m. CDT
- Game weather: Sunny
- Game attendance: 3,268
- Referee: Kyle Fuehrer
- Box score, Recap

Game information
First quarter
- WNM – Grant Patterson 2-yard run (Adrian Zamudio kick), 8:03. Mustangs 7–0. Drive: 8 plays, 80 yards, 4:01.

Second quarter

- TPB – Grant Patterson tackled in end zone, 13:31. Mustangs 7–2.
- TPB – Nathan Tilford 5-yard run (Michael Mayfield kick), 9:29. Falcons 9–7. Drive: 11 plays, 53 yards, 3:53.
- TPB – Taj Crenshaw 12-yard run (Michael Mayfield kick), 7:43. Falcons 16–7. Drive: 3 plays, 23 yards, 0:53.
- WNM – Vincent Rankin 25-yard pass from Grant Patterson (Adrian Zamudio kick), 2:32. Falcons 16–14. Drive: 10 plays, 75 yards, 5:11.
- TPB – Joseph Williams 1-yard run (Michael Mayfield kick), 0:10. Falcons 23–14. Drive: 13 plays, 75 yards, 2:22.

Third quarter

- TPB – Nathan Tilford 1-yard run (Michael Mayfield kick), 11:40. Falcons 30–14. Drive: 7 plays, 63 yards, 2:20.
- TPB – Victor Idusuyi 19-yard fumble return (Michael Mayfield kick), 11:07. Falcons 37–14.

Fourth quarter

- No scoring plays

Statistics	WNM	TPB
First downs	13	32
Total yards	223	485
Rushing yards	68	351
Passing yards	155	134
Turnovers	3	3
Time of possession	24:42	35:18

Team	Category	Player	Statistics
Western New Mexico	Passing	Grant Patterson	6/20, 102 yards, TD, 2 INT
Western New Mexico	Rushing	Grant Patterson	10 rushes, 29 yards, TD
Western New Mexico	Receiving	David Telles	6 receptions, 72 yards
UT Permian Basin	Passing	Gabe Herrera	8/19, 83 yards, INT
UT Permian Basin	Rushing	Nathan Tilford	14 rushes, 108 yards, 2 TD
UT Permian Basin	Receiving	Gunnar Abseck	4 receptions, 50 yards

=== At Central Washington ===
UT Permian Basin Falcons at Central Washington Wildcats – Game summary

Quarter	1	2	3	4	Total
Falcons	7	0	7	0	14
Wildcats	14	28	0	7	49

at Tomlinson Stadium, Ellensburg, Washington

- Date: November 12
- Game time: 1:00 p.m. CST/11:00 a.m. PST
- Game weather: Clear, 42 °F (6 °C)
- Game attendance: 4,872
- Referee: Tim Gloudeman
- Box score, Recap

Game information
First quarter
- CWU – JJ Lemming 4-yard run (Ashton Wolff kick), 11:48. Wildcats 7–0. Drive: 6 plays, 80 yards, 3:12.
- TPB – Gabe Herrera 1-yard run (Michael Mayfield kick), 4:28. Tied 7–7. Drive: 19 plays, 75 yards, 7:20.
- CWU – Demonte Horton 13-yard pass from JJ Lemming (Ashton Wolff kick), 0:22. Wildcats 14–7. Drive: 8 plays, 67 yards, 4:06.

Second quarter

- CWU – Cameron Daniels 12-yard run (Ashton Wolff kick), 14:19. Wildcats 21–7. Drive: 2 plays, 25 yards, 0:41.
- CWU – Demonte Horton 5-yard pass from JJ Lemming (Ashton Wolff kick), 11:12. Wildcats 28–7. Drive: 4 plays, 65 yards, 1:16.
- CWU – Cameron Daniels 24-yard run (Ashton Wolff kick), 5:52. Wildcats 35–7. Drive: 4 plays, 38 yards, 1:29.
- CWU – Tre'Jon Henderson 11-yard run (Ashton Wolff kick), 2:08. Wildcats 42–7. Drive: 5 plays, 75 yards, 2:26.

Third quarter

- TPB – MJ Link 27-yard run (Michael Mayfield kick), 7:43. Wildcats 42–14. Drive: 5 plays, 83 yards, 2:09.

Fourth quarter

- CWU – JJ Lemming 5-yard run (Ashton Wolff kick), 2:43. Wildcats 49–14. Drive: 2 plays, 10 yards, 0:45.

Statistics	TPB	CWU
First downs	17	28
Total yards	309	502
Rushing yards	178	323
Passing yards	131	179
Turnovers	4	1
Time of possession	25:37	34:23

Team	Category	Player	Statistics
UT Permian Basin	Passing	MJ Link	9/23, 83 yards
UT Permian Basin	Rushing	MJ Link	12 rushes, 103 yards, TD
UT Permian Basin	Receiving	Gunnar Abseck	6 receptions, 55 yards
Central Washington	Passing	JJ Lemming	14/23, 179 yards, 2 TD, INT
Central Washington	Rushing	Cameron Daniels	25 rushes, 222 yards, 2 TD
Central Washington	Receiving	Marcus Cook	6 receptions, 108 yards

== Statistics ==
=== Scoring ===
Scores against non-conference opponents

	1	2	3	4	OT	2OT	Total
Opponents	17	17	31	0	7	0	72
UT Permian Basin	3	10	6	22	7	3	51

Scores against the Lone Star Conference

	1	2	3	4	OT	Total
Opponents	54	85	32	60	0	231
UT Permian Basin	34	95	58	20	7	214

Scores against all opponents

	1	2	3	4	OT	2OT	Total
Opponents	71	102	63	60	7	0	303
UT Permian Basin	37	105	64	42	14	3	265
