= 2022 Midwestern State Mustangs football team =

American college football season

2022 Midwestern State Mustangs football
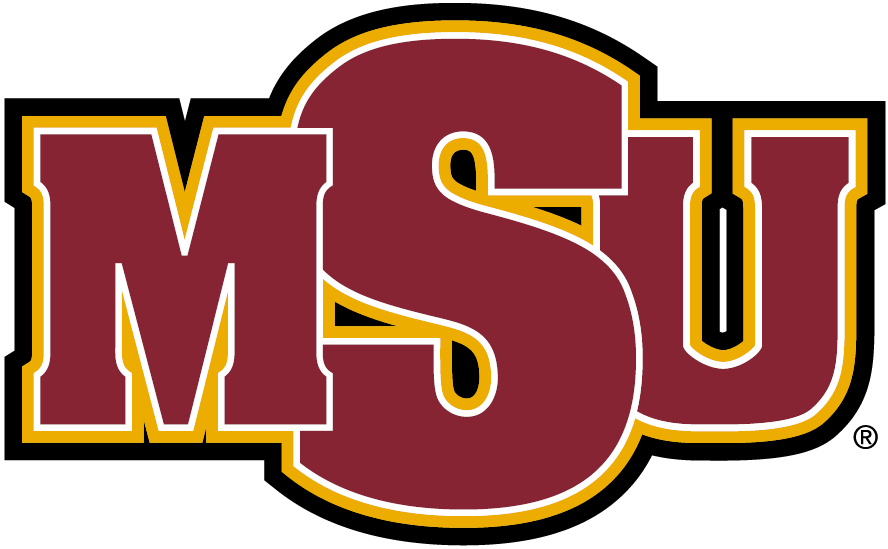
- Conference: Lone Star Conference
- Record: 6–5 (5–4 GSC)
- Head coach: Bill Maskill (21st season)
- Offensive coordinator: Josh Miller (1st season)
- Offensive scheme: Pro-style
- Defensive coordinator: Rich Renner (15th season)
- Base defense: 4–3
- Home stadium: Memorial Stadium

2022 Lone Star Conference football standings
	Conf.			Overall
Team	W		L	W		L
No. 7 Angelo State $^	9	–	0	12	–	1
Central Washington	6	–	3	6	–	4
Texas A&M–Kingsville #	5	–	4	7	–	5
Midwestern State	5	–	4	6	–	5
Western New Mexico	5	–	4	6	–	5
Western Oregon	5	–	4	6	–	5
UT Permian Basin	4	–	5	5	–	6
West Texas A&M	3	–	6	5	–	6
Eastern New Mexico	2	–	7	3	–	8
Simon Fraser	1	–	8	1	–	9
$ – Conference champion; ^ – NCAA Division II playoff participant; # – Heritage Bowl participant; Rankings from AFCA poll

The 2022 Midwestern State Mustangs football team represented Midwestern State University as a member of the Lone Star Conference (LSC) during the 2022 NCAA Division II football season. They were led by twenty-first-year head coach Bill Maskill. The Mustangs played their home games at Memorial Stadium in Wichita Falls, Texas.

== Previous season ==
The Mustangs finished the 2021 season 7–3, 6–1 in Lone Star Conference (LSC) play, finished first in the conference standings. First time winning the conference title since the 2017 season. As conference champions, Midwestern State did not qualify to the playoffs.

== Preseason ==
=== LSC media poll ===
The LSC media poll was released on July 26, 2022. The Mustangs were predicted to finish second in the conference.

== Schedule ==
Date	Time	Opponent	Rank	Site	Result	Attendance
September 3	6:00 p.m.	CSU Pueblo*	No. 24	Memorial Stadium; Wichita Falls, TX	L 27–59	7,123
September 10	7:00 p.m.	at Eastern New Mexico		Greyhound Stadium; Portales, NM	W 28–14	2,084
September 17	7:00 p.m.	Michigan Tech*		Memorial Stadium; Wichita Falls, TX	W 28–21	6,222
September 24	7:00 p.m.	Simon Fraser		Memorial Stadium; Wichita Falls, TX	W 77–0	7,693
October 1	7:00 p.m.	at Western New Mexico		Altamirano Stadium; Silver City, NM	L 27–30	1,234
October 8	7:00 p.m.	West Texas A&M		Memorial Stadium; Wichita Falls, TX	L 26–38	7,128
October 15	8:00 p.m.	at Central Washington		Tomlinson Stadium; Ellensburg, WA	L 10–17	5,883
October 22	6:00 p.m.	at Texas–Permian Basin		Ratliff Stadium; Odessa, TX	W 24–23	3,561
October 29	7:00 p.m.	Western Oregon^{†}		Memorial Stadium; Wichita Falls, TX	W 26–21	6,512
November 5	7:00 p.m.	at Texas A&M–Kingsville		Javelina Stadium; Kingsville, TX	W 41–37	5,120
November 12	1:00 p.m.	No. 2 Angelo State		Memorial Stadium; Wichita Falls, TX	L 19–37	6,167
*Non-conference game; ^{†}Homecoming; Rankings from AFCA Poll released prior to the game; All times are in Central time

== Rankings ==
Ranking movements Legend: ██ Increase in ranking ██ Decrease in ranking — = Not ranked RV = Received votes
	Week												
Poll	Pre	1	2	3	4	5	6	7	8	9	10	11	Final
AFCA	24	—	—	RV	RV	—	—	—	—	—	—	—	
