= 2022 West Texas A&M Buffaloes football team =

American college football season

2022 West Texas A&M Buffaloes football
- Conference: Lone Star Conference
- Record: 5–6 (3–6 LSC)
- Head coach: Hunter Hughes (6th season)
- Offensive coordinator: Russ Martin (3rd season)
- Offensive scheme: Spread
- Defensive coordinator: J. T. Haddan (1st season)
- Base defense: 3–4
- Home stadium: Bain–Schaeffer Buffalo Stadium

2022 Lone Star Conference football standings
	Conf.			Overall
Team	W		L	W		L
No. 7 Angelo State $^	9	–	0	12	–	1
Central Washington	6	–	3	6	–	4
Texas A&M–Kingsville #	5	–	4	7	–	5
Midwestern State	5	–	4	6	–	5
Western New Mexico	5	–	4	6	–	5
Western Oregon	5	–	4	6	–	5
UT Permian Basin	4	–	5	5	–	6
West Texas A&M	3	–	6	5	–	6
Eastern New Mexico	2	–	7	3	–	8
Simon Fraser	1	–	8	1	–	9
$ – Conference champion; ^ – NCAA Division II playoff participant; # – Heritage Bowl participant; Rankings from AFCA Poll

The 2022 West Texas A&M Buffaloes football team represented West Texas A&M University during the 2022 NCAA Division II football season as a member of the Lone Star Conference (LSC). The Buffaloes were led by sixth-year head coach Hunter Hughes and played their home games at the newly renamed Bain–Schaeffer Buffalo Stadium in Canyon, Texas.

Following the season, Hughes was fired as the program's head coach. The Buffs went 32–29 under Hughes through six seasons.

== LSC media poll ==
The LSC media poll was released on July 26, 2022. The Buffaloes were predicted to finish fourth in the conference, and they received one first-place vote.

== Schedule ==
Date	Time	Opponent	Rank	Site	Result	Attendance
September 3	7:00 p.m.	No. 17 Western Colorado*		Bain–Schaeffer Buffalo Stadium; Canyon, TX	W 44–6	6,781
September 10	7:00 p.m.	at Adams State*	No. 23	Rex Stadium; Alamosa, CO	W 34–19	1,543
September 17	7:00 p.m.	Texas A&M–Kingsville	No. 14	Bain–Schaeffer Buffalo Stadium; Canyon, TX	L 24–31	7,337
September 24	6:00 p.m.	at No. 4 Angelo State		LeGrand Sports Complex; San Angelo, TX	L 14–34	4,283
October 1	7:00 p.m.	UT Permian Basin^{†}		Bain–Schaeffer Buffalo Stadium; Canyon, TX	W 28–27	9,414
October 8	7:00 p.m.	at Midwestern State		Memorial Stadium; Wichita Falls, TX	W 38–26	7,128
October 15	3:05 p.m.	at Western Oregon		MacArthur Field; Monmouth, OR	L 13–27	1,212
October 22	7:00 p.m.	Central Washington		Bain–Schaeffer Buffalo Stadium; Canyon, TX	W 35–16	6,033
October 29	1:00 p.m.	at Western New Mexico		Altamirano Stadium; Silver City, NM	L 37–41	805
November 5	6:00 p.m.	Eastern New Mexico		Bain–Schaeffer Buffalo Stadium; Canyon, TX (Wagon Wheel)	L 21–24	5,469
November 12	8:00 p.m.	at Simon Fraser		Terry Fox Field; Burnaby, BC	L 14–46	649
*Non-conference game; ^{†}Homecoming; Rankings from AFCA Poll released prior to the game; All times are in Central time

== Rankings ==
Ranking movements Legend: ██ Increase in ranking ██ Decrease in ranking — = Not ranked RV = Received votes
	Week												
Poll	Pre	1	2	3	4	5	6	7	8	9	10	11	Final
AFCA	RV	23	14	RV	—	—	—	—	—	—	—	—	—

== Game summaries ==
=== No. 17 Western Colorado ===
	1	2	3	4	Total
No. 17 Mountaineers	3	3	0	0	6
Buffaloes	20	7	0	17	44

Statistics	WCU	WT
First downs	18	25
Total yards	295	479
Rushing yards	125	229
Passing yards	170	250
Turnovers	4	1
Time of possession	28:29	31:31

Team	Category	Player	Statistics
Western Colorado	Passing	Connor Desch	10/21, 103 yards, INT
Western Colorado	Rushing	Braeden Hogan	18 rushes, 86 yards
Western Colorado	Receiving	Braeden Hogan	3 receptions, 34 yards
West Texas A&M	Passing	Nick Gerber	15/25, 186 yards, 2 TD, INT
West Texas A&M	Rushing	Jarrod Compton	18 rushes, 86 yards
West Texas A&M	Receiving	Noah Bogardus	6 receptions, 118 yards, TD

=== At Adams State ===
	1	2	3	4	Total
No. 23 Buffaloes	10	10	7	7	34
Grizzlies	3	3	6	7	19

Statistics	WT	ASU
First downs	29	22
Total yards	443	361
Rushing yards	219	134
Passing yards	224	227
Turnovers	0	2
Time of possession	33:08	26:52

Team	Category	Player	Statistics
West Texas A&M	Passing	Nick Gerber	26/42, 224 yards, TD
West Texas A&M	Rushing	Brian Okoye	11 rushes, 74 yards
West Texas A&M	Receiving	Jeremie Karngbaye	2 receptions, 34 yards
Adams State	Passing	Mark Salazar	30/51, 227 yards, INT
Adams State	Rushing	Daylen Boddie	16 rushes, 64 yards, TD
Adams State	Receiving	Elijah Harper	8 receptions, 69 yards

=== Texas A&M–Kingsville ===
	1	2	3	4	Total
Javelinas	10	0	14	7	31
No. 14 Buffaloes	0	10	14	0	24

Statistics	AMK	WT
First downs	15	16
Total yards	366	317
Rushing yards	124	103
Passing yards	242	214
Turnovers	2	6
Time of possession	36:17	23:43

Team	Category	Player	Statistics
Texas A&M–Kingsville	Passing	Jacob Cavazos	20/30, 235 yards, 2 TD, 2 INT
Texas A&M–Kingsville	Rushing	Chris Anderson	34 rushes, 155 yards, 2 TD
Texas A&M–Kingsville	Receiving	Craig Clemons	4 receptions, 103 yards
West Texas A&M	Passing	Nick Gerber	12/26, 214 yards, 2 TD, 3 INT
West Texas A&M	Rushing	Isaiah Smallwood	13 rushes, 50 yards
West Texas A&M	Receiving	Shakell Brown	3 receptions, 84 yards, TD

=== At No. 4 Angelo State ===
	1	2	3	4	Total
Buffaloes	0	7	0	7	14
No. 4 Rams	6	0	14	14	34

Statistics	WT	ASU
First downs	20	23
Total yards	356	455
Rushing yards	117	176
Passing yards	239	279
Turnovers	2	2
Time of possession	30:00	30:00

Team	Category	Player	Statistics
West Texas A&M	Passing	Nick Gerber	14/24, 189 yards
West Texas A&M	Rushing	Jarrod Compton	15 rushes, 61 yards
West Texas A&M	Receiving	Noah Bogardus	3 receptions, 71 yards
Angelo State	Passing	Zach Bronkhorst	27/39, 279 yards, TD, INT
Angelo State	Rushing	Nate Omayebu III	19 rushes, 97 yards, TD
Angelo State	Receiving	Rasheen Green	5 receptions, 67 yards

=== UT Permian Basin ===
	1	2	3	4	Total
Falcons	0	14	10	3	27
Buffaloes	9	7	3	9	28

Statistics	TPB	WT
First downs	21	27
Total yards	419	503
Rushing yards	107	232
Passing yards	312	271
Turnovers	2	2
Time of possession	27:18	32:42

Team	Category	Player	Statistics
UT Permian Basin	Passing	Dylan Graham	33/46, 306 yards, 2 TD, INT
UT Permian Basin	Rushing	Antonio Malone	11 rushes, 58 yards
UT Permian Basin	Receiving	MJ Link	12 receptions, 114 yards, 2 TD
West Texas A&M	Passing	Nick Gerber	27/43, 271 yards
West Texas A&M	Rushing	Nick Gerber	14 rushes, 105 yards, TD
West Texas A&M	Receiving	Noah Bogardus	11 receptions, 195 yards

=== At Midwestern State ===
	1	2	3	4	Total
Buffaloes	14	14	7	3	38
Mustangs	10	0	13	3	26

Statistics	WT	MSU
First downs	29	19
Total yards	585	402
Rushing yards	277	171
Passing yards	308	231
Turnovers	1	4
Time of possession	36:51	23:01

Team	Category	Player	Statistics
West Texas A&M	Passing	Nick Gerber	23/28, 308 yards, TD
West Texas A&M	Rushing	Jarrod Compton	24 rushes, 99 yards, 2 TD
West Texas A&M	Receiving	Noah Bogardus	8 receptions, 88 yards
Midwestern State	Passing	Neiko Hollins	14/31, 201 yards, TD, 2 INT
Midwestern State	Rushing	Trenton Kennedy	15 rushes, 103 yards, TD
Midwestern State	Receiving	Jayden Moore	6 receptions, 72 yards

=== At Western Oregon ===
	1	2	3	4	Total
Buffaloes	0	6	7	0	13
Wolves	7	0	3	17	27

Statistics	WT	WOU
First downs	21	18
Total yards	347	417
Rushing yards	105	195
Passing yards	242	222
Turnovers	2	2
Time of possession	32:03	27:57

Team	Category	Player	Statistics
West Texas A&M	Passing	Nick Gerber	32/51, 242 yards, 2 INT
West Texas A&M	Rushing	Brian Okoye	12 rushes, 65 yards
West Texas A&M	Receiving	Noah Bogardus	6 receptions, 81 yards
Western Oregon	Passing	Gannon Winker	15/38, 222 yards, 2 INT
Western Oregon	Rushing	Andrew Valladares	6 rushes, 98 yards, TD
Western Oregon	Receiving	Damon Hickok	7 receptions, 132 yards

=== Central Washington ===
	1	2	3	4	Total
Wildcats	0	0	3	13	16
Buffaloes	14	14	7	0	35

Statistics	CWU	WT
First downs	15	25
Total yards	262	301
Rushing yards	117	165
Passing yards	145	136
Turnovers	2	1
Time of possession	26:49	33:11

Team	Category	Player	Statistics
Central Washington	Passing	J. J. Lemming	13/38, 126 yards
Central Washington	Rushing	Tre'Jon Henderson	21 rushes, 75 yards, 2 TD
Central Washington	Receiving	Demonte Horton	4 receptions, 38 yards
West Texas A&M	Passing	Nick Gerber	12/19, 128 yards, 2 TD
West Texas A&M	Rushing	Brian Okoye	24 rushes, 83 yards, TD
West Texas A&M	Receiving	Noah Bogardus	2 receptions, 42 yards

=== At Western New Mexico ===
	1	2	3	4	Total
Buffaloes	3	17	7	10	37
Mustangs	7	13	14	7	41

Statistics	WT	WNM
First downs	25	27
Total yards	511	525
Rushing yards	175	92
Passing yards	336	433
Turnovers	2	1
Time of possession	24:13	35:47

Team	Category	Player	Statistics
West Texas A&M	Passing	Nick Gerber	18/28, 336 yards, 3 TD
West Texas A&M	Rushing	Nick Gerber	5 rushes, 57 yards, TD
West Texas A&M	Receiving	Noah Bogardus	3 receptions, 86 yards, TD
Western New Mexico	Passing	Devin Larsen	29/42, 433 yards, 2 TD
Western New Mexico	Rushing	Maurice Smith	10 rushes, 39 yards, TD
Western New Mexico	Receiving	Vincent Rankin	3 receptions, 98 yards, TD

=== Eastern New Mexico ===
	1	2	3	4	Total
Greyhounds	0	3	7	14	24
Buffaloes	0	7	7	7	21

Statistics	ENM	WT
First downs	24	22
Total yards	408	396
Rushing yards	146	227
Passing yards	262	169
Turnovers	1	2
Time of possession	35:24	24:36

Team	Category	Player	Statistics
Eastern New Mexico	Passing	Kason Martin	25/38, 262 yards, 2 TD, INT
Eastern New Mexico	Rushing	Kiante Stoker	13 rushes, 49 yards, TD
Eastern New Mexico	Receiving	Asa Wondeh	15 receptions, 147 yards, TD
West Texas A&M	Passing	Nick Gerber	16/29, 169 yards, TD, 2 INT
West Texas A&M	Rushing	Nick Gerber	11 rushes, 78 yards
West Texas A&M	Receiving	Hunter Kaufman	3 receptions, 58 yards

=== At Simon Fraser ===
	1	2	3	4	Total
Buffaloes	7	0	0	7	14
Red Leafs	10	22	14	0	46

Statistics	WT	SFU
First downs	19	25
Total yards	197	465
Rushing yards	64	115
Passing yards	133	350
Turnovers	2	0
Time of possession	21:16	38:44

Team	Category	Player	Statistics
West Texas A&M	Passing	Nick Gerber	13/23, 98 yards
West Texas A&M	Rushing	Jarrod Compton	6 rushes, 45 yards, TD
West Texas A&M	Receiving	Noah Bogardus	5 receptions, 37 yards
Simon Fraser	Passing	Justin Seiber	24/34, 293 yards, 5 TD
Simon Fraser	Rushing	Somto Anyadike	19 rushes, 82 yards, TD
Simon Fraser	Receiving	Sam Davenport	7 receptions, 156 yards, TD
