= 2022 NCAA Division II football rankings =

Rankings for the 2022 NCAA Division II football season

- Season: 2022
- Postseason: Single-elimination
- Preseason No. 1: Ferris State
- National champions: Ferris State

The 2022 National Collegiate Athletic Association (NCAA) Division II football rankings consists primarily of The AFCA Coaches' Poll, determined by coaches part of NCAA Division II football programs. The following weekly polls determine the top 25 teams at the NCAA Division II level of college football for the 2022 season.

== Legend ==
	Increase in ranking
	Decrease in ranking
	Not ranked previous week or no change
	Selected for College Football Playoff
(#–#)	Win–loss record
(Italics)	Number of first place votes
т	Tied with team above or below also with this symbol

== American Football Coaches Association (AFCA) poll ==
	Preseason Aug 8	Week 1 Sep 6	Week 2 Sep 12	Week 3 Sep 19	Week 4 Sep 26	Week 5 Oct 3	Week 6 Oct 10	Week 7 Oct 17	Week 8 Oct 24	Week 9 Oct 31	Week 10 Nov 7	Week 11 Nov 14	Week 12 (Final) Dec 19	
1.	Ferris State (30)	Ferris State (1–0) (28)	Ferris State (2–0) (29)	Ferris State (2–0) (29)	Ferris State (3–0) (29)	Ferris State (4–0) (29)	Ferris State (5–0) (28)	Grand Valley State (7–0) (29)	Grand Valley State (8–0) (28)	Grand Valley State (9–0) (28)	Grand Valley State (10–0) (28)	Grand Valley State (11–0) (27)	Ferris State (14–1) (28)	1.
2.	NW Missouri State	NW Missouri State (1–0)	NW Missouri State (2–0)	NW Missouri State (3–0)	Grand Valley State (4–0) (1)	Grand Valley State (5–0) (1)	Grand Valley State (6–0) (2)	Angelo State (7–0) (1)	Angelo State (8–0) (2)	Angelo State (9–0) (2)	Angelo State (10–0) (2)	Angelo State (11–0) (3)	Colorado Mines (13–3)	2.
3.	Valdosta State	Valdosta State (1–0)	Grand Valley State (2–0) (1)	Grand Valley State (3–0) (1)	Angelo State (4–0)	Angelo State (5–0)	Angelo State (6–0)	Shepherd (7–0)	Shepherd (8–0)	Shepherd (9–0)	Shepherd (10–0)	Ouachita Baptist (11–0)	Grand Valley State (12–1)	3.
4.	Colorado Mines	Grand Valley State (1–0) (1)	Shepherd (2–0)	Angelo State (3–0)	Shepherd (4–0)	Shepherd (5–0)	Shepherd (6–0)	Ouachita Baptist (7–0)	Ouachita Baptist (8–0)	Ouachita Baptist (9–0)	Ouachita Baptist (10–0)	Pittsburg State (11–0)	West Florida (12–2)	4.
5.	Grand Valley State	Shepherd (1–0)	Angelo State (2–0)	Shepherd (3–0)	West Georgia (3–0)	Ouachita Baptist (5–0)	Ouachita Baptist (6–0)	Pittsburg State (7–0)	Pittsburg State (8–0)	Pittsburg State (9–0)	Pittsburg State (10–0)	Ferris State (9–1)	Pittsburg State (12–1)	5.
6.	Shepherd	Angelo State (1–0)	West Florida (2–0)	West Florida (2–0)	Ouachita Baptist (4–0)	Ashland (4–0)	Ashland (5–0)	Ashland (6–0)	Ashland (7–0)	Delta State (9–0)	Ferris State (8–1)	West Florida (9–1)	Shepherd (13–2)	6.
7.	Angelo State	West Florida (1–0)	Harding (2–0)	Harding (3–0)	Newberry (4–0)	Pittsburg State (5–0)	Pittsburg State (6–0)	Ferris State (5–1)	Ferris State (6–1)	Ferris State (7–1)	West Florida (8–1)	Benedict (11–0)	Angelo State (12–1)	7.
8.	Bowie State	Harding (1–0)	West Georgia (2–0)	West Georgia (2–0)	Slippery Rock (4–0)	Indianapolis (4–0)	Indianapolis (5–0)	Delta State (7–0)	Delta State (8–0)	West Florida (7–1)	Benedict (10–0)	NW Missouri State (9–2)	NW Missouri State (10–3)	8.
9.	Harding	Bowie State (1–0)	Newberry (2–0)	Ouachita Baptist (3–0)	Ashland (3–0)	NW Missouri State (4–1)	West Florida (4–1)	West Florida (5–1)	West Florida (6–1)	Benedict (9–0)	Slippery Rock (9–1)	Delta State (10–1)	Delta State (11–2)	9.
10.	Notre Dame (OH)	West Georgia (1–0)	Ouachita Baptist (2–0)	Newberry (3–0)	Pittsburg State (4–0)	West Florida (3–1)	Delta State (6–0)	Virginia Union (7–0)	Virginia Union (8–0)	Slippery Rock (8–1)	NW Missouri State (8–2)	Colorado Mines (9–2)	Ouachita Baptist (11–1)	10.
11.	West Florida	Nebraska–Kearney (1–0)	Slippery Rock (2–0)	Slippery Rock (3–0)	Augustana (SD) (4–0)	Harding (4–1)	Virginia Union (6–0)	Sioux Falls (7–0)	IUP (7–0)	NW Missouri State (7–2)	Colorado Mines (8–2)	Shepherd (10–1)	IUP (10–2)	11.
12.	West Georgia	Colorado Mines (0–1)	Ashland (2–0)	Ashland (2–0)	NW Missouri State (3–1)	Virginia Union (5–0)	Harding (5–1)	Lenoir–Rhyne (6–1)	Newberry (7–1)	Colorado Mines (7–2)	Delta State (9–1)	Ashland (9–1)	Benedict (11–1)	12.
13.	Kutztown	Newberry (1–0)	Augustana (SD) (2–0)	Augustana (SD) (3–0)	Valdosta State (3–1)	Delta State (5–0)	Lenoir–Rhyne (5–1)	IUP (6–0)	NW Missouri State (6–2) т	Davenport (8–0)	Ashland (8–1)	Indianapolis (9–1)	Ashland (10–2)	13.
14.	Nebraska–Kearney	Lenoir–Rhyne (1–0)	West Texas A&M (2–0)	Pittsburg State (3–0)	Indianapolis (3–0) т	Lenoir–Rhyne (4–1)	Sioux Falls (6–0)	NW Missouri State (5–2)	Slippery Rock (7–1) т	Ashland (7–1)	Indianapolis (8–1)	Virginia Union (9–1)	Minnesota State (10–3)	14.
15.	Newberry	Albany State (1–0)	Valdosta State (1–1)	Valdosta State (2–1)	West Florida (2–1) т	West Georgia (3–1)	IUP (5–0)	Texas A&M–Kingsville (7–0)	Benedict (8–0)	Indianapolis (7–1)	Virginia Union (9–1)	IUP (9–1)	Wingate (11–3)	15.
16.	New Haven	Ouachita Baptist (1–0)	Pittsburg State (2–0)	Indianapolis (2–0)	Harding (3–1)	Notre Dame (OH) (4–1)	NW Missouri State (4–2)	Newberry (6–1)	Colorado Mines (6–2)	Virginia Union (8–1)	West Georgia (7–2)	West Georgia (8–2)	Slippery Rock (10–3)	16.
17.	Western Colorado	California (PA) (1–0)	Notre Dame (OH) (1–1)	Notre Dame (OH) (2–1)	Saginaw Valley State (4–0)	Sioux Falls (5–0)	Newberry (5–1)	Slippery Rock (6–1)	Indianapolis (6–1)	Harding (7–2) т	Harding (8–2)	Harding (9–2)	Indianapolis (9–2)	17.
18.	Albany State	Slippery Rock (1–0)	Lenoir–Rhyne (1–1)	Lenoir–Rhyne (2–1)	Notre Dame (OH) (3–1)	IUP (4–0)	Slippery Rock (5–1)	Benedict (7–0) т	Davenport (7–0)	IUP (7–1) т	Davenport (8–1)	Newberry (9–2)	Virginia Union (9–2)	18.
19.	Lenoir–Rhyne т	Augustana (SD) (1–0)	Indianapolis (1–0)	Saginaw Valley State (3–0)	Lenoir–Rhyne (3–1)	Newberry (4–1)	Colorado Mines (4–2)	Colorado Mines (7–0) т	Sioux Falls (7–1)	West Georgia (6–2)	IUP (8–1)	Minnesota State (9–2)	West Georgia (8–2)	19.
20.	Ouachita Baptist т	Ashland (1–0)	Bowie State (1–1)	Albany State (2–1)	Virginia Union (4–0)	Slippery Rock (4–1)	Texas A&M–Kingsville (6–0)	Indianapolis (5–1)	Texas A&M–Kingsville (7–1)	Wingate (8–1)	Truman State (8–1)	Slippery Rock (9–2)	Davenport (8–3)	20.
21.	California (PA)	CSU Pueblo (1–0) т	Albany State (1–1) т	Colorado Mines (1–2)	Albany State (3–1)	Colorado Mines (3–2)	Albany State (5–1)	Augustana (SD) (6–1)	Harding (6–2)	Truman State (7–1)	Newberry (8–2)	Davenport (8–2)	Newberry (9–2)	21.
22.	Bemidji State	Notre Dame (OH) (0–1) т	Colorado Mines (0–2) т	Virginia Union (3–0)	Colorado Mines (2–2)	Albany State (4–1) т	Nebraska–Kearney (5–1)	Davenport (6–0)	Lenoir–Rhyne (6–2)	Newberry (7–2)	Emporia State (8–2)	Wingate (9–2)	Harding (9–2)	22.
23.	Slippery Rock	West Texas A&M (1–0)	Saginaw Valley State (2–0)	New Haven (2–1)	Nebraska–Kearney (3–1)	Texas A&M–Kingsville (5–0) т	Benedict (6–0)	Harding (5–2)	Saginaw Valley State (6–2)	Emporia State (7–2)	Minnesota State (8–2)	Truman State (8–2)	Notre Dame (OH) (9–3)	23.
24.	Midwestern State	New Haven (0–1)	Minnesota State (2–0)	Henderson State (3–0)	New Haven (3–1)	Nebraska–Kearney (4–1)	Augustana (SD) (4–2)	Saginaw Valley State (5–2)	West Georgia (5–2)	Minnesota State (7–2)	Henderson State 8–2)	Emporia State (8–3) т	Bemidji State (10–3)	24.
25.	Augustana (SD)	Indianapolis (1–0)	New Haven (1–1)	Nebraska–Kearney (2–1)	Delta State (4–0)	Saginaw Valley State (4–1)	West Georgia (3–2)	West Georgia (4–2)	New Haven (6–1)	Sioux Falls (7–2)	Winona State (8–2)	Notre Dame (OH) т	Truman State (9–2)	25.
	Preseason Aug 8	Week 1 Sep 6	Week 2 Sep 12	Week 3 Sep 19	Week 4 Sep 26	Week 5 Oct 3	Week 6 Oct 10	Week 7 Oct 17	Week 8 Oct 24	Week 9 Oct 31	Week 10 Nov 7	Week 11 Nov 14	Week 12 (Final) Dec 19	
		Dropped: Kutztown; Western Colorado; Bemidji State; Midwestern State	Dropped: Nebraska–Kearney; California (PA); CSU Pueblo	Dropped: West Texas A&M; Bowie State; Minnesota State	Dropped: Henderson State	Dropped: Augustana (SD); Valdosta State; New Haven	Dropped: Notre Dame (OH); Saginaw Valley State	Dropped: Albany State; Nebraska–Kearney	Dropped: Augustana (SD)	Dropped: Texas A&M–Kingsville; Lenoir–Rhyne; Saginaw Valley State; New Haven	Dropped: Wingate; Sioux Falls	Dropped: Henderson State; Winona State	Dropped: Emporia State	
