= 2022 Great Lakes Intercollegiate Athletic Conference football season =

- Sport: Football
- Teams: 7
- Champion: Grand Valley State
- Season MVP: Caleb Murphy

Football seasons
- 2021 2023

2022 Great Lakes Intercollegiate Athletic Conference football standings
	Conf.			Overall
Team	W		L	W		L
No. 3 Grand Valley State $^	6	–	0	12	–	1
No. 1 Ferris State ^	5	–	1	14	–	1
No. 20 Davenport ^	4	–	2	8	–	3
Saginaw Valley State	3	–	3	8	–	3
Michigan Tech	2	–	4	4	–	7
Northern Michigan	1	–	5	4	–	7
Wayne State (MI)	0	–	6	1	–	9
$ – Conference champion; ^ – NCAA Division II playoff participant; Rankings from AFCA Poll

The 2022 Great Lakes Intercollegiate Athletic Conference football season was the season of college football played by the seven member schools of the Great Lakes Intercollegiate Athletic Conference (GLIAC) as part of the 2022 NCAA Division II football season.

Grand Valley State compiled a perfect 11–0 regular-season record, won the GLIAC championship, and was ranked No. 3 in the final NCAA Division II poll. The team advanced to the NCAA Division II playoffs where they lost in the second round to Ferris State. Grand Valley State defensive back Caleb Murphy won GLIAC Player of the Year honors.

Ferris State compiled a 10–1 record in the regular season, losing a close game to Grand Valley State. The Bulldogs later defeated Grand Valley State when they met for a second time at the Super Regional Final stage of the NCAA Division II playoffs. Ferris went on to win the 2022 NCAA Division II Football Championship Game on December 17, 2022, and finished the season with a 14–1 overall record. Ferris State quarterback Cade Peterson won GLIAC Offensive Back of the Year honors.

Davenport compiled an 8–3 record and was the third GLIAC team to advance to the Division II playoffs, losing to Ferris State in the first round. Davenport head coach Sparky McEwen won GLIAC Coach of the Year honors.

== Conference overview ==
Conf. rank	Team	Head coach	Overall record	Conf. record	Points scored	Points against
1	Grand Valley State	Matt Mitchell	12–1	6–0	240	62
2	Ferris State	Tony Annese	13–1	5–1	206	111
3	Davenport	Sparky McEwen	8–3	4–2	169	210
4	Saginaw Valley	Ryan Brady	8–3	3–3	152	156
5	Michigan Tech	Steve Olson	4–7	2–4	151	198
6	Northern Michigan	Kyle Nystrom	4–7	1–5	112	220
7	Wayne State	Paul Winters	1–9	0–6	149	222

== All-GLIAC honors ==
=== Players of the year honors ===
On November 17, 2022, the conference coaches selected the following players for player of the year honors:

- Player of the Year - Caleb Murphy, defensive end, Ferris State
- Offensive Back of the Year - Cade Peterson, quarterback, Grand Valley State
- Offensive Lineman of the Year - Quinton Barrow, offensive tackle, Grand Valley State
- Defensive Lineman of the Year - Christian McCarroll, defensive end, Grand Valley State
- Defensive Back of the Year - Abe Swanson, linebacker, Grand Valley State
- Freshman of the Year - Carson Gulker, quarterback, Ferris State
- Coach of the Year - Sparky McEwen, Davenport

=== All-GLIAC teams ===
The coaches also named the following players as first-team players on the 2022 All-GLIAC football team:

Offense

- Quarterback - Cade Peterson, Grand Valley State
- Running backs - Tariq Reid, Grand Valley State; Tyshon King, Northern Michigan; Kendall Wiliams, Wayne State
- Halfback - CJ Jefferson, Ferris State
- Wide receivers - Jahdae Walker, Grand Valley State; Tyrese Hunt-Thompson, Ferris State; Sy Barnett, Davenport; Darius Willis, Michigan Tech
- Offensive linemen - Quinton Barrow, Grand Valley State; Adam Sieler, Ferris State; Hayden Huttula, Michigan Tecch; Jordan Davis, Grand Valley State; Garrett Carroll, Grand Valley State; Blake Bustard, Wayne State
- Place kicker - Brandon Gielow, Davenport

Defense

- Defensive linemen - Caleb Murphy, Ferris State; Christian McCarroll, Grand Valley State; Jordan Jones, Ferris State; Victor Nelson, Saginaw Valley State; Austin Alward, Davenport
- Linebackers - Abe Swanson, Grand Valley State; Trevor Nowaske, Saginaw Valley State; Marc Sippel, Michigan Tech; Konnor Near, Ferris State; Damon Wesley, Grand Valley State
- Defensive backs - Nick Whiteside, Saginaw Valley State; Sidney McCloud, Ferris State; Shaq Floyd, Davenport; Nyzier Fourqurean, Grand Valley State; Cyntell Williams, Ferris State
- SP - Marcus Taylor, Ferris State
- Punter - Trace Hrgich, Grand Valley State

== Teams ==
=== Grand Valley State ===
2022 Grand Valley State Lakers football

GLIAC champion

NCAA Division II Quarterfinal, L 21–24 vs. Ferris State
- Conference: Great Lakes Intercollegiate Athletic Conference

Ranking
- AFCA: No. 3
- Record: 12–1 (6–0 GLIAC)
- Head coach: Matt Mitchell (12th season)
- Offensive coordinator: Matt Vitzthum (3rd season)
- Defensive coordinator: Jim Louis (10th season)

The 2022 Grand Valley State Lakers football team represented Grand Valley State University as a member of the Great Lakes Intercollegiate Athletic Conference (GLIAC) during the 2022 NCAA Division II football season. In their 12th year under head coach Matt Mitchell, the Lakers compiled a 12–1 record (6–0 against conference opponents), won the GLIAC championship, and were ranked No. 1 nationally at the end of the regular season. The Lakers would defeat five ranked teams during the regular season, including a 25–22 victory over No. 4 Colorado Mines in the season opener and rivalry game victories over No. 1 Ferris State and No. 17 Saginaw Valley State.

In the playoffs, the Lakers received a bye in the first round and won in the second round, before losing in the quarterfinals against rival Ferris State.

=== Ferris State ===
2022 Ferris State Bulldogs football

NCAA Division II national champion

NCAA Division II Championship Game, W 41–14 vs. Colorado Mines
- Conference: Great Lakes Intercollegiate Athletic Conference

Ranking
- AFCA: No. 1
- Record: 14–1 (5–1 GLIAC)
- Head coach: Tony Annese (11th season)
- Offensive coordinator: Steve Annese (11th season)
- Defensive coordinator: Ryan Hodges (8th season)
- Home stadium: Top Taggart Field

The 2022 Ferris State Bulldogs football team represented Ferris State University as a member of the Great Lakes Intercollegiate Athletic Conference (GLIAC) during the 2022 NCAA Division II football season. Led by 11th-year head coach Tony Annese, the Bulldogs compiled an overall record of 14–1 with a mark of 5–1 in conference play, placing second in the GLIAC. Ferris State received an at-large bid for the NCAA Division II Football Championship playoffs, beating Davenport in the first round, Pittsburg State in the second round, Grand Valley State in the quarterfinals, West Florida in the semifinals, Colorado Mines in the NCAA Division II Championship Game to repeat as NCAA Division II champions. The team played home games at Top Taggart Field in Big Rapids, Michigan.

==== Schedule ====
Date	Opponent	Rank	Site	Result	Attendance	Source
September 1	Central Washington*	No. 1	Top Taggart Field; Big Rapids, MI	W 36–20	7,101	
September 10	at Lenoir–Rhyne*	No. 1	Moretz Stadium; Hickory, NC	W 27–5	2,094	
September 24	Waldorf*^{†}	No. 1	Top Taggart Field; Big Rapids, MI	W 69–3	5,093	
October 1	at Findlay*	No. 1	Donnell Stadium; Findlay, OH	W 38–7	728	
October 8	at Saginaw Valley State	No. 1	Harvey Randall Wickes Memorial Stadium; Kochville, MI	W 33–28	3,627	
October 15	No. 2 Grand Valley State	No. 1	Top Taggart Field; Big Rapids, MI (Anchor-Bone Classic)	L 21–22	12,661	
October 22	Michigan Tech	No. 7	Top Taggart Field; Big Rapids, MI	W 28–20	4,914	
October 29	at Northern Michigan	No. 7	Superior Dome; Marquette, MI	W 56–20	1,769	
November 5	Davenport	No. 7	Top Taggart Field; Big Rapids, MI	W 28–7	3,600	
November 12	at Wayne State	No. 6	Tom Adams Field; Detroit, MI	W 40–14	1,675	
November 19	No. 21 Davenport*	No. 5	Top Taggart Field; Big Rapids, MI (NCAA Division II first round)	W 41–7	1,107	
November 26	No. 4 Pittsburg State*	No. 5	Top Taggart Field; Big Rapids, MI (NCAA Division II second round)	W 17–14	2,312	
December 3	at No. 1 Grand Valley State*	No. 5	Lubbers Stadium; Allendale, MI (NCAA Division II quarterfinal)	W 24–21	13,001	
December 10	No. 6 West Florida*	No. 5	Top Taggart Field; Big Rapids, MI (NCAA Division II semifinal)	W 38–17	5,105	
December 17	vs. No. 10 Colorado Mines*	No. 5	McKinney ISD Stadium; McKinney, TX (NCAA Division II Championship Game)	W 41–14	6,333	
*Non-conference game; ^{†}Homecoming; Rankings from AFCA Poll released prior to the game

=== Davenport ===
2022 Davenport Panthers football

NCAA Division II first round, L 7–41 vs. Ferris State
- Conference: Great Lakes Intercollegiate Athletic Conference

Ranking
- AFCA: No. 20
- Record: 8–3 (4–2 GLIAC)
- Head coach: Sparky McEwen (6th season)
- Offensive coordinator: Devin Russell (2nd season)
- Defensive coordinator: Adrian McEwen (6th season)

The 2022 Davenport Panthers football team represented Davenport University of Caledonia Township, Kent County, Michigan in the GLIAC during the 2022 NCAA Division II season. In their sixth year under head coach Sparky McEwen, the Panthers compiled an 8–3 record (4–2 against conference opponents), were ranked No. 21 in the final Division II poll, and finished third in the GLIAC. They advanced to the Division II playoffs where they lost to Ferris State in the first round.

==== Schedule ====
Date	Opponent	Rank	Site	Result	Attendance	Source
September 3	at Truman State*		Stokes Stadium; Kirksville, MO	W 20–19	2,800	
September 17	Northern Michigan		Farmers Insurance Complex; Caledonia, MI	W 31–21	1,366	
September 24	Northwood*^{†}		Farmers Insurance Complex; Caledonia, MI	W 51–17	1,822	
October 1	Michigan Tech		Farmers Insurance Complex; Caledonia, MI	W 52–38	1,622	
October 8	at Northern Michigan		Superior Dome; Marquette, MI	W 27–24 ^{OT}	1,143	
October 15	Wayne State		Farmers Insurance Complex; Caledonia, MI	W 47–43	1,277	
October 22	Lincoln (CA)*	No. 22	Farmers Insurance Complex; Caledonia, MI	W 58–14	1,300	
October 29	at No. 23 Saginaw Valley State	No. 18	Harvey Randall Wickes Memorial Stadium; Kochville, MI	W 29–28	1,920	
November 5	at No. 7 Ferris State	No. 13	Top Taggart Field; Big Rapids, MI	L 7–28	3,600	
November 12	No. 1 Grand Valley State	No. 18	Farmers Insurance Complex; Caledonia, MI	L 7–49	2,888	
November 19	at No. 5 Ferris State	No. 21	Top Taggart Field; Big Rapids, MI (NCAA Division II first round)	L 7–41	1,107	
*Non-conference game; ^{†}Homecoming; Rankings from AFCA Poll released prior to the game

=== Saginaw Valley State ===
2022 Saginaw Valley State Cardinals football
- Conference: Great Lakes Intercollegiate Athletic Conference
- Record: 8–3 (3–3 GLIAC)
- Head coach: Ryan Brady (3rd season)
- Offensive coordinator: Brett Ekkens (1st season)

The 2022 Saginaw Valley State Cardinals football team represented Saginaw Valley State University in the GLIAC during the 2022 NCAA Division II season. Under head coach Ryan Brady, the Cardinals compiled an 8–3 record (3–3 against conference opponents) and finished fourth in the GLIAC.

==== Schedule ====
Date	Opponent	Rank	Site	Result	Attendance	Source
September 1	West Virginia Wesleyan*		Harvey Randall Wickes Memorial Stadium; Kochville, MI	W 72–0	2,700	
September 10	Bowie State*		Harvey Randall Wickes Memorial Stadium; Kochville, MI	W 40–12	3,700	
September 17	at Northwood*		Hantz Stadium; Midland, MI	W 35–14	3,122	
September 24	at Michigan Tech*	No. 19	Kearly Stadium; Houghton, MI	W 35–13	1,284	
October 1	at Grand Valley State		Lubbers Stadium; Allendale, MI	L 10–29	14,877	
October 8	Ferris State		Harvey Randall Wickes Memorial Stadium; Kochville, MI	L 28–33	3,627	
October 15	Indianapolis*^{†}		Harvey Randall Wickes Memorial Stadium; Kochville, MI	W 38–14	3,101	
October 22	at Wayne State	No. 24	Tom Adams Field; Detroit, MI	W 21–14	3,531	
October 29	Davenport	No. 23	Harvey Randall Wickes Memorial Stadium; Kochville, MI	L 28–29	1,920	
November 5	at Northern Michigan		Superior Dome; Marquette, MI	W 30–21	1,198	
November 12	Michigan Tech		Harvey Randall Wickes Memorial Stadium; Kochville, MI	W 35–30	3,265	
*Non-conference game; ^{†}Homecoming; Rankings from AFCA Poll released prior to the game

=== Michigan Tech ===
2022 Michigan Tech Huskies football
- Conference: Great Lakes Intercollegiate Athletic Conference
- Record: 4–7 (2–4 GLIAC)
- Head coach: Steve Olson (6th season)
- Offensive coordinator: Dylan Chmura (1st season)
- Home stadium: Kearly Stadium

The 2022 Michigan Tech Huskies football team represented Michigan Tech University in the GLIAC during the 2022 NCAA Division II football season. Led by sixth-year head coach Steve Olson, the Huskies compiled a 4–7 record (2–4 in conference play), placing fifth in the GLIAC. Michigan Tech played home games at Kearly Stadium in Houghton, Michigan.

==== Schedule ====
Date	Time	Opponent	Site	TV	Result	Attendance
September 1	6:00 p.m.	UW Platteville*	Klearly Stadium; Houghton, MI	FloSports	W 23–13	1,933
September 10	2:00 p.m.	at St. Thomas (MN)*	O'Shaughnessy Stadium; Saint Paul, MN		L 6–32	4,768
September 17	8:00 p.m.	at Midwestern State*	Memorial Stadium; Wichita Falls, TX		L 21–28	6,222
September 24	1:00 p.m.	No. 19 Saginaw Valley State*	Klearly Stadium; Houghton, MI	FloSports	L 13–35	1,284
October 1	1:00 p.m.	at Davenport	The Farmers Insurance Athletic Complex; Caledonia, MI	FloSports	L 38–52	1,622
October 8	1:00 p.m.	Wayne State^{†}	Klearly Stadium; Houghton, MI	FloSports	W 35-34	2,291
October 15	1:00 p.m.	Northern Michigan	Klearly Stadium; Houghton, MI (Miner's Cup)	FloSports	W 21–7	1,629
October 22	1:00 p.m	at No. 7 Ferris State	Top Taggart Field; Big Rapids, MI	FloSports	L 20–28	4,914
October 29	1:00 p.m.	No. 1 Grand Valley State	Klearly Stadium; Houghton, MI	FloSports	L 7–42	1,512
November 5	1:00 p.m	at Hillsdale*	Frank Waters Stadium; Hillsdale, MI		W 28–24	1,407
November 12	1:00 p.m	at Saginaw Valley State	Harvey Randall Wickes Memorial Stadium; University Center, MI	FloSports	L 30–35	3,265
*Non-conference game; ^{†}Homecoming; Rankings from Coaches' Poll released prior to the game

=== Northern Michigan ===
2022 Northern Michigan Wildcats football
- Conference: Great Lakes Intercollegiate Athletic Conference
- Record: 4–7 (1–5 GLIAC)
- Head coach: Kyle Nystrom (5th season)
- Offensive coordinator: Dylan Chmura (2nd season)
- Defensive coordinator: Kirby Cannon (6th season)

The 2022 Northern Michigan Wildcats football team represented Northern Michigan University in the GLIAC during the 2022 NCAA Division II season. Under head coach Kyle Nystrom, the Wildcats compiled a 4–7 record (1–5 against conference opponents) and finished sixth in the GLIAC.

==== Schedule ====
Date	Opponent	Site	Result	Attendance	Source
September 1	McKendree*	Superior Dome; Marquette, MI	L 24–31 ^{OT}	1,200	
September 10	Wisconsin-Oshkosh*	Superior Dome; Marquette, MI	W 13–10	1,200	
September 17	at Davenport	Farmers Insurance Complex; Caledonia Township, MI	L 21–31	1,366	
September 24	Post*^{†}	Superior Dome; Marquette, MI	W 42–14	1,442	
October 1	at Wayne State	Tom Adams Field; Detroit, MI	W 37–30	4,187	
October 8	Davenport	Superior Dome; Marquette, MI	L 24–27 ^{OT}	1,143	
October 15	at Michigan Tech	Kearly Stadium; Houghton, MI (Miner's Cup)	L 7–21	1,629	
October 22	at No. 1 Grand Valley State	Lubbers Stadium; Allendale, MI	L 3–56	11,812	
October 29	Ferris State	Superior Dome; Marquette, MI	L 20–56	1,769	
November 5	Saginaw Valley State	Superior Dome; Marquette, MI	L 21–30	1,198	
November 12	at Lake Erie*	Jack Britt Memorial Stadium; Painesville, OH	W 33–11	331	
*Non-conference game; ^{†}Homecoming; Rankings from AFCA Poll released prior to the game

=== Wayne State ===
2022 Wayne State Warriors football
- Conference: Great Lakes Intercollegiate Athletic Conference
- Record: 1–9 (0–6 GLIAC)
- Head coach: Paul Winters (18th season)
- Offensive coordinator: Jeff Reardon (9th season)
- Defensive coordinator: Antwon Robinson (1st season)

The 2022 Wayne State Warriors football team represented Wayne State University in the GLIAC during the 2022 NCAA Division II season. The Warriors compiled a 1–9 record (0–6 against conference opponents) and finished last in the GLIAC.

==== Schedule ====
Date	Opponent	Site	Result	Attendance	Source
September 3	at No. 23 Slippery Rock*	Mihalik-Thompson Stadium; Slippery Rock PA	L 10–42	7,112	
September 10	Shaw*	Tom Adams Field; Detroit, MI	W 30–22	2,567	
September 17	No. 11 Wisconsin-La Crosse*	Tom Adams Field; Detroit, MI	L 21–28	1,982	
September 24	No. 3 Grand Valley State	Tom Adams Field; Detroit, MI	L 9–48	4,388	
October 1	Northern Michigan^{†}	Tom Adams Field; Detroit, MI	L 30–37	4,187	
October 8	at Michigan Tech	Sherman Field; Houghton, MI	L 34–35	2,291	
October 15	at No. 27 Davenport	Farmers Athletic Complex; Caledonia, MI	L 43–47	1,277	
October 22	No. 24 Saginaw Valley State	Tom Adams Field; Detroit, MI	L 14–21	3,531	
November 5	at No. 1 Grand Valley State	Lubbers Stadium; Allendale, MI	L 14–42	9,154	
November 12	No. 6 Ferris State	Tom Adams Field; Detroit, MI	L 14–40	1,675	
*Non-conference game; ^{†}Homecoming; Rankings from AFCA Poll released prior to the game
