= Wayne State Warriors football, 2020–present =

American college football season

2020–present Wayne State Warriors football
- Conference: Great Lakes Intercollegiate Athletic Conference
- Head coach: Paul Winters (2004–2022); Tyrone Wheatley (2023–present)
- Home stadium: Tom Adams Field

The Wayne State Warriors football program, 2020–present represented Wayne State University during the 2020s in NCAA Division II college football as a member of the Great Lakes Intercollegiate Athletic Conference (GLIAC). The team was led by two head coaches: Paul Winters who held the post from 2004 to 2022; and Tyrone Wheatley who took over as head coach in 2023.

The team played its home games at Tom Adams Field in Detroit. The field was named after Thomas B. Adams, a Wayne State football and track athlete who became a decorated naval aviator in World War II.

== 2020 ==
Wayne State and the GLIAC did not compete in football during the 2020 season due to the COVID-19 pandemic.

== 2021 ==
2021 Wayne State Warriors football
- Conference: Great Lakes Intercollegiate Athletic Conference
- Record: 2–9 (2–5 GLIAC)
- Head coach: Paul Winters (17th season)
- Home stadium: Tom Adams Field

2021 Great Lakes Intercollegiate Athletic Conference football standings
	Conf.			Overall
Team	W		L	W		L
No. 1 Ferris State $^	7	–	0	14	–	0
No. 7 Grand Valley State ^	6	–	1	10	–	2
Michigan Tech	5	–	2	6	–	4
Saginaw Valley State	4	–	3	7	–	4
Northern Michigan	2	–	5	4	–	7
Davenport	2	–	5	3	–	8
Wayne State (MI)	2	–	5	2	–	9
Northwood	0	–	7	1	–	9
$ – Conference champion; ^ – NCAA Division II playoff participant; Rankings from AFCA Poll

The 2021 Wayne State Warriors football team represented Wayne State University as a member of the Great Lakes Intercollegiate Athletic Conference (GLIAC) during the 2021 NCAA Division II football season. In their 17th season under head coach Paul Winters, the Warriors compiled a 2–9 record (2–5 in conference games), finished in a three-way tie for fifth place in the GLIAC, and were outscored by a total of 361 to 265.

=== Schedule ===
Date	Time	Opponent	Site	Result	Attendance	Source
September 2	6:00 p.m.	No. 5 Slippery Rock*	Tom Adams Field; Detroit, MI	L 21–24	2,431	
September 11	1:00 p.m.	Truman State*	Tom Adams Field; Detroit, MI	L 9–27	1,974	
September 18	2:00 p.m.	at Missouri S&T*	Allgood–Bailey Stadium; Rolla, MO	L 45–51 ^{OT}	1,516	
September 25	6:00 p.m.	Saginaw Valley State	Tom Adams Field; Detroit, MI	L 21–41	2,932	
October 2	4:00 p.m.	at Northern Michigan	Superior Dome; Marquette, MI	L 19–26	2,494	
October 9	6:00 p.m.	Michigan Tech^{†}	Tom Adams Field; Detroit, MI	L 27–30	3,674	
October 16	12:00 p.m.	at Davenport	Farmers Insurance Athletic Complex; Caledonia Township, MI	W 16–3	688	
October 23	3:00 p.m.	at Saginaw Valley State	Wickes Stadium; University Center, MI	L 25–41	4,200	
October 30	6:00 p.m.	Northwood	Tom Adams Field; Detroit, MI	W 56–21	1,945	
November 6	1:00 p.m.	No. 7 Grand Valley State	Tom Adams Field; Detroit, MI	L 13–62	2,436	
November 13	1:00 p.m.	at No. 1 Ferris State	Top Taggart Field; Big Rapids, MI	L 13–35	1,743	
*Non-conference game; ^{†}Homecoming; Rankings from AFCA Poll released prior to the game; All times are in Eastern time

== 2022 ==
2022 Wayne State Warriors football
- Conference: Great Lakes Intercollegiate Athletic Conference
- Record: 1–9 (0–6 GLIAC)
- Head coach: Paul Winters (18th season)
- Offensive coordinator: Jeff Reardon (9th season)
- Defensive coordinator: Antwon Robinson (1st season)

2022 Great Lakes Intercollegiate Athletic Conference football standings
	Conf.			Overall
Team	W		L	W		L
No. 3 Grand Valley State $^	6	–	0	12	–	1
No. 1 Ferris State ^	5	–	1	14	–	1
No. 20 Davenport ^	4	–	2	8	–	3
Saginaw Valley State	3	–	3	8	–	3
Michigan Tech	2	–	4	4	–	7
Northern Michigan	1	–	5	4	–	7
Wayne State (MI)	0	–	6	1	–	9
$ – Conference champion; ^ – NCAA Division II playoff participant; Rankings from AFCA Poll

The 2022 Wayne State Warriors football team represented Wayne State University as a member of the GLIAC during the 2022 NCAA Division II football season. In their 18th and final season under head coach Paul Winters, the Warriors compiled a 1–9 record (0–6 in conference games) and finished last in the GLIAC.

Winters stepped down as Wayne State's head coach after the 2022 season. He was 64 years old and had been a college football coach since 1982.

=== Schedule ===
Date	Time	Opponent	Site	TV	Result	Attendance	Source
September 3	6:00 p.m.	at No. 23 Slippery Rock*	Mihalik-Thompson Stadium; Slippery Rock PA		L 10–42	7,112	
September 10	6:00 p.m.	Shaw*	Tom Adams Field; Detroit, MI		W 30–22	2,567	
September 17	6:00 p.m.	No. 11 Wisconsin-La Crosse (DIII)*	Tom Adams Field; Detroit, MI		L 21–28	1,982	
September 24	6:00 p.m.	No. 3 Grand Valley State	Tom Adams Field; Detroit, MI		L 9–48	4,388	
October 1	6:00 p.m.	Northern Michigan^{†}	Tom Adams Field; Detroit, MI		L 30–37	4,187	
October 8	1:00 p.m.	at Michigan Tech	Sherman Field; Houghton, MI	FloSports	L 34–35	2,291	
October 15	12:00 p.m.	at No. 27 Davenport	Farmers Athletic Complex; Caledonia Township, MI		L 43–47	1,277	
October 22	6:00 p.m.	No. 24 Saginaw Valley State	Tom Adams Field; Detroit, MI		L 14–21	3,531	
November 5	1:00 p.m.	at No. 1 Grand Valley State	Lubbers Stadium; Allendale, MI	FloSports	L 14–42	9,154	
November 12	1:00 p.m.	No. 6 Ferris State	Tom Adams Field; Detroit, MI		L 14–40	1,675	
*Non-conference game; ^{†}Homecoming; Rankings from AFCA Poll released prior to the game; All times are in Eastern time

== 2023 ==
2023 Wayne State Warriors football
- Conference: Great Lakes Intercollegiate Athletic Conference
- Record: 3–8 (2–4 GLIAC)
- Head coach: Tyrone Wheatley (1st season)
- Home stadium: Tom Adams Field

2023 Great Lakes Intercollegiate Athletic Conference football standings
	Conf.			Overall
Team	W		L	W		L
No. 3 Grand Valley State $^	6	–	0	11	–	2
No. 9 Ferris State ^	5	–	1	8	–	3
Davenport	4	–	2	8	–	2
Saginaw Valley State	3	–	3	6	–	5
Wayne State (MI)	2	–	4	3	–	8
Michigan Tech	1	–	5	5	–	5
Northern Michigan	0	–	6	0	–	11
$ – Conference champion; ^ – NCAA Division II playoff participant; Rankings from AFCA Poll

The 2023 Wayne State Warriors football team represented Wayne State University as a member of the Great Lakes Intercollegiate Athletic Conference (GLIAC) during the 2023 NCAA Division II football season. In their first season under head coach Tyrone Wheatley, the Warriors compiled a 3–8 record (2–4 in conference games), finished in fifth place in the GLIAC, and were outscored by a total of 361 to 191.

The team's individual statistical leaders included Eli McLean (589 passing yards, 107.93 passer rating, 212 rushing yards), Jayden Waddell (423 passing yards, 129.66 passer rating, 329 rushing yards), Kendall Williams (538 rushing yards, four touchdowns), Te'Avion Warren (21 receptions for 292 yards), and Griffin Milovanski (66 points scored on 16 field goals and 18 extra points).

Wheatley, a former star running back at Michigan, was hired as the head coach in January 2023.

=== Schedule ===
Date	Time	Opponent	Site	TV	Result	Attendance	Source
September 2	6:00 p.m.	at No. 15 Slippery Rock*	Mihalik-Thompson Stadium; Slippery Rock, PA		L 17–28	6,611	
September 9	1:00 p.m.	Missouri S&T*	Tom Adams Field; Detroit, MI		W 31–24	2,231	
September 16	6:00 p.m.	at No. 18 Indianapolis*	Key Stadium; Indianapolis, IN		L 7–28	2,242	
September 23	1:00 p.m.	No. 28 Truman State*	Tom Adams Field; Detroit, MI		L 7–41	2,158	
September 30	6:00 p.m.	No. 15 (NAIA) Concordia (MI)*	Tom Adams Field; Detroit, MI		L 23–24	2,425	
October 7	1:00 p.m.	Michigan Tech^{†}	Tom Adams Field; Detroit, MI	FloSports	W 23–21	3,021	
October 14	6:00 p.m.	No. 16 Davenport	Tom Adams Field; Detroit, MI		L 3–32	1,738	
October 21	2:00 p.m.	at Saginaw Valley State	Wickes Stadium; University Center, MI		L 10–17 ^{OT}	3,079	
October 28	1:00 p.m.	at Northern Michigan	Superior Dome; Marquette, MI		W 41–17	2,881	
November 4	1:00 p.m.	No. 3 Grand Valley State	Tom Adams Field; Detroit, MI		L 10–66	2,158	
November 11	1:00 p.m.	at No. 6 Ferris State	Top Taggart Field; Big Rapids, MI	FloSports	L 19–63	2,155	
*Non-conference game; ^{†}Homecoming; Rankings from AFCA Poll released prior to the game; All times are in Eastern time

== 2024 ==
2024 Wayne State Warriors football
- Conference: Great Lakes Intercollegiate Athletic Conference
- Record: 2–9 (2–5 GLIAC)
- Head coach: Tyrone Wheatley (2nd season)
- Home stadium: Tom Adams Field

2024 Great Lakes Intercollegiate Athletic Conference football standings
	Conf.			Overall
Team	W		L	W		L
No. 1 Ferris State $^	7	–	0	14	–	1
No. 6 Grand Valley State ^	6	–	1	11	–	2
Davenport	4	–	3	7	–	4
Michigan Tech	4	–	3	7	–	4
Saginaw Valley State	4	–	3	7	–	4
Wayne State (MI)	2	–	5	2	–	9
Roosevelt*	1	–	6	1	–	9
Northern Michigan	0	–	7	0	–	11
$ – Conference champion; ^ – NCAA Division II playoff participant; * – Roosevelt ineligible for postseason play due to transition from NAIA; Rankings from AFCA poll

The 2024 Wayne State Warriors football team represented Wayne State University as a member of the Great Lakes Intercollegiate Athletic Conference (GLIAC) during the 2024 NCAA Division II football season. In their second season under head coach Tyrone Wheatley, the Warriors compiled a 2–9 record (2–5 in conference games), finished in sixth place in the GLIAC, and were outscored by a total of 342 to 223.

Sophomore quarterback Champion Edwards completed 74 of 137 passes (54.01%) for 899 yards, six touchdowns, eight interceptions, and a 111.91 passer rating. Edwards also led the team in rushing with 570 yards on 91 carries for an average of 6.3 yards per carry. The team's other statistical leaders included wide receiver Myles McKatherine (32 receptions for 514 yards) and kicker Griffin Milovanski (61 points on 12 field goals and 25 extra points).

=== Schedule ===
Date	Time	Opponent	Site	Result	Attendance	Source
September 5	6:00 p.m.	at Tiffin*	Frost-Kalnow Stadium; Tiffin, OH	L 17–31	2,950	
September 14	1:00 p.m.	Findlay*	Tom Adams Field; Detroit, MI	L 30–42	1,915	
September 21	6:00 p.m.	No. 16 Indianapolis*	Tom Adams Field; Detroit, MI	L 6–30	1,656	
September 28	1:00 p.m.	at Truman State*	Stokes Stadium; Kirksville, MO	L 17–31	2,343	
October 5	12:00 p.m.	at Michigan Tech	Sherman Field; Houghton, MI	L 7–22	1,974	
October 12	6:00 p.m.	No. 4 Ferris State	Tom Adams Field; Detroit, MI	L 14–27	2,121	
October 19	2:00 p.m.	at Davenport	Farmers Insurance Athletic Complex; Caledonia Township, MI	L 26–43	1,445	
October 26	1:00 p.m.	Saginaw Valley State^{†}	Tom Adams Field; Detroit, MI	L 10–37	2,726	
November 2	3:00 p.m.	at No. 7 Grand Valley State	Lubbers Stadium; Allendale, MI	L 28–51	10,377	
November 9	1:00 p.m.	Roosevelt	Tom Adams Field; Detroit, MI	W 38–14	1,323	
November 16	1:00 p.m.	Northern Michigan	Tom Adams Field; Detroit, MI	W 30–14	1,115	
*Non-conference game; ^{†}Homecoming; Rankings from AFCA Poll released prior to the game; All times are in Eastern time

== 2025 ==
2025 Wayne State Warriors football
- Conference: Great Lakes Intercollegiate Athletic Conference
- Record: 0–11 (0–7 GLIAC)
- Head coach: Tyrone Wheatley (3rd season)
- Home stadium: Tom Adams Field

2025 Great Lakes Intercollegiate Athletic Conference football standings
	Conf.			Overall
Team	W		L	W		L
No. 1 Ferris State $^	7	–	0	16	–	0
Grand Valley State	5	–	2	7	–	3
Saginaw Valley State	5	–	2	6	–	5
Michigan Tech	4	–	3	7	–	4
Davenport	4	–	3	5	–	5
Northern Michigan	2	–	5	3	–	8
Roosevelt*	1	–	6	2	–	8
Wayne State (MI)	0	–	7	0	–	11
$ – Conference champion; ^ – NCAA Division II playoff participant; * – Roosevelt ineligible for postseason play due to transition from NAIA; Rankings from AFCA poll

The 2025 Wayne State Warriors football team represents Wayne State University as a member of the Great Lakes Intercollegiate Athletic Conference (GLIAC) during the 2025 NCAA Division II football season. They are expected to be led by Tyrone Wheatley in his third year as head coach.

=== Schedule ===
Date	Time	Opponent	Site	TV	Result	Attendance	Source
September 4	6:00 p.m.	Tiffin*	Tom Adams Field; Detroit, MI	FloSports	L 7–34	2,324	
September 13	12:00 p.m.	at Findlay*	Donnell Stadium; Findlay, OH	FloSports	L 3–7	1,047	
September 20	2:00 p.m.	at Wisconsin–La Crosse*	Veterans Memorial Field Sports Complex; La Crosse, WI		L 22–31	2,803	
September 27	1:00 p.m.	Quincy*	Tom Adams Field; Detroit, MI	FloSports	L 14–31	1,305	
October 4	1:00 p.m.	Michigan Tech^{†}	Tom Adams Field; Detroit, MI	FloSports	L 24–48	1,932	
October 11	1:00 p.m.	at No. 1 Ferris State	Top Taggart Field; Big Rapids, MI	FloSports	L 0–59	3,124	
October 18	1:00 p.m.	Davenport	Tom Adams Field; Detroit, MI	FloSports	L 14–49	1,213	
October 25	2:00 p.m.	at Saginaw Valley State	Wickes Stadium; University Center, MI	FloSports	L 7–28	2,279	
November 1	1:00 p.m.	No. 25 Grand Valley State	Tom Adams Field; Detroit, MI	FloSports	L 13–59	1,451	
November 8	2:00 p.m.	at Roosevelt	Morris Field; Arlington Heights, IL	FloSports	L 14–48	822	
November 15	1:00 p.m.	at Northern Michigan	Superior Dome; Marquette, MI	FloSports	L 11–45	2,298	
*Non-conference game; ^{†}Homecoming; Rankings from AFCA Poll released prior to the game; All times are in Eastern time
