= Northern Michigan Wildcats football, 2020–present =

American college football season

2020–present Northern Michigan Wildcats football
- Conference: Great Lakes Intercollegiate Athletic Conference
- Head coach: Kyle Nystrom (2021–2022); Shane Richardson (2023–2025); Matt Janus (2026-present)

The Northern Michigan Wildcats football program, 2020–present represented Northern Michigan University during the 2010s in NCAA Division II college football as a member of the Great Lakes Intercollegiate Athletic Conference (GLIAC). The team was led during the decade by three head coaches: Kyle Nystrom (2021–2022), Shane Richardson (2023–2025), and Matt Janus (2026-present).

The Wildcats have not had a winning season since going 6–4 in 2009. In their first two seasons under Richardson, the Wildcats lost 22 consecutive games, compiling identical 0–11 records in 2023 and 2024 while being outscored by an average of 30.6 points per game during the two seasons.

The team played its home games at the Superior Dome in Marquette, Michigan.

== Decade overview ==
Year	Head coach	Overall record	Conf. record	Conf. rank	Points scored	Points allowed	Delta
2021	Kyle Nystrom	4–7	2–5	5 (tie)	233	288	-55
2022	Kyle Nystrom	4–7	1–5	6	245	317	-72
2023	Shane Richardson	0–11	0–6	7	144	538	-394
2024	Shane Richardson	0–11	0–7	8	172	451	-279
2025	Shane Richardson	3–8	2–5	6	296	407	-111
TOTAL		11–44	5–28		1,090	2,001	-911

== 2020 ==
Northern Michigan and the GLIAC did not compete in football during the 2020 season due to the COVID-19 pandemic.

== 2021 ==
2021 Northern Michigan Wildcats football
- Conference: Great Lakes Intercollegiate Athletic Conference
- Record: 4–7 (2–5 GLIAC)
- Head coach: Kyle Nystrom (4th season)
- Home stadium: Superior Dome

2021 Great Lakes Intercollegiate Athletic Conference football standings
	Conf.			Overall
Team	W		L	W		L
No. 1 Ferris State $^	7	–	0	14	–	0
No. 7 Grand Valley State ^	6	–	1	10	–	2
Michigan Tech	5	–	2	6	–	4
Saginaw Valley State	4	–	3	7	–	4
Northern Michigan	2	–	5	4	–	7
Davenport	2	–	5	3	–	8
Wayne State (MI)	2	–	5	2	–	9
Northwood	0	–	7	1	–	9
$ – Conference champion; ^ – NCAA Division II playoff participant; Rankings from AFCA Poll

The 2021 Northern Michigan Wildcats football team represented Northern Michigan University as a member of the Great Lakes Intercollegiate Athletic Conference (GLIAC) during the 2021 NCAA Division II football season. In their fourth year under head coach Kyle Nystrom, the Wildcats compiled a 4–7 record (2–5 in conference games), tied for fifth place in the GLIAC, and were outscored by a total of 288 to 233.

Quarterback Drake Davis tallied 1,401 passing yards and 340 rushing yards. Defensive lineman John McMullen tallied 45 tackles, including 10.5 tackles for loss and 6.5 sacks.

=== Schedule ===
Date	Time	Opponent	Site	TV	Result	Attendance	Source
September 4	2:00 p.m.	at McKendree*	Leemon Field; Lebanon, IL		W 27–20	1,200	
September 11	1:00 p.m.	Wisconsin–Oshkosh*	Superior Dome; Marquette, MI		L 10–28	1,956	
September 18	1:00 p.m.	Davenport*	Superior Dome; Marquette, MI		W 20–14	1,536	
September 25	1:00 p.m.	at Northwood*	Hantz Stadium; Midland, MI		L 20–37	1,946	
October 2	4:00 p.m.	Wayne State (MI)^{†}	Superior Dome; Marquette, MI		W 26–19	2,494	
October 9	12:00 p.m.	at Davenport	Farmers Insurance Athletic Complex; Caledonia Township, MI		L 13–18	1,202	
October 16	12:00 p.m.	Michigan Tech	Superior Dome; Marquette, MI (Miner's Cup)	WLUC	L 14–21	3,597	
October 23	1:00 p.m.	No. 8 Grand Valley State	Superior Dome; Marquette, MI		L 24–28	2,012	
October 30	1:00 p.m.	at No. 1 Ferris State	Top Taggart Field; Big Rapids, MI		L 24–44	2,460	
November 6	1:00 p.m.	at Saginaw Valley State	Wickes Stadium; University Center, MI		L 21–33	2,000	
November 13	1:00 p.m.	Northwood	Superior Dome; Marquette, MI		W 34–26	1,806	
*Non-conference game; ^{†}Homecoming; Rankings from AFCA Poll released prior to the game; All times are in Eastern time

== 2022 ==
2022 Northern Michigan Wildcats football
- Conference: Great Lakes Intercollegiate Athletic Conference
- Record: 4–7 (1–5 GLIAC)
- Head coach: Kyle Nystrom (5th season)
- Offensive coordinator: Dylan Chmura (2nd season)
- Defensive coordinator: Kirby Cannon (6th season)
- Home stadium: Superior Dome

2022 Great Lakes Intercollegiate Athletic Conference football standings
	Conf.			Overall
Team	W		L	W		L
No. 3 Grand Valley State $^	6	–	0	12	–	1
No. 1 Ferris State ^	5	–	1	14	–	1
No. 20 Davenport ^	4	–	2	8	–	3
Saginaw Valley State	3	–	3	8	–	3
Michigan Tech	2	–	4	4	–	7
Northern Michigan	1	–	5	4	–	7
Wayne State (MI)	0	–	6	1	–	9
$ – Conference champion; ^ – NCAA Division II playoff participant; Rankings from AFCA Poll

The 2022 Northern Michigan Wildcats football team represented Northern Michigan University in the GLIAC during the 2022 NCAA Division II season. In their fifth and final season uner head coach Kyle Nystrom, the Wildcats compiled a 4–7 record (1–5 in conference games) and finished sixth in the GLIAC.

=== Schedule ===
Date	Time	Opponent	Site	TV	Result	Attendance	Source
September 1	7:00 p.m.	McKendree*	Superior Dome; Marquette, MI		L 24–31 ^{OT}	1,200	
September 10	1:00 p.m.	Wisconsin–Oshkosh*	Superior Dome; Marquette, MI		W 13–10	1,200	
September 17	12:00 p.m.	at Davenport*	Farmers Insurance Complex; Caledonia Township, MI		L 21–31	1,366	
September 24	2:00 p.m.	Post*^{†}	Superior Dome; Marquette, MI		W 42–14	1,442	
October 1	6:00 p.m.	at Wayne State	Tom Adams Field; Detroit, MI		W 37–30	4,187	
October 8	1:00 p.m.	Davenport	Superior Dome; Marquette, MI		L 24–27 ^{OT}	1,143	
October 15	1:00 p.m.	at Michigan Tech	Kearly Stadium; Houghton, MI (Miner's Cup)	FloSports	L 7–21	1,629	
October 22	3:00 p.m.	at No. 1 Grand Valley State	Lubbers Stadium; Allendale, MI	FloSports	L 3–56	11,812	
October 29	1:00 p.m.	No. 7 Ferris State	Superior Dome; Marquette, MI		L 20–56	1,769	
November 5	1:00 p.m.	Saginaw Valley State	Superior Dome; Marquette, MI		L 21–30	1,198	
November 12	12:00 p.m.	at Lake Erie*	Jack Britt Memorial Stadium; Painesville, OH		W 33–11	331	
*Non-conference game; ^{†}Homecoming; Rankings from AFCA Poll released prior to the game; All times are in Eastern time

== 2023 ==
2023 Northern Michigan Wildcats football
- Conference: Great Lakes Intercollegiate Athletic Conference
- Record: 0–11 (0–6 GLIAC)
- Head coach: Shane Richardson (1st season)
- Home stadium: Superior Dome

2023 Great Lakes Intercollegiate Athletic Conference football standings
	Conf.			Overall
Team	W		L	W		L
No. 3 Grand Valley State $^	6	–	0	11	–	2
No. 9 Ferris State ^	5	–	1	8	–	3
Davenport	4	–	2	8	–	2
Saginaw Valley State	3	–	3	6	–	5
Wayne State (MI)	2	–	4	3	–	8
Michigan Tech	1	–	5	5	–	5
Northern Michigan	0	–	6	0	–	11
$ – Conference champion; ^ – NCAA Division II playoff participant; Rankings from AFCA poll

The 2023 Northern Michigan Wildcats football team represented Northern Michigan University as a member of the Great Lakes Intercollegiate Athletic Conference (GLIAC) during the 2023 NCAA Division II football season. In their fourth year under head coach Kyle Nystrom, the Wildcats compiled a 0–11 record (0–6 in conference games), finished in last place in the GLIAC, and were outscored by a total of 538 to 144. The season began a 28-game losing streak that continued into the 2025 season.

=== Schedule ===
Date	Time	Opponent	Site	TV	Result	Attendance	Source
August 31	7:00 p.m.	at Minnesota Duluth*	Malosky Stadium; Duluth, MN		L 10–47	3,308	
September 9	1:00 p.m.	Lake Erie*	Superior Dome; Marquette, MI		L 21–24	1,995	
September 16	2:00 p.m.	Wisconsin–La Crosse*^{†}	Superior Dome; Marquette, MI		L 3–34	2,874	
September 23	2:00 p.m.	at Quincy*	QU Stadium; Quincy, IL		L 27–45	462	
September 30	3:00 p.m.	at No. 1 Ferris State	Top Taggart Field; Big Rapids, MI	FloSports	L 3–78	5,642	
October 7	2:00 p.m.	at No. 16 Davenport	Farmers Insurance Athletic Complex; Caledonia Township, MI		L 12–28	1,666	
October 14	7:00 p.m.	Michigan Tech	Superior Dome; Marquette, MI (Miner's Cup)	FloSports/WLUC	L 0–62	5,907	
October 21	1:00 p.m.	No. 4 Grand Valley State	Superior Dome; Marquette, MI		L 14–73	3,447	
October 28	1:00 p.m.	Wayne State (MI)	Superior Dome; Marquette, MI		L 17–41	2,881	
November 4	1:00 p.m.	at Saginaw Valley State	Wickes Stadium; University Center, MI		L 17–62		
November 11	1:00 p.m.	Northern State*	Superior Dome; Marquette, MI		L 20–44	2,101	
*Non-conference game; ^{†}Homecoming; Rankings from AFCA Poll released prior to the game; All times are in Eastern time

== 2024 ==
2024 Northern Michigan Wildcats football
- Conference: Great Lakes Intercollegiate Athletic Conference
- Record: 0–11 (0–7 GLIAC)
- Head coach: Shane Richardson (2nd season)
- Home stadium: Superior Dome

2024 Great Lakes Intercollegiate Athletic Conference football standings
	Conf.			Overall
Team	W		L	W		L
No. 1 Ferris State $^	7	–	0	14	–	1
No. 6 Grand Valley State ^	6	–	1	11	–	2
Davenport	4	–	3	7	–	4
Michigan Tech	4	–	3	7	–	4
Saginaw Valley State	4	–	3	7	–	4
Wayne State (MI)	2	–	5	2	–	9
Roosevelt*	1	–	6	1	–	9
Northern Michigan	0	–	7	0	–	11
$ – Conference champion; ^ – NCAA Division II playoff participant; * – Roosevelt ineligible for postseason play due to transition from NAIA; Rankings from AFCA poll

The 2024 Northern Michigan Wildcats football team represented Northern Michigan University as a member of the Great Lakes Intercollegiate Athletic Conference (GLIAC) during the 2024 NCAA Division II football season. In their second year under head coach Shane Richardson, the Wildcats compiled a 0–11 record (0–7 in conference games), finished in last place in the GLIAC, and were outscored by a total of 451 to 172. The season was part of a 28-game losing streak that included the entire 2023 and 2024 seasons and continued into the first half of the 2025 season.

=== Schedule ===
Date	Time	Opponent	Site	TV	Result	Attendance	Source
August 29	6:00 p.m.	No. 17 Minnesota Duluth*	Superior Dome; Marquette, MI		L 7–35	2,142	
September 5	7:00 p.m.	at Kentucky Wesleyan*	Steele Stadium; Owensboro, KY		L 13–33		
September 14	2:00 p.m.	at No. 6 D-III Wisconsin–La Crosse*	Veterans Memorial Stadium; La Crosse, WI		L 21–35	3,110	
September 21	1:00 p.m.	Alma*^{†}	Superior Dome; Marquette, MI		L 27–44	3,409	
October 5	1:00 p.m.	Saginaw Valley State	Superior Dome; Marquette, MI		L 14–63	2,553	
October 12	7:00 p.m.	at No. 2 Grand Valley State	Lubbers Stadium; Allendale, MI		L 17–49	7,002	
October 19	1:00 p.m.	Roosevelt	Superior Dome; Marquette, MI		L 10–16 ^{OT}	2,261	
October 26	12:00 p.m.	at Michigan Tech	Kearly Stadium; Houghton, MI (Miner's Cup)	FloSports/WLUC	L 9–39	1,984	
November 2	1:00 p.m.	No. 2 Ferris State	Superior Dome; Marquette, MI		L 9–55	1,873	
November 9	12:00 p.m.	at Davenport	Farmers Insurance Athletic Complex; Caledonia Township, MI		L 31–52	1,203	
November 16	1:00 p.m.	at Wayne State (MI)	Tom Adams Field; Detroit, MI		L 14–30	1,115	
*Non-conference game; ^{†}Homecoming; Rankings from AFCA Poll released prior to the game; All times are in Eastern time

== 2025 ==
2025 Northern Michigan Wildcats football
- Conference: Great Lakes Intercollegiate Athletic Conference
- Record: 3–8 (2–5 GLIAC)
- Head coach: Shane Richardson (3rd season; first 9 games); Billy Lindquist (interim, remainder)
- Home stadium: Superior Dome

2025 Great Lakes Intercollegiate Athletic Conference football standings
	Conf.			Overall
Team	W		L	W		L
No. 1 Ferris State $^	7	–	0	16	–	0
Grand Valley State	5	–	2	7	–	3
Saginaw Valley State	5	–	2	6	–	5
Michigan Tech	4	–	3	7	–	4
Davenport	4	–	3	5	–	5
Northern Michigan	2	–	5	3	–	8
Roosevelt*	1	–	6	2	–	8
Wayne State (MI)	0	–	7	0	–	11
$ – Conference champion; ^ – NCAA Division II playoff participant; * – Roosevelt ineligible for postseason play due to transition from NAIA; Rankings from AFCA poll

The 2025 Northern Michigan Wildcats football team represents Northern Michigan University as a member of the Great Lakes Intercollegiate Athletic Conference (GLIAC) during the 2025 NCAA Division II football season. They were expected to be led by Shane Richardson before he resigned on November 7. The season was part of a 28-game losing streak that included the entire 2023 and 2024 seasons and continued until October 18.

In February 2023, quarterback Aidan Hoard, a 6'5" quarterback from Frankenmuth, committed to play for Northern Michigan. His father, Matt Hoard, previously played quarterback for the Wildcats and was named NCAA Division II Player of the Year.

=== Schedule ===
Date	Time	Opponent	Site	TV	Result	Attendance	Source
August 28	6:00 p.m.	Minnesota State Moorhead*	Superior Dome; Marquette, MI		L 37–44	2,021	
September 6	12:00 p.m.	at Northwood*	Hantz Stadium; Midland, MI		L 18–23	1,633	
September 13	1:00 p.m.	St. Thomas (MN)*	Superior Dome; Marquette, MI	FloSports	L 7–20	2,180	
September 20	1:00 p.m.	Davenport^{†}	Superior Dome; Marquette, MI	FloSports	L 16–35	2,680	
October 4	2:00 p.m.	at Saginaw Valley State	Wickes Stadium; University Center, MI		L 25–47	3,226	
October 11	7:00 p.m.	No. 8 Grand Valley State	Superior Dome; Marquette, MI	FloSports	L 7–35	3,216	
October 18	2:00 p.m.	at Roosevelt	Morris Field; Arlington Heights, IL	FloSports	W 42–21	749	
October 25	12:00 p.m.	Michigan Tech	Superior Dome; Marquette, MI (Miner's Cup)	FloSports	L 17–56	4,468	
November 1	1:00 p.m.	at No. 1 Ferris State	Top Taggart Field; Big Rapids, MI		L 35–70	2,843	
November 8	12:00 p.m.	at Davenport*	Farmers Insurance Athletic Complex; Caledonia Township, MI	FloSports	W 47–45 ^{4OT}	767	
November 15	1:00 p.m.	Wayne State (MI)	Superior Dome; Marquette, MI	FloSports	W 45–11	2,298	
*Non-conference game; ^{†}Homecoming; Rankings from AFCA Poll released prior to the game; All times are in Eastern time
