= Saginaw Valley State Cardinals football, 2020–present =

American college football season

2020–present Saginaw Valley State Cardinals football
- Conference: Great Lakes Intercollegiate Athletic Conference
- Head coach: Ryan Brady (2019–present)
- Home stadium: Harvey Randall Wickes Memorial Stadium

The Saginaw Valley State Cardinals football program, 2020–present represented Saginaw Valley State University during the 2020s in NCAA Division II college football as a member of the Great Lakes Intercollegiate Athletic Conference (GLIAC). The team was led during the decade by head coach Ryan Brady, who took over as head coach in 2019 and continues in the position as of 2025.

The team played its home games at Harvey Randall Wickes Memorial Stadium, commonly shortened to Wickes Stadium, in University Center, Michigan.

== Decade overview ==
Year	Head coach	Overall record	Conf. record	Conf. rank	Points scored	Points against
2021	Ryan Brady	7–4	4–3	302	245	+57
2022	Ryan Brady	8–3	3–3	372	209	+163
2023	Ryan Brady	6–5	3–3	283	263	+20
2024	Ryan Brady	7–4	4–3	322	189	+133
TOTAL		28–16	14–12			+373

== 2020 ==
Saginaw Valley State and the GLIAC did not compete in football during the 2020 season due to the COVID-19 pandemic.

== 2021 ==
2021 Saginaw Valley State Cardinals football
- Conference: Great Lakes Intercollegiate Athletic Conference
- Record: 7–4 (4–3 GLIAC)
- Head coach: Ryan Brady (2nd season)
- Home stadium: Harvey Randall Wickes Memorial Stadium

2021 Great Lakes Intercollegiate Athletic Conference football standings
	Conf.			Overall
Team	W		L	W		L
No. 1 Ferris State $^	7	–	0	14	–	0
No. 7 Grand Valley State ^	6	–	1	10	–	2
Michigan Tech	5	–	2	6	–	4
Saginaw Valley State	4	–	3	7	–	4
Northern Michigan	2	–	5	4	–	7
Davenport	2	–	5	3	–	8
Wayne State (MI)	2	–	5	2	–	9
Northwood	0	–	7	1	–	9
$ – Conference champion; ^ – NCAA Division II playoff participant; Rankings from AFCA Poll

The 2021 Saginaw Valley State Cardinals football team represented Saginaw Valley State University (SVSU) as a member of the Great Lakes Intercollegiate Athletic Conference (GLIAC) during the 2021 NCAA Division II football season. In their second year under head coach Ryan Brady, the Cardinals compiled a 7–4 record (4–3 in conference games), finished in fourth place in the GLIAC, and outscored opponents by a total of 302 to 245.

=== Schedule ===
Date	Time	Opponent	Site	Result	Attendance	Source
September 4	7:00 p.m.	Texas A&M–Kingsville*	Wickes Stadium; University Center, MI	W 13–9	2,000	
September 11	1:00 p.m.	at Bowie State*	Bulldogs Stadium; Bowie, MD	L 17–28	1,211	
September 18	7:00 p.m.	at No. 2 Ferris State	Top Taggart Field; Big Rapis, MI	L 45–47 ^{OT}	6,012	
September 25	6:00 p.m.	at Wayne State	Tom Adams Field; Detroit, MI	W 41–21	2,932	
October 2	2:00 p.m.	No. 8 Grand Valley State	Wickes Stadium; University Center, MI (Battle of the Valleys)	L 17–49	8,544	
October 9	5:00 p.m.	at Texas A&M–Commerce*	Ernest Hawkins Field at Memorial Stadium; Commerce, TX	W 20–17 ^{OT}	5,102	
October 16	2:00 p.m.	Northwood^{†}	Wickes Stadium; University Center, MI	W 31–13	5,100	
October 23	3:00 p.m.	Wayne State	Wickes Stadium; University Center, MI	W 41–25	4,200	
October 30	12:00 p.m.	at Davenport	Farmers Insurance Athletic Complex; Caledonia Township, MI	W 24–3	1,050	
November 6	1:00 p.m.	Northern Michigan	Wickes Stadium; University Center, MI	W 33–21	2,000	
November 13	1:00 p.m.	at Michigan Tech	Kearly Stadium; Houghton, MI	L 20–21	1,315	
*Non-conference game; ^{†}Homecoming; Rankings from AFCA Poll released prior to the game; All times are in Eastern time

== 2022 ==
2022 Saginaw Valley State Cardinals football
- Conference: Great Lakes Intercollegiate Athletic Conference
- Record: 8–3 (3–3 GLIAC)
- Head coach: Ryan Brady (3rd season)
- Home stadium: Harvey Randall Wickes Memorial Stadium

2022 Great Lakes Intercollegiate Athletic Conference football standings
	Conf.			Overall
Team	W		L	W		L
No. 3 Grand Valley State $^	6	–	0	12	–	1
No. 1 Ferris State ^	5	–	1	14	–	1
No. 20 Davenport ^	4	–	2	8	–	3
Saginaw Valley State	3	–	3	8	–	3
Michigan Tech	2	–	4	4	–	7
Northern Michigan	1	–	5	4	–	7
Wayne State (MI)	0	–	6	1	–	9
$ – Conference champion; ^ – NCAA Division II playoff participant; Rankings from AFCA Poll

The 2022 Saginaw Valley State Cardinals football team represented Saginaw Valley State University (SVSU) as a member of the Great Lakes Intercollegiate Athletic Conference (GLIAC) during the 2022 NCAA Division II football season. In their third year under head coach Ryan Brady, the Cardinals compiled an 8–3 record (3–3 in conference games), finished in fourth place in the GLIAC, and outscored opponents by a total of 372 to 209.

=== Schedule ===
Date	Time	Opponent	Rank	Site	TV	Result	Attendance	Source
September 1	6:00 p.m.	West Virginia Wesleyan*		Wickes Stadium; University Center, MI		W 72–0	2,700	
September 10	1:00 p.m.	Bowie State*		Wickes Stadium; University Center, MI		W 40–12	3,700	
September 17	1:00 p.m.	at Northwood*		Hantz Stadium; Midland, MI		W 35–14	3,122	
September 24	1:00 p.m.	at Michigan Tech*	No. 19	Kearly Stadium; Houghton, MI	FloSports	W 35–13	1,284	
October 1	7:00 p.m.	at No. 2 Grand Valley State	No. 17	Lubbers Stadium; Allendale, MI	FloSports	L 10–29	14,877	
October 8	2:00 p.m.	No. 1 Ferris State		Wickes Stadium; University Center, MI		L 28–33	3,627	
October 15	2:00 p.m.	Indianapolis*^{†}		Wickes Stadium; University Center, MI		W 38–14	3,101	
October 22	6:00 p.m.	at Wayne State	No. 24	Tom Adams Field; Detroit, MI		W 21–14	3,531	
October 29	1:00 p.m.	Davenport	No. 23	Wickes Stadium; University Center, MI		L 28–29	1,920	
November 5	1:00 p.m.	at Northern Michigan		Superior Dome; Marquette, MI		W 30–21	1,198	
November 12	1:00 p.m.	Michigan Tech		Wickes Stadium; University Center, MI	FloSports	W 35–30	3,265	
*Non-conference game; ^{†}Homecoming; Rankings from AFCA Poll released prior to the game; All times are in Eastern time

== 2023 ==
2023 Saginaw Valley State Cardinals football
- Conference: Great Lakes Intercollegiate Athletic Conference
- Record: 6–5 (3–3 GLIAC)
- Head coach: Ryan Brady (4th season)
- Home stadium: Harvey Randall Wickes Memorial Stadium

2023 Great Lakes Intercollegiate Athletic Conference football standings
	Conf.			Overall
Team	W		L	W		L
No. 3 Grand Valley State $^	6	–	0	11	–	2
No. 9 Ferris State ^	5	–	1	8	–	3
Davenport	4	–	2	8	–	2
Saginaw Valley State	3	–	3	6	–	5
Wayne State (MI)	2	–	4	3	–	8
Michigan Tech	1	–	5	5	–	5
Northern Michigan	0	–	6	0	–	11
$ – Conference champion; ^ – NCAA Division II playoff participant; Rankings from AFCA Poll

The 2023 Saginaw Valley State Cardinals football team represented Saginaw Valley State University (SVSU) as a member of the Great Lakes Intercollegiate Athletic Conference (GLIAC) during the 2023 NCAA Division II football season. In their fourth year under head coach Ryan Brady, the Cardinals compiled a 6–5 record (3–3 in conference games), finished in fourth place in the GLIAC, and outscored opponents by a total of 283 to 263.

=== Schedule ===
Date	Time	Opponent	Site	TV	Result	Attendance	Source
August 31	6:00 p.m.	Winona State*	Wickes Stadium; University Center, MI		W 34–24	1,414	
September 9	6:00 p.m.	Northwood*	Wickes Stadium; University Center, MI		W 31–8	2,689	
September 16	2:00 p.m.	at Truman*	Stokes Stadium; Kirksville, MO		L 7–21	4,126	
September 23	2:00 p.m.	Indianapolis*	Wickes Stadium; University Center, MI		L 10–35	2,316	
September 30	6:00 p.m.	No. 7 Grand Valley State	Wickes Stadium; University Center, MI		L 14–55	5,085	
October 7	1:00 p.m.	at No. 1 Ferris State	Top Taggart Field; Big Rapids, MI	FloSports	L 17–38	3,124	
October 14	12:00 p.m.	at St. Xavier (IL)*	Deaton Field; Chicago, IL		W 32–10	400	
October 21	2:00 p.m.	Wayne State^{†}	Wickes Stadium; University Center, MI		W 17–10 ^{OT}	3,079	
October 28	12:00 p.m.	at No. 11 Davenport	Farmers Insurance Athletic Complex; Caledonia Township, MI		L 21–24	1,112	
November 4	1:00 p.m.	Northern Michigan	Wickes Stadium; University Center, MI		W 62–17	2	
November 11	1:00 p.m.	at Michigan Tech	Kearly Stadium; Houghton, MI		W 38–21	1,191	
*Non-conference game; ^{†}Homecoming; Rankings from AFCA Poll released prior to the game; All times are in Eastern time

== 2024 ==
2024 Saginaw Valley State Cardinals football
- Conference: Great Lakes Intercollegiate Athletic Conference
- Record: 7–4 (4–3 GLIAC)
- Head coach: Ryan Brady (5th season)
- Home stadium: Harvey Randall Wickes Memorial Stadium

2024 Great Lakes Intercollegiate Athletic Conference football standings
	Conf.			Overall
Team	W		L	W		L
No. 1 Ferris State $^	7	–	0	14	–	1
No. 6 Grand Valley State ^	6	–	1	11	–	2
Davenport	4	–	3	7	–	4
Michigan Tech	4	–	3	7	–	4
Saginaw Valley State	4	–	3	7	–	4
Wayne State (MI)	2	–	5	2	–	9
Roosevelt*	1	–	6	1	–	9
Northern Michigan	0	–	7	0	–	11
$ – Conference champion; ^ – NCAA Division II playoff participant; * – Roosevelt ineligible for postseason play due to transition from NAIA; Rankings from AFCA poll

The 2024 Saginaw Valley State Cardinals football team represented Saginaw Valley State University (SVSU) as a member of the Great Lakes Intercollegiate Athletic Conference (GLIAC) during the 2024 NCAA Division II football season. In their fifth year under head coach Ryan Brady, the Cardinals compiled a 7–4 record (4–3 in conference games), finished in a three-way tie for third place in the GLIAC, and outscored opponents by a total of 322 to 189.

=== Schedule ===
Date	Time	Opponent	Site	TV	Result	Attendance	Source
September 5	7:00 p.m.	at Winona State*	Altra Federal Credit Union Stadium; Winona, MN		W 38–14	3,061	
September 14	1:00 p.m.	at Northwood*	Hantz Stadium; Midland, MI		L 7–10	3,404	
September 21	2:00 p.m.	Truman*	Wickes Stadium; University Center, MI		W 37–14	3,323	
September 28	6:00 p.m.	at No. 15 Indianapolis*	Key Stadium; Indianapolis, IN		W 28–24	2,076	
October 5	1:00 p.m.	at Northern Michigan	Superior Dome; Marquette, MI		W 63–14	2,553	
October 12	1:00 p.m.	at Roosevelt	Morris Field; Arlington Heights, IL		W 27–14	812	
October 19	3:00 p.m.	No. 2 Grand Valley State^{†}	Wickes Stadium; University Center, MI (Battle of the Valleys)		L 9–16	8,586	
October 26	1:00 p.m.	at Wayne State	Tom Adams Field; Detroit, MI		W 37–10	2,726	
November 2	1:00 p.m.	Davenport	Wickes Stadium; University Center, MI		W 24–14	4,339	
November 9	1:00 p.m.	at No. 2 Ferris State	Top Taggart Field; Big Rapids, MI		L 24–27	2,856	
November 16	1:00 p.m.	Michigan Tech	Wickes Stadium; University Center, MI	FloSports	L 28–32	2,968	
*Non-conference game; ^{†}Homecoming; Rankings from AFCA Poll released prior to the game; All times are in Eastern time

== 2025 ==
2025 Saginaw Valley State Cardinals football
- Conference: Great Lakes Intercollegiate Athletic Conference
- Record: 6–5 (5–2 GLIAC)
- Head coach: Ryan Brady (6th season)
- Home stadium: Harvey Randall Wickes Memorial Stadium

2025 Great Lakes Intercollegiate Athletic Conference football standings
	Conf.			Overall
Team	W		L	W		L
No. 1 Ferris State $^	7	–	0	16	–	0
Grand Valley State	5	–	2	7	–	3
Saginaw Valley State	5	–	2	6	–	5
Michigan Tech	4	–	3	7	–	4
Davenport	4	–	3	5	–	5
Northern Michigan	2	–	5	3	–	8
Roosevelt*	1	–	6	2	–	8
Wayne State (MI)	0	–	7	0	–	11
$ – Conference champion; ^ – NCAA Division II playoff participant; * – Roosevelt ineligible for postseason play due to transition from NAIA; Rankings from AFCA poll

The 2025 Saginaw Valley State Cardinals football team represents Saginaw Valley State University (SVSU) as a member of the Great Lakes Intercollegiate Athletic Conference (GLIAC) during the 2025 NCAA Division II football season. They are expected to be led by Ryan Brady in his sixth year as head coach.

=== Schedule ===
Date	Time	Opponent	Site	TV	Result	Attendance	Source
August 28	6:00 p.m.	Northeastern State*	Wickes Stadium; University Center, MI		L 21–28	3,028	
September 6	2:00 p.m.	Gannon*	Wickes Stadium; University Center, MI		W 49–28	3,642	
September 13	6:00 p.m.	Northwood*	Wickes Stadium; University Center, MI		L 14–38	4,855	
September 20	1:00 p.m.	at New Haven*	Ralph F. DellaCamera Stadium; West Haven, CT	NEC Front Row	L 28–35	5,467	
October 4	2:00 p.m.	Northern Michigan^{†}	Wickes Stadium; University Center, MI		W 47–25	3,226	
October 11	2:00 p.m.	Roosevelt	Wickes Stadium; University Center, MI		W 55–10	2,069	
October 18	2:00 p.m.	at No. 7 Grand Valley State	Lubbers Stadium; Allendale, MI	FloSports	W 20–19	9,814	
October 25	2:00 p.m.	Wayne State	Wickes Stadium; University Center, MI	FloSports	W 28–7	2,279	
November 1	12:00 p.m.	at Davenport	Farmers Insurance Athletic Complex; Caledonia Township, MI	FloSports	L 17–31	966	
November 8	1:00 p.m.	No. 1 Ferris State	Wickes Stadium; University Center, MI		L 45–51 ^{2OT}	4,263	
November 15	2:00 p.m.	at Michigan Tech	Kearly Stadium; Houghton, MI	FloSports	W 24–21	1,282	
*Non-conference game; ^{†}Homecoming; Rankings from AFCA Poll released prior to the game; All times are in Eastern time
