= Michigan Tech Huskies football, 2020–present =

American college football seasons

2020–present Michigan Tech Huskies football
- Conference: Great Lakes Intercollegiate Athletic Conference
- Head coach: Steve Olson (2017–2019, 2021–2022); Dan Mettlach (2023– )
- Home stadium: Kearly Stadium

The Michigan Tech Huskies football program, 2020–present represented Michigan Technological University during the 2020s in NCAA Division II college football as a member of the Great Lakes Intercollegiate Athletic Conference (GLIAC). The team has been led during the 2020s by two head coaches: Steve Olson (2017–2019, 2021–2022); and Dan Mettlach (2023–present).

The team played its home games at Kearly Stadium in Houghton, Michigan.

== 2020 ==
2020 Michigan Tech Huskies football
- Conference: Great Lakes Intercollegiate Athletic Conference
- Head coach: Steve Olson (4th season)
- Offensive coordinator: Jace Daniels (2nd season)
- Defensive coordinator: Ken Klein (9th season)
- Home stadium: Kearly Stadium

2020 Great Lakes Intercollegiate Athletic Conference football standings
	Conf.			Overall
Team	W		L	W		L
Davenport		–		2	–	0
Notes: Due to COVID-19, the Great Lakes Intercollegiate Athletic Conference suspended the fall 2020 football season. The conference also announced no in-conference competition for spring 2021 play. Schools scheduled own games if desired to play. Ashland, Ferris State, Grand Valley State, Michigan Tech, Northern Michigan, Northwood, Saginaw Valley State and Wayne State (MI) opted out of the spring season.

The 2020 Michigan Tech Huskies football team would have represented Michigan Tech University during the 2020 NCAA Division II football season. The Huskies were to compete as members of the Great Lakes Intercollegiate Athletic Conference (GLIAC) and play their home games at Kearly Stadium in Houghton, Michigan. This would be the program's fourth season under head coach Steve Olson. Instead, The GLIAC cancelled the season due to the ongoing COVID-19 pandemic.

=== Schedule ===
Date	Time	Opponent	Site	Result
September 19		at Saginaw Valley State	Klearly Stadium; Houghton, MI	Cancelled
September 26	6:00 p.m.	Wayne State (MI)	Tom Adams Field; Detroit, MI	Cancelled
October 10		Ashland	Klearly Stadium; Houghton, MI	Cancelled
October 23	1:00 p.m.	Ferris State	Klearly Stadium; Houghton, MI	Cancelled
November 6	1:00 p.m.	at Northwood	Hantz Stadium; Midland, MI	Cancelled
October 2	1:00 p.m.	Davenport^{†}	Klearly Stadium; Houghton, MI	Cancelled
October 30	3:00 p.m.	Grand Valley State	Lubbers Stadium; Allendale, MI	Cancelled
^{†}Homecoming; All times are in Eastern time

=== Coaching staff ===
Name	Position	Season
Steve Olson	Head coach/defensive line	4th
Dan Mettlach	Associate head coach/offensive coordinator	4th
Phil Milbrath	Running backs coach/special teams coordinator	4th
Bryan Thomas	Defensive coordinator/linebackers	11th
Josh Wood	Secondary Defensive coordinator/recruiting coordinator	10th
Jace Daniels	Offensive line coach	2nd
Ken Klein	Defensive line coach	9th

== 2021 ==
2021 Michigan Tech Huskies football
- Conference: Great Lakes Intercollegiate Athletic Conference
- Record: 6–4 (5–3 GLIAC)
- Head coach: Steve Olson (4th season)
- Offensive coordinator: Dan Mettlach (4th season)
- Home stadium: Kearly Stadium

2021 Great Lakes Intercollegiate Athletic Conference football standings
	Conf.			Overall
Team	W		L	W		L
No. 1 Ferris State $^	7	–	0	14	–	0
No. 7 Grand Valley State ^	6	–	1	10	–	2
Michigan Tech	5	–	2	6	–	4
Saginaw Valley State	4	–	3	7	–	4
Northern Michigan	2	–	5	4	–	7
Davenport	2	–	5	3	–	8
Wayne State (MI)	2	–	5	2	–	9
Northwood	0	–	7	1	–	9
$ – Conference champion; ^ – NCAA Division II playoff participant; Rankings from AFCA Poll

The 2021 Michigan Tech Huskies football team represented Michigan Tech University as a member of the Great Lakes Intercollegiate Athletic Conference (GLIAC) during the 2021 NCAA Division II football season. In their fourth year under head coach Steve Olson, the Huskies compiled a 6–4 record (5–3 in conference games), finished third in the GLIAC, and outscored opponents by a total of 200 to 186.

The Huskies were ranked fifth in the GLIAC preseason coaches poll.

=== Schedule ===
Date	Time	Opponent	Site	TV	Result	Attendance	Source
September 4	2:00 p.m.	Hillsdale*	Kearly Stadium; Houghton, MI		W 14–10	1,767	
September 11	1:00 p.m.	St. Thomas (MN)*	Kearly Stadium; Houghton, MI		L 9–12	1,660	
September 25	1:00 p.m.	No. 9 Grand Valley State	Kearly Stadium; Houghton, MI		L 21–44	1,447	
October 2	1:00 p.m.	Davenport^{†}	Kearly Stadium; Houghton, MI		W 31–7	1,700	
October 9	6:00 p.m.	at Wayne State (MI)	Tom Adams Field; Detroit, MI		W 30–27	3,674	
October 16	12:00 p.m.	at Northern Michigan	Superior Dome; Marquette, MI (Miner's Cup)	WLUC	W 21–14	3,597	
October 23	1:00 p.m.	No. 1 Ferris State	Kearly Stadium; Houghton, MI		L 10–38	1,332	
October 30	3:00 p.m.	at No. 7 Grand Valley State	Lubbers Stadium; Allendale, MI		L 9–14	8,652	
November 6	1:00 p.m.	at Northwood	Hantz Stadium; Midland, MI		W 34–0	1,031	
November 13	1:00 p.m.	Saginaw Valley State	Kearly Stadium; Houghton, MI		W 21–20	1,315	
*Non-conference game; ^{†}Homecoming; Rankings from AFCA Poll released prior to the game; All times are in Eastern time

=== Game summaries ===
==== Hillsdale ====
Week One: Hillsdale Chargers at Michigan Tech – Game summary

Quarter	1	2	3	4	Total
St. Thomas	0	0	3	7	10
Michigan Tech	0	0	0	14	14

at Klearly Stadium • Houghton, MI

- Date: September 4, 2021
- Game time: 1:00 p.m.
- Game weather: Cloudy
- Game attendance: 1,776
- Referee: Rick Schifter

==== St. Thomas ====
Series Record	Previous meeting	Result
0–1	N/A	N/A

Week Two: St. Thomas Tommies at Michigan Tech – Game summary

Quarter	1	2	3	4	Total
St. Thomas	0	3	0	9	12
Michigan Tech	6	3	0	0	9

at Klearly Stadium • Houghton, MI

- Date: September 11, 2021
- Game time: 1:00 p.m.
- Game weather: Mostly Sunny
- Game attendance: 1,660
- Referee: Bradley Mutnick

==== Grand Valley State ====
Week Four: No. 9 Grand Valley State Lakers at Michigan Tech – Game summary

Quarter	1	2	3	4	Total
Grand Valley St	7	23	7	7	44
Michigan Tech	0	0	14	7	21

at Klearly Stadium • Houghton, MI

- Date: September 25, 2021
- Game time: 1:00 p.m.
- Game weather: Cloudy
- Game attendance: 1,447
- Referee: Brian Bower

==== Davenport ====
Week Five: Davenport Panthers at Michigan Tech – Game summary

Quarter	1	2	3	4	Total
Davenport	0	7	0	0	7
Michigan Tech	14	14	0	3	31

at Klearly Stadium • Houghton, MI

- Date: October 2, 2021
- Game time: 1:00 p.m.
- Game weather: Sunny
- Game attendance: 1,700
- Referee: Brian Bower

==== Wayne State (MI) ====
Week Six: Michigan Tech at Wayne State – Game summary

Quarter	1	2	3	4	Total
Michigan Tech	7	6	14	3	30
Wayne State	3	17	7	0	27

at Tom Adams Field • Detroit, MI

- Date: October 9, 2021
- Game time: 6:00 p.m.
- Game weather: Sunny
- Game attendance: 3,674
- Referee: Bradley Mutnick

==== Northern Michigan ====
Week Seven: Michigan Tech at Northern Michigan – Game summary

Quarter	1	2	3	4	Total
Michigan Tech	7	0	0	14	21
Northern Michigan	7	0	7	0	14

at Superior Dome • Marquette, MI

- Date: October 16, 2021
- Game time: 1:00 p.m.
- Game weather: Sunny
- Game attendance: 3,597
- Referee: Marty Trudgeon

For the 11th straight season, Michigan Tech took home the Miner's Cup. During their winning streak, Michigan Tech beat the Wildcats by an average of 8.6 points per game, or an average total of 30.1-21.5 per game. This victory is the largest since a 28–21 victory in 2017. Since 2002, the start of the Miner's Cup, Michigan Tech is 16–3 against the Wildcats, averaging a 31.5-22.2 win per game, or a 9.3 point margin of victory. Michigan Tech has outscored Northern Michigan 599–421 in this series.

==== Ferris State ====
Week Eight: Ferris State at Michigan Tech – Game summary

Quarter	1	2	3	4	Total
Ferris State	14	14	10	0	38
Michigan Tech	0	7	0	3	10

at Klearly Stadium • Houghton, MI

- Date: October 23, 2021
- Game time: 1:00 p.m.
- Game weather: Footbally
- Game attendance: 1,332
- Referee: CJ Jackson

Game information

First Quarter

- (14:41) FSU TD: Hunt-Thompson 49-yard pass from Jare Bernhardt (Sy Barnett kick)
  FSU 7–0; 1 plays, 49 yards, 0:09
- (08:06) FSU TD: Jare Bernhardt 2-yard run (Sy Barnett kick)
  FSU 14–0; 10 plays, 43 yards, 5:29

Second Quarter

- (05:20) FSU TD: Xavier Wade 14-yard pass from Jare Bernhardt (Sy Barnett kick)
  FSU 21–0; 6 plays, 75 yards, 3:01
- (02:28) MTU TD: Darius Willis 31-yard pass from Will Ark (Drew Wyble kick)
  FSU 21–7; 5 plays, 75 yards, 2:52
- (00:19) FSU TD: Tyler Minor 5-yard run (Sy Barnett kick)
  FSU 28–7; 7 plays, 73 yards, 2:23

Third Quarter

- (06:30) FSU TD: Xavier Wade 5-yard pass from Jare Bernhardt (Sy Barnett kick)
  FSU 35–7; 5 plays, 39 yards, 1:51
- (04:20) FSU FG: Sy Barnett 26-yard field goal
  FSU 38–7; 8 plays, 61 yards, 4:43

Fourth Quarter

- (13:23) MTU FG: Darius Willis 21-yard field goal
  FSU 38–10; 7 plays, 36 yards, 2:15

Passing

- MTU – Will Ark: 15/32, 145 yards, 1 TD
- FSU – Jare Bernhardt: 17/21, 289 yards, 3 TD, 1 INT

Rushing

- MTU – Jared Smith: 9 carries, 26 yards
- FSU – Tyler Minor: 11 carries, 81 yards, 1 TD

Receiving

- MTU – Darius Willis: 6 receptions, 91 yards, 1 TD
- FSU – Xavier Wade: 6 receptions, 106 yards, 2 TD

==== Grand Valley State ====
Week Nine: Michigan Tech at Grand Valley State – Game summary

Quarter	1	2	3	4	Total
Michigan Tech	0	0	3	6	9
Grand Valley State	7	7	0	0	14

at Klearly Stadium • Houghton, MI

- Date: October 30, 2021
- Game time: 3:00 p.m.
- Game weather: Overcast, Footbally
- Game attendance: 8,652
- Referee: Brian Bower

Game information

First Quarter

- (05:27) GVSU TD: Scott Cooper 30-yard pass from Cade Peterson (Kollin Kralapp kick)
  GVSU 7–0; 5 plays, 68 yards, 3:41

Second Quarter

- (08:34) GVSU TD: Jacob Miller 3-yard pass from Cade Peterson (Kollin Kralapp kick)
  GVSU 14–0; 10 plays, 56 yards, 4:43

Third Quarter

- (04:20) MTU FG: Drew Wyble 30-yard field goal
  GVSU 14–3; 13 plays, 55 yards, 6:15

Fourth Quarter

- (13:23) MTU FG: Justin Davis 14-yard pass from Will Ark (two-point conversion failed)
  GVSU 14–9; 7 plays, 69 yards, 4:00

Passing

- MTU – Will Ark: 15/31, 180 yards, 1 TD, 1 INT
- GVSU – Cade Peterson: 20/31, 181 yards, 2 TD, 1 INT

Rushing

- MTU – Jared Smith: 15 carries, 47 yards
- GVSU – Cade Peterson: 9 carries, 56 yards

Receiving

- MTU – Jordan Janssen: 4 receptions, 77 yards
- GVSU – Jacob Miller: 8 receptions, 56 yards, 1 TD

==== Northwood ====
Week Ten: Michigan Tech at Northwood – Game summary

Quarter	1	2	3	4	Total
Michigan Tech	7	6	14	7	34
Northwood	0	0	0	0	0

at Klearly Stadium • Houghton, MI

- Date: November 6, 2021
- Game time: 1:00 p.m.
- Game weather: Sunny
- Game attendance: 1,031

Game information

First Quarter

- (06:31) MTU TD: Justin Davis 3-yard pass from Will Ark (Drew Wyble kick)
  MTU 7–0; 5 plays, 38 yards, 2:31

Second Quarter

- (02:29) MTU FG: Drew Wyble 25-yard field goal
  MTU 10–0; 14 plays, 65 yards, 6:20
- (00:01) MTU FG: Drew Wyble 27-yard field goal
  MTU 13–0; 9 plays, 58 yards, 1:24

Third Quarter

- (08:51) MTU TD: Jared Smith 41-yard rush (Drew Wyble kick)
  MTU 20–0; 7 plays, 61 yards, 3:51
- (02:58) MTU TD: Kyle Wood 7-yard rush (Drew Wyble kick)
  MTU 27–0; 7 plays, 70 yards, 3:16

Fourth Quarter

- (07:45) MTU TD: Michael Bates 100-yard INT Return (Drew Wyble kick)
  MTU 34–0

Passing

- MTU – Will Ark: 14/24, 182 yards, 1 TD, 1 INT
- NU – Jacob Baldwin: 5/10, 60 yards, 1 INT

Rushing

- MTU – Jared Smith: 21 carries, 123 yards, 1 TD
- NU – Ty Cox: 12 carries, 47 yards

Receiving

- MTU – Justin Davis: 7 receptions, 76 yards, 1 TD
- NU – Ethan Bunch: 3 receptions, 40 yards

Michigan Tech tallied its first shutout win since November 13, 2010. The Huskies returned an interception 100 yards for a touchdown as the last scoring play of the game.

==== Saginaw Valley State ====
Week Eleven: Saginaw Valley State at Michigan Tech – Game summary

Quarter	1	2	3	4	Total
Saginaw Valley State	3	7	7	3	20
Michigan Tech	7	7	7	0	21

at Klearly Stadium • Houghton, MI

- Date: November 13, 2021
- Game time: 1:00 p.m.
- Game weather: Cloudy
- Game attendance: 1,315
- Referee: Mike Packard

Game information

First Quarter

- (10:03) SVSU FG: Connor Luksic 27-yard field goal
  MTU 0–3; 7 plays, 35 yards, 2:47
- (06:01) MTU TD: Darius Willis 28-yard pass from Will Ark (Drew Wyble kick)
  MTU 7–3; 8 plays, 68 yards, 3:54

Second Quarter

- (10:11) MTU TD: Jared Smith 4-yard rush (Drew Wyble kick)
  MTU 14–3; 15 plays, 82 yards, 7:18
- (03:25) SVSU TD: Colby Newburg 4-yard rush (Ryan Heicher)
  MTU 14–10; 5 plays, 30 yards, 2:14

Third Quarter

- (07:07) SVSU TD: Tommy Scott 34-yard rush (Connor Lusic kick)
  MTU 14–17; 9 plays, 80 yards, 4:25
- (01:18) MTU TD: Hunter Richards 23-yard pass from Will Ark (Drew Wyble kick)
  MTU 21–17; 12 plays, 82 yards, 5:49

Fourth Quarter

- (04:57) SVSU FG: Connor Luksic 24-yard field goal
  MTU 21–20; 10 plays, 30 yards, 5:23

Passing

- MTU – Will Ark: 15/28, 141 yards, 2 TD, 1 INT
- SVSU – Colby Newburg: 10/15, 116 yards

Rushing

- MTU – Jared Smith: 15 carries, 61 yards, 1 TD
- SVSU – Tommy Scott: 18 carries, 94 yards, 1 TD

Receiving

- MTU – Jordan Janssen: 4 receptions, 36 yards
- SVSU – Isaiah Johnson-Mack: 9 receptions, 78 yards

=== Coaching staff ===
Name	Position	Season
Steve Olson	Head coach/defensive line	5th
Dan Mettlach	Associate head coach/offensive coordinator	5th
Phil Milbrath	Running backs coach/special teams coordinator	5th
Bryan Thomas	Defensive coordinator/linebackers	12th
Josh Wood	Secondary Defensive coordinator/recruiting coordinator	11th
Jace Daniels	Offensive line coach	3rd
Ken Klein	Defensive line coach	10th
Bryan Parker	Outside linebackers coach	1st

== 2022 ==
2022 Michigan Tech Huskies football
- Conference: Great Lakes Intercollegiate Athletic Conference
- Record: 4–7 (2–4 GLIAC)
- Head coach: Steve Olson (5th season)
- Offensive coordinator: Dan Mettlach (5th season)
- Home stadium: Kearly Stadium

2022 Great Lakes Intercollegiate Athletic Conference football standings
	Conf.			Overall
Team	W		L	W		L
No. 3 Grand Valley State $^	6	–	0	12	–	1
No. 1 Ferris State ^	5	–	1	14	–	1
No. 20 Davenport ^	4	–	2	8	–	3
Saginaw Valley State	3	–	3	8	–	3
Michigan Tech	2	–	4	4	–	7
Northern Michigan	1	–	5	4	–	7
Wayne State (MI)	0	–	6	1	–	9
$ – Conference champion; ^ – NCAA Division II playoff participant; Rankings from AFCA Poll

The 2022 Michigan Tech Huskies football team represented Michigan Tech University as a member of the Great Lakes Intercollegiate Athletic Conference (GLIAC) during the 2022 NCAA Division II football season. In their fifth and final year under head coach Steve Olson, the Huskies compiled a 4–7 record (2–4 in conference games), finished fifth in the GLIAC, and were outscored by a total of 295 to 212.

=== Schedule ===
Date	Time	Opponent	Site	TV	Result	Attendance	Source
September 1	6:00 p.m.	Wisconsin–Platteville*	Kearly Stadium; Houghton, MI	FloSports	W 23–13	1,933	
September 10	2:00 p.m.	at St. Thomas (MN)*	O'Shaughnessy Stadium; Saint Paul, MN		L 6–32	4,768	
September 17	8:00 p.m.	at Midwestern State*	Memorial Stadium; Wichita Falls, TX		L 21–28	6,222	
September 24	1:00 p.m.	No. 19 Saginaw Valley State*	Klearly Stadium; Houghton, MI	FloSports	L 13–35	1,284	
October 1	1:00 p.m.	at Davenport	Farmers Insurance Athletic Complex; Caledonia, MI	FloSports	L 38–52	1,622	
October 8	1:00 p.m.	Wayne State (MI)^{†}	Klearly Stadium; Houghton, MI	FloSports	W 35-34	2,291	
October 15	1:00 p.m.	Northern Michigan	Klearly Stadium; Houghton, MI (Miner's Cup)	FloSports	W 21–7	1,629	
October 22	1:00 p.m	at No. 7 Ferris State	Top Taggart Field; Big Rapids, MI	FloSports	L 20–28	4,914	
October 29	1:00 p.m.	No. 1 Grand Valley State	Klearly Stadium; Houghton, MI	FloSports	L 7–42	1,512	
November 5	1:00 p.m.	at Hillsdale*	Frank "Muddy" Waters Stadium; Hillsdale, MI		W 28–24	1,407	
November 12	1:00 p.m	at Saginaw Valley State	Harvey Randall Wickes Memorial Stadium; University Center, MI	FloSports	L 30–35	3,265	
*Non-conference game; ^{†}Homecoming; Rankings from AFCA Poll released prior to the game; All times are in Eastern time

=== Personnel ===
==== Coaching staff ====
Name	Position	Season
Steve	Head coach/defensive line	6th
Dan Mettlach	Associate head coach/offensive coordinator	6th
Phil Milbrath	Running backs coach/special teams coordinator	6th
Bryan Thomas	Defensive coordinator/linebackers	13th
Josh Wood	Secondary defensive coordinator/recruiting coordinator	12th
Jack Rustman	Offensive line coach	1st
Ken Klein	Defensive line coach	11th
Bryan Parker	Outside linebackers coach	2nd

=== Game summaries ===
==== Wisconsin–Platteville ====
Week One: Wisconsin-Platteville at Michigan Tech – Game summary

Quarter	1	2	3	4	Total
Wisconsin-Platteville	0	0	7	6	13
Michigan Tech	0	7	16	0	23

at Klearly Stadium • Houghton, MI

- Date: September 1, 2022
- Game time: 6:00 p.m.
- Game weather: Sunny
- Game attendance: 1,933
- Referee: Mike Packard
- TV: FloSports

Game information

Second Quarter

- (00:10) MTU TD: Steele Fortress 3-yard run (kick)
  MTU 7–0; 5 plays, 62 yards, 1:47

Third Quarter

- (13:23) MTU SF: Team Safety
  MTU 9–0; 0 plays, 0 yards, 0:00
- (09:47) MTU TD: Darius Willis 31-yard pass from Steele Fortress (kick)
  MTU 16–0; 6 plays, 61 yards, 3:25
- (06:43) UWP TD: Lukas Peterson 9-yard pass from Nathan Shackelford (kick)
  MTU 16–7; 5 plays, 70 yards, 2:59
- (00:56) MTU TD: Darius Willis 9-yard pass from Will Ark (kick)
  MTU 23–7; 6 plays, 27 yards, 2:58

Fourth Quarter

- (01:40) UWP TD: Brandt Stare 8-yard pass from Nathan Shackelford
  MTU 23–13; 14 plays, 80 yards, 4:37

Passing

- MTU – Steele Fortress: 8/12, 131 yards, 1 TD
- UWP – Beau Kopp: 18/23, 126 yards, 2 TD

Rushing

- MTU – William Marano: 17 carries, 48 yards
- UWP – Reece Shelton: 2 carries, 30 yards

Receiving

- MTU – Darius Willis: 3 receptions, 59 yards, 2 TD
- UWP – Austin Guy: 12 receptions, 68 yards

==== St. Thomas ====
Week Two: Michigan Tech at St. Thomas – Game summary

Quarter	1	2	3	4	Total
Michigan Tech	3	0	0	3	6
St. Thomas	6	20	6	0	32

at O'Shaughnessy Stadium • Saint Paul, MN

- Date: September 10, 2022
- Game time: 2:00 p.m.
- Game weather: Cloudy
- Game attendance: 4,768
- Referee: Tim Duffy

Game information

First Quarter

- (12:35) STM TD: Shawn Shipman 1-yard run
  STM 6–0; 5 plays, 72 yards, 2:20
- (04:34) MTU FG: Drew Wyble 25-yard field goal
  STM 6–3; 13 plays, 57 yards, 7:55

Second Quarter

- (10:44) STM TD: Mitchell Schares blocked punt return touchdown (kick)
  STM 13–3; 0 plays, 0 yards, 0:00
- (05:55) STM TD: Andrew McElroy 33-yard pass from Cade Sexauer
  STM 19-3; 2 plays, 38 yards, 0:37
- (00:19) STM TD: Shawn Shipman 1-yard run (kick)
  STM 26-3; 13 plays, 61 yards, 04:22

Third Quarter

- (03:28) STM TD: Kolby Gartner 11-yard run
  STM 32–3; 7 plays, 40 yards, 2:10

Fourth Quarter

- (02:50) MTU FG: Drew Wyble 40-yard field goal
  STM 32–6; 10 plays, 21 yards, 5:17

Passing

- MTU – Will Ark: 7/21, 53 yards, 1 INT
- STM – Cade Sexauer: 8/17, 91 yards, 1 TD, 1 INT

Rushing

- MTU – William Marano: 16 carries, 46 yards
- STM – Shawn Shipman: 23 carries, 151 yards, 2 TD

Receiving

- MTU – Darius Willis: 4 receptions, 28 yards
- STM – Andrew McElroy: 4 receptions, 70 yards, 1 TD

==== Midwestern State ====
Week Three: Michigan Tech at Midwestern State – Game summary

Quarter	1	2	3	4	Total
Michigan Tech	0	14	7	0	21
Midwestern State	0	7	0	21	28

at Memorial Stadium • Wichita, TX

- Date: September 17, 2022
- Game time: 8:00 p.m.
- Game weather: Sunny
- Game attendance: 6,222
- Referee: Michael Murff

Game information

Second Quarter

- (13:42) MTU TD: Brandon Michalak 43-yard pass from Will Ark (kick)
  MTU 7–0; 11 plays, 91 yards, 6:15
- (09:25) MTU TD: Darius Willis 11-yard pass from Will Ark (kick)
  MTU 14–0; 3 plays, 17 yards, 1:27
- (03:53) MSU TD: Dillon Sterling-Cole 1-yard rush (kick)
  MTU 14–7; 12 plays, 73 yards, 5:24

Third Quarter

- (05:58) MTU TD: William Marano 12-yard run (kick)
  MTU 21–7; 8 plays, 74 yards, 4:05

Fourth Quarter

- (08:30) MSU TD: Terence Norman 35-yard pass from Dillon Sterling-Cole
  MTU 21–14; 3 plays, 70 yards, 0:52
- (00:43) MSU TD: Ja'Marzeyea Arvie 13-yard pass from Dillon Sterling-Cole (kick)
  Tied 21–21; 8 plays, 50 yards, 2:29
- (00:12) MSU TD: Malik Owens 52-yard Interception Return (kick)
  MSU 28–21; 0 plays, 0 yards, 0:00

Passing

- MTU – Will Ark: 16/28, 233 yards, 2 TD, 1 INT
- MSU – Dillon Sterling Cole: 20/33, 266 yards, 2 TD, 2 INT

Rushing

- MTU – William Marano: 18 carries, 54 yards, 1 TD
- MSU – Devin Cross: 19 carries, 91 yards

Receiving

- MTU – Brandon Michalak: 4 receptions, 77 yards, 1 TD
- MSU – Ja'Marzeeyea Arvie: 7 receptions, 94 yards, 1 TD

==== Saginaw Valley State ====
Week Four: Saginaw Valley State at Michigan Tech – Game summary

Quarter	1	2	3	4	Total
Saginaw Valley State	7	14	14	0	35
Michigan Tech	6	7	0	0	13

at Klearly Stadium • Houghton, MI

- Date: September 24, 2022
- Game time: 12:00 p.m.
- Game weather: Cloudy
- Game attendance: 1,284
- Referee: Alex Bade
- TV: FloSports

Game information

First Quarter

- (09:23) SVSU TD: Derek Hinton Jr 20-yard pass from Andrew Brito (kick)
  SVSU 7–0; 6 plays, 73 yards, 2:55
- (04:10) MTU TD: William Marano 3-yard run
  SVSU 7–6; 5 plays, 80 yards, 2:11

Second Quarter

- (14:16) MTU TD: Brandon Michalak 30-yard pass from Ethan Champney (kick)
  MTU 13–7; 6 plays, 48 yards, 3:26
- (14:04) SVSU TD: Isaiah Malcome 75-yard run (kick)
  SVSU 14–13; 1 plays, 75 yards, 0:12
- (08:16) SVSU TD: Isaiah Malcome 7-yard run (kick)
  SVSU 21–13; 8 plays, 65 yards, 2:42

Third Quarter

- (09:04) SVSU TD: Andrew Brito 1-yard run (kick)
  SVSU 28–13; 8 plays, 40 yards, 3:49
- (02:50) SVSU TD: Derek Hinton Jr 13-yard pass from Andrew Brito (kick)
  SVSU 35–13; 8 plays, 50 yards, 2:29

Passing

- MTU – Will Ark: 11/20, 99 yards, 1 INT
- SVSU – Andrew Brito: 14/18, 176 yards, 2 TD

Rushing

- MTU – William Marano: 17 carries, 44 yards, 1 TD
- SVSU – Isaiah Malcome: 20 carries, 174 yards, 2 TD

Receiving

- MTU – Darius Willis: 4 receptions, 71 yards
- SVSU – Derek Hinton Jr: 5 receptions, 82 yards, 2 TD

==== Davenport ====
Week Five: Michigan Tech at Davenport – Game summary

Quarter	1	2	3	4	Total
Michigan Tech	17	7	7	7	38
Davenport	0	14	21	17	52

at Farmers Insurance Athletic Complex • Caledonia, MI

- Date: October 1, 2022
- Game time: 12:00 p.m.
- Game weather: Sunny
- Game attendance: 1,622
- Referee: Brad Mutnick
- TV: FloSports

Game information

First Quarter

- (08:27) MTU TD: Will Ark 1-yard run (kick)
  MTU 7–0; 11 plays, 75 yards, 6:33
- (07:35) MTU TD: Darius Willis 26-yard pass from Will Ark (kick)
  MTU 14–0; 2 plays, 30 yards, 0:51
- (03:11) MTU FG: Drew Wyble 31-yard Field Goal
  MTU 17–0; 7 plays, 21 yards, 3:29

Second Quarter

- (14:52) DU TD: Preston Smith 12-yard pass from Jason Whittaker (kick)
  MTU 17–7; 8 plays, 67 yards, 3:15
- (06:07) MTU TD: Alec Moriarty 2-yard run (kick)
  MTU 24–7; 15 plays, 75 yards, 8:40
- (04:25) DU TD: Roy Livingstone 20-yard pass from Jason Whittaker (kick)
  MTU 24–14; 5 plays, 74 yards, 1:37

Third Quarter

- (10:04) DU TD: Preston Smith 8-yard pass from Jason Whittaker (kick)
  MTU 24–21; 4 plays, 84 yards, 2:25
- (04:34) DU TD: Jason Whittaker 1-yard run (kick)
  DU 28–24; 4 plays, 58 yards, 1:42
- (03:35) MTU TD: Brandon Michalak 69-yard pass from Will Ark (kick)
  MTU 31–28; 3 plays, 75 yards, 0:59
- (01:11) DU TD: Demetrius Garrett 30-yard pass from Jason Whittaker (kick)
  DU 35–31; 6 plays, 75 yards, 2:24

Fourth Quarter

- (12:28) DU TD: Roy Livingstone 12-yard pass from Jason Whittaker (kick)
  DU 42–31; 6 plays, 89 yards, 2:35
- (05:28) DU FG: Brandono Gielow 32-yard Field Goal
  DU 45–31; 10 plays, 37 yards, 5:05
- (01:24) DU TD: Kyshawn Richards 38-yard run (kick)
  DU 52–31; 6 plays, 60 yards, 1:44
- (00:18) MTU TD: Will Ark 11-yard run (kick)
  DU 52–38; 8 plays, 75 yards, 1:06

Passing

- MTU – Will Ark: 21/39, 267 yards, 2 TD, 2 INT
- DU – Jason Whittaker: 24/40, 361 yards, 5 TD, 1 INT

Rushing

- MTU – William Marano: 14 carries, 48 yards
- DU – Kyshawn Richards: 5 carries, 147 yards, 1 TD

Receiving

- MTU – Brandon Michalak: 3 receptions, 97 yards, 1 TD
- DU – Preston Smith: 9 receptions, 143 yards, 2 TD

==== Wayne State (MI) ====
Week Six: Wayne State at Michigan Tech – Game summary

Quarter	1	2	3	4	Total
Wayne State	10	7	7	10	34
Michigan Tech	7	7	7	14	35

at Klearly Stadium • Houghton, MI

- Date: October 8, 2022
- Game time: 1:00 p.m.
- Game weather: Sunny
- Game attendance: 2,291
- Referee: Joe Abro
- TV: FloSports

Game information

First Quarter

- (14:02) MTU TD: Braxt Blackwell 47-yard interception return (kick)
  MTU 7–0; 0 plays, 0 yards, 0:00
- (11:15) WSU TD: Myren Harris 18-yard run (kick)
  Tied 7–7; 8 plays, 76 yards, 2:41
- (08:20) WSU FG: Gri. Milovanski 24-yard Field Goal
  WSU 10–7; 7 plays, 19 yards, 2:53

Second Quarter

- (14:04) MTU TD: Luke Terrian 5-yard pass from Will Ark (kick)
  MTU 14–10; 9 plays, 67 yards, 4:53
- (04:10) WSU TD: Myren Harris 9-yard run (kick)
  WSU 17–14; 6 plays, 47 yards, 2:45

Third Quarter

- (00:04) WSU TD: Kend. Williams 19-yard run (kick)
  WSU 24–14; 5 plays, 85 yards, 2:11
- (00:27) MTU TD: Brandon Michalak 59-yard pass from Will Ark (kick)
  WSU 24–21; 6 plays, 47 yards, 2:45

Fourth Quarter

- (11:26) WSU TD: Kend. Williams 48-yard run (kick)
  WSU 31–21; 6 plays, 70 yards, 3:19
- (10:59) MTU TD: Darius Willis 20-yard pass from Will Ark (kick)
  WSU 31–28; 1 plays, 79 yards, 0:18
- (08:15) WSU FG: Gri. Milovanski 24-yard Field Goal
  WSU 34–28; 5 plays, 48 yards, 2:35
- (00:27) MTU TD: Will Ark 1-yard run (kick)
  MTU 35–34; 10 plays, 64 yards, 1:55

Passing

- MTU – Will Ark: 22/31, 340 yards, 3 TD
- WSU – Josh Kulka: 8/16, 90 yards, 2 INT

Rushing

- MTU – William Marano: 15 carries, 31 yards
- WSU – Myren Harris: 36 carries, 296 yards, 2 TD

Receiving

- MTU – Darius Willis: 9 receptions, 183 yards, 1 TD
- WSU – Dion Brown: 3 receptions, 41 yards

==== Northern Michigan ====
Week Seven: Northern Michigan at Michigan Tech – Game summary

Quarter	1	2	3	4	Total
Northern Michigan	0	0	0	7	7
Michigan Tech	0	7	7	7	21

at Klearly Stadium • Houghton, MI

- Date: October 15, 2022
- Game time: 1:00 p.m.
- Game weather: Rain
- Game attendance: 1,629
- Referee: Carl Chapman
- TV: FloSports

Game information

Second Quarter

- (06:04) MTU TD: Darius Willis 41-yard pass from Will Ark (kick)
  MTU 7–0; 4 plays, 60 yards, 2:06

Third Quarter

- (10:22) MTU TD: Brandon Michalak 24-yard pass from Will Ark (kick)
  MTU 14–0; 5 plays, 63 yards, 2:27

Fourth Quarter

- (13:23) MTU TD: Darius Willis 29-yard Field Goal (kick)
  MTU 21–0; 8 plays, 74 yards, 4:36
- (11:57) NMU TD: Tyshon King 2-yard run (kick)
  MTU 21–7; 5 plays, 55 yards, 1:19

Passing

- MTU – Will Ark: 13/19, 139 yards, 2 TD
- NMU – Drake Davis: 12/20, 93 yards, 1 INT

Rushing

- MTU – Will Ark: 12 carries, 52 yards
- NMU – Tyshon King: 13 carries, 42 yards, 1 TD

Receiving

- MTU – Darius Willis: 6 receptions, 99 yards, 2 TD
- NMU – Charlie Gerhard: 3 receptions, 56 yards

==== Ferris State ====
Week Eight: Michigan Tech at Ferris State – Game summary

Quarter	1	2	3	4	Total
Michigan Tech	10	0	0	10	20
Ferris State	0	7	7	14	28

at Top Taggart Field • Big Rapids, MI

- Date: October 22, 2022
- Game time: 1:00 p.m.
- Game weather: Sunny
- Game attendance: 4,914
- Referee: CJ Jackson
- TV: FloSports

Game information

First Quarter

- (11:07) MTU TD: Darius Willis 5-yard pass from Will Ark (kick)
  MTU 7–0; 4 plays, 80 yards, 2:03
- (01:29) MTU FG: Drew Wyble 23-yard Field Goal
  MTU 10–0; 14 plays, 74 yards, 7:04

Second Quarter

- (07:40) FSU TD: Carson Gulker 3-yard run (kick)
  MTU 10–7; 5 plays, 55 yards, 1:44

Third Quarter

- (08:48) FSU TD: Carson Gulker 1-yard run (kick)
  FSU 14–10; 12 plays, 52 yards, 5:48

Fourth Quarter

- (10:59) FSU TD: Carson Gulker 7-yard run (kick)
  FSU 21–10; 11 plays, 80 yards, 4:30
- (08:54) MTU TD: Hunter Buechel 25-yard INTERCEPTION return (kick)
  FSU 21–17; 0 plays, 0 yards, 0:00
- (08:44) FSU TD: T. Hunt-Thompson 75-yard pass from Carson Gulker (kick)
  FSU 28–17; 1 plays, 75 yards, 0:10
- (05:38) MTU FG: Drew Wyble 20-yard Field Goal
  FSU 28–20; 8 plays, 72 yards, 3:06

Passing

- MTU – Will Ark: 26/50, 297 yards, 1 TD, 1 INT
- FSU – Carson Gulker: 7/13, 174 yards, 1 TD, 1 INT

Rushing

- MTU – Brenden Lach: 1 carries, 3 yards
- FSU – Carson Gulker: 23 carries, 103 yards, 3 TD

Receiving

- MTU – Brandon Michalak: 8 receptions, 155 yards
- FSU – Tyrese Hunt-Thompson: 4 receptions, 130 yards, 1 TD

==== Hillsdale ====
Week Nine: Michigan Tech at St. Thomas – Game summary

Quarter	1	2	3	4	Total
Michigan Tech	7	7	0	14	28
St. Thomas	0	10	7	7	24

at Frank Waters Stadium • Hillsdale, MI

- Date: September 4, 2022
- Game time: 1:00 p.m.
- Game weather: Rain
- Game attendance: 1,407
- Referee: Ted Serama
- TV: Livestreamed

Game information

First Quarter

- (05:53) MTU TD: Will Ark 4-yard run (kick)
  MTU 7–0; 10 plays, 97 yards, 4:51

Second Quarter

- (07:19) HILL TD: Isaac TeSlaa 42-yard pass from Luke Keller (kick)
  Tied 7–7; 9 plays, 79 yards, 6:14
- (02:29) MTU TD: Ethan Champney 39-yard pass from Will Ark (kick)
  MTU 14–7; 8 plays, 75 yards, 4:50
- (00:00) HILL FG: Julian Lee 27-yard Field Goal
  MTU 14–10; 12 plays, 64 yards, 2:29

Third Quarter

- (03:23) HILL TD: Julius Graber 40-yard fumble recovery (kick)
  HILL 17–14

Fourth Quarter

- (13:38) HILL TD: Isaac TeSlaa 14-yard pass from Luke Keller (kick)
  HILL 24–14; 5 plays, 64 yards, 2:22
- (08:04) MTU TD: Ethan Champney 20-yard pass from Will Ark (kick)
  HILL 24–21; 6 plays, 88 yards, 2:13
- (00:40) MTU TD: Ethan Champney 12-yard pass from Will Ark (kick)
  MTU 28–24; 9 plays, 72 yards, 1:33

Passing

- MTU – Will Ark: 26/38, 314 yards, 3 TD
- HILL – Luke Keller: 16/28, 247 yards, 2 TD, 1 INT

Rushing

- MTU – William Marano: 16 carries, 56 yards
- HILL – Luke Keller: 17 carries, 62 yards

Receiving

- MTU – Darius Willis: 10 receptions, 150 yards
- HILL – Isaac TeSlaa: 6 receptions, 166 yards, 2 TD

Michigan Tech scored first on a four-yard rushing touchdown by Will Ark. Each team exchanged a touchdown before Hillsdale kicked a 27-yard field goal as time expired in the second quarter. Michigan Tech fumbled in the third quarter, and a Charger recovered the ball and returned it 40 yards for a touchdown to put Hillsdale in the lead. Hillsdale scored again early in the fourth quarter, but Michigan Tech scored the last 14 points of the game, scoring the game-winning touchdown with 40 seconds remaining in the game.

==== Saginaw Valley State ====
Week Ten: Michigan Tech at Saginaw Valley State – Game summary

Quarter	1	2	3	4	Total
Michigan Tech	3	6	7	14	30
Saginaw Valley State	0	7	14	14	35

at Harvey Randall Wickes Memorial Stadium • University Center, MI

- Date: November 12, 2022
- Game time: 1:00 p.m.
- Game weather: Cloudy
- Game attendance: 3,265
- Referee: Carl Chapman
- TV: FloSports

Game information

First Quarter

- (11:21) MTU FG: Drew Wyble 24-yard Field Goal
  MTU 3–0; 4 plays, 67 yards, 2:17

Second Quarter

- (06:41) SVSU TD: Tyler Amos 2-yard run (kick)
  SVSU 10–3; 10 plays, 60 yards, 3:05
- (02:25) MTU TD: Darius Willis 8-yard pass from Will Ark
  MTU 9–7; 8 plays, 62 yards, 4:09

Third Quarter

- (12:39) MTU TD: Darius Willis 52-yard pass from Will Ark (kick)
  MTU 16–7; 6 plays, 75 yards, 2:17
- (04:21) SVSU TD: Isaiah Malcome 4-yard run (kick)
  MTU 16–14; 11 plays, 65 yards, 4:04
- (01:49) SVSU TD: Derrick Hinton Jr 63-yard pass from Andrew Brito (kick)
  SVSU 21–16; 4 plays, 60 yards, 1:21

Fourth Quarter

- (11:04) SVSU TD: Micah Cretsinger 68-yard pick six (kick)
  SVSU 28–16
- (08:21) MTU TD: Will Ark 2-yard run (kick)
  SVSU 28–23; 9 plays, 75 yards, 2:43
- (02:09) SVSU TD: Tyler Amos 1-yard run (kick)
  SVSU 35–23; 12 plays, 73 yards, 6:12
- (00:52) MTU TD: Ethan Champney 2-yard pass from Will Ark (kick)
  SVSU 35–30; 9 plays, 72 yards, 1:33

Passing

- MTU – Will Ark: 27/41, 353 yards, 3 TD, 1 INT
- SVSU – Andrew Brito: 27/36, 324 yards, 1 TD, 2 INT

Rushing

- MTU – Will Ark: 7 carries, 25 yards, 1 TD
- SVSU – Isaiah Malcome: 11 carries, 46 yards, 1 TD

Receiving

- MTU – Darius Willis: 13 receptions, 198 yards, 2 TD
- SVSU – Derrick Hinton Jr: 13 receptions, 203 yards, 1 TD

Michigan Tech took an early lead with a field goal in the first quarter. Saginaw Valley took the lead with a touchdown in the second quarter. Michigan Tech retook the lead on a touchdown with 2:25 left in the first half. Michigan Tech led, 9–3, at halftime. In the third quarter, Michigan Tech exended its lead with a 52-yard touchdown pass from Will Ark to Darius Willis. The momentum then shifted to Sagainaw Valley, as the Cardinals scored 21 consecutive points. The last of Saginaw Valley's scores came when Ark threw a pick six four minutes into the fourth quarter, giving the Cardinals a 28–16 lead. Michigan Tech was able to rebound, scoring 14 of the next 21 points. The Huskies scored their final touchdown with 52 seconds left, pulling within five points. The Huskies' attempted an onside kick, but Saginaw Valley recovered to seal the victory.

== 2023 ==
2023 Michigan Tech Huskies football
- Conference: Great Lakes Intercollegiate Athletic Conference
- Record: 5–5 (1–5 GLIAC)
- Head coach: Dan Mettlach (1st season)
- Home stadium: Kearly Stadium

2023 Great Lakes Intercollegiate Athletic Conference football standings
	Conf.			Overall
Team	W		L	W		L
No. 3 Grand Valley State $^	6	–	0	11	–	2
No. 9 Ferris State ^	5	–	1	8	–	3
Davenport	4	–	2	8	–	2
Saginaw Valley State	3	–	3	6	–	5
Wayne State (MI)	2	–	4	3	–	8
Michigan Tech	1	–	5	5	–	5
Northern Michigan	0	–	6	0	–	11
$ – Conference champion; ^ – NCAA Division II playoff participant; Rankings from AFCA poll

The 2023 Michigan Tech Huskies football team represented Michigan Tech University as a member of the Great Lakes Intercollegiate Athletic Conference (GLIAC) during the 2023 NCAA Division II football season. In their first year under head coach Dan Mettlach, the Huskies compiled a 5–5 record (1–5 in conference games), finished sixth in the GLIAC, and were outscored by a total of 239 to 179.

Mettlach had been an assistant head coach since 2019. He replaced Steve Olson who was fired after the Huskies' disappointing 2022 season.

=== Schedule ===
Date	Time	Opponent	Site	TV	Result	Attendance
September 9	1:00 p.m.	Hillsdale*	Klearly Stadium; Houghton, MI	FloSports	W 45–20	2,188
September 16	2:00 p.m.	at Wisconsin–Platteville*	Pioneer Stadium; Platteville, WI		W 24–20	3,987
September 23	2:00 p.m.	at Upper Iowa*	Harms-Eisched Stadium; Fayette, IA		W 34–31	1,700
September 30	1:00 p.m.	No. 18 Davenport^{†}	Klearly Stadium; Houghton, MI	FloSports	L 0–28	2,600
October 7	1:00 p.m.	at Wayne State (MI)	Tom Adams Field; Detroit, MI	FloSports	L 21–23	3,021
October 14	7:00 p.m.	at Northern Michigan	Superior Dome; Marquette, MI (Miner's Cup)	FloSports/WLUC	W 62–0	5,907
October 21	1:00 p.m.	No. 9 Ferris State	Klearly Stadium; Houghton, MI	FloSports	L 21–35	1,233
October 28	3:00 p.m	at No. 3 Grand Valley State	Lubbers Stadium; Allendale, MI	FloSports	L 13–44	13,014
November 4	1:00 p.m.	Minot State*	Klearly Stadium; Houghton, MI	FloSports	W 37–3	
November 11	1:00 p.m	Saginaw Valley State	Klearly Stadium; Houghton, MI		L 21–38	1,191
*Non-conference game; ^{†}Homecoming; Rankings from AFCA Poll released prior to the game; All times are in Eastern time

=== Coaching staff ===
Name	Position	Season
Dan Mettlach	Head coach	1st
Phil Milbrath	Running backs coach/special teams coordinator	7th
Bryan Thomas	Defensive coordinator/linebackers	14th
Jack Rustman	Offensive line coach	2nd
JT Jurasin	Linebackers coach	1st
Kellen O'Neill	Wide receivers coach	1st
Michael Donnelly	Defensive backs coach	1st
Ken Klein	Defensive line coach	11th
Blake Hewitt	Assistant offensive line coach	1st
Adrian Saterstad	Assistant linebackers coach	1st

=== Game summaries ===
==== Hillsdale ====
Week One: Hillsdale Chargers at Michigan Tech – Game summary

Quarter	1	2	3	4	Total
Hillsdale	3	3	7	7	20
Michigan Tech	7	21	14	3	45

at Klearly Stadium • Houghton, MI

- Date: September 9, 2023
- Game time: 1:00 p.m.
- Game weather: Sunny
- Game attendance: 2,188
- Referee: Carl Chapman
- TV: FloSports

Game information

First quarter

- (06:41) MTU TD: Ethan Champney 12-yard pass from Alex Fries (kick)
  MTU 7–0; 6 plays, 68 yards, 2:27
- (00:57) HIL FG: Julian Lee 31-yard Field Goal
  MTU 7–3; 12 plays, 47 yards, 5:36

Second quarter

- (12:21) MTU TD: Darius Willis 7-yard pass from Alex Fries (kick)
  MTU 14–3; 10 plays, 75 yards, 3:36
- (10:49) MTU TD: Samuel Kinne 47-yard fumble recovery (kick)
  MTU 21–3; 0 plays, 0 yards, 0:00
- (05:32) HIL FG: Julian Lee 38-yard Field Goal
  MTU 21–6; 9 plays, 37 yards, 5:12
- (01:56) MTU TD: Ethan Campney 28-yard pass from Josh Byers (kick)
  MTU 28–6; 9 plays, 75 yards, 3:34

Third quarter

- (10:04) MTU TD: Drew Collins 15-yard pass from Alex Fries (kick)
  MTU 35–6; 1 plays, 15 yards, 0:04
- (02:31) HIL TD: Michael Herzog 2-yard run (kick)
  MTU 35–13; 13 plays, 73 yards, 7:28
- (00:30) MTU TD: Kolby Hindenach 30-yard run (kick)
  MTU 42–13; 5 plays, 75 yards, 2:00

Fourth quarter

- (08:35) HIL TD: Garrit Aissen 1-yard run (kick)
  MTU 42–20; 7 plays, 38 yards, 2:56
- (03:30) MTU FG: Drew Wyble 27-yard Field Goal
  MTU 45–20; 9 plays, 63 yards, 4:57

Passing

- MTU – Alex Fries: 18/27, 258 yards, 3 TD
- HIL – Garrit Aissen: 19/32, 115 yards, 2 INT

Rushing

- MTU – Kobly Hindenach: 8 carries, 72 yards, 1 TD
- HIL – Michael Herzog: 28 carries, 106 yards, 1 TD

Receiving

- MTU – Ethan Champney: 7 receptions, 148 yards, 2 TD
- HIL – Logan VanEnkevort: 4 receptions, 38 yards

==== At Wisconsin–Platteville ====
Week Two: Michigan Tech at UW Platteville – Game summary

Quarter	1	2	3	4	Total
Michigan Tech	7	14	0	3	24
UW Platteville	0	14	6	0	20

at Pioneer Stadium • Platteville, WI

- Date: September 16, 2023
- Game time: 1:00 p.m.
- Game weather: Sunny
- Game attendance: 3,987
- Referee: Kole Knueppel
- TV: FloSports

Game information

First quarter

- (10:50) MTU TD: Ethan Champney 8-yard pass from Alex Fries (kick)
  MTU 7–0; 7 plays, 78 yards, 1:39

Second quarter

- (09:25) UWP TD: Brandt Stare 89-yard pass from Carl Richardson (kick)
  MTU 7–7; 2 plays, 90 yards, 0:47
- (06:28) MTU TD: Kolby Hindenach 1-yard run (kick)
  MTU 14–7; 1 plays, 1 yards, 0:05
- (02:29) UWP TD: Jett Gillum 1-yard pass from Justin Blazek
  Tied 14–14; 10 plays, 80 yards, 3:54
- (00:18) MTU TD: Alex Fries 7-yard run (kick)
  MTU 21–14; 5 plays, 53 yards, 0:39

Third quarter

- (10:28) UWP FG: Andrew Schweigert 31-yard Field Goal
  MTU 21–17; 7 plays, 52 yards, 1:33
- (07:01) UWP FG: Andrew Schweigert 41-yard Field Goal
  MTU 21–20; 6 plays, 43 yards, 2:10

Fourth quarter

- (12:42) MTU FG: Drew Wyble 19-yard Field Goal
  MTU 24–20; 8 plays, 27 yards, 2:45

Passing

- MTU – Alex Fries: 27/44, 288 yards, 1 TD, 2 INT
- UWP – Carl Richardson: 14/33, 232 yards, 1 TD, 3 INT

Rushing

- MTU – William Marano: 20 carries, 59 yards
- UWP – Zachary Bothun: 12 carries, 47 yards

Receiving

- MTU – Ethan Champney: 11 receptions, 143 yards, 1 TD
- UWP – Brandt Stare: 7 receptions, 143 yards, 1 TD

==== At Upper Iowa ====
Week Three: Michigan Tech at Upper Iowa – Game summary

Quarter	1	2	3	4	Total
Michigan Tech	0	7	7	20	34
Upper Iowa	10	14	7	0	31

at Pioneer Stadium • Fayette, IA

- Date: September 23, 2023
- Game time: 1:00 p.m.
- Game weather: Cloudy
- Game attendance: 1,700
- Referee: David Green

Game information

First quarter

- (10:29) UIU TD: Mante Morrow 13-yard pass from Marcus Orr (kick)
  UIU 7–0; 3 plays, 12 yards, 0:57
- (08:34) UIU FG: Thomas Forte 44-yard Field Goal
  UIU 10–0; 13 plays, 41 yards, 0:21

Second quarter

- (11:10) UIU TD: Eddie Burgess 23-yard pass from Marcus Orr (kick)
  UTU 17–0; 2 plays, 96 yards, 3:20
- (08:03) UIU TD: RJ Wells 8-yard run (kick)
  UIU 24–0; 6 plays, 33 yards, 3:09
- (02:58) MTU TD: Michael Bates Jr 0-yard INT return
  UIU 24–7; 0 plays, 0 yards, 0:00

Third quarter

- (12:12) MTU TD: William Marano 5-yard run
  UIU 24–14; 7 plays, 75 yards, 2:48
- (02:42) UIU TD: Michael Orr 1-yard run
  UIU 31–14; 7 plays, 50 yards, 5:52

Fourth quarter

- (14:54) MTU FG: Drew Wyble 49-yard Field Goal
  UIU 31–17; 10 plays, 43 yards, 2:48
- (11:11) MTU TD: Ethan Champney 73-yard pass from Alex Fries (kick)
  UIU 31–24; 1 plays, 73 yards, 0:11
- (07:42) MTU TD: Brandon Michalak 18-yard pass from Ethan Champney (kick)
  Tied 31–31; 3 plays, 32 yards, 1:13
- (00:36) MTU FG: Drew Wyble 30-yard Field Goal
  MTU 34–31; 9 plays, 47 yards, 2:08

Passing

- MTU – Alex Fries: 11/20, 131 yards, 1 TD, 3 INT
- UIU – Marcus Orr: 29/36, 328 yards, 2 TD, 2 INT

Rushing

- MTU – William Marano: 20 carries, 147 yards, 1 TD
- UIU – RJ Wells: 12 carries, 53 yards, 1 TD

Receiving

- MTU – Ethan Champney: 1 receptions, 73 yards, 1 TD
- UIU – Mante Morrow: 11 receptions, 141 yards, 1 TD

==== No. 18 Davenport ====
Week Four: Davenport at Michigan Tech – Game summary

Quarter	1	2	3	4	Total
Davenport	7	7	7	7	28
Michigan Tech	0	0	0	0	0

at Klearly Stadium • Houghton, MI

- Date: September 30, 2023
- Game time: 1:00 p.m.
- Game weather: Sunny
- Game attendance: 2,600
- Referee: Bryan Earl

Game information

First quarter

- (04:16) DU TD: Caleef Jenkins 7-yard run (kick)
  DU 7–0; 9 plays, 70 yards, 5:00

Second quarter

- (00:00) DU TD: Peyton Brown 5-yard pass from Jason Whittaker (kick)
  DU 14–0; 15 plays, 86 yards, 8:27

Third quarter

- (06:22) DU TD: Caleef Jenkins 1-yard run (kick)
  DU 21–0; 14 plays, 69 yards, 8:34

Fourth quarter

- (12:21) DU TD: Micah Wilson 72-yard punt return (kick)
  DU 28–0; 0 plays, 0 yards, 0:00

Passing

- MTU – Alex Fries: 9/25, 76 yards, 1 INT
- DU – Jason Whittaker: 14/23, 150 yards, 1 TD

Rushing

- MTU – Alex Fries: 6 carries, 22 yards
- DU – Myren Harris: 26 carries, 112 yards

Receiving

- MTU – Darius Willis: 5 receptions, 43 yards
- DU – Mante Morrow: 11 receptions, 141 yards, 1 TD

==== At Wayne State (MI) ====
Week Five: Michigan Tech at Wayne State – Game summary

Quarter	1	2	3	4	Total
Michigan Tech	0	7	7	7	21
Wayne State	3	7	7	6	23

at Adams Field • Detroit, MI

- Date: October 7, 2023
- Game time: 1:00 p.m.
- Game weather: Cloudy
- Game attendance: 3,021
- Referee: Bradley Mutnick

Game information

First quarter

- (08:10) WSU FG: Griffin Milovanski 22-yard Field Goal
  WSU 3–0; 13 plays, 86 yards, 6:46

Second quarter

- (12:06) MTU TD: William Marano 5-yard run (kick)
  MTU 7–3; 8 plays, 46 yards, 3:03
- (06:34) WSU TD: Kendall Williams 1-yard run (kick)
  WSU 10–7; 11 plays, 74 yards, 5:25

Third quarter

- (12:06) MTU TD: Darius Willis 45-yard pass from Alex Fries (kick)
  MTU 14–10; 6 plays, 56 yards, 2:54
- (07:18) WSU TD: Eli McLean 1-yard run (kick)
  WSU 17–14; 8 plays, 63 yards, 4:39

Fourth quarter

- (11:58) WSU FG: Griffin Milovanski 47-yard Field Goal
  WSU 20–14; 11 plays, 50 yards, 5:25
- (07:32) WSU FG: Griffin Milovanski 38-yard Field Goal
  WSU 23–14; 6 plays, 43 yards, 2:58
- (07:20) MTU TD: Ethan Champney 70-yard pass from Alex Fries (kick)
  WSU 23–21; 1 plays, 70 yards, 0:12

Passing

- MTU – Alex Fries: 9/25, 76 yards, 1 INT
- DU – Jason Whittaker: 14/23, 150 yards, 1 TD

Rushing

- MTU – Alex Fries: 6 carries, 22 yards
- DU – Myren Harris: 26 carries, 112 yards

Receiving

- MTU – Darius Willis: 5 receptions, 43 yards
- DU – Mante Morrow: 11 receptions, 141 yards, 1 TD

==== At Northern Michigan ====
Week Six: Michigan Tech at Northern Michigan – Game summary

Quarter	1	2	3	4	Total
Michigan Tech	17	14	24	7	62
Northern Michigan	0	0	0	0	0

at Superior Dome • Marquette, MI

- Date: October 14, 2023
- Game time: 7:00 p.m.
- Game weather: Indoor
- Game attendance: 5,907
- Referee: Carl Chapman

Game information

First quarter

- (07:53) MTU TD: William Marano 3-yard run (kick)
  MTU 7–0; 13 plays, 79 yards, 6:58
- (06:18) MTU TD: Darius Willis 14-yard pass from Alex Fries (kick)
  MTU 14–0; 1 plays, 9 yards, 0:08
- (01:21) MTU FG: Drew Wyble 30-yard Field Goal
  MTU 17–0; 6 plays, 19 yards, 3:20

Second quarter

- (02:28) MTU TD: William Marano 12-yard run (kick)
  MTU 24–0; 3 plays, 75 yards, 1:43
- (00:53) MTU TD: Alex Fries 4-yard run (kick)
  MTU 31–0; 3 plays, 32 yards, 1:33

Third quarter

- (11:35) MTU TD: Alex Fries 25-yard run (kick)
  MTU 38–0; 4 plays, 60 yards, 2:15
- (09:46) MTU TD: Darius Willis 25-yard pass from Alex Fries (kick)
  MTU 45–0; 3 plays, 37 yards, 1:36
- (09:25) MTU TD: Hunter Beuchel 22-yard Fumble recovery (kick)
  MTU 52–0
- (02:56) MTU FG: Drew Wyble 39-yard Field Goal
  MTU 55–0; 9 plays, 42 yards, 4:24

Fourth quarter

- (00:47) MTU TD: Jake Rueff 3-yard run (kick)
  MTU 62–0; 6 plays, 37 yards, 1:43

Passing

- MTU – Alex Fries: 15/21, 240 yards, 2 TD
- NMU – Aiden Hoard: 19/31, 131 yards, 2 INT

Rushing

- MTU – Alex Fries: 11 carries, 74 yards, 2 TD
- NMU – Brock Franklin: 5 carries, 7 yards

Receiving

- MTU – Darius Willis: 10 receptions, 202 yards, 2 TD
- NMU – Franko Williams: 3 receptions, 29 yards

==== No. 9 Ferris State ====
Week Seven: Ferris State at Michigan Tech – Game summary

Quarter	1	2	3	4	Total
Ferris State	7	14	7	7	35
Michigan Tech	0	7	14	0	21

at Klearly Stadium • Houghton, MI

- Date: October 21, 2023
- Game time: 1:00 p.m.
- Game weather: Cloudy
- Game attendance: 1,233
- Referee: Jayson Dibble

Game information

First quarter

- (12:24) FSU TD: Carson Gulker 12-yard run (kick)
  FSU 7–0; 5 plays, 78 yards, 2:31

Second quarter

- (13:24) FSU TD: Carson Gulker 15-yard run (kick)
  FSU 14–0; 1 plays, 15 yards, 0:05
- (11:59) MTU TD: Drew Collins 20-yard run (kick)
  FSU 14–7; 4 plays, 83 yards, 1:22
- (03:20) FSU TD: Cason Gulker 4-yard run (kick)
  FSU 21–7; 4 plays, 83 yards, 2:03

Third quarter

- (09:25) MTU TD: Alex Fries 9-yard run (kick)
  FSU 21–14; 11 plays, 75 yards, 5:35
- (05:31) FSU TD: Cason Gulker 3-yard run (kick)
  FSU 28–14; 7 plays, 70 yards, 3:50
- (02:31) MTU TD: Ethan Champney 43-yard pass from Alex Fries (kick)
  FSU 28–21; 6 plays, 75 yard, 3:00

Fourth quarter

- (10:16) FSU TD: Cason Gulker 3-yard run (kick)
  MTU 35–21; 17 plays, 74 yards, 7:07

Passing

- MTU – Alex Fries: 23/40, 326 yards, 1 TD, 1 INT
- FSU – Aiden Hoard: 6/11, 107 yards

Rushing

- MTU – Alex Fries: 9 carries, 40 yards, 1 TD
- FSU – Carson Gulker: 28 carries, 120 yards, 5 TD

Receiving

- MTU – Darius Willis: 5 receptions, 81 yards
- FSU – Xavier Wade: 6 receptions, 134 yards

== 2024 ==
2024 Michigan Tech Huskies football
- Conference: Great Lakes Intercollegiate Athletic Conference
- Record: 7–4 (4–3 GLIAC)
- Head coach: Dan Mettlach (2nd season)
- Home stadium: Kearly Stadium

2024 Great Lakes Intercollegiate Athletic Conference football standings
	Conf.			Overall
Team	W		L	W		L
No. 1 Ferris State $^	7	–	0	14	–	1
No. 6 Grand Valley State ^	6	–	1	11	–	2
Davenport	4	–	3	7	–	4
Michigan Tech	4	–	3	7	–	4
Saginaw Valley State	4	–	3	7	–	4
Wayne State (MI)	2	–	5	2	–	9
Roosevelt*	1	–	6	1	–	9
Northern Michigan	0	–	7	0	–	11
$ – Conference champion; ^ – NCAA Division II playoff participant; * – Roosevelt ineligible for postseason play due to transition from NAIA; Rankings from AFCA poll

The 2024 Michigan Tech Huskies football team represented Michigan Tech University as a member of the Great Lakes Intercollegiate Athletic Conference (GLIAC) during the 2024 NCAA Division II football season. In their second year under head coach Dan Mettlach, the Huskies compiled a 7–4 record (4–3 in conference games), finished in a three-way tie for third place in the GLIAC, and outscored opponents by a total of 276 to 228.

The team's statistical leaders included Alex Fries (2,215 passing yards, 118.97 passer rating), Darius Willis (61 receptions for 757 yards), Jake Rueff (571 rushing yards), and Avery Kucharski (57 points on 24 extra points and 11 field goals).

Six Michigan Tech players received first-team honors on the 2024 All-GLIAC football team: wide receivers Ethan Champney and Darius Willis; defensive linemen Josh Cribben and Austin Schlicht; linebacker Hunter Buechel; and punter Brenden Lach.

=== Schedule ===
Date	Time	Opponent	Site	TV	Result	Attendance	Source
August 29	7:00 p.m.	at No. 25 Bemidji State*	Chet Anderson Stadium; Bemidji, MN		L 13–19 ^{OT}	0	
September 5	6:00 p.m.	South Dakota Mines*	Kearly Stadium; Houghton, MI	FloSports	W 52–50 ^{4OT}	1,317	
September 14	12:00 p.m.	Hillsdale*	Kearly Stadium; Houghton, MI	FloSports	W 21–6	1,705	
September 21	1:00 p.m.	at No. 13 Wisconsin–Oshkosh*	J. J. Keller Field at Titan Stadium; Oshkosh, WI		W 44–7	1,949	
October 5	12:00 p.m.	Wayne State (MI)^{†}	Kearly Stadium; Houghton, MI	FloSports	W 22–7	1,974	
October 12	12:00 p.m.	Davenport	Kearly Stadium; Houghton, MI	FloSports	L 20–24	1,231	
October 19	1:00 p.m.	at No. 4 Ferris State	Big Rapids, MI	FloSports	L 13–51	4,720	
October 26	12:00 p.m.	Northern Michigan	Kearly Stadium; Houghton, MI (Miner's Cup)	FloSports	W 39–9	1,984	
November 2	2:00 p.m.	at Roosevelt	Chicago, IL	FloSports	W 20–7	856	
November 9	12:00 p.m.	No. 5 Grand Valley State	Kearly Stadium; Houghton, MI	FloSports	L 0–20	1,294	
November 16	1:00 p.m.	at Saginaw Valley State	Wickes Stadium; University Center, MI	FloSports	W 32–28	2,968	
*Non-conference game; ^{†}Homecoming; Rankings from AFCA Poll released prior to the game; All times are in Eastern time

== 2025 ==
2025 Michigan Tech Huskies football
- Conference: Great Lakes Intercollegiate Athletic Conference
- Record: 7–4 (4–3 GLIAC)
- Head coach: Dan Mettlach (3rd season)
- Home stadium: Kearly Stadium

2025 Great Lakes Intercollegiate Athletic Conference football standings
	Conf.			Overall
Team	W		L	W		L
No. 1 Ferris State $^	7	–	0	16	–	0
Grand Valley State	5	–	2	7	–	3
Saginaw Valley State	5	–	2	6	–	5
Michigan Tech	4	–	3	7	–	4
Davenport	4	–	3	5	–	5
Northern Michigan	2	–	5	3	–	8
Roosevelt*	1	–	6	2	–	8
Wayne State (MI)	0	–	7	0	–	11
$ – Conference champion; ^ – NCAA Division II playoff participant; * – Roosevelt ineligible for postseason play due to transition from NAIA; Rankings from AFCA poll

The 2025 Michigan Tech Huskies football team represent Michigan Tech University as a member of the Great Lakes Intercollegiate Athletic Conference (GLIAC) during the 2025 NCAA Division II football season. They are led by Dan Mettlach in his third year as head coach.

On February 5, 2025, Michigan Tech announced the signing of 28 players, including defensive lineman Ruebyn Mensah (South Range MI), outside linebacker Lane Gorzinski (Powers, MI), and offensive lineman Kevin Giuliani (Crystal Falls, MI).

=== Schedule ===
Date	Time	Opponent	Site	TV	Result	Attendance	Source
August 28	6:00 p.m.	No. 16 Bemidji State*	Kearly Stadium; Houghton, MI	FloSports	W 37–17	1,976	
September 4	8:00p.m.	at South Dakota Mines*	O'Harra Stadium; Rapid City, SD		W 45–9	2,062	
September 13	1:00 p.m.	at Hillsdale*	Muddy Waters Stadium; Hillsdale, MI	FloSports	W 34–21	1,728	
September 20	4:00 p.m.	Upper Iowa*^{†}	Kearly Stadium; Houghton, MI	FloSports	L 14–21	2,791	
October 4	1:00 p.m.	at Wayne State (MI)	Tom Adams Field; Detroit, MI	FloSports	W 48–24	1,932	
October 11	2:00 p.m.	at Davenport	Grand Rapids, MI	FloSports	W 16–14	1,837	
October 18	12:00 p.m.	No. 1 Ferris State	Kearly Stadium; Houghton, MI	FloSports	L 10–38	1,635	
October 25	12:00 p.m.	at Northern Michigan	Superior Dome; Marquette, MI (Miner's Cup)	FloSports	W 56–17	4,468	
November 1	12:00 p.m.	Roosevelt	Kearly Stadium; Houghton, MI	FloSports	W 56–31	1,263	
November 8	2:00 p.m.	at No. 23 Grand Valley State	Lubbers Stadium; Allendale, MI	FloSports	L 15–18	11,394	
November 15	12:00 p.m.	Saginaw Valley State	Kearly Stadium; Houghton, MI	FloSports	L 21–24	1,282	
*Non-conference game; ^{†}Homecoming; Rankings from AFCA Poll released prior to the game; All times are in Eastern time
