= Dan Mettlach =

American football coach (born April 25, 1981)

Current position
- Title: Head coach
- Team: Michigan Tech
- Conference: GLIAC
- Record: 29-15

Biographical details
- Born: April 25, 1981 (age 45); Gwinn, Michigan, U.S.
- Education: Michigan Technological University (2005); Eastern Michigan University (2012)

Playing career
- 2001–2004: Michigan Tech
- 2005: Evansville BlueCats
- Position: Quarterback

Coaching career (HC unless noted)
- 2006: Eastern Michigan (GA)
- 2007–2010: Northern Michigan (QB/WR)
- 2011: Hillsdale (QB)
- 2012–2013: Macalester (ST/QB)
- 2014–2015: Finlandia (AHC/OC)
- 2016–2018: Michigan Tech (AHC/OC)
- 2019–2022: Michigan Tech (AHC)
- 2023–present: Michigan Tech

Administrative career (AD unless noted)
- 2010: Dexter HS (MI)

Head coaching record
- Overall: 29-15
- Tournaments: 1-0

Accomplishments and honors

Awards
- GLIAC Offensive Player of the Year (2004) GLIAC Coach of the Year (2025)

Daniel Mettlach (born April 25, 1981) is an American college football coach. He is the head football coach for Michigan Technological University, a position he has held since 2023. He also coached for Eastern Michigan, Northern Michigan, Hillsdale, Macalester, and Finlandia. He played high school football for the Gwinn Modeltowners as a quarterback, college football for Michigan Tech and professionally for the Evansville BlueCats of the United Indoor Football (UFL).

== Head coaching record ==
Year	Team	Overall	Conference	Standing	Bowl/playoffs
Michigan Tech Huskies (Great Lakes Intercollegiate Athletic Conference) (2023–present)
2023	Michigan Tech	5–5	1–5	6th	
2024	Michigan Tech	7–4	4–3	T–3rd	
2025	Michigan Tech	7–4	4–3	T–4th	
2026	Michigan Tech	10–2	6–1	2nd	NCAA Division II Second Round
Michigan tech:		29–15	15–12		
Total:		29–15			
