= Jace Daniels =

American football player and coach (born 1989)

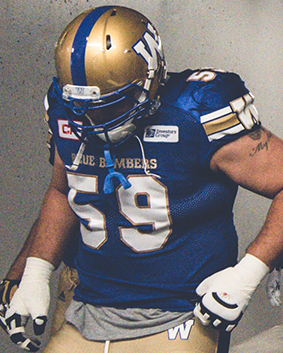
- Daniels in 2016

Profile
- Positions: Center, offensive guard

Personal information
- Born: March 3, 1989 (age 37); Escanaba, Michigan, U.S.
- Listed height: 6 ft 4 in (1.93 m)
- Listed weight: 315 lb (143 kg)

Career information
- High school: Escanaba (MI)
- College: Northern Michigan
- NFL draft: 2013: undrafted

Career history

Playing
- Tampa Bay Buccaneers (2013–2014)*; Winnipeg Blue Bombers (2014–2015); Baltimore Brigade (2017)
- * Offseason or practice squad member only

Coaching
- Northern Michigan (2017–2018) Offensive line coach; Michigan Tech (2019–2021) Offensive line coach; Big Foot HS (WI) (2022–2023) Head coach

Awards and highlights
- As player: First-team All-GLIAC (2012); Second-team All-GLIAC (2011)
- Stats at Pro Football Reference
- Stats at CFL.ca (archive)
- Stats at ArenaFan.com

Jace Daniels (born March 3, 1989) is an American football college coach. He had played professionally as an offensive tackle.

== Playing career ==
=== College ===
Daniels played college football at Northern Michigan.

=== Professional ===
==== Tampa Bay Buccaneers ====
Daniels signed with the Tampa Bay Buccaneers and remained on the practice squad throughout the 2013 season. He continues with the Bucs for the 2014 season and awaits camp which will decide when the player moves up to 2nd string. The Buccaneers released Daniels on August 24, 2014.

==== Winnipeg Blue Bombers ====
Daniels was signed by the Winnipeg Blue Bombers on October 7, 2014.

==== Baltimore Brigade ====
Daniels was assigned to the Baltimore Brigade on February 7, 2017.

== Coaching career ==
Daniels began his college coaching career as the offensive line coach at his alma mater, Northern Michigan, in 2017 and 2018. He then moved to Michigan Tech in 2019, where he resumed being the offensive line coach. In 2022, he was hired as the head football coach for Big Foot High School. He went 1–16 in two seasons and resigned after the 2023 season.

== Head coaching record ==
Year	Team	Overall	Conference	Standing	Bowl/playoffs
Big Foot Chiefs () (2022–2023)
2022	Big Foot	1–8	0–7	8th	
2023	Big Foot	0–8	0–6	8th	
Big Foot:		1–16	0–13		
Total:		1–16			
