= Caledonia Township, Kent County, Michigan =

Caledonia Township, Michigan
- Charter township
- Charter Township of Caledonia
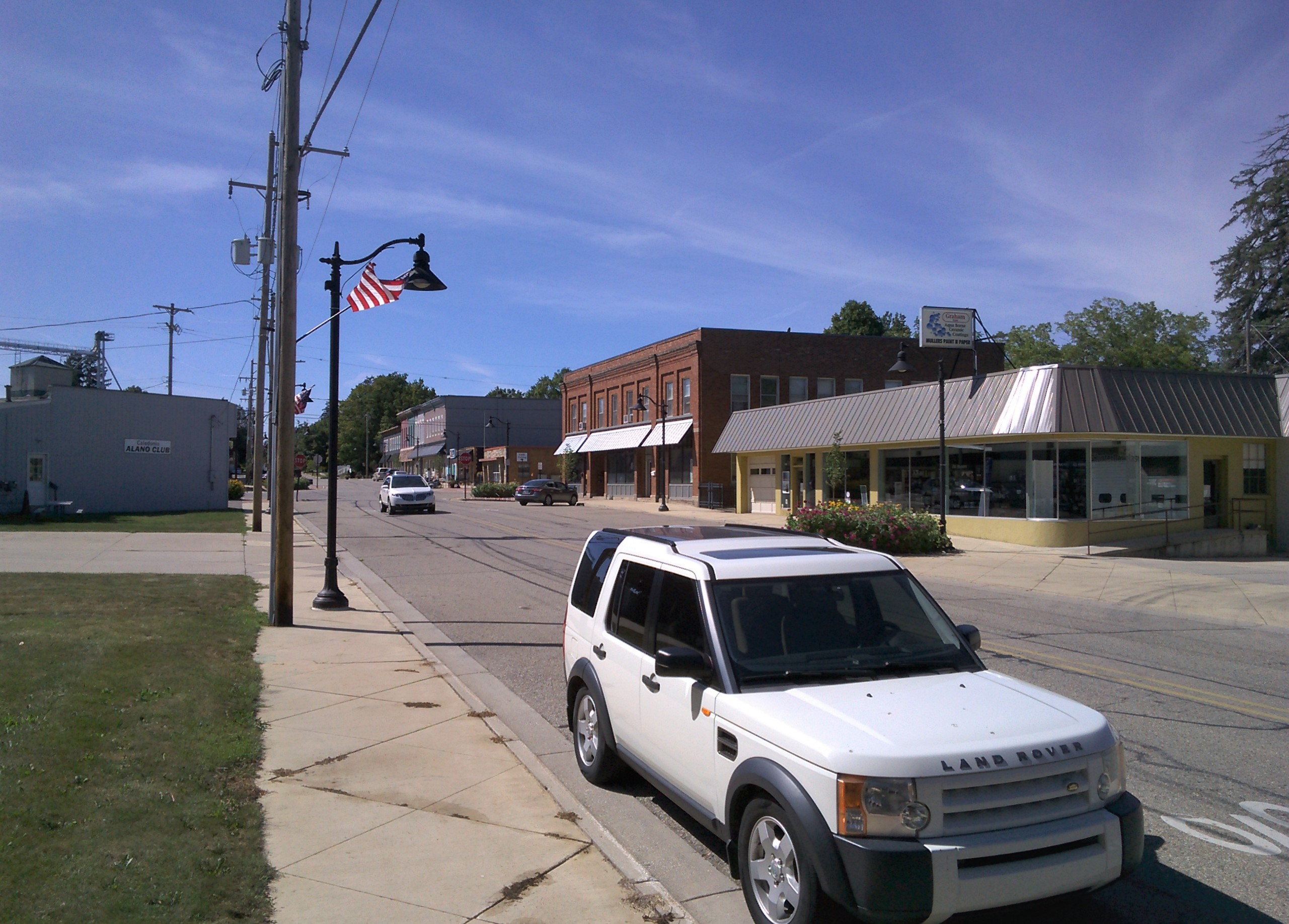
- The village of Caledonia within the township

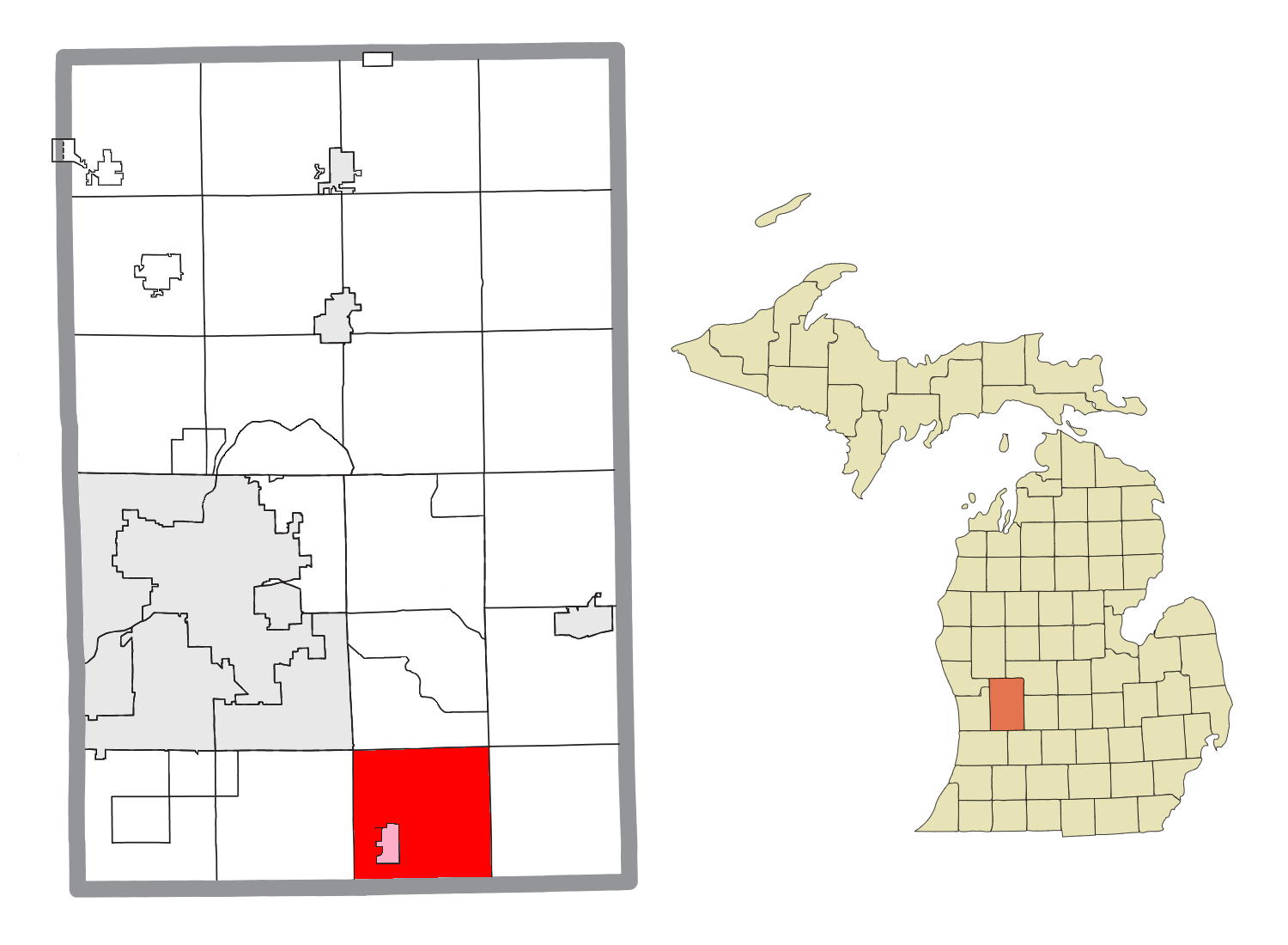
- Location within Kent County (red) and the administered village of Caledonia (pink)

- Location within the state of Michigan Location within the United States
- Coordinates: 42°48′47″N 85°29′09″W
- Country: United States
- State: Michigan
- County: Kent
- Established: 1838

Government
  - Supervisor: Bryan Harrison
  - Clerk: Joni Henry

Area
  - Total: 35.70 sq mi (92.46 km^{2})
  - Land: 34.91 sq mi (90.42 km^{2})
  - Water: 0.79 sq mi (2.05 km^{2})
- Elevation: 719 ft (219 m)

Population (2020)
  - Total: 15,811
  - Density: 452.9/sq mi (174.9/km^{2})
- Time zone: UTC-5 (Eastern (EST))
  - Summer (DST): UTC-4 (EDT)
- ZIP code(s): 49302 (Alto); 49316 (Caledonia)
- Area code: 616
- FIPS code: 26-081-12500
- GNIS feature ID: 1626020
- Website: Official website

Caledonia Charter Township is a charter township of Kent County in the U.S. state of Michigan. The population was 15,811 at the 2020 census, an increase from 12,332 at the 2010 census.

The township was organized as a survey township in 1838. It is part of the Grand Rapids metropolitan area and is located about 10 miles (16 km) southeast of the city of Grand Rapids.

== Communities ==
- Alaska is an unincorporated community within the township on the Thornapple River at 42°50′24″N 85°28′41″W. The community had its origin with a sawmill established by William H. Brown and Rev. Eber Moffit in 1848. A post office with the name "Brownsville" was first established on December 13, 1855, but the name was changed to "North Brownsville" just a few days later on December 18 to avoid confusion with an already existing post office with that name in Cass County. It was renamed "Alaska" on December 4, 1868, undoubtedly influenced by the 1867 purchase of Alaska from Russia by the U.S. government. The post office closed on February 9, 1906.
- Caledonia is a village within the township on M-37 in the southeast part of the township.
- Caledonia Station was a settlement founded around a depot of the Grand River Valley Railroad in 1870. It was platted that same year.

== Geography ==
According to the U.S. Census Bureau, the township has a total area of 35.70 square miles (92.46 km^{2}), of which 34.91 square miles (90.42 km^{2}) is land and 0.79 square miles (2.05 km^{2}) (2.21%) is water.

The Thornapple River flows north through the center of the township. The Coldwater River enters at the southeast corner flowing east and merges with Thornapple River.

=== Major highways ===
- M-6 is an expressway that runs through the northwest corner of the township and has an interchange with M-37.
- M-37 (Broadmoor Avenue and Cherry Valley Avenue) runs south–north through the eastern portion of the township.

== Education ==
The entire township is served by Caledonia Community Schools, which also serves a larger area that includes portions of several townships and a small portion of the city of Kentwood to the northwest.

== History ==
Caledonia Township was formed in 1840 from Vergennes Township (Township 5 North, Range 9 West) and Ada Township (Township 5 North, Range 10 West). Bowne Township (Township 5 North, Range 9 West) was later formed from Caledonia Township in 1849.

== Demographics ==
As of the 2000 census, there were 8,964 people, 3,075 households, and 2,493 families residing in the township. The population density was 255.0 inhabitants per square mile (98.5/km^{2}). There were 3,225 housing units at an average density of 91.8 per square mile (35.4/km^{2}). The racial makeup of the township was 97.55% White, 0.25% African American, 0.31% Native American, 0.76% Asian, 0.03% Pacific Islander, 0.47% from other races, and 0.64% from two or more races. Hispanic or Latino of any race were 1.24% of the population.

There were 3,075 households, out of which 43.3% had children under the age of 18 living with them, 71.7% were married couples living together, 6.9% had a female householder with no husband present, and 18.9% were non-families. 15.0% of all households were made up of individuals, and 4.1% had someone living alone who was 65 years of age or older. The average household size was 2.91 and the average family size was 3.26.

In the township the population was spread out, with 31.3% under the age of 18, 6.8% from 18 to 24, 30.6% from 25 to 44, 24.1% from 45 to 64, and 7.3% who were 65 years of age or older. The median age was 35 years. For every 100 females, there were 101.0 males. For every 100 females age 18 and over, there were 99.6 males.

The median income for a household in the township was $63,032, and the median income for a family was $69,836. Males had a median income of $51,843 versus $30,032 for females. The per capita income for the township was $25,710. About 1.9% of families and 2.3% of the population were below the poverty line, including 1.9% of those under age 18 and 3.7% of those age 65 or over.
