= 2025 Harding Bisons football team =

American college football season

2025 Harding Bisons football

GAC champion

NCAA Division II Championship Game, L 21–42 vs. Ferris State
- Conference: Great American Conference

Ranking
- AFCA: No. 2
- Record: 15–1 (11–0 GAC)
- Head coach: Paul Simmons (9th season)
- Offensive scheme: Flexbone triple option
- Defensive coordinator: Roddy Mote (9th season)
- Co-defensive coordinator: Luke Tribble (9th season)
- Base defense: 3–4
- Home stadium: First Security Stadium

2025 Great American Conference football standings
	Conf.			Overall
Team	W		L	W		L
No. 2 Harding $^	11	–	0	15	–	1
Southern Arkansas	8	–	3	8	–	3
Henderson State	8	–	3	8	–	3
Ouachita Baptist	7	–	4	7	–	4
Arkansas Tech #	7	–	4	7	–	5
East Central #	6	–	5	6	–	6
SW Oklahoma State	6	–	5	6	–	5
SE Oklahoma State	5	–	6	5	–	6
Arkansas–Monticello	2	–	9	2	–	9
Oklahoma Baptist	2	–	9	2	–	9
NW Oklahoma State	2	–	9	2	–	9
Southern Nazarene	2	–	9	2	–	9
$ – Conference champion; ^ – NCAA Division II playoff participant; # – bowl participant (Arkansas Tech: Heritage Bowl, East Central: First Americans Bowl); Rankings from AFCA poll

The 2025 Harding Bisons football team represented Harding University in the 2025 NCAA Division II football season as a member of the Great American Conference (GAC). The Bisons were led by ninth-year head coach Paul Simmons and played their home games at First Security Stadium in Searcy, Arkansas.

The team entered the 2025 season as the 2024 GAC co-champions. They were undefeated in the 2025 regular season, winning the GAC conference outright.

In the NCAA Division II playoffs, Harding defeated Northwest Missouri State, Pittsburg State and UT–Permian Basin, on the way to the program's third playoff semifinals. Against UTPB, the Bisons' rushed for 389 yards, pushing their season total to 6,308 yards and eclipsing the all-division college football record of 6,160 yards set by the 2023 Harding squad. The Bisons also broke their own single-season record for rushing touchdowns, scoring four times on the ground to bring their season total to 80. In the semifinals, the Bisons defeated Kutztown to reach Harding's second national championship game in history. The next week, Harding lost to Ferris State 21–42.

On January 6, 2026, Coach Paul Simmons was promoted to the newly created position of general manager of the Bisons football program, and longtime assistant and defensive coordinator Roddy Mote was promoted to head coach.

== Preseason ==
The GAC released its preseason prediction poll on August 5, 2025. Harding was the preseason favorite to win the conference and received 9 of the 12 first-place votes, with Ouachita Baptist receiving the other 3 votes.

== Schedule ==
Date	Time	Opponent	Rank	Site	TV	Result	Attendance
September 4	6:00 p.m.	at Northwestern Oklahoma State	No. 2	Ranger Field; Alva, OK		W 49–7	500
September 11	7:00 p.m.	Southwestern Oklahoma State	No. 2	First Security Stadium; Searcy, AR		W 55–0	2,750
September 20	6:00 p.m.	at Southern Arkansas	No. 2	Memorial Stadium; El Dorado, AR		W 31–12	6,867
September 27	7:00 p.m.	Ouachita Baptist	No. 2	First Security Stadium; Searcy, AR		W 24–7	5,125
October 4	2:00 p.m.	East Central	No. 2	First Security Stadium; Searcy, AR		W 65–0	2,025
October 9	6:00 p.m.	at Southeastern Oklahoma State	No. 2	Paul Laird Field; Durant, OK		W 35–7	1,464
October 18	5:10 p.m.	at Henderson State	No. 2	Carpenter–Haygood Stadium; Arkadelphia, AR		W 35–10	3,722
October 25	2:00 p.m.	Arkansas–Monticello	No. 2	First Security Stadium; Searcy, AR		W 55–0	1,250
November 1	3:00 p.m.	Oklahoma Baptist^{†}	No. 2	First Security Stadium; Searcy, AR		W 69–0	3,050
November 8	2:00 p.m.	at Southern Nazarene	No. 2	SNU Stadium; Bethany, OK		W 52–14	2,754
November 15	2:00 p.m.	at Arkansas Tech	No. 2	Thone Stadium; Russellville, AR		W 47–13	4,713
November 22	1:00 p.m.	No. 14 Northwest Missouri State*	No. 2	First Security Stadium; Searcy, AR (NCAA Division II First Round)	ESPN+	W 38–16	3,225
November 29	1:00 p.m.	No. 6 Pittsburg State*	No. 2	First Security Stadium; Searcy, AR (NCAA Division II Second Round)	ESPN+	W 37–21	2,125
December 6	1:00 p.m.	No. 10 UT Permian Basin*	No. 2	First Security Stadium; Searcy, AR (NCAA Division II Quarterfinal)	ESPN+	W 34–28	2,775
December 13	2:30 p.m.	at No. 3 Kutztown*	No. 2	Andre Reed Stadium; Kutztown, PA (NCAA Division II Semifinal)	ESPN+	W 49–27	5,856
December 20	3:00 p.m.	vs. No. 1 Ferris State*	No. 2	McKinney ISD Stadium; McKinney, TX (NCAA Division II Championship Game)	ESPN2	L 21–42	10,521
*Non-conference game; ^{†}Homecoming; Rankings from AFCA Poll released prior to the game; All times are in Central time

== Rankings ==
Ranking movements Legend: ( ) = First-place votes
	Week													
Poll	Pre	1	2	3	4	5	6	7	8	9	10	11	12	Final
AFCA	2	2	2	2	2	2	2	2	2	2	2	2 (2)	2 (1)	2
D2 Football	2	2	2	2	2	2	2	2	2	2	2	2	2	2

== Game summaries ==
=== At Northwestern Oklahoma State ===
No. 2 Harding Bisons at Northwestern Oklahoma State Rangers – Game summary

Quarter	1	2	3	4	Total
No. 2 Bisons	21	14	7	7	49
Rangers	0	0	7	0	7

at Ranger Field, Alva, Oklahoma

- Date: September 4
- Game time: 6:00 p.m. CDT
- Game weather: Sunny, 82 °F (28 °C)
- Game attendance: 500
- Referee: Devin Simpson
- Box score, Recap

Game information
First quarter
- HAR – Braden Jay 45-yard run (Magnus Lepak kick), 10:00. Bisons 7–0. Drive: 8 plays, 74 yards, 4:55.
- HAR – Drew Porter 31-yard pass from Cole Keylan (Magnus Lepak kick), 6:52. Bisons 14–0. Drive: 4 plays, 73 yards, 2:11.
- HAR – Andrew Miller 31-yard run (Magnus Lepak kick), 0:41. Bisons 21–0. Drive: 7 plays, 82 yards, 3:51.

Second quarter

- HAR – Brandon Hines Jr. 12-yard run (Magnus Lepak kick), 5:26. Bisons 28–0. Drive: 9 plays, 59 yards, 5:55.
- HAR – Cole Keylan 1-yard run (Magnus Lepak kick), 1:58. Bisons 35–0. Drive: 3 plays, 37 yards, 1:15.

Third quarter

- HAR – Malik Young 23-yard run (Magnus Lepak kick), 9:57. Bisons 42–0. Drive: 4 plays, 48 yards, 2:18.
- NWO – Aiden Lewis 80-yard fumble return (Kale Purvis kick), 2:45. Bisons 42–7.

Fourth quarter

- HAR – Ben Boehm 49-yard run (Thomas Griffin kick), 11:41. Bisons 49–7. Drive: 3 plays, 55 yards, 1:29.

Statistics	HAR	NWO
First downs	26	3
Total yards	547	66
Rushing yards	484	27
Passing yards	63	39
Turnovers	2	0
Time of possession	34:48	25:12

Team	Category	Player	Statistics
Harding	Passing	Cole Keylan	2/3, 63 yards, TD
Harding	Rushing	Andrew Miller	12 rushes, 94 yards, TD
Harding	Receiving	Brady Barnett	1 reception, 32 yards
NW Oklahoma State	Passing	Gunner McElroy	5/9, 42 yards
NW Oklahoma State	Rushing	Caleb Deal	5 rushes, 17 yards
NW Oklahoma State	Receiving	Ivory Wilright	2 receptions, 27 yards

=== Southwestern Oklahoma State ===
Southwestern Oklahoma State Bulldogs at No. 2 Harding Bisons – Game summary

Quarter	1	2	3	4	Total
Bulldogs	0	0	0	0	0
No. 2 Bisons	14	14	10	17	55

at First Security Stadium, Searcy, Arkansas

- Date: September 11
- Game time: 7:00 p.m. CDT
- Game weather: Sunny, 84 °F (29 °C)
- Game attendance: 2,750
- Referee: Brad Frisby
- Box score, Recap

Game information
First quarter
- HAR – Andrew Miller 22-yard run (Magnus Lepak kick), 9:49. Bisons 7–0. Drive: 3 plays, 80 yards, 1:20.
- HAR – Braden Jay 58-yard run (Magnus Lepak kick), 6:13. Bisons 14–0. Drive: 3 plays, 74 yards, 1:31.

Second quarter

- HAR – Josh Evans-Pickens 4-yard run (Magnus Lepak kick), 12:29. Bisons 21–0. Drive: 9 plays, 57 yards, 4:16.
- HAR – Josh Strickland Jr. 18-yard run (Magnus Lepak kick), 2:17. Bisons 28–0. Drive: 6 plays, 72 yards, 3:20.

Third quarter

- HAR – Magnus Lepak 36-yard field goal, 12:57. Bisons 31–0. Drive: 4 plays, -2 yards, 1:50.
- HAR – Brandon Hines Jr. 12-yard run (Magnus Lepak kick), 2:46. Bisons 38–0. Drive: 8 plays, 76 yards, 4:22.

Fourth quarter

- HAR – Josh Strickland Jr. 1-yard run (Magnus Lepak kick), 11:31. Bisons 45–0. Drive: 9 plays, 69 yards, 4:22.
- HAR – Magnus Lepak 34-yard field goal, 2:31. Bisons 48–0. Drive: 9 plays, 62 yards, 5:39.
- HAR – Luke Janack 30-yard interception return (Magnus Lepak kick), 1:19. Bisons 55–0.

Statistics	SWO	HAR
First downs	12	25
Total yards	215	476
Rushing yards	103	436
Passing yards	112	40
Turnovers	1	0
Time of possession	32:02	27:58

Team	Category	Player	Statistics
SW Oklahoma State	Passing	M. J. Rivers	18/27, 112 yards, INT
SW Oklahoma State	Rushing	M. J. Rivers	15 rushes, 59 yards
SW Oklahoma State	Receiving	Bodie Boydstun	3 receptions, 51 yards
Harding	Passing	Cole Keylan	2/4, 40 yards
Harding	Rushing	Braden Jay	3 rushes, 91 yards, TD
Harding	Receiving	Christian Franklin	1 reception, 29 yards

=== At Southern Arkansas ===
No. 2 Harding Bisons at Southern Arkansas Muleriders – Game summary

Quarter	1	2	3	4	Total
No. 2 Bisons	0	17	14	0	31
Muleriders	0	0	6	6	12

at Memorial Stadium, El Dorado, Arkansas

- Date: September 20
- Game time: 6:00 p.m. CDT
- Game weather: Sunny, 90 °F (32 °C)
- Game attendance: 6,867
- Referee: Joshua Bannerman
- Box score, Recap

Game information
First quarter
- No scoring plays

Second quarter

- HAR – Magnus Lepak 33-yard field goal, 9:55. Bisons 3–0. Drive: 13 plays, 64 yards, 6:49.
- HAR – Christian Franklin 16-yard run (Magnus Lepak kick), 7:39. Bisons 10–0. Drive: 4 plays, 27 yards, 2:02.
- HAR – Cole Keylan 2-yard run (Magnus Lepak kick), 0:10. Bisons 17–0. Drive: 11 plays, 98 yards, 2:39.

Third quarter

- HAR – Braden Jay 31-yard run (Magnus Lepak kick), 13:59. Bisons 24–0. Drive: 2 plays, 76 yards, 0:56.
- SAU – Adam Parker 1-yard run (pass failed), 4:22. Bisons 24–6. Drive: 20 plays, 71 yards, 9:37.
- HAR – Braden Jay 63-yard run (Magnus Lepak kick), 2:58. Bisons 31–6. Drive: 3 plays, 75 yards, 1:24.

Fourth quarter

- SAU – DeAndra Burns Jr. 30-yard pass from Hezekiah Harris (pass failed), 8:02. Bisons 31–12. Drive: 4 plays, 48 yards, 1:35.

Statistics	HAR	SAU
First downs	21	22
Total yards	433	333
Rushing yards	433	119
Passing yards	0	214
Turnovers	0	2
Time of possession	28:19	31:41

Team	Category	Player	Statistics
Harding	Passing	Cole Keylan	0/4, 0 yards
Harding	Rushing	Andrew Miller	15 rushes, 137 yards
Harding	Receiving	None	
Southern Arkansas	Passing	Adam Parker	11/22, 113 yards, INT
Southern Arkansas	Rushing	Hezekiah Harris	15 rushes, 64 yards
Southern Arkansas	Receiving	DeAndra Burns Jr.	4 receptions, 84 yards, TD

=== Ouachita Baptist ===
Ouachita Baptist Tigers at No. 2 Harding Bisons – Game summary

Quarter	1	2	3	4	Total
Tigers	0	0	7	0	7
No. 2 Bisons	7	0	14	3	24

at First Security Stadium, Searcy, Arkansas

- Date: September 27
- Game time: 7:00 p.m. CDT
- Game weather: Clear, 75 °F (24 °C)
- Game attendance: 5,125
- Referee: Lance Mathis
- Box score, Recap

Game information
First quarter
- HAR – Braden Jay 3-yard run (Magnus Lepak kick), 0:27. Bisons 7–0. Drive: 11 plays, 68 yards, 6:17.

Second quarter

- No scoring plays

Third quarter

- HAR – Andrew Miller 8-yard run (Magnus Lepak kick), 10:06. Bisons 14–0. Drive: 8 plays, 33 yards, 4:53.
- OBU – Garrison Jackson 1-yard pass from Jordan Walker (Dax Jaggers kick), 4:10. Bisons 14–7. Drive: 12 plays, 75 yards, 5:56.
- HAR – Braden Jay 28-yard run (Magnus Lepak kick), 1:11. Bisons 21–7. Drive: 5 plays, 81 yards, 2:53.

Fourth quarter

- HAR – Magnus Lepak 48-yard field goal, 8:36. Bisons 24–7. Drive: 7 plays, 40 yards, 4:24.

Statistics	OBU	HAR
First downs	13	19
Total yards	285	336
Rushing yards	99	326
Passing yards	186	10
Turnovers	0	1
Time of possession	24:31	35:29

Team	Category	Player	Statistics
Ouachita Baptist	Passing	Nate TenBarge	14/21, 181 yards
Ouachita Baptist	Rushing	Tre Nichols	6 rushes, 44 yards
Ouachita Baptist	Receiving	Justice Hill	2 receptions, 54 yards
Harding	Passing	Cole Keylan	1/2, 10 yards
Harding	Rushing	Andrew Miller	22 rushes, 119 yards, TD
Harding	Receiving	Andrew Miller	1 reception, 10 yards

=== East Central ===
East Central Tigers at No. 2 Harding Bisons – Game summary

Quarter	1	2	3	4	Total
Tigers	0	0	0	0	0
No. 2 Bisons	23	14	28	0	65

at First Security Stadium, Searcy, Arkansas

- Date: October 4
- Game time: 2:00 p.m. CDT
- Game weather: Sunny, 84 °F (29 °C)
- Game attendance: 2,025
- Referee: Andrew Chestnut
- Box score, Recap

Game information
First quarter
- HAR – Braden Jay 66-yard run (Magnus Lepak kick), 13:18. Bisons 7–0. Drive: 1 play, 66 yards, 0:10.
- HAR – Andrew Miller 13-yard run (Magnus Lepak kick), 9:17. Bisons 14–0. Drive: 7 plays, 53 yards, 3:58.
- HAR – Sergio Kennedy intentional grounding enforced in own end zone, 3:17. Bisons 16–0.
- HAR – Braden Jay 13-yard run (Magnus Lepak kick), 0:30. Bisons 23–0. Drive: 5 plays, 41 yards, 2:40.

Second quarter

- HAR – Andrew Miller 1-yard run (Magnus Lepak kick), 11:18. Bisons 30–0. Drive: 8 plays, 50 yards, 3:48.
- HAR – Christian Franklin 10-yard run (Magnus Lepak kick), 1:55. Bisons 37–0. Drive: 10 plays, 72 yards, 6:23.

Third quarter

- HAR – Christian Franklin 23-yard run (Magnus Lepak kick), 8:56. Bisons 44–0. Drive: 5 plays, 72 yards, 2:58.
- HAR – Da'Shawn Harris 2-yard run (Thomas Griffin kick), 6:15. Bisons 51–0. Drive: 3 plays, 15 yards, 1:08.
- HAR – Ajani Farmer 30-yard fumble return (Thomas Griffin kick), 6:05. Bisons 58–0.
- HAR – Sam Mitchum 10-yard run (Thomas Griffin kick), 0:50. Bisons 65–0. Drive: 7 plays, 40 yards, 3:58.

Fourth quarter

- No scoring plays

Statistics	ECU	HAR
First downs	6	27
Total yards	78	484
Rushing yards	3	475
Passing yards	75	9
Turnovers	2	0
Time of possession	21:24	38:36

Team	Category	Player	Statistics
East Central	Passing	Sergio Kennedy	8/21, 58 yards, INT
East Central	Rushing	Austin Bowen	5 rushes, 25 yards
East Central	Receiving	Jacob Martin	2 receptions, 15 yards
Harding	Passing	Cole Keylan	2/4, 9 yards
Harding	Rushing	Braden Jay	7 rushes, 138 yards, 2 TD
Harding	Receiving	Ben Boehm	1 reception, 8 yards

=== At Southeastern Oklahoma State ===
No. 2 Harding Bisons at Southeastern Oklahoma State Savage Storm – Game summary

Quarter	1	2	3	4	Total
No. 2 Bisons	14	7	14	0	35
Savage Storm	0	7	0	0	7

at Paul Laird Field, Durant, Oklahoma

- Date: October 9
- Game time: 6:00 p.m. CDT
- Game weather: Sunny, 87 °F (31 °C)
- Game attendance: 1,464
- Referee: Michael Gervais
- Box score, Recap

Game information
First quarter
- HAR – Cole Keylan 2-yard run (Magnus Lepak kick), 10:30. Bisons 7–0. Drive: 5 plays, 61 yards, 2:23.
- HAR – Andrew Miller 9-yard run (Magnus Lepak kick), 1:05. Bisons 14–0. Drive: 4 plays, 70 yards, 2:20.

Second quarter

- SOU – Kameron Lockhart 23-yard run (Dylan Cox kick), 11:35. Bisons 14–7. Drive: 8 plays, 75 yards, 4:24.
- HAR – Braden Jay 39-yard run (Magnus Lepak kick), 10:30. Bisons 21–7. Drive: 2 plays, 44 yards, 1:03.

Third quarter

- HAR – Christian Franklin 76-yard run (Magnus Lepak kick), 14:38. Bisons 28–7. Drive: 1 play, 76 yards, 0:14.
- HAR – Braden Jay 22-yard run (Magnus Lepak kick), 3:10. Bisons 35–7. Drive: 9 plays, 97 yards, 5:35.

Fourth quarter

- No scoring plays

Statistics	HAR	SOU
First downs	19	15
Total yards	444	277
Rushing yards	401	182
Passing yards	43	95
Turnovers	2	3
Time of possession	25:39	34:21

Team	Category	Player	Statistics
Harding	Passing	Cole Keylan	2/2, 41 yards
Harding	Rushing	Braden Jay	8 rushes, 180 yards, 2 TD
Harding	Receiving	Brady Barnett	1 reception, 29 yards
SE Oklahoma State	Passing	Levay Duncan	4/14, 89 yards, 2 INT
SE Oklahoma State	Rushing	Levay Duncan	12 rushes, 60 yards
SE Oklahoma State	Receiving	Kobe Jennings	2 receptions, 76 yards

=== At Henderson State ===
No. 2 Harding Bisons at Henderson State Reddies – Game summary

Quarter	1	2	3	4	Total
No. 2 Bisons	0	7	21	7	35
Reddies	3	0	0	7	10

at Carpenter–Haygood Stadium, Arkadelphia, Arkansas

- Date: October 18
- Game time: 5:10 p.m. CDT
- Game weather: Cloudy, 81 °F (27 °C)
- Game attendance: 3,722
- Referee: Dale Hargrave
- Box score, Recap

Game information
First quarter
- HSU – Ryan McDonnell 36-yard field goal, 7:39. Reddies 3–0. Drive: 15 plays, 56 yards, 7:21.

Second quarter

- HAR – Andrew Miller 3-yard run (Magnus Lepak kick), 3:09. Bisons 7–3. Drive: 2 plays, 6 yards, 0:40.

Third quarter

- HAR – Andrew Miller 75-yard run (Magnus Lepak kick), 14:50. Bisons 14–3. Drive: 1 play, 75 yards, 0:10.
- HAR – Andrew Miller 90-yard run (Magnus Lepak kick), 6:48. Bisons 21–3. Drive: 1 play, 80 yards, 0:23.
- HAR – Braden Jay 2-yard run (Magnus Lepak kick), 1:14. Bisons 28–3. Drive: 7 plays, 57 yards, 4:11.

Fourth quarter

- HSU – Cayden Davis 46-yard pass from Andrew Edwards (Ryan McDonnell kick), 6:46. Bisons 28–10. Drive: 4 plays, 68 yards, 1:39.
- HAR – Andrew Miller 7-yard run (Magnus Lepak kick), 1:55. Bisons 35–10. Drive: 9 plays, 49 yards, 4:49.

Statistics	HAR	HSU
First downs	10	20
Total yards	365	300
Rushing yards	338	90
Passing yards	27	210
Turnovers	1	5
Time of possession	27:56	32:04

Team	Category	Player	Statistics
Harding	Passing	Cole Keylan	2/2, 27 yards
Harding	Rushing	Andrew Miller	21 rushes, 298 yards, 4 TD
Harding	Receiving	Braden Jay	1 reception, 24 yards
Henderson State	Passing	Andrew Edwards	24/34, 210 yards, TD, INT
Henderson State	Rushing	Frederick O'Donald	8 rushes, 40 yards
Henderson State	Receiving	Cayden Davis	7 receptions, 94 yards, TD

=== Arkansas–Monticello ===
Arkansas–Monticello Boll Weevils at No. 2 Harding Bisons – Game summary

Quarter	1	2	3	4	Total
Boll Weevils	0	0	0	0	0
No. 2 Bisons	14	20	14	7	55

at First Security Stadium, Searcy, Arkansas

- Date: October 25
- Game time: 2:00 p.m. CDT
- Game weather: Cloudy, 69 °F (21 °C)
- Game attendance: 1,250
- Referee: Devin Simpson
- Box score, Recap

Game information
First quarter
- HAR – Braden Jay 40-yard run (Magnus Lepak kick), 13:22. Bisons 7–0. Drive: 2 plays, 43 yards, 0:43.
- HAR – Christian Franklin 14-yard run (Magnus Lepak kick), 1:18. Bisons 14–0. Drive: 13 plays, 63 yards, 6:51.

Second quarter

- HAR – Andrew Miller 26-yard run (Magnus Lepak kick), 12:13. Bisons 21–0. Drive: 3 plays, 68 yards, 1:27.
- HAR – Andrew Miller 63-yard run (Magnus Lepak kick), 10:27. Bisons 28–0. Drive: 1 plays, 63 yards, 0:10.
- HAR – Christian Franklin 1-yard run (kick failed), 1:22. Bisons 34–0. Drive: 9 plays, 89 yards, 3:26.

Third quarter

- HAR – Brandon Hines Jr. 59-yard run (Magnus Lepak kick), 14:48. Bisons 41–0. Drive: 1 play, 59 yards, 0:10.
- HAR – Josh Strickland Jr. 68-yard run (Thomas Griffin kick), 4:50. Bisons 48–0. Drive: 3 plays, 84 yards, 1:35.

Fourth quarter

- HAR – Malik Young 7-yard run (Thomas Griffin kick), 12:14. Bisons 55–0. Drive: 12 plays, 69 yards, 7:08.

Statistics	UAM	HAR
First downs	16	24
Total yards	165	600
Rushing yards	17	590
Passing yards	148	10
Turnovers	1	0
Time of possession	29:25	30:35

Team	Category	Player	Statistics
Arkansas–Monticello	Passing	Tavion Faulk	14/28, 148 yards, INT
Arkansas–Monticello	Rushing	Isaiah Broadway	5 rushes, 18 yards
Arkansas–Monticello	Receiving	T. J. Fields	4 receptions, 49 yards
Harding	Passing	Cole Keylan	1/4, 10 yards
Harding	Rushing	Josh Strickland Jr.	7 rushes, 152 yards, TD
Harding	Receiving	Andrew Miller	1 reception, 10 yards

=== Oklahoma Baptist ===
Oklahoma Baptist Bison at No. 2 Harding Bisons – Game summary

Quarter	1	2	3	4	Total
OKB Bison	0	0	0	0	0
No. 2 HAR Bisons	14	28	14	13	69

at First Security Stadium, Searcy, Arkansas

- Date: November 1
- Game time: 3:00 p.m. CDT
- Game weather: Cloudy, 55 °F (13 °C)
- Game attendance: 3,050
- Referee: Joshua Bannerman
- Box score, Recap

Game information
First quarter
- HAR – Andrew Miller 12-yard run (Magnus Lepak kick), 10:53. Bisons 7–0. Drive: 6 plays, 64 yards, 3:06.
- HAR – Cole Keylan 8-yard run (Magnus Lepak kick), 4:33. Bisons 14–0. Drive: 6 plays, 65 yards, 2:34.

Second quarter

- HAR – Cole Keylan 2-yard run (Magnus Lepak kick), 12:53. Bisons 21–0. Drive: 10 plays, 69 yards, 5:46.
- HAR – Braden Jay 79-yard pass from Cole Keylan (Magnus Lepak kick), 9:57. Bisons 28–0. Drive: 1 play, 79 yards, 0:11.
- HAR – Andrew Miller 11-yard run (Magnus Lepak kick), 6:17. Bisons 35–0. Drive: 4 plays, 30 yards, 2:05.
- HAR – Clark Griffin 15-yard interception return (Magnus Lepak kick), 6:01. Bisons 42–0.

Third quarter

- HAR – Andrew Miller 2-yard run (Magnus Lepak kick), 10:48. Bisons 49–0. Drive: 8 plays, 56 yards, 4:05.
- HAR – Brandon Hines Jr. 15-yard run (Thomas Griffin kick), 2:23. Bisons 56–0. Drive: 9 plays, 70 yards, 5:02.

Fourth quarter

- HAR – Josh Strickland Jr. 2-yard run (kick failed), 11:05. Bisons 62–0. Drive: 9 plays, 69 yards, 4:49.
- HAR – Dax Goff 28-yard run (Thomas Griffin kick), 4:18. Bisons 69–0. Drive: 3 plays, 38 yards, 1:18.

Statistics	OKB	HAR
First downs	13	36
Total yards	224	654
Rushing yards	93	506
Passing yards	131	148
Turnovers	4	1
Time of possession	23:38	36:22

Team	Category	Player	Statistics
Oklahoma Baptist	Passing	Brady Bricker	9/34, 73 yards, 2 INT
Oklahoma Baptist	Rushing	Caden Peevey	3 rushes, 45 yards
Oklahoma Baptist	Receiving	Garrett Vaughn	4 receptions, 32 yards
Harding	Passing	Cole Keylan	4/5, 148 yards, TD
Harding	Rushing	Andrew Miller	17 rushes, 143 yards, 3 TD
Harding	Receiving	Braden Jay	2 receptions, 87 yards, TD

=== At Southern Nazarene ===
No. 2 Harding Bisons at Southern Nazarene Crimson Storm – Game summary

Quarter	1	2	3	4	Total
No. 2 Bisons	7	28	10	7	52
Crimson Storm	0	0	14	0	14

at SNU Stadium, Bethany, Oklahoma

- Date: November 8
- Game time: 2:00 p.m. CST
- Game weather: Sunny
- Game attendance: 2,754
- Referee: Andrew Chestnut
- Box score, Recap

Game information
First quarter
- HAR – Braden Jay 9-yard run (Magnus Lepak kick), 1:43. Bisons 7–0. Drive: 6 plays, 63 yards, 3:12.

Second quarter

- HAR – Cole Keylan 56-yard run (Magnus Lepak kick), 14:11. Bisons 14–0. Drive: 3 plays, 64 yards, 0:59.
- HAR – Braden Jay 36-yard run (Magnus Lepak kick), 6:18. Bisons 21–0. Drive: 9 plays, 80 yards, 5:00.
- HAR – Andrew Miller 67-yard run (Magnus Lepak kick), 2:53. Bisons 28–0. Drive: 3 plays, 72 yards, 1:24.
- HAR – Braden Jay 26-yard run (Magnus Lepak kick), 0:16. Bisons 35–0. Drive: 8 plays, 69 yards, 1:34.

Third quarter

- SNU – Kaden Manuel 25-yard run (Kameron Van Prooyen kick), 11:45. Bisons 35–7. Drive: 2 plays, 37 yards, 0:33.
- HAR – Christian Franklin 71-yard run (Magnus Lepak kick), 10:56. Bisons 42–7. Drive: 2 plays, 75 yards, 0:49.
- SNU – Davon Sparks 24-yard pass from Jaxon Worley (Kameron Van Prooyen kick), 8:11. Bisons 42–14. Drive: 8 plays, 72 yards, 2:38.
- HAR – Magnus Lepak 30-yard field goal, 2:14. Bisons 45–14. Drive: 10 plays, 62 yards, 5:57.

Fourth quarter

- HAR – Josh Strickland Jr. 5-yard run (Magnus Lepak kick), 5:03. Bisons 52–14. Drive: 8 plays, 84 yards, 4:15.

Statistics	HAR	SNU
First downs	20	18
Total yards	586	285
Rushing yards	504	236
Passing yards	82	49
Turnovers	1	1
Time of possession	29:19	30:41

Team	Category	Player	Statistics
Harding	Passing	Cole Keylan	6/8, 82 yards, INT
Harding	Rushing	Andrew Miller	11 rushes, 109 yards, TD
Harding	Receiving	Bodie Neal	4 receptions, 72 yards
Southern Nazarene	Passing	Jaxon Worley	2/8, 30 yards, TD
Southern Nazarene	Rushing	Kaden Manuel	20 rushes, 89 yards, TD
Southern Nazarene	Receiving	Davon Sparks	2 receptions, 26 yards, TD

=== At Arkansas Tech ===
No. 2 Harding Bisons at Arkansas Tech Wonder Boys – Game summary

Quarter	1	2	3	4	Total
No. 2 Bisons	7	10	16	14	47
Wonder Boys	0	7	6	0	13

at Thone Stadium, Russellville, Arkansas

- Date: November 15
- Game time: 2:00 p.m. CST
- Game weather: Sunny, 80 °F (27 °C)
- Game attendance: 4,713
- Referee: Devin Simpson
- Box score, Recap

Game information
First quarter
- HAR – Christian Franklin 16-yard run (Magnus Lepak kick), 7:21. Bisons 7–0. Drive: 10 plays, 89 yards, 6:05.

Second quarter

- ATU – Jared Long 3-yard pass from Carter Hensley (Logan Tymeson kick), 13:37. Tied 7–7. Drive: 16 plays, 75 yards, 8:44.
- HAR – Magnus Lepak 28-yard field goal, 6:33. Bisons 10–7. Drive: 12 plays, 64 yards, 7:04.
- HAR – Braden Jay 54-yard run (Magnus Lepak kick), 2:32. Bisons 17–7. Drive: 5 plays, 80 yards, 2:29.

Third quarter

- HAR – Andrew Miller 4-yard run (Magnus Lepak kick), 13:35. Bisons 24–7. Drive: 3 plays, 65 yards, 1:25.
- HAR – Andrew Miller 71-yard run (Magnus Lepak kick), 11:53. Bisons 31–7. Drive: 1 play, 71 yards, 0:10.
- ATU – Carldell Sirmons 13-yard run (kick blocked), 9:45. Bisons 31–13. Drive: 5 plays, 75 yards, 2:08.
- HAR – Curtis Jackson defensive PAT return, 9:45. Bisons 33–13.

Fourth quarter

- HAR – Andrew Miller 1-yard run (Magnus Lepak kick), 9:37. Bisons 40–13. Drive: 13 plays, 93 yards, 7:46.
- HAR – Brandon Hines Jr. 12-yard run (Magnus Lepak kick), 7:42. Bisons 47–13. Drive: 1 play, 12 yards, 0:06.

Statistics	HAR	ATU
First downs	26	15
Total yards	569	320
Rushing yards	569	97
Passing yards	0	223
Turnovers	0	2
Time of possession	33:40	26:20

Team	Category	Player	Statistics
Harding	Passing	Braden Jay	0/1, 0 yards
Harding	Rushing	Andrew Miller	24 rushes, 203 yards, 3 TD
Harding	Receiving	None	
Arkansas Tech	Passing	Carter Hensley	19/33, 223 yards, TD, 2 INT
Arkansas Tech	Rushing	Bryson Roland	14 rushes, 80 yards
Arkansas Tech	Receiving	Jared Long	6 receptions, 96 yards, TD

=== No. 14 Northwest Missouri State (NCAA Division II First Round) ===
2025 NCAA Division II First Round
No. 14 Northwest Missouri State Bearcats at No. 2 Harding Bisons – Game summary

Quarter	1	2	3	4	Total
No. 14 Bearcats	0	10	0	6	16
No. 2 Bisons	10	14	7	7	38

at First Security Stadium, Searcy, Arkansas

- Date: November 22
- Game time: 1:00 p.m. CST
- Game weather: Cloudy, 63 °F (17 °C)
- Game attendance: 3,225
- Referee: Richard Gray
- Box score, Recap

Game information
First quarter
- HAR – Braden Jay 7-yard run (Magnus Lepak kick), 9:16. Bisons 7–0. Drive: 9 plays, 65 yards, 4:58.
- HAR – Magnus Lepak 25-yard field goal, 3:49. Bisons 10–0. Drive: 7 plays, 46 yards, 4:10.

Second quarter

- HAR – Braden Jay 10-yard run (Magnus Lepak kick), 10:08. Bisons 17–0. Drive: 12 plays, 67 yards, 7:31.
- NWM – Quincy Torry 75-yard run (Mo Alwaely kick), 9:56. Bisons 17–7. Drive: 1 play, 75 yards, 0:12.
- HAR – Christian Franklin 10-yard run (Magnus Lepak kick), 1:55. Bisons 24–7. Drive: 13 plays, 90 yards, 7:53.
- NWM – Mo Alwaely 19-yard field goal, 0:00. Bisons 24–10. Drive: 12 plays, 73 yards, 1:55.

Third quarter

- HAR – Christian Franklin 7-yard run (Magnus Lepak kick), 8:45. Bisons 31–10. Drive: 10 plays, 75 yards, 6:15.

Fourth quarter

- HAR – Andrew Miller 23-yard run (Magnus Lepak kick), 4:21. Bisons 38–10. Drive: 8 plays, 64 yards, 5:03.
- NWO – Te'Shaun Porter 66-yard run (pass failed), 2:35. Bisons 38–16. Drive: 4 plays, 75 yards, 1:46.

Statistics	NWM	HAR
First downs	15	31
Total yards	332	475
Rushing yards	253	427
Passing yards	79	48
Turnovers	1	1
Time of possession	16:43	43:17

Team	Category	Player	Statistics
NW Missouri State	Passing	Chris Ruhnke	7/15, 75 yards, INT
NW Missouri State	Rushing	Quincy Torry	8 rushes, 116 yards, TD
NW Missouri State	Receiving	Trevor Spady	1 reception, 20 yards
Harding	Passing	Cole Keylan	2/2, 48 yards
Harding	Rushing	Andrew Miller	33 rushes, 195 yards, TD
Harding	Receiving	Brady Barnett	2 receptions, 48 yards

=== No. 6 Pittsburg State (NCAA Division II Second Round) ===
2025 NCAA Division II Second Round
No. 6 Pittsburg State Gorillas at No. 2 Harding Bisons – Game summary

Quarter	1	2	3	4	Total
No. 6 Gorillas	0	0	7	14	21
No. 2 Bisons	6	14	14	3	37

at First Security Stadium, Searcy, Arkansas

- Date: November 29
- Game time: 1:00 p.m. CST
- Game weather: Cloudy, 46 °F (8 °C)
- Game attendance: 2,125
- Referee: Jerry Welmaker
- Box score, Recap

Game information
First quarter
- HAR – Andrew Miller 1-yard run (pass failed), 3:08. Bisons 6–0. Drive: 17 plays, 99 yards, 9:31.

Second quarter

- HAR – Braden Jay 59-yard run (Magnus Lepak kick), 7:23. Bisons 13–0. Drive: 2 plays, 63 yards, 0:53.
- HAR – Cole Keylan 2-yard run (Magnus Lepak kick), 1:13. Bisons 20–0. Drive: 10 plays, 60 yards, 4:24.

Third quarter

- HAR – Andrew Miller 32-yard run (Magnus Lepak kick), 11:23. Bisons 27–0. Drive: 6 plays, 75 yards, 3:37.
- PSU – Zahmari Palode-Gary (Austin Schmitt kick), 9:18. Bisons 27–7. Drive: 4 plays, 58 yards, 1:58.
- HAR – Andrew Miller 44-yard run (Magnus Lepak kick), 4:49. Bisons 34–7. Drive: 7 plays, 75 yards, 4:29.

Fourth quarter

- HAR – Magnus Lepak 22-yard field goal, 12:45. Bisons 37–7. Drive: 10 plays, 42 yards, 5:22.
- PSU – Kuron Parchmon 5-yard pass from Jackson Berry (Austin Schmitt kick), 8:42. Bisons 37–14. Drive: 7 plays, 44 yards, 3:28.
- PSU – Luke Niggemann 30-yard pass from Jackson Berry (Austin Schmitt kick), 7:41. Bisons 37–21. Drive: 1 play, 30 yards, 0:08.

Statistics	PSU	HAR
First downs	11	24
Total yards	236	456
Rushing yards	119	430
Passing yards	117	26
Turnovers	0	2
Time of possession	21:08	38:52

Team	Category	Player	Statistics
Pittsburg State	Passing	Jackson Berry	10/21, 117 yards, 2 TD
Pittsburg State	Rushing	Zahmari Palode-Gary	6 rushes, 62 yards, TD
Pittsburg State	Receiving	Jaelon Travis	2 receptions, 44 yards
Harding	Passing	Cole Keylon	1/3, 26 yards
Harding	Rushing	Andrew Miller	26 rushes, 172 yards, 3 TD
Harding	Receiving	Brady Barnett	1 reception, 26 yards

=== No. 10 UT Permian Basin (NCAA Division II Quarterfinal) ===
2025 NCAA Division II Playoffs Quarterfinal
No. 10 UT Permian Basin Falcons at No. 2 Harding Bisons – Game summary

Quarter	1	2	3	4	Total
No. 10 Falcons	7	14	7	0	28
No. 2 Bisons	14	17	3	0	34

at First Security Stadium, Searcy, Arkansas

- Date: December 6
- Game time: 1:00 p.m. CST
- Game weather: Cloudy, 45 °F (7 °C)
- Game attendance: 2,775
- Referee: Jaime Martinez
- Box score, Recap

Game information
First quarter
- HAR – Braden Jay 55-yard run (Magnus Lepak kick), 10:47. Bisons 7–0. Drive: 5 plays, 71 yards, 2:52.
- HAR – Braden Jay 6-yard run (Magnus Lepak kick), 5:18. Bisons 14–0. Drive: 10 plays, 54 yards, 5:29.
- UTPB – Kanon Gibson 1-yard run (Diego Chavarria kick), 0:08. Bisons 14–7. Drive: 13 plays, 75 yards, 5:10.

Second quarter

- HAR – Cole Keylon 50-yard run (Magnus Lepak kick), 13:23. Bisons 21–7. Drive: 4 plays, 65 yards, 1:40.
- UTPB – Camden Tyler 1-yard (Diego Chavarria kick), 10:08. Bisons 21–14. Drive: 7 plays, 34 yards, 3:10.
- UTPB – Jace Wyatt 45-yard pass from Kanon Gibson (Diego Chavarria kick), 6:56. Tied 21–21. Drive: 3 plays, 80 yards, 1:10.
- HAR – Brady Barnett 24-yard run (Magnus Lepak kick), 1:44. Bisons 28–21. Drive: 10 plays, 80 yards, 5:08.
- HAR – Magnus Lepak 47-yard field goal, 0:07. Bisons 31–21. Drive: 8 plays, 21 yards, 1:20.

Third quarter

- HAR – Magnus Lepak 23-yard field goal, 8:29. Bisons 34–21. Drive: 7 plays, 15 yards, 3:34.
- UTPB – Kanon Gibson 1-yard run (Diego Chavarria kick), 3:34. Bisons 34–28. Drive: 12 plays, 75 yards, 4:55.

Fourth quarter

- No scoring plays

Statistics	UTPB	HAR
First downs	24	20
Total yards	364	396
Rushing yards	52	389
Passing yards	312	7
Turnovers	2	0
Time of possession	24:13	35:47

Team	Category	Player	Statistics
UT Permian Basin	Passing	Kanon Gibson	30/41, 321 yards, TD, 2 INT
UT Permian Basin	Rushing	Kanon Gibson	13 rushes, 38 yards, 2 TD
UT Permian Basin	Receiving	Jace Wyatt	4 receptions, 85 yards, TD
Harding	Passing	Cole Keylon	1/3, 7 yards
Harding	Rushing	Cole Keylon	17 rushes, 148 yards, TD
Harding	Receiving	Brady Barnett	1 reception, 7 yards

=== At No. 3 Kutztown (NCAA Division II Semifinal) ===
2025 NCAA Division II Semifinal
No. 2 Harding Bisons at No. 3 Kutztown Golden Bears – Game summary

Quarter	1	2	3	4	Total
No. 2 Bisons	7	14	21	7	49
No. 3 Golden Bears	0	7	6	14	27

at Andre Reed Stadium, Kutztown, Pennsylvania

- Date: December 13
- Game time: 2:30 p.m. CST/3:30 p.m. EST
- Game weather: Sunny, 36 °F (2 °C)
- Game attendance: 5,856
- Referee: Alan Davis
- Box score, Recap

Game information
First quarter
- HAR – Andrew Miller 1-yard run (Magnus Lepak kick), 11:34. Bisons 7–0. Drive: 7 plays, 68 yards, 3:20.

Second quarter

- HAR – Andrew Miller 2-yard run (Magnus Lepak kick), 14:56. Bisons 14–0. Drive: 11 plays, 85 yards, 6:13.
- HAR – Cole Keylan 10-yard run (Magnus Lepak kick), 1:54. Bisons 21–0. Drive: 13 plays, 95 yards, 7:46.
- KTZ – Rich Paczewski 26-yard pass from Judd Novak (Will Smith kick), 0:22. Bisons 21–7. Drive: 10 plays, 75 yards, 1:32.

Third quarter

- HAR – Cole Keylan 2-yard run (Magnus Lepak kick), 8:21. Bisons 28–7. Drive: 4 plays, 8 yards, 2:12.
- KTZ – Judd Novak 74-yard run (kick failed), 8:08. Bisons 28–13. Drive: 1 play, 74 yards, 0:13.
- HAR – Braden Jay 70-yard run (Magnus Lepak kick), 7:49. Bisons 35–13. Drive: 1 play, 70 yards, 0:12.
- HAR – Andrew Miller 2-yard run (Magnus Lepak kick), 2:35. Bisons 42–13. Drive: 5 plays, 36 yards, 2:05.

Fourth quarter

- HAR – Andrew Miller 73-yard run (Magnus Lepak kick), 10:23. Bisons 49–13. Drive: 1 play, 73 yards, 0:10.
- KTZ – Trevor Amorim 39-yard pass from Judd Novak (Will Smith kick), 7:42. Bisons 49–20. Drive: 5 plays, 74 yards, 2:41.
- KTZ – Rich Paczewski 25-yard pass from Judd Novak (Will Smith kick), 1:03. Bisons 49–27. Drive: 11 plays, 83 yards, 4:23.

Statistics	HAR	KTZ
First downs	18	23
Total yards	409	453
Rushing yards	389	208
Passing yards	20	245
Turnovers	0	1
Time of possession	25:52	34:08

Team	Category	Player	Statistics
Harding	Passing	Cole Keylon	1/1, 20 yards
Harding	Rushing	Andrew Miller	23 rushes, 157 yards, 4 TD
Harding	Receiving	Brady Barnett	1 reception, 20 yards
Kutztown	Passing	Judd Novak	20/37, 245 yards, 3 TD, INT
Kutztown	Rushing	Judd Novak	13 rushes, 137 yards, TD
Kutztown	Receiving	Rich Paczewski	6 receptions, 113 yards, 2 TD

=== Vs. No. 1 Ferris State (NCAA Division II Championship Game) ===
2025 NCAA Division II Championship Game
No. 2 Harding Bisons vs. No. 1 Ferris State Bulldogs – Game summary

Quarter	1	2	3	4	Total
No. 2 Bisons	0	14	7	0	21
No. 1 Bulldogs	14	7	21	0	42

at McKinney ISD Stadium, McKinney, Texas

- Date: December 20
- Game time: 3:00 p.m. CST
- Game weather: Sunny
- Game attendance: 10,521
- Referee: Richard Gray
- TV announcers (ESPN 2): Shawn Kenney and Taylor McHargue
- Box score, Recap

Game information
First quarter
- FSU – Wyatt Bower 4-yard run (Eddie Jewett kick), 6:39. Bulldogs 7–0. Drive: 7 plays, 70 yards, 4:08.
- FSU – Wyatt Bower 4-yard run (Eddie Jewett kick), 4:32. Bulldogs 14–0. Drive: 5 plays, 33 yards, 1:53.

Second quarter

- HAR – Andrew Miller 9-yard run (Magnus Lepak kick), 14:21. Bulldogs 14–7. Drive: 9 plays, 89 yards, 0:39.
- FSU – Cam Underwood 23-yard pass from Wyatt Bower (Eddie Jewett kick), 2:08. Bulldogs 21–7. Drive: 12 plays, 95 yards, 5:28.
- HAR – Christian Franklin 15-yard pass from Cole Keylan (Magnus Lepak kick), 0:46. Bulldogs 21–14. Drive: 5 plays, 71 yards, 1:14.

Third quarter

- FSU – Chase Carter 64-yard run (Eddie Jewett kick), 14:21. Bulldogs 28–14. Drive: 2 plays, 75 yards, 0:39.
- HAR – G'Kyson Wyatt 90-yard kickoff return (Magnus Lepak kick), 14:09. Bulldogs 28–21.
- FSU – Wyatt Bower 3-yard run (Eddie Jewett kick), 13:13. Bulldogs 35–21. Drive: 3 plays, 75 yards, 0:56.
- FSU – Carson Gulker 14-yard pass from Wyatt Bower (Eddie Jewett kick), 6:14. Bulldogs 42–21. Drive: 5 plays, 60 yards, 2:37.

Fourth quarter

- No scoring plays

Statistics	HAR	FSU
First downs	18	26
Total yards	326	587
Rushing yards	246	363
Passing yards	80	224
Turnovers	2	1
Time of possession	27:01	28:28

Team	Category	Player	Statistics
Harding	Passing	Cole Keylon	3/5, 80 yards, TD
Harding	Rushing	Christian Franklin	9 rushes, 76 yards
Harding	Receiving	Brady Barnett	1 reception, 42 yards
Ferris State	Passing	Wyatt Bower	10/16, 177 yards, 2 TD
Ferris State	Rushing	Chase Carter	7 rushes, 111 yards, TD
Ferris State	Receiving	Carson Gulker	3 receptions, 52 yards, TD

== Personnel ==
2025 Harding Bisons football team roster
Players
Coaches
Offense

Pos.	#	Name	Class
RB	2	Josh Strickland Jr.	Jr
RB	7	Braden Jay	Sr
RB	8	Andrew Miller	Jr
RB	9	Christian Franklin	Sr
RB	10	Josh Evans-Pickens	So
QB	11	Kyler Finney	Fr
WR	13	Brady Barnett	So
RB	14	Brandon Hines Jr.	Jr
QB	15	Cole Keylon	Sr
QB	16	Malik Young	Jr
QB	17	Camren Cavalier	Fr
WR	18	Darius Brown	Sr
QB	19	Carter Zimmerman	Fr
RB	21	Bo Simpson	Fr
RB	23	Da'Shawn Chairs	Fr
RB	24	Ben Boehm	Fr
WR	25	Tristan Wiley	Jr
WR	26	Bob Patterson	Fr
WR	30	Mabry Verser	Fr
RB	32	Sam Mitchum	So
RB	34	Dax Goff	Fr
RB	36	Lawson Sullivan	Fr
RB	37	Antonio Ford	Fr
RB	43	Jax Glendenning	Fr
TE	46	Talan Owen	Fr
OL	50	Jose Lopez	Jr
OL	51	Mike Ericson	Sr
OL	52	Gavin Waters	Fr
OL	53	Lucas McCain	Fr
OL	54	Jake Mitchell	Sr
OL	56	David Gomez	Jr
OL	60	Jackson Harrison	So
OL	61	John Silvestri	Fr
OL	62	Josh Lawrence	So
OL	64	Jude Steffen	Sr
OL	65	Joshua Cobb	So
OL	70	Jordan McClaine	Jr
OL	75	Cobe Williams	So
OL	76	Matt Colvin	So
OL	78	Dylan Daring	Sr
WR	80	Drew Porter	Sr
WR	81	Jackson Richardson	So
WR	82	Bodie Neal	So
WR	83	Jack Citty	Fr
TE	87	Isaac Gray	So
TE	87	Levi Mercer	So
WR	88	Elijah Carlton	So
TE	89	Johnathan Vining	So
WR		Eli Brooks	Fr
WR		Jordan Brown	Fr
RB		Parker Bruno	Fr
OL		Andrew Dawson	Fr
OL		Braeden Gibson	Fr
OL		Kameron Kauffman	Fr
OL		Bradyn King	Fr
OL		Josh Luallen	Fr
OL		Hayden Miller	Fr
QB		Malikai Miller	Fr
WR		Levi Phillips	Fr
OL		Tate Spray	Fr
QB		Cody Stoever	Fr
RB		Harrison Williams	Fr
RB		DK Wilson	Fr

Defense

Pos.	#	Name	Class
LB	0	Jordan Mays	So
DB	1	Grayson Lewis	So
DB	3	G'Kyson Wright	So
DB	4	Deion Campbell	Jr
LB	5	Kyle Henry	So
DB	6	Luke Martin	Jr
LB	11	Luke Janack	Sr
DB	12	Troy Wiseman	Sr
DB	15	Corey Dean	Fr
DB	16	Lamont Cox	So
DB	17	Zach Valcarcel	Jr
DB	18	Cole Redding	Fr
DB	19	Josh Gatlin	Fr
DB	20	Ty Dugger	Sr
DB	22	Curtis Jackson	Sr
DL	23	Tony Agyapong	Sr
LB	24	Clark Griffin	Sr
DB	26	Cedric Twyman	Fr
DB	27	Drew Nelson	So
DB	28	Zac O'Day	Jr
DB	29	Kelon Fountain	Fr
DB	31	Ahmad Jenkins	Fr
DB	33	Connor Dean	Fr
DL	35	Kaleb Walker	Fr
DB	36	Carter Hill	So
LB	37	Cooper Parker	Fr
DL	40	Kaden Spencer	Fr
LB	41	Caden Davis	Fr
LB	44	Kaden Henley	So
DL	45	Justin Sobczak	Jr
LB	46	Andrew McCall	So
DL	47	Will Dunn	Sr
LB	48	Dane Williams	Fr
DL	55	Kaynan Harris	Fr
DL	66	Noah Ostrander	Fr
DL	90	Chase Gratt	Jr
DL	91	Brock Knapton	So
DL	92	Bryce Rushing	So
DL	93	Josh Garner	Fr
DL	95	Nii Addy	So
DL	96	Joseph Oluwayemi	So
LB		Kason Brooks	Fr
DL		Nick Carden	Fr
DL		Dylan Chapman	Fr
DL		Vinny Discon	Fr
LB		Carter Henley	Fr
DB		Brett Jay	Fr
DB		Jo Mahop	Sr
DL		Solza McCullough	Fr
DB		Owen Miller	Fr
DB		Champ Robinson	Fr
DB		Josh Smith	Fr
DB		Brycen Spencer	Fr
DL		Parker Todd	Fr
DB		Percy Towns	Fr
DB		Jacoby Wade	Fr
DL		Will Watts	Fr

Special teams

Pos.	#	Name	Class
P	38	Luke Mammana	Sr
K	39	Magnus Lepak	Jr
LS	49	Xavier Hylton	Sr
LS	57	Aidan Hall	Fr
K, P	84	Griffin Thomas	Fr
LS	86	Jack Edwards	Fr

Head coach

- Paul Simmons

Coordinators/assistant coaches

- Tre'von Biglow
  Defensive line
- Sam Blakenship
  Safeties
- Kevin Chism
  Offensive line
- Ryan Derrick
  Wide receivers
- Will Francis
  Quarterbacks/Fullbacks
- Roddy Mote
  Defensive coordinator/Linebackers
- Luke Tribble
  Co-defensive coordinator/Special teams coordinator/Defensive backs
- Matt Underwood
  Director of recruiting/Slotbacks
- Kenny Wheaton
  Offensive consultant
- Jay Durrell
  Defensive graduate assistant
- William Griffin
  Offensive graduate assistant
- Jhalen Spicer
  Offensive graduate assistant
- Jake Graff
  Defensive graduate assistant

Legend

- (C) Team captain
- (S) Suspended
- (I) Ineligible
- Injured
- Redshirt

Roster
Last update: December 7, 2025
