= 2025 Ferris State Bulldogs football team =

American college football season

2025 Ferris State Bulldogs football

GLIAC champion NCAA Division II national champion

NCAA Division II National Championship Game, W 42–21 vs. Harding
- Conference: Great Lakes Intercollegiate Athletic Conference

Ranking
- AFCA: No. 1
- Record: 16–0 (7–0 GLIAC)
- Head coach: Tony Annese (14th season)
- Offensive coordinator: Steve Annese (14th season)
- Offensive scheme: Spread option
- Defensive coordinator: Tony Annese II (2nd season)
- Co-defensive coordinator: Grant Caserta (1st season)
- Base defense: 4–3
- Home stadium: Top Taggart Field

2025 Great Lakes Intercollegiate Athletic Conference football standings
	Conf.			Overall
Team	W		L	W		L
No. 1 Ferris State $^	7	–	0	16	–	0
Grand Valley State	5	–	2	7	–	3
Saginaw Valley State	5	–	2	6	–	5
Michigan Tech	4	–	3	7	–	4
Davenport	4	–	3	5	–	5
Northern Michigan	2	–	5	3	–	8
Roosevelt*	1	–	6	2	–	8
Wayne State (MI)	0	–	7	0	–	11
$ – Conference champion; ^ – NCAA Division II playoff participant; * – Roosevelt ineligible for postseason play due to transition from NAIA; Rankings from AFCA poll

The 2025 Ferris State Bulldogs football team was an American football team that represented Ferris State University as a member of the Great Lakes Intercollegiate Athletic Conference (GLIAC) during the 2025 NCAA Division II football season. They were led by 14th-year head coach Tony Annese and played home games at Top Taggart Field in Big Rapids, Michigan.

The Bulldogs went undefeated with a 16–0 record, winning their second straight and fourth overall championship by defeating Harding 42–21 in the NCAA Division II national championship game. The Bulldogs were ranked no. 1 each week in both the AFCA Poll and the D2Football.com Poll throughout the season and became the first NCAA Division II team to finish 16–0 in modern college football.

The team set an NCAA and program record by scoring 844 points in a single season (an average of 52.75 points per game), besting the previous mark by Pittsburg State in 2004. With the championship, Ferris State becomes just the second Division II school to win four titles in five years, equaling rival Grand Valley State. The championship also places the Bulldogs in a tie for second place for most Division II titles (with Grand Valley State and Valdosta State). The national championship game marked the team's 30th consecutive win and the most wins in a season in school history.

== Schedule ==
Date	Time	Opponent	Rank	Site	Result	Attendance
August 28	6:00 p.m.	No. 9 Pittsburg State*	No. 1	Top Taggart Field; Big Rapids, MI	W 34–17	5,434
September 6	2:00 p.m.	at Lake Erie*	No. 1	Jack Britt Memorial Stadium; Painesville, OH	W 63–6	494
September 13	6:00 p.m.	Tiffin*	No. 1	Top Taggart Field; Big Rapids, MI	W 41–34	3,356
September 20	3:00 p.m.	Rio Grande*^{†}	No. 1	Top Taggart Field; Big Rapids, MI	W 76–0	5,477
October 4	1:00 p.m.	at Roosevelt	No. 1	Morris Field; Arlington Heights, IL	W 66–0	592
October 11	1:00 p.m.	Wayne State (MI)	No. 1	Top Taggart Field; Big Rapids, MI	W 59–0	3,124
October 18	12:00 p.m.	at Michigan Tech	No. 1	Sherman Field; Houghton, MI	W 38–10	1,635
October 25	1:00 p.m.	No. 18 Grand Valley State	No. 1	Top Taggart Field; Big Rapids, MI (Anchor–Bone Classic)	W 38–31	10,089
November 1	1:00 p.m.	Northern Michigan	No. 1	Top Taggart Field; Big Rapids, MI	W 70–35	2,843
November 8	1:00 p.m.	at Saginaw Valley State	No. 1	Harvey Randall Wickes Memorial Stadium; University Center, MI	W 51–45 ^{2OT}	4,263
November 15	1:00 p.m.	at Davenport	No. 1	Farmers Insurance Athletic Complex; Caledonia Township, MI (Calder City Classic)	W 44–23	1,266
November 22	1:00 p.m.	Northwood*	No. 1	Top Taggart Field; Big Rapids, MI (NCAA Division II First Round)	W 65–14	3,124
November 29	1:00 p.m.	No. 18 Ashland*	No. 1	Top Taggart Field; Big Rapids, MI (NCAA Division II Second Round)	W 56–24	1,326
December 6	1:00 p.m.	No. 21 Minnesota State*	No. 1	Top Taggart Field; Big Rapids, MI (NCAA Division II Quarterfinal)	W 52–29	1,582
December 13	12:00 p.m.	No. 16 Newberry*	No. 1	Top Taggart Field; Big Rapids, MI (NCAA Division II Semifinal)	W 49–17	1,089
December 20	4:00 p.m.	vs. No. 2 Harding*	No. 1	McKinney ISD Stadium; McKinney, TX (NCAA Division II National Championship Game)	W 42–21	10,521
*Non-conference game; ^{†}Homecoming; Rankings from AFCA Poll released prior to the game; All times are in Eastern time

== Rankings ==
Ranking movements Legend: ( ) = First-place votes
	Week													
Poll	Pre	1	2	3	4	5	6	7	8	9	10	11	12	Final
AFCA	1 (30)	1 (31)	1 (31)	1 (31)	1 (31)	1 (31)	1 (31)	1 (31)	1 (30)	1 (31)	1 (31)	1 (29)	1 (30)	1 (30)
D2 Football	1	1	1	1	1	1	1	1	1	1	1	1	1	1

== GLIAC preseason poll ==
In the Great Lakes Intercollegiate Athletic Conference preseason media poll released on August 13, 2025, Ferris State was projected to finish first in the conference.

== Game summaries ==
=== No. 9 Pittsburg State ===
No. 9 Pittsburg State at No. 1 Ferris State Bulldogs – Game summary

Quarter	1	2	3	4	Total
No. 9 Gorillas	3	7	7	0	17
No. 1 Bulldogs	14	6	7	7	34

at Top Taggart Field, Big Rapids, Michigan

- Date: August 28
- Game time: 6:00 p.m. EDT
- Game weather: Sunny, 70 °F (21 °C)
- Game attendance: 5,434
- Referee: Jayson Dibble
- Box score, Recap

Game information
First quarter
- PSU – Austin Schmitt 47-yard field goal, 11:52. Gorillas 3–0. Drive: 6 plays, 40 yards, 3:02.
- FSU – Wyatt Bower 8-yard run (Eddie Jewett kick), 7:44. Bulldogs 7–3. Drive: 8 plays, 56 yards, 4:03.
- FSU – Zak Ahren 3-yard run (Eddie Jewett kick), 0:00. Bulldogs 14–3. Drive: 12 plays, 48 yards, 6:55.

Second quarter

- FSU – Wyatt Bower 11-yard run (kick blocked), 6:31. Bulldogs 20–3. Drive: 13 plays, 94 yards, 6:49.
- PSU – Kuron Parchmon 60-yard pass from Jackson Berry (Austin Schmitt kick), 0:58. Bulldogs 20–10. Drive: 3 plays, 80 yards, 1:02.

Third quarter

- FSU – Brady Rose 4-yard run (Eddie Jewett kick), 7:45. Bulldogs 27–10. Drive: 6 plays, 26 yards, 2:51.
- PSU – Cleo Chandler Jr. 3-yard run (Austin Schmitt kick), 5:14. Bulldogs 27–17. Drive: 7 plays, 63 yards, 2:26.

Fourth quarter

- FSU – Taariik Brett 24-yard pass from Wyatt Bower (Eddie Jewett kick), 8:40. Bulldogs 34–17. Drive: 2 plays, 30 yards, 0:30.

Statistics	PSU	FSU
First downs	18	22
Total yards	361	331
Rushing yards	67	200
Passing yards	294	131
Turnovers	1	1
Time of possession	23:30	36:30

Team	Category	Player	Statistics
Pittsburg State	Passing	Jackson Berry	18/41, 294 yards, TD, INT
Pittsburg State	Rushing	Cleo Chandler Jr.	16 rushes, 49 yards, TD
Pittsburg State	Receiving	Greyson Holbert	4 receptions, 81 yards
Ferris State	Passing	Wyatt Bower	11/18, 112 yards, TD
Ferris State	Rushing	Wyatt Bower	25 rushes, 99 yards, 2 TD
Ferris State	Receiving	Brady Rose	4 receptions, 53 yards

=== At Lake Erie ===
No. 1 Ferris State Bulldogs at Lake Erie Storm – Game summary

Quarter	1	2	3	4	Total
No. 1 Bulldogs	14	28	7	14	63
Storm	6	0	0	0	6

at Jack Britt Memorial Stadium, Painesville, Ohio

- Date: September 6
- Game time: 2:00 p.m. EDT
- Game weather: Sunny
- Game attendance: 494
- Referee: Michael Jarosinski
- Box score, Recap

Game information
First quarter
- LEC – Brian Mitchell 85-yard fumble return (kick failed), 10:02. Storm 6–0.
- FSU – Zak Ahern 12-yard run (Eddie Jewett kick), 8:07. Bulldogs 7–6. Drive: 6 plays, 73 yards, 1:49.
- FSU – Tae Boyd 20-yard pass from Wyatt Bower (Eddie Jewett kick), 0:00. Bulldogs 14–6. Drive: 3 plays, 37 yards, 0:20.

Second quarter

- FSU – Zak Ahern 1-yard run (Eddie Jewett kick), 13:01. Bulldogs 21–6. Drive: 2 plays, 14 yards, 0:25.
- FSU – Carson Gulker 63-yard pass from Wyatt Bower (Eddie Jewett kick), 12:07. Bulldogs 28–6. Drive: 1 play, 63 yards, 0:09.
- FSU – Tae Boyd 45-yard pass from Wyatt Bower (Eddie Jewett kick), 7:37. Bulldogs 35–6. Drive: 4 plays, 90 yards, 1:00.
- FSU – Dakari Neely 28-yard pass from Chase Carter (Eddie Jewett kick), 3:09. Bulldogs 42–6. Drive: 3 plays, 37 yards, 0:25.

Third quarter

- FSU – Chase Carter 2-yard run (Eddie Jewett kick), 0:18. Bulldogs 49–6. Drive: 10 plays, 71 yards, 4:30.

Fourth quarter

- FSU – Chase Carter 1-yard run (Eddie Jewett kick), 11:04. Bulldogs 56–6. Drive: 4 plays, 34 yards, 1:59.
- FSU – Chase Carter 2-yard run (Eddie Jewett kick), 1:57. Bulldogs 63–6. Drive: 18 plays, 89 yards, 7:23.

Statistics	FSU	LEC
First downs	28	11
Total yards	625	124
Rushing yards	327	58
Passing yards	298	66
Turnovers	2	3
Time of possession	29:22	30:38

Team	Category	Player	Statistics
Ferris State	Passing	Wyatt Bower	11/20, 220 yards, 3 TD
Ferris State	Rushing	Wyatt Bower	12 rushes, 107 yards
Ferris State	Receiving	Tae Boyd	2 receptions, 65 yards, 2 TD
Lake Erie	Passing	Brady Clark	10/27, 53 yards, 2 INT
Lake Erie	Rushing	Julian Means-Flewellen	14 rushes, 46 yards
Lake Erie	Receiving	Keshawn Johnson	5 receptions, 32 yards

=== Tiffin ===
Tiffin Dragons at No. 1 Ferris State Bulldogs – Game summary

Quarter	1	2	3	4	Total
Dragons	7	7	13	7	34
No. 1 Bulldogs	14	21	0	6	41

at Top Taggart Field, Big Rapids, Michigan

- Date: September 13
- Game time: 6:00 p.m. EDT
- Game weather: Sunny, 78 °F (26 °C)
- Game attendance: 3,356
- Referee: Rodney Smith
- Box score, Recap

Game information
First quarter
- TIF – Joey Trusdale 2-yard pass from Alex Johnson (Anthony Turnage kick), 10:38. Dragons 7–0. Drive: 10 plays, 75 yards, 4:22.
- FSU – Wyatt Bower 3-yard run (Eddie Jewett kick), 8:16. Tied 7–7. Drive: 4 plays, 61 yards, 2:10.
- FSU – Taariik Brett 29-yard pass from Wyatt Bower (Eddie Jewett kick), 3:38. Bulldogs 14–7. Drive: 4 plays, 80 yards, 1:10.

Second quarter

- FSU – Cam Underwood 25-yard pass from Wyatt Bower (Eddie Jewett kick), 12:23. Bulldogs 21–7. Drive: 10 plays, 90 yards, 4:04.
- FSU – Tarick Bower 20-yard pass from Wyatt Bower (Eddie Jewett kick), 4:57. Bulldogs 28–7. Drive: 9 plays, 83 yards, 4:26.
- TIF – Emari White 29-yard pass from Alex Johnson (Ben Rudolph kick), 2:09. Bulldogs 28–14. Drive: 6 plays, 60 yards, 2:43.
- FSU – Wyatt Bower 75-yard run (Eddie Jewett kick), 1:57. Bulldogs 35–14. Drive: 1 play, 75 yards, 0:12.

Third quarter

- TIF – Ronald Blackman 8-yard run (kick failed), 7:56. Bulldogs 35–20. Drive: 7 plays, 78 yards, 3:13.
- TIF – Malik Baker 77-yard blocked field goal return (Ben Rudolph kick), 0:36. Bulldogs 35–27.
- FSU – Wyatt Bower 1-yard run (kick failed), 1:58. Bulldogs 41–27. Drive: 8 plays, 73 yards, 3:46.
- TIF – Jaedyn McKinstry 65-yard pass from Alex Johnson (Ben Rudolph kick), 1:46. Bulldogs 41–34. Drive: 1 play, 65 yards, 0:12.

Statistics	TIF	FSU
First downs	23	21
Total yards	405	534
Rushing yards	65	273
Passing yards	340	261
Turnovers	1	0
Time of possession	29:46	30:14

Team	Category	Player	Statistics
Tiffin	Passing	Alex Johnson	24/37, 340 yards, 3 TD, INT
Tiffin	Rushing	Ronald Blackman	18 rushes, 60 yards, TD
Tiffin	Receiving	Jaedyn McKinstry	3 receptions, 85 yards, TD
Ferris State	Passing	Wyatt Bower	15/23, 232 yards, 2 TD
Ferris State	Rushing	Wyatt Bower	20 rushes, 146 yards, 3 TD
Ferris State	Receiving	Taariik Brett	5 receptions, 76 yards, TD

=== Rio Grande ===
Rio Grande RedStorm at No. 1 Ferris State Bulldogs – Game summary

Quarter	1	2	3	4	Total
RedStorm	0	0	0	0	0
No. 1 Bulldogs	28	14	28	6	76

at Top Taggart Field, Big Rapids, Michigan

- Date: September 20
- Game time: 3:00 p.m. EDT
- Game weather: Sunny, 75 °F (24 °C)
- Game attendance: 5,477
- Referee: Bryce Muller
- Box score, Recap

Game information
First quarter
- FSU – Taariik Brett 92-yard kickoff return (Eddie Jewett kick), 14:46. Bulldogs 7–0.
- FSU – Brady Rose 8-yard run (Eddie Jewett kick), 11:15. Bulldogs 14–0. Drive: 5 plays, 35 yards, 1:49.
- FSU – Zak Ahern 2-yard run (Eddie Jewett kick), 4:56. Bulldogs 21–0. Drive: 11 plays, 87 yards, 3:54.
- FSU – Justin Payoute 17-yard fumble return (Eddie Jewett kick), 3:56. Bulldogs 28–0.

Second quarter

- FSU – Chase Carter 28-yard run (Eddie Jewett kick), 14:09. Bulldogs 35–0. Drive: 6 plays, 82 yards, 2:39.
- FSU – Tarick Bower 5-yard pass from Chase Carter (Eddie Jewett kick), 4:01. Bulldogs 42–0. Drive: 14 plays, 68 yards, 5:19.

Third quarter

- FSU – Kevin Sims 27-yard run (Levi Tuinstra kick), 6:18. Bulldogs 49–0. Drive: 6 plays, 60 yards, 2:13.
- FSU – Maurice Adams 11-yard interception return (Levi Tuinstra kick), 4:45. Bulldogs 56–0.
- FSU – Jeremiah Housey 75-yard blocked field goal return (Levi Tuinstra kick), 3:04. Bulldogs 63–0.
- FSU – LeeShaun Mumpfield 3-yard run (Levi Tuinstra kick), 0:36. Bulldogs 70–0. Drive: 1 play, 3 yards, 0:04.

Fourth quarter

- FSU – LeeShaun Mumpfield 5-yard run (kick failed), 2:47. Bulldogs 76–0. Drive: 12 plays, 71 yards, 6:05.

Statistics	RG	FSU
First downs	9	23
Total yards	106	404
Rushing yards	8	239
Passing yards	98	165
Turnovers	2	0
Time of possession	37:35	22:25

Team	Category	Player	Statistics
Rio Grande	Passing	Keatin Emener	3/6, 18 yards, INT
Rio Grande	Rushing	Similoluwa Jaf-Ogunlayi	6 rushes, 37 yards
Rio Grande	Receiving	Mikelle Moore	5 receptions, 54 yards
Ferris State	Passing	Wyatt Bower	7/11, 124 yards
Ferris State	Rushing	Key'Vell Cooper	6 receptions, 54 yards
Ferris State	Receiving	Brady Rose	2 receptions, 44 yards

=== At Roosevelt ===
No. 1 Ferris State Bulldogs at Roosevelt Lakers – Game summary

Quarter	1	2	3	4	Total
No. 1 Bulldogs	21	21	10	14	66
Lakers	0	0	0	0	0

at Morris Field, Arlington Heights, Illinois

- Date: October 4
- Game time: 1:00 p.m. EDT / 12:00 p.m. CDT
- Game weather: Sunny, 84 °F (29 °C)
- Game attendance: 592
- Referee: Bryce Muller
- Box score, Recap

Statistics	FSU	RUL
First downs	31	16
Total yards	788	273
Rushing yards	417	70
Passing yards	371	203
Turnovers	1	4
Time of possession	26:30	33:30

Team	Category	Player	Statistics
Ferris State	Passing	Wyatt Bower	20/28, 371 yards, 5 TD
Ferris State	Rushing	Jake Price	8 rushes, 85 yards, TD
Ferris State	Receiving	Cam Underwood	3 receptions, 141 yards, 3 TD
Roosevelt	Passing	Zach Zella	19/35, 143 yards, 3 INT
Roosevelt	Rushing	Cam Davis	14 rushes, 43 yards
Roosevelt	Receiving	Norion Espadron	3 receptions, 55 yards

=== Wayne State (MI) ===
Wayne State Warriors at No. 1 Ferris State Bulldogs – Game summary

Quarter	1	2	3	4	Total
Warriors	0	0	0	0	0
No. 1 Bulldogs	14	28	14	3	59

at Top Taggart Field, Big Rapids, Michigan

- Date: October 11
- Game time: 1:00 p.m. EDT
- Game weather: Cloudy, 55 °F (13 °C)
- Game attendance: 3,124
- Referee: Royce McKinney
- Box score, Recap

Statistics	WSU	FSU
First downs	9	34
Total yards	110	639
Rushing yards	24	439
Passing yards	86	200
Turnovers	4	2
Time of possession	23:58	36:02

Team	Category	Player	Statistics
Wayne State	Passing	Champion Edwards	5/13, 52 yards, INT
Wayne State	Rushing	D'Vaun Bentley	4 rushes, 43 yards
Wayne State	Receiving	Justyz Tuggle	2 receptions, 30 yards
Ferris State	Passing	Chase Carter	7/10, 112 yards, TD
Ferris State	Rushing	Chase Carter	11 rushes, 114 yards, 2 TD
Ferris State	Receiving	Tarick Bower	1 reception, 44 yards

=== At Michigan Tech ===
No. 1 Ferris State Bulldogs at Michigan Tech Huskies – Game summary

Quarter	1	2	3	4	Total
No. 1 Bulldogs	7	14	17	0	38
Huskies	0	3	0	7	10

at Sherman Field, Houghton, Michigan

- Date: October 18
- Game time: 12:00 p.m. EDT
- Game weather: Sunny, 61 °F (16 °C)
- Game attendance: 1,635
- Referee: Rodney Smith
- Box score, Recap

Statistics	FSU	MTU
First downs	25	16
Total yards	428	219
Rushing yards	237	115
Passing yards	191	104
Turnovers	1	5
Time of possession	29:07	30:53

Team	Category	Player	Statistics
Ferris State	Passing	Wyatt Bower	15/26, 182 yards, 3 TD
Ferris State	Rushing	Wyatt Bower	14 rushes, 74 yards, TD
Ferris State	Receiving	Taariik Brett	5 receptions, 72 yards, TD
Michigan Tech	Passing	Alex Bueno	7/17, 65 yards, 4 INT
Michigan Tech	Rushing	Jake Rueff	17 rushes, 63 yards
Michigan Tech	Receiving	Ethan Champney	3 receptions, 45 yards

=== No. 18 Grand Valley State ===
No. 18 Grand Valley State Lakers at No. 1 Ferris State Bulldogs – Game summary

Quarter	1	2	3	4	Total
No. 18 Lakers	7	17	0	7	31
No. 1 Bulldogs	14	14	0	10	38

at Top Taggart Field, Big Rapids, Michigan

- Date: October 25
- Game time: 1:00 p.m. EDT
- Game weather: Cloudy, 46 °F (8 °C)
- Game attendance: 10,089
- Referee: Josh Luczak
- Box score, Recap

Statistics	GVSU	FSU
First downs	26	22
Total yards	462	433
Rushing yards	104	243
Passing yards	358	190
Turnovers	2	0
Time of possession	33:49	26:11

Team	Category	Player	Statistics
Grand Valley State	Passing	Andrew Schuster	23/39, 347 yards, 3 TD, INT
Grand Valley State	Rushing	Brady Drogosh	12 rushes, 62 yards
Grand Valley State	Receiving	Evan Furtney	4 receptions, 81 yards, TD
Ferris State	Passing	Wyatt Bower	10/20, 141 yards, 2 TD
Ferris State	Rushing	Taariik Brett	10 rushes, 89 yards, 2 TD
Ferris State	Receiving	Carson Gulker	6 receptions, 85 yards

=== Northern Michigan ===
Northern Michigan Wildcats at No. 1 Ferris State Bulldogs – Game summary

Quarter	1	2	3	4	Total
Wildcats	14	7	0	14	35
No. 1 Bulldogs	14	21	14	21	70

at Top Taggart Field, Big Rapids, Michigan

- Date: November 1
- Game time: 1:00 p.m. EDT
- Game weather: Cloudy, 46 °F (8 °C)
- Game attendance: 2,843
- Referee: Rodney Smith
- Box score, Recap

Statistics	NMU	FSU
First downs	21	30
Total yards	355	597
Rushing yards	224	265
Passing yards	131	332
Turnovers	1	2
Time of possession	36:03	23:57

Team	Category	Player	Statistics
Northern Michigan	Passing	Trevor Theuerkauf	8/16, 131 yards, 2 TD, INT
Northern Michigan	Rushing	Noah Dobert	29 rushes, 117 yards
Northern Michigan	Receiving	Sebastian Boyea	3 receptions, 56 yards, TD
Ferris State	Passing	Wyatt Bower	10/14, 177 yards, TD, INT
Ferris State	Rushing	Chase Carter	7 rushes, 62 yards, 3 TD
Ferris State	Receiving	Tae Boyd	3 receptions, 131 yards, TD

=== At Saginaw Valley State ===
No. 1 Ferris State Bulldogs at Saginaw Valley State Cardinals – Game summary

Quarter	1	2	3	4	OT	2OT	Total
No. 1 Bulldogs	0	7	21	10	7	6	51
Cardinals	3	14	7	14	7	0	45

at Harvey Randall Wickes Memorial Stadium, University Center, Michigan

- Date: November 8
- Game time: 1:00 p.m. EST
- Game weather: Sunny, 39 °F (4 °C)
- Game attendance: 4,263
- Referee: Josh Luczak
- Box score, Recap

Game information
First quarter
- SVSU – Teagan Lenderink 35-yard field goal, 6:51. Cardinals 3–0. Drive: 13 plays, 80 yards, 5:18.

Second quarter

- FSU – Carson Gulker 64-yard pass from Chase Carter (Eddie Jewett kick), 14:49. Bulldogs 7–3. Drive: 5 plays, 80 yards, 2:33.
- SVSU – Terrence Brown Jr. 23-yard pass from Mason McKenzie (Teagan Lenderink kick), 5:32. Cardinals 10–7. Drive: 12 plays, 80 yards, 5:07.
- SVSU – Mason McKenzie 15-yard run (Teagan Lenderink kick), 0:21. Cardinals 17–7. Drive: 1 play, 15 yards, 0:10.

Third quarter

- SVSU – Nick Patterson 6-yard run (Teagan Lenderink kick), 9:42. Cardinals 24–7. Drive: 4 plays, 15 yards, 2:02.
- FSU – Taariik Brett 3-yard pass from Chase Carter (Eddie Jewett kick), 7:13. Cardinals 24–14. Drive: 6 plays, 65 yards, 2:29.
- FSU – Cam Underwood 30-yard pass from Chase Carter (Eddie Jewett kick), 3:11. Cardinals 24–21. Drive: 4 plays, 39 yards, 1:59.
- FSU – Justin Payoute 38-yard interception return (Eddie Jewett kick), 1:36. Bulldogs 28–24.

Fourth quarter

- SVSU – Mason McKenzie 30-yard run (Teagan Lenderink kick), 11:21. Cardinals 31–28. Drive: 1 play, 30 yards, 0:09.
- FSU – Cam Underwood 13-yard pass from Chase Carter (Eddie Jewett kick), 8:35. Bulldogs 35–31. Drive: 5 plays, 23 yards, 2:39.
- FSU – Eddie Jewett 34-yard field goal, 3:45. Bulldogs 38–31. Drive: 8 plays, 24 yards, 4:24.
- SVSU – Zarek Zelinski 18-yard pass from Mason McMenzie (Teagan Lenderink kick), 1:55. Tied 38–38. Drive: 5 plays, 75 yards, 1:49.

Overtime

- FSU – Tae Boyd 22-yard pass from Brady Rose (Eddie Jewett kick). Bulldogs 45–38. Drive: 1 play, 22 yards.
- SVSU – Mason McKenzie 1-yard run (Teagan Lenderink kick). Tied 45–45. Drive: 7 plays, 25 yards.

Second overtime

- FSU – Tarriik Brett 12-yard run. Bulldogs 51–45. Drive: 4 plays, 25 yards.

Statistics	FSU	SVSU
First downs	20	22
Total yards	431	389
Rushing yards	188	211
Passing yards	243	178
Turnovers	6	2
Time of possession	28:24	31:36

Team	Category	Player	Statistics
Ferris State	Passing	Chase Carter	9/12, 208 yards, 4 TD
Ferris State	Rushing	Chase Carter	19 rushes, 67 yards
Ferris State	Receiving	Carson Gulker	3 receptions, 83 yards, TD
Saginaw Valley State	Passing	Mason McKenzie	17/30, 178 yards, 2 TD, INT
Saginaw Valley State	Rushing	Mason McKenzie	23 rushes, 85 yards, 3 TD
Saginaw Valley State	Receiving	Zarek Zelinski	4 receptions, 59 yards, TD

=== At Davenport ===
No. 1 Ferris State Bulldogs at Davenport Panthers – Game summary

Quarter	1	2	3	4	Total
No. 1 Bulldogs	7	16	7	14	44
Panthers	14	9	0	0	23

at Farmers Insurance Athletic Complex, Caledonia Township, Michigan

- Date: November 15
- Game time: 1:00 p.m. EST
- Game weather: Cloudy, 60 °F (16 °C)
- Game attendance: 1,266
- Referee: Bryce Muller
- Box score, Recap

Statistics	FSU	DAV
First downs	23	16
Total yards	458	313
Rushing yards	375	232
Passing yards	83	81
Turnovers	2	0
Time of possession	30:51	29:09

Team	Category	Player	Statistics
Ferris State	Passing	Wyatt Bower	6/10, 56 yards
Ferris State	Rushing	Chase Carter	20 rushes, 153 yards, 3 TD
Ferris State	Receiving	Taariik Brett	5 receptions, 33 yards
Davenport	Passing	Grant Thwaites	12/23, 81 yards
Davenport	Rushing	Cephus Harris	24 rushes, 185 yards, TD
Davenport	Receiving	George Sims	2 receptions, 33 yards

=== Northwood (NCAA Division II First Round) ===
NCAA Division II First Round
Northwood Timberwolves at No. 1 Ferris State Bulldogs – Game summary

Quarter	1	2	3	4	Total
Timberwolves	7	7	0	0	14
No. 1 Bulldogs	21	23	14	7	65

at Top Taggart Field, Big Rapids, Michigan

- Date: November 22
- Game time: 1:00 p.m. EST
- Game weather: Cloudy, 40 °F (4 °C)
- Game attendance: 3,124
- Referee: Tristan Severson
- Box score, Recap

Game information
First quarter
- FSU – Carson Gulker 7-yard pass from Chase Carter (Eddie Jewett kick), 10:13. Bulldogs 7–0. Drive: 11 plays, 75 yards, 4:47.
- FSU – Taariik Brett 23-yard pass from Chase Carter (Eddie Jewett kick), 6:32. Bulldogs 14–0. Drive: 5 plays, 50 yards, 2:12.
- NW – Gerry Hanson 31-yard pass from Ethan Hamby (Drew Cady kick), 4:27. Bulldogs 14–7. Drive: 5 plays, 55 yards, 1:59.
- FSU – Chase Carter 53-yard run (Eddie Jewett kick), 1:57. Bulldogs 21–7. Drive: 5 plays, 75 yards, 2:30.

Second quarter

- FSU – Jalen Jones 15-yard interception return (kick failed), 12:06. Bulldogs 27–7.
- FSU – Carson Gulker 11-yard run (Eddie Jewett kick), 3:49. Bulldogs 34–7. Drive: 5 plays, 60 yards, 1:39.
- FSU – Brady Rose 1-yard run (Eddie Jewett kick), 2:09. Bulldogs 41–7. Drive: 3 plays, 5 yards, 1:05.
- NW – Hudson Gerstacker 25-yard pass from Pauly Seely (Drew Cady kick), 1:12. Bulldogs 41–14. Drive: 6 plays, 75 yards, 0:57.
- FSU – Eddie Jewett 34-yard field goal, 0:00. Bulldogs 44–14. Drive: 11 plays, 58 yards, 1:05.

Third quarter

- FSU – Brady Rose 9-yard run (Eddie Jewett kick), 4:01. Bulldogs 51–14. Drive: 7 plays, 53 yards, 3:19.
- FSU – Chase Carter 40-yard run (Eddie Jewett kick), 2:29. Bulldogs 58–14. Drive: 2 plays, 40 yards, 0:10.

Fourth quarter

- FSU – LeeShaun Mumpfield 10-yard run (Eddie Jewett kick), 7:14. Bulldogs 65–14. Drive: 7 plays, 71 yards, 4:28.

Statistics	NW	FSU
First downs	14	27
Total yards	261	588
Rushing yards	130	432
Passing yards	131	156
Turnovers	4	2
Time of possession	25:44	34:16

Team	Category	Player	Statistics
Northwood	Passing	Pauly Seely	5/13, 75 yards, TD
Northwood	Rushing	Trent Hill	13 rushes, 56 yards
Northwood	Receiving	Hudson Gerstacker	2 receptions, 48 yards, TD
Ferris State	Passing	Chase Carter	11/21, 133 yards, 2 TD, INT
Ferris State	Rushing	Chase Carter	15 rushes, 152 yards, 2 TD
Ferris State	Receiving	Taariik Brett	3 receptions, 40 yards, TD

=== No. 18 Ashland (NCAA Division II Second Round) ===
NCAA Division II Second Round
No. 18 Ashland Eagles at No. 1 Ferris State Bulldogs – Game summary

Quarter	1	2	3	4	Total
No. 18 Eagles	14	3	0	7	24
No. 1 Bulldogs	14	14	21	7	56

at Top Taggart Field, Big Rapids, Michigan

- Date: November 29
- Game time: 1:00 p.m. EST
- Game weather: Snow, 27 °F (−3 °C)
- Game attendance: 1,326
- Referee: Richard Gray
- Box score, Recap

Game information
First quarter
- ASH – Jamari Croom 36-yard pass from Cameron Blair (Manaki Watanabe kick), 11:11. Eagles 7–0. Drive: 7 plays, 75 yards, 3:49.
- ASH – Chris Maloney 65-yard run (Manaki Watanabe kick), 7:26. Eagles 14–0. Drive: 5 plays, 80 yards, 2:47.
- FSU – Carson Gulker 2-yard run (Eddie Jewett kick), 4:21. Eagles 14–7. Drive: 7 plays, 44 yards, 2:58.
- FSU – Chase Carter 50-yard run (Eddie Jewett kick), 1:40. Tied 14–14. Drive: 2 plays, 55 yards, 0:15.

Second quarter

- ASH – Manaki Watanabe 33-yard field goal, 9:28. Eagles 17–14. Drive: 13 plays, 60 yards, 7:12.
- FSU – Cam Underwood 30-yard pass from Chase Carter (Eddie Jewett kick), 8:26. Bulldogs 21–17. Drive: 3 plays, 48 yards, 0:55.
- FSU – Taariik Brett 13-yard run (Eddie Jewett kick), 1:33. Bulldogs 28–17. Drive: 5 plays, 48 yards, 1:30.

Third quarter

- FSU – Brady Rose 34-yard pass from Chase Carter (Eddie Jewett kick), 11:32. Bulldogs 35–17. Drive: 7 plays, 76 yards, 3:22.
- FSU – Tae Boyd 27-yard pass from Chase Carter (Eddie Jewett kick), 10:53. Bulldogs 42–17. Drive: 2 plays, 35 yards, 0:34.
- FSU – Brady Rose 34-yard run (Eddie Jewett kick), 4:50. Bulldogs 49–17. Drive: 9 plays, 51 yards, 3:45.

Fourth quarter

- ASH – Jonathan Merrimee 7-yard pass from Cameron Blair (Manaki Watanabe kick), 13:17. Bulldogs 49–24. Drive: 11 plays, 75 yards, 6:33.
- FSU – Jake Price 4-yard run (Eddie Jewett kick), 1:56. Bulldogs 56–24. Drive: 6 plays, 88 yards, 3:31.

Statistics	ASH	FSU
First downs	20	22
Total yards	422	483
Rushing yards	300	348
Passing yards	122	135
Turnovers	2	1
Time of possession	38:39	21:21

Team	Category	Player	Statistics
Ashland	Passing	Cameron Blair	8/19, 122 yards, 2 TD, 2 INT
Ashland	Rushing	Chris Maloney	25 rushes, 198 yards, TD
Ashland	Receiving	Jamari Croom	3 receptions, 60 yards, TD
Ferris State	Passing	Chase Carter	9/17, 135 yards, 3 TD
Ferris State	Rushing	Chase Carter	10 rushes, 91 yards, TD
Ferris State	Receiving	Cam Underwood	4 receptions, 56 yards, TD

=== No. 21 Minnesota State (NCAA Division II Quarterfinal) ===
NCAA Division II Quarterfinal
No. 21 Minnesota State Mavericks at No. 1 Ferris State Bulldogs – Game summary

Quarter	1	2	3	4	Total
No. 21 Mavericks	7	7	7	8	29
No. 1 Bulldogs	3	21	7	21	52

at Top Taggart Field, Big Rapids, Michigan

- Date: December 6
- Game time: 1:00 p.m. EST
- Game weather: Cloudy, 28 °F (−2 °C)
- Game attendance: 1,582
- Referee: Dave Stewart
- Box score, Recap

Game information
First quarter
- FSU – Eddie Jewett 23-yard field goal, 11:18. Bulldogs 3–0. Drive: 9 plays, 69 yards, 3:42.
- MNST – Mitchell Thompson 1-yard run (Connor Fournier kick), 5:23. Mavericks 7–3. Drive: 12 plays, 75 yards, 5:52.

Second quarter

- FSU – Taariik Brett 6-yard pass from Chase Carter (Eddie Jewett kick), 10:09. Bulldogs 10–7. Drive: 12 plays, 46 yards, 7:16.
- FSU – Chase Carter 15-yard run (Eddie Jewett kick), 8:18. Bulldogs 17–7. Drive: 5 plays, 29 yards, 1:07.
- FSU – Chase Carter 30-yard run (Eddie Jewett kick), 6:03. Bulldogs 24–7. Drive: 4 plays, 65 yards, 1:19.
- MNST – Mitchell Thompson 2-yard run (Connor Fournier kick), 1:50. Bulldogs 24–14. Drive: 9 plays, 73 yards, 4:06.

Third quarter

- MNST – Amaun Williams 96-yard interception return (Connor Fournier kick), 6:33. Bulldogs 24–21.
- FSU – Carson Gulker 7-yard run (Eddie Jewett kick), 2:37. Bulldogs 31–21. Drive: 7 plays, 67 yards, 3:49.

Fourth quarter

- FSU – Brady Rose 41-yard pass from Chase Carter (Eddie Jewett kick), 12:25. Bulldogs 38–21. Drive: 4 plays, 57 yards, 2:18.
- FSU – Carson Gulker 10-yard run (Eddie Jewett kick), 7:58. Bulldogs 45–21. Drive: 5 plays, 33 yards, 2:31.
- MNST – Grant Guyett 23-yard pass from Mitchell Thompson (Mitchell Thompson pass to Nassir Jones), 3:54. Bulldogs 45–29. Drive: 12 plays, 71 yards, 4:01.
- FSU – Jake Price 1-yard run (Eddie Jewett kick), 0:35. Bulldogs 52–29. Drive: 5 plays, 47 yards, 2:08.

Statistics	MNST	FSU
First downs	16	28
Total yards	283	482
Rushing yards	118	307
Passing yards	165	175
Turnovers	3	2
Time of possession	25:03	34:57

Team	Category	Player	Statistics
Minnesota State	Passing	Mitchell Thompson	12/23, 151 yards, TD, 2 INT
Minnesota State	Rushing	Sam Backer	7 rushes, 47 yards
Minnesota State	Receiving	Grant Guyett	4 receptions, 59 yards, TD
Ferris State	Passing	Chase Carter	15/24, 175 yards, 2 TD, INT
Ferris State	Rushing	Chase Carter	22 rushes, 149 yards, 2 TD
Ferris State	Receiving	Brady Rose	5 receptions, 85 yards, TD

=== No. 16 Newberry (NCAA Division II Semifinal) ===
NCAA Division II Semifinal
No. 16 Newberry Wolves at No. 1 Ferris State Bulldogs – Game summary

Quarter	1	2	3	4	Total
No. 16 Wolves	7	10	0	0	17
No. 1 Bulldogs	21	14	14	0	49

at Top Taggart Field, Big Rapids, Michigan

- Date: December 13
- Game time: 12:00 p.m. EST
- Game weather: Cloudy, 11 °F (−12 °C)
- Game attendance: 1,089
- Referee: Jaime Martinez
- Box score, Recap

Game information
First quarter
- FSU – Tarick Bower 41-yard pass from Wyatt Bower (Eddie Jewett kick), 11:28. Bulldogs 7–0. Drive: 8 plays, 77 yards, 3:26.
- FSU – Jake Price 12-yard run (Eddie Jewett kick), 7:43. Bulldogs 14–0. Drive: 8 plays, 50 yards, 2:46.
- FSU – Jake Price 12-yard run (Eddie Jewett kick), 3:01. Bulldogs 21–0. Drive: 7 plays, 77 yards, 2:30.
- NEW – Will Young V 61-yard pass from Reed Charpia (Burke Nettles kick), 1:22. Bulldogs 21–7. Drive: 3 plays, 77 yards, 1:34.

Second quarter

- NEW – Coleman Gray 2-yard run (Burke Nettles kick), 11:46. Bulldogs 21–14. Drive: 8 plays, 49 yards, 3:07.
- NEW – Burke Nettles 39-yard field goal, 7:40. Bulldogs 21–17. Drive: 9 plays, 34 yards, 3:35.
- FSU – Taariik Brett 43-yard pass from Carson Gulker (Eddie Jewett kick), 1:53. Bulldogs 28–17. Drive: 6 plays, 82 yards, 2:16.
- FSU – Brady Rose 1-yard run (Eddie Jewett kick), 1:32. Bulldogs 35–17. Drive: 1 play, 1 yard, 0:02.

Third quarter

- FSU – Chase Carter 13-yard run (Eddie Jewett kick), 7:23. Bulldogs 42–17. Drive: 8 plays, 66 yards, 3:23.
- FSU – Jake Price 13-yard run (Eddie Jewett kick), 1:47. Bulldogs 49–17. Drive: 5 plays, 61 yards, 1:59.

Fourth quarter

- No scoring plays

Statistics	NEW	FSU
First downs	21	26
Total yards	392	511
Rushing yards	8	368
Passing yards	384	143
Turnovers	5	2
Time of possession	30:34	29:22

Team	Category	Player	Statistics
Newberry	Passing	Reed Charpia	30/48, 348 yards, TD, 5 INT
Newberry	Rushing	Kenmane Brunson	5 rushes, 23 yards
Newberry	Receiving	Will Young V	3 receptions, 96 yards, TD
Ferris State	Passing	Wyatt Bower	4/7, 94 yards, TD
Ferris State	Rushing	Carson Gulker	17 rushes, 115 yards
Ferris State	Receiving	Tarick Bower	2 receptions, 89 yards, TD

=== Vs. No. 2 Harding (NCAA Division II National Championship Game) ===
2025 NCAA Division II Championship Game
No. 2 Harding Bisons vs. No. 1 Ferris State Bulldogs – Game summary

Quarter	1	2	3	4	Total
No. 2 Bisons	0	14	7	0	21
No. 1 Bulldogs	14	7	21	0	42

at McKinney ISD Stadium, McKinney, Texas

- Date: December 20
- Game time: 4:00 p.m. EST / 3:00 p.m. CST
- Game weather: Sunny
- Game attendance: 10,521
- Referee: Richard Gray
- TV announcers (ESPN2): Shawn Kenney and Taylor McHargue
- Box score, Recap

Game information
First quarter
- FSU – Wyatt Bower 4-yard run (Eddie Jewett kick), 6:39. Bulldogs 7–0. Drive: 7 plays, 70 yards, 4:08.
- FSU – Wyatt Bower 4-yard run (Eddie Jewett kick), 4:32. Bulldogs 14–0. Drive: 5 plays, 33 yards, 1:53.

Second quarter

- HAR – Andrew Miller 9-yard run (Magnus Lepak kick), 14:21. Bulldogs 14–7. Drive: 9 plays, 89 yards, 0:39.
- FSU – Cam Underwood 23-yard pass from Wyatt Bower (Eddie Jewett kick), 2:08. Bulldogs 21–7. Drive: 12 plays, 95 yards, 5:28.
- HAR – Christian Franklin 15-yard pass from Cole Keylan (Magnus Lepak kick), 0:46. Bulldogs 21–14. Drive: 5 plays, 71 yards, 1:14.

Third quarter

- FSU – Chase Carter 64-yard run (Eddie Jewett kick), 14:21. Bulldogs 28–14. Drive: 2 plays, 75 yards, 0:39.
- HAR – G'Kyson Wyatt 90-yard kickoff return (Magnus Lepak kick), 14:09. Bulldogs 28–21.
- FSU – Wyatt Bower 3-yard run (Eddie Jewett kick), 13:13. Bulldogs 35–21. Drive: 3 plays, 75 yards, 0:56.
- FSU – Carson Gulker 14-yard pass from Wyatt Bower (Eddie Jewett kick), 6:14. Bulldogs 42–21. Drive: 5 plays, 60 yards, 2:37.

Fourth quarter

- No scoring plays

Statistics	HAR	FSU
First downs	18	26
Total yards	326	587
Rushing yards	246	363
Passing yards	80	224
Turnovers	2	1
Time of possession	27:01	28:28

Team	Category	Player	Statistics
Harding	Passing	Cole Keylon	3/5, 80 yards, TD
Harding	Rushing	Christian Franklin	9 rushes, 76 yards
Harding	Receiving	Brady Barnett	1 reception, 42 yards
Ferris State	Passing	Wyatt Bower	10/16, 177 yards, 2 TD
Ferris State	Rushing	Chase Carter	7 rushes, 111 yards, TD
Ferris State	Receiving	Carson Gulker	3 receptions, 52 yards, TD
