= 2025 NCAA Division II football rankings =

Rankings for the 2025 NCAA Division II football season

- Season: 2025
- Postseason: Single-elimination
- Preseason No. 1: Ferris State
- National champions: Ferris State
- Conference with most teams in final AFCA poll: NSIC & RMAC (3)

The 2025 National Collegiate Athletic Association (NCAA) Division II football rankings consists primarily of the AFCA Coaches Poll, determined by coaches part of NCAA Division II football programs. The following weekly polls determine the top 25 teams at the NCAA Division II level of college football for the 2025 season.

== Legend ==
	Increase in ranking
	Decrease in ranking
	Not ranked previous week or no change
	Selected for Division II Football Championship Playoffs
(#–#)	Win–loss record
(Italics)	Number of first place votes
т	Tied with team above or below also with this symbol

== AFCA poll ==
	Preseason August 11	Week 1 September 2	Week 2 September 8	Week 3 September 15	Week 4 September 22	Week 5 September 29	Week 6 October 6	Week 7 October 13	Week 8 October 20	Week 9 October 27	Week 10 November 3	Week 11 November 10	Week 12 November 17	Week 13 (Final) December 22	
1.	Ferris State (30)	Ferris State (1–0) (31)	Ferris State (2–0) (31)	Ferris State (3–0) (31)	Ferris State (4–0) (31)	Ferris State (4–0) (31)	Ferris State (5–0) (31)	Ferris State (6–0) (31)	Ferris State (7–0) (30)	Ferris State (8–0) (31)	Ferris State (9–0) (31)	Ferris State (10–0) (29)	Ferris State (11–0) (30)	Ferris State (16–0) (30)	1.
2.	Harding	Harding (0–0)	Harding (1–0)	Harding (2–0)	Harding (3–0)	Harding (4–0)	Harding (5–0)	Harding (6–0)	Harding (7–0)	Harding (8–0)	Harding (9–0)	Harding (10–0) (2)	Harding (11–0) (1)	Harding (15–1)	2.
3.	Grand Valley State	Grand Valley State (1–0)	Grand Valley State (2–0)	West Florida (3–0)	West Florida (4–0)	West Florida (4–0)	West Florida (5–0)	West Florida (6–0)	West Florida (7–0)	West Florida (8–0)	West Florida (9–0)	West Florida (9–0)	Kutztown (11–0)	Kutztown (14–1)	3.
4.	Slippery Rock (1)	Slippery Rock (0–0)	Slippery Rock (1–0)	Slippery Rock (2–0)	Slippery Rock (3–0)	Kutztown (4–0)	Kutztown (5–0)	Kutztown (6–0)	Kutztown (7–0)	Kutztown (8–0)	Kutztown (9–0)	Kutztown (10–0)	CSU Pueblo (10–1)	Newberry (12–2)	4.
5.	Central Oklahoma	CSU Pueblo (1–0)	West Florida (2–0)	Kutztown (2–0)	Kutztown (3–0)	Angelo State (4–0)	Western Colorado (5–0)	Western Colorado (6–0)	Augustana (SD) (7–0)	Augustana (SD) (8–0)	Augustana (SD) (9–0)	CSU Pueblo (9–1)	Central Washington (10–1)	UT Permian Basin (11–3)	5.
6.	CSU Pueblo	West Florida (1–0)	Kutztown (1–0)	Angelo State (3–0)	Angelo State (4–0)	California (PA) (4–0)	UT Permian Basin (5–0)	Augustana (SD) (7–0)	Western Colorado (7–0)	Western Colorado (8–0)	CSU Pueblo (8–1)	Central Washington (9–1)	Pittsburg State (9–2)	Pittsburg State (10–3)	6.
7.	Kutztown	Kutztown (0–0)	Minnesota State (2–0)	Western Colorado (2–0)	Western Colorado (3–0)	Western Colorado (4–0)	Augustana (SD) (6–0)	Grand Valley State (4–1)	CSU Pueblo (7–1)	CSU Pueblo (7–1)	Central Washington (8–1)	Pittsburg State (8–2)	Minnesota Duluth (10–1)	Albany State (12–2)	7.
8.	West Florida	Minnesota State (1–0)	Angelo State (2–0)	California (PA) (2–0)	California (PA) (3–0)	Augustana (SD) (5–0)	Grand Valley State (3–1)	West Alabama (5–0)	Central Washington (6–1)	Central Washington (7–1)	Pittsburg State (7–2)	Findlay (10–0)	Indianapolis (10–1)	Minnesota State (10–4)	8.
9.	Pittsburg State	Western Colorado (1–0)	Western Colorado (2–0)	Augustana (SD) (3–0)	Augustana (SD) (4–0)	UT Permian Basin (4–0)	West Alabama (5–0)	CSU Pueblo (6–1)	Minnesota State (6–1)	Pittsburg State (6–2)	Findlay (9–0)	Virginia Union (9–1)	West Florida (9–1)	West Florida (10–2)	9.
10.	Western Colorado	Angelo State (1–0)	California (PA) (1–0)	Grand Valley State (2–1)	Grand Valley State (2–1)	Grand Valley State (2–1)	Minnesota Duluth (6–0)	Central Washington (5–1)	Pittsburg State (6–2)	Virginia Union (7–1)	Virginia Union (8–1)	Indianapolis (9–1)	UT Permian Basin (9–2)	Indianapolis (11–2)	10.
11.	Minnesota State	Valdosta State (1–0)	Augustana (SD) (2–0)	UT Permian Basin (2–0)	UT Permian Basin (3–0)	West Alabama (5–0)	CSU Pueblo (5–1)	Minnesota State (6–1)	West Alabama (5–1)	Findlay (8–0)	Western Colorado (8–1)	Minnesota Duluth (9–1)	Johnson C. Smith (10–1)	CSU Pueblo (10–2)	11.
12.	Valdosta State	Charleston (WV) (1–0)	UT Permian Basin (2–0)	CSU Pueblo (2–1)	CSU Pueblo (3–1)	CSU Pueblo (4–1)	Angelo State (4–1)	Pittsburg State (5–2)	Virginia Union (6–1)	Indianapolis (7–1)	Indianapolis (8–1)	Northwest Missouri State (9–1)	Findlay (10–1)	Western Colorado (10–3)	12.
13.	Angelo State	Pittsburg State (0–1)	Virginia Union (1–0)	West Alabama (3–0)	West Alabama (4–0)	Minnesota Duluth (5–0)	Central Washington (4–1)	UT Permian Basin (5–1)	Indianapolis (7–1)	Minnesota Duluth (7–1)	Minnesota Duluth (8–1)	Augustana (SD) (9–1)	Albany State (10–1)	Central Washington (10–2)	13.
14.	Charleston (WV)	California (PA) (0–0)	CSU Pueblo (1–1)	Minnesota State (2–1)	Minnesota State (3–1)	Slippery Rock (3–1)	Minnesota State (5–1)	Virginia Union (5–1)	Findlay (7–0)	Northwest Missouri State (7–1)	Northwest Missouri State (8–1)	Minnesota State (8–2)	Northwest Missouri State (9–2)	Frostburg State (11–3)	14.
15.	California (PA)	Ouachita Baptist (0–0)	Central Oklahoma (1–1)	Central Oklahoma (1–1)	Central Oklahoma (2–1)	Minnesota State (4–1)	Pittsburg State (4–2)	Indianapolis (6–1)	Minnesota Duluth (6–1)	Delta State (7–1)	Ashland (8–1)	UT Permian Basin (8–2)	Western Colorado (9–2)	Ashland (10–3)	15.
16.	Bemidji State	Virginia Union (1–0)	Delta State (2–0)	Minnesota Duluth (3–0)	Minnesota Duluth (4–0)	Central Washington (3–1)	California (PA) (4–1)	Findlay (6–0) т	Northwest Missouri State (6–1)	Angelo State (6–2)	Minnesota State (7–2)	Johnson C. Smith (9–1)	Newberry (9–1)	Minnesota Duluth (10–2)	16.
17.	Lenoir–Rhyne	Indianapolis (1–0)	West Alabama (2–0)	Central Washington (1–1)	Central Washington (2–1)	Pittsburg State (3–2)	Virginia Union (4–1)	Minnesota Duluth (6–1) т	Delta State (6–1)	Ashland (7–1)	UT Permian Basin (7–2)	Albany State (9–1)	Virginia Union (9–2)	Northwest Missouri State (9–3)	17.
18.	Ouachita Baptist	Central Washington (1–0)	Central Washington (1–1) т	Pittsburg State (1–2)	Pittsburg State (2–2)	Virginia Union (3–1)	Indianapolis (5–1)	Delta State (5–1)	Grand Valley State (4–2)	Minnesota State (6–2)	Johnson C. Smith (8–1)	Western Colorado (8–2)	Ashland (9–2)	Johnson C. Smith (10–2)	18.
19.	Virginia Union	Central Oklahoma (0–1)	Charleston (WV) (1–1) т	Lenoir–Rhyne (2–1)	Wingate (3–0)	Indianapolis (4–1)	Findlay (5–0)	Northwest Missouri State (5–1)	Angelo State (5–2)	Johnson C. Smith (7–1)	Albany State (8–1)	Newberry (9–1)	Augustana (SD) (9–2)	Findlay (10–2)	19.
20.	Indianapolis	Augustana (SD) (1–0)	Ashland (1–0)	Valdosta State (2–1)	Valdosta State (2–1)	Delta State (4–1)	Delta State (5–1)	UNC Pembroke (6–1)	Ashland (6–1)	UT Permian Basin (6–2)	Slippery Rock (6–2)	Ashland (8–2)	Grand Valley State (7–3)	Benedict (10–3)	20.
21.	Central Washington	UT Permian Basin (1–0)	Lenoir–Rhyne (1–1)	Johnson C. Smith (3–0)	Virginia Union (2–1)	Findlay (4–0)	Frostburg State (5–0)	Angelo State (4–2)	Benedict (7–0)	West Alabama (5–2)	Delta State (7–2)	Grand Valley State (6–3)	Minnesota State (8–3)	Virginia Union (9–3)	21.
22.	Central Missouri	Delta State (1–0)	Valdosta State (1–1)	Virginia Union (1–1)	Indianapolis (3–1)	Carson–Newman (3–1)	Northwest Missouri State (4–1)	Ashland (5–1)	Johnson C. Smith (6–1)	Slippery Rock (5–2)	Angelo State (6–3)	Chadron State (8–2)	Chadron State (8–3)	California (PA) (9–4)	22.
23.	Augustana (SD)	Ashland (1–0)	Carson–Newman (1–0)	Wingate (2–0)	Delta State (3–1)	Frostburg State (4–0)	UNC Pembroke (5–1)	Johnson C. Smith (5–1)	UT Permian Basin (5–2)	Albany State (7–1)	Grand Valley State (5–3)	Benedict (9–1)	Benedict (9–2)	Chadron State (8–4)	23.
24.	Ashland т	Lenoir–Rhyne (0–1)	Minnesota Duluth (2–0) т	Michigan Tech (3–0)	Henderson State (3–0)	Northwest Missouri State (4–1)	Ashland (4–1) т Johnson C. Smith (5–1) т	Benedict (6–0)	Slippery Rock (5–2)	Frostburg State (7–1)	Assumption (7–1)	Western Oregon (8–2)	Frostburg State (9–2)	Assumption (9–3)	24.
25.	Miles т	West Alabama (1–0)	Pittsburg State (0–2) т	Sioux Falls (3–0)	Findlay (3–0)	UNC Pembroke (4–1)	Slippery Rock (3–2) т	Slippery Rock (4–2)	Southern Arkansas (6–1)	Grand Valley State (4–3)	Newberry (8–1)	UNC Pembroke (8–2)	Western Oregon (8–3)	Augustana (SD) (9–2)	25.
	Preseason August 11	Week 1 September 2	Week 2 September 8	Week 3 September 15	Week 4 September 22	Week 5 September 29	Week 6 October 6	Week 7 October 13	Week 8 October 20	Week 9 October 27	Week 10 November 3	Week 11 November 10	Week 12 November 17	Week 13 (Final) December 22	
		Dropped: Bemidji State; Central Missouri; Miles	Dropped: Ouachita Baptist; Indianapolis	Dropped: Delta State; Charleston (WV); Ashland; Carson–Newman	Dropped: Lenoir–Rhyne; Johnson C. Smith; Michigan Tech; Sioux Falls	Dropped: Central Oklahoma; Wingate; Valdosta State; Henderson State	Dropped: Carson–Newman	Dropped: California (PA); Frostburg State	Dropped: UNC Pembroke	Dropped: Benedict; Southern Arkansas	Dropped: West Alabama; Frostburg State	Dropped: Slippery Rock; Delta State; Angelo State; Assumption	Dropped: UNC Pembroke	Dropped: Grand Valley State; Western Oregon	

== D2Football.com poll ==
	Preseason August 17	Week 1 September 1	Week 2 September 8	Week 3 September 15	Week 4 September 22	Week 5 September 29	Week 6 October 6	Week 7 October 13	Week 8 October 20	Week 9 October 27	Week 10 November 3	Week 11 November 10	Week 12 November 17	Week 13 (Final) December 22	
1.	Ferris State	Ferris State (1–0)	Ferris State (2–0)	Ferris State (3–0)	Ferris State (4–0)	Ferris State (4–0)	Ferris State (5–0)	Ferris State (6–0)	Ferris State (7–0)	Ferris State (8–0)	Ferris State (9–0)	Ferris State (10–0)	Ferris State (11–0)	Ferris State (16–0)	1.
2.	Harding	Harding (0–0)	Harding (1–0)	Harding (2–0)	Harding (3–0)	Harding (4–0)	Harding (5–0)	Harding (6–0)	Harding (7–0)	Harding (8–0)	Harding (9–0)	Harding (10–0)	Harding (11–0)	Harding (15–1)	2.
3.	Central Oklahoma	Minnesota State (1–0)	Minnesota State (2–0)	Kutztown (2–0)	Kutztown (3–0)	Kutztown (4–0)	Kutztown (5–0)	Kutztown (6–0)	Kutztown (7–0)	Kutztown (8–0)	Kutztown (9–0)	Kutztown (10–0)	Kutztown (11–0)	UT Permian Basin (11–3)	3.
4.	Minnesota State	Kutztown (0–0)	Kutztown (1–0)	West Florida (3–0)	West Florida (4–0)	West Florida (4–0)	UT Permian Basin (5–0)	West Florida (6–0)	West Florida (7–0)	West Florida (8–0)	West Florida (9–0)	West Florida (9–0)	Pittsburg State (9–2)	Kutztown (14–1)	4.
5.	Kutztown	Grand Valley State (1–0)	Grand Valley State (2–0)	Western Colorado (2–0)	Western Colorado (3–0)	Western Colorado (4–0)	West Florida (5–0)	Western Colorado (6–0)	Western Colorado (7–0)	Western Colorado (8–0)	Pittsburg State (7–2)	Pittsburg State (8–2)	Central Washington (10–1)	Newberry (12–2)	5.
6.	Grand Valley State	CSU Pueblo (1–0)	Western Colorado (2–0)	Angelo State (3–0)	Angelo State (4–0)	Angelo State (4–0)	Western Colorado (5–0)	Pittsburg State (5–2)	Pittsburg State (6–2)	Pittsburg State (6–2)	Central Washington (8–1)	Central Washington (9–1)	CSU Pueblo (10–1)	Pittsburg State (10–3)	6.
7.	CSU Pueblo	Western Colorado (1–0)	West Florida (2–0)	UT Permian Basin (2–0)	UT Permian Basin (3–0)	UT Permian Basin (4–0)	Pittsburg State (4–2)	Central Washington (5–1)	Central Washington (6–1)	Central Washington (7–1)	CSU Pueblo (8–1)	CSU Pueblo (9–1)	Minnesota Duluth (10–1)	Minnesota State (10–4)	7.
8.	Western Colorado	West Florida (1–0)	Angelo State (2–0)	Central Oklahoma (1–1)	Central Oklahoma (2–1)	Pittsburg State (3–2)	Minnesota Duluth (6–0)	Minnesota State (6–1)	Minnesota State (6–1)	CSU Pueblo (7–1)	Augustana (SD) (9–0)	Minnesota Duluth (9–1)	West Florida (9–1)	Northwest Missouri State (9–3)	8.
9.	Slippery Rock	Slippery Rock (0–0)	Slippery Rock (1–0)	Slippery Rock (2–0)	Slippery Rock (3–0)	Minnesota Duluth (5–0)	Minnesota State (5–1)	CSU Pueblo (6–1)	CSU Pueblo (7–1)	Augustana (SD) (8–0)	Western Colorado (8–1)	Northwest Missouri State (9–1)	Northwest Missouri State (9–2)	Albany State (12–2)	9.
10.	Pittsburg State	Angelo State (1–0)	UT Permian Basin (2–0)	Pittsburg State (1–2)	Pittsburg State (2–2)	Minnesota State (4–1)	Angelo State (4–1)	Augustana (SD) (7–0)	Augustana (SD) (7–0)	Minnesota Duluth (7–1)	Minnesota Duluth (8–1)	Findlay (10–0)	Indianapolis (9–1)	West Florida (10–2)	10.
11.	West Florida	Ouachita Baptist (0–0)	Augustana (SD) (2–0)	Minnesota Duluth (3–0)	Minnesota Duluth (4–0)	California (PA) (4–0)	CSU Pueblo (5–1)	UT Permian Basin (5–1)	Minnesota Duluth (6–1)	Northwest Missouri State (7–1)	Northwest Missouri State (8–1)	Indianapolis (8–1)	UT Permian Basin (9–2)	Western Colorado (10–3)	11.
12.	Angelo State	Pittsburg State (0–1)	Central Oklahoma (1–1)	CSU Pueblo (2–1)	CSU Pueblo (3–1)	CSU Pueblo (4–1)	Augustana (SD) (6–0)	Grand Valley State (4–1)	Northwest Missouri State (6–1)	Indianapolis (7–1)	Indianapolis (7–1)	Virginia Union (9–1)	Findlay (10–1)	Indianapolis (11–2)	12.
13.	Ouachita Baptist	Indianapolis (1–0)	CSU Pueblo (1–1)	Augustana (SD) (3–0)	Augustana (SD) (4–0)	Augustana (SD) (5–0)	Grand Valley State (3–1)	West Alabama (5–0)	Indianapolis (6–1)	Virginia Union (7–1)	Virginia Union (8–1)	UT Permian Basin (8–2)	Johnson C. Smith (10–1)	Central Washington (10–2)	13.
14.	Lenoir–Rhyne	Valdosta State (1–0)	California (PA) (1–0)	Minnesota State (2–1)	Minnesota State (3–1)	Grand Valley State (2–1)	West Alabama (6–0)	Minnesota Duluth (6–1)	Virginia Union (6–1)	Findlay (8–0)	Findlay (9–0)	Minnesota State (8–2)	Newberry (9–1)	CSU Pueblo (10–2)	14.
15.	Indianapolis	Augustana (SD) (1–0)	Virginia Union (1–0)	Grand Valley State (2–1)	Grand Valley State (2–1)	West Alabama (5–0)	Central Washington (4–1)	Northwest Missouri State (5–1)	Findlay (7–0)	Ashland (7–1)	Ashland (8–1)	Augustana (SD) (9–1)	Albany State (10–1)	Ashland (10–3)	15.
16.	Augustana (SD)	UT Permian Basin (1–0)	Pittsburg State (0–2)	California (PA) (2–0)	California (PA) (3–0)	Slippery Rock (3–1)	Indianapolis (4–1)	Indianapolis (5–1)	Ashland (6–1)	Delta State (7–1)	UT Permian Basin (7–2)	Johnson C. Smith (9–1)	Wingate (9–2)	Minnesota Duluth (10–2)	16.
17.	Valdosta State	Central Oklahoma (0–1)	Lenoir–Rhyne (1–1)	Lenoir–Rhyne (2–1)	West Alabama (4–0)	Central Washington (3–1)	Virginia Union (4–1)	Virginia Union (5–1)	West Alabama (5–1)	UT Permian Basin (6–2)	Johnson C. Smith (8–1)	Newberry (9–1)	Chadron State (8–3)	Findlay (10–2)	17.
18.	California (PA)	California (PA) (0–0)	West Alabama (2–0)	West Alabama (3–0)	Central Washington (2–1)	Indianapolis (3–1)	Northwest Missouri State (4–1)	Findlay (6–0)	UT Permian Basin (5–2)	Angelo State (6–2)	Newberry (8–1)	Albany State (9–1)	Western Colorado (9–2)	Chadron State (8–4)	18.
19.	Bemidji State	Virginia Union (1–0)	Delta State (2–0)	Central Washington (1–1)	Indianapolis (3–1)	Virginia Union (3–1)	California (PA) (4–1)	UNC Pembroke (6–1)	Delta State (6–1)	Johnson C. Smith (7–1)	Minnesota State (7–2)	Chadron State (8–2)	Virginia Union (9–2)	Grand Valley State (7–3)	19.
20.	Fort Hays State	Lenoir–Rhyne (0–1)	Ashland (1–0)	Fort Hays State (2–1)	Wingate (3–0)	Northwest Missouri State (4–1)	Fort Hays State (4–2)	Ashland (5–1)	Angelo State (5–2)	Newberry (7–1)	Albany State (8–1)	Western Oregon (8–2)	Ashland (9–2)	Frostburg State (11–3)	20.
21.	Virginia Union	Charleston (WV) (1–0)	Central Washington (1–1)	Johnson C. Smith (3–0)	Virginia Union (2–1)	Fort Hays State (3–2)	Findlay (5–0)	Delta State (5–1)	Johnson C. Smith (6–1)	Minnesota State (6–2)	Western Oregon (7–2)	Wingate (8–2)	Minnesota State (8–3)	California (PA) (9–4)	21.
22.	Charleston (WV)	West Alabama (1–0)	Fort Hays State (1–1)	Indianapolis (2–1)	Fort Hays State (2–2)	Carson–Newman (3–1)	UNC Pembroke (5–1)	Emory & Henry (6–1)	Southern Arkansas (6–1)	Albany State (7–1)	Chadron State (7–2)	Western Colorado (8–2)	Augustana (SD) (9–2)	Benedict (10–3)	22.
23.	West Alabama	Central Washington (1–0)	Johnson C. Smith (2–0)	Colorado Mines (2–0)	Virginia State (2–1)	Findlay (4–0)	Ashland (4–1)	Angelo State (4–2)	Benedict (7–0)	West Alabama (5–2)	Wingate (7–2)	Ashland (8–2)	Grand Valley State (7–3)	Johnson C. Smith (10–2)	23.
24.	Central Missouri	Delta State (1–0)	Colorado Mines (1–0)	Michigan Tech (3–0)	Findlay (3–0)	UNC Pembroke (4–1)	Emory and Henry (5–1)	Johnson C. Smith (5–1)	Newberry (6–1)	Northwood (7–1)	Delta State (7–2)	IUP (7–2)	Northwood (9–2)	Northeastern State (9–3)	24.
25.	Ashland	Ashland (0–0)	Indianapolis (1–1)	Virginia Union (1–1)	Ashland (2–1)	Ashland (3–1)	Delta State (5–1)	Southern Arkansas (5–1)	Grand Valley State (4–2)	Frostburg State (7–1)	Assumption (7–1)	Grand Valley State (6–3)	IUP (7–3)	Augustana (SD) (9–2)	25.
	Preseason August 17	Week 1 September 1	Week 2 September 8	Week 3 September 15	Week 4 September 22	Week 5 September 29	Week 6 October 6	Week 7 October 13	Week 8 October 20	Week 9 October 27	Week 10 November 3	Week 11 November 10	Week 12 November 17	Week 13 (Final) December 22	
		Dropped: Bemidji State; Fort Hays State; Central Missouri	Dropped: Ouachita Baptist; Valdosta State; Charleston (WV)	Dropped: Delta State; Ashland	Dropped: Johnson C. Smith; Michigan Tech; Colorado Mines; Lenoir–Rhyne	Dropped: Central Oklahoma; Wingate; Virginia State	Dropped: Slippery Rock; Carson–Newman	Dropped: California (PA); Fort Hays State	Dropped: UNC Pembroke; Emory and Henry	Dropped: Southern Arkansas; Benedict; Grand Valley State	Dropped: Angelo State; West Alabama; Northwood; Frostburg State	Dropped: Delta State; Assumption	Dropped: Western Oregon	Dropped: Wingate; Virginia Union; Northwood; IUP	
