= Flexbone formation =

American football formation

The flexbone formations contains two slotbacks (SB), two wide receivers (WR) or one receiver and one tight end (TE) or two tight ends, a quarterback (QB), a fullback (FB), and five down linemen (OL).

The flexbone formation is an offensive formation in American football that includes a quarterback, five offensive linemen, three running backs, and varying numbers of tight ends and wide receivers. The flexbone formation is derived from the wishbone formation and features a quarterback under center with a fullback lined up directly behind the quarterback. There are two smaller running backs called slotbacks aligned behind the line of scrimmage on each side of the offensive line. The slotbacks are sometimes incorrectly referred to as wingbacks. But in order to be a wingback, there must be a guard, tackle and tight end all on one side of the center on the line of scrimmage and then the wingback off the line of scrimmage (as featured in the unbalanced formation diagram).

== Triple option ==
An unbalanced flexbone formation with a slotback (SB), wingback (WB), wide receiver (WR), tight end (TE), quarterback (QB), fullback (FB), and five down linemen (OL).

The basic play run from the flexbone is known as a triple option, or veer. Often the quarterback first sends one of the slotbacks in motion to the other side. While he is still in motion behind the fullback, the quarterback then receives the ball from the center. Next, the fullback (FB) either takes the football from the quarterback or 'fakes' that he has taken the football. If the fullback takes the football, then he runs straight into the line of scrimmage and attempts to gain yardage. If the fullback does not take the football, then the quarterback sprints parallel to the line of scrimmage with the motion slotback trailing him. The quarterback can either turn upfield or pitch the football to the trailing slotback. Hence the term triple because the fullback is option number one, the quarterback keeping the ball is option number two, and the quarterback pitching to the slotback is option number three. The triple option forces defenses to worry about fullbacks running in the middle of the offensive line and to worry about quarterbacks and slotbacks running to the outside of the line. The decision of who is to carry the ball (which option to make) can either be made before the play in the huddle, or during the play by the QB, who will make decisions based on the position and play of certain defensive players and what they are doing. The quarterback reads the defensive end on the side the play is going to when deciding whether to hand to the fullback or to keep it himself. If he sees the end is committed to stopping the fullback in the middle, the QB will keep it. If the end is staying back to contain the QB on the outside, he will give it to the fullback. If the quarterback does not hand to the FB, he will then read the end to see if he is committed to playing the SB on the pitch or the QB. If he is playing the QB, then he will pitch it to the slotback. If the end is committed to stopping the slotback on the pitch, the QB will take the ball upfield himself.

== Purpose ==
Arguably, the two most difficult positions on offense to develop quickly are wide receivers and quarterbacks. A style of play was needed for teams that could not field strong throwing quarterbacks. In the flexbone formation, intelligent and athletic personnel can adapt to playing a quarterback's position without having to throw the ball very well. Flexbone teams are often playing against more talented teams so they must use time management and trickery of the flexbone to even the playing field. By running the ball almost exclusively, a flexbone offense also runs the game clock and limits the opposing teams’ possibly faster and stronger offense from scoring against their own defense.

Another key consideration is that the flexbone formation gives the offense four potential vertical receiving threats at the snap: the two wide receivers and the two slotbacks. This is something that alternative formations such as the I-formation or the traditional wishbone cannot achieve without pre-snap motion that tips the offense's hand. This advantage allows the four-verticals play, a deadly weapon against Cover 3, a common defensive coverage used by the eight-man fronts that a strong running team is likely to face.

Since this offense is primarily used by service academies (Air Force, Army, Navy and The Citadel), it helps alleviate the inherent unbalance related to recruiting and being unable to recruit the type of talent that a larger school like Oklahoma or Alabama might be able to. The Flexbone allows for QBs who may be shorter or smaller than ideal (5'10 - 6'2 and weighing around 185-205 pounds) to be able to start because they often have a speed advantage despite not being able to throw the ball as well.

As a result of the misdirection and the size of the outside WRs (usually 6'2 or taller and over 200 pounds) to help block, the slotbacks can be similarly sized to the QB. This allows for the Flexbone to have three players who can run fast (with SBs also helping serve as receivers or lead blockers) while the FB can be a more traditional HB size of 220-235 pounds.

== Requirements to succeed ==
- The offense needs an intelligent and fast quarterback who isn't afraid to take a hit. The quarterback must be able to read a run defense in order to exploit the holes. His read will determine how to develop an option play. Good flexbone quarterbacks are capable of manipulating overpursuing defenses.
- The fullback must be strong enough to break tackles and draw the attention of linebackers and defensive linemen. Good flexbone fullbacks are usually the best ball carriers on the team and receive the majority of rushing attempts. A flexbone fullback is usually smaller and faster than a typical fullback seen in conventional offenses.
- The slotbacks must be balanced athletically, capable of trailing the quarterback, and good receivers. If the slotbacks are not of equal talent, then a defense can predict which direction the play will develop. Slotbacks typically need to be capable pass receivers because they receive a great deal of high velocity pitches and are primary receivers during passing plays.
- The offensive line is smaller and lighter than offensive lines in traditional offenses. This is because linemen must be quick enough to get to linebackers and safeties. They also need to be strong enough to block the defensive line, although teams usually utilize double and combo blocking schemes to overcome the disadvantage in size.
- Wide receivers must be avid open field blockers. They are usually asked to block cornerbacks who are generally the fastest and quickest players on the opponent's defense. Wide receivers aren't at the highest priority in flexbone team's recruitment since they aren't after the greatest wide-outs in the market. However, flexbone receivers do need sure hands. As a run-heavy offense, flexbone can create a great deal of havoc amongst defenses if - along with strong run game - it can establish even the simplest passing attack with sure-handed receivers.

== Use of the flexbone formation ==
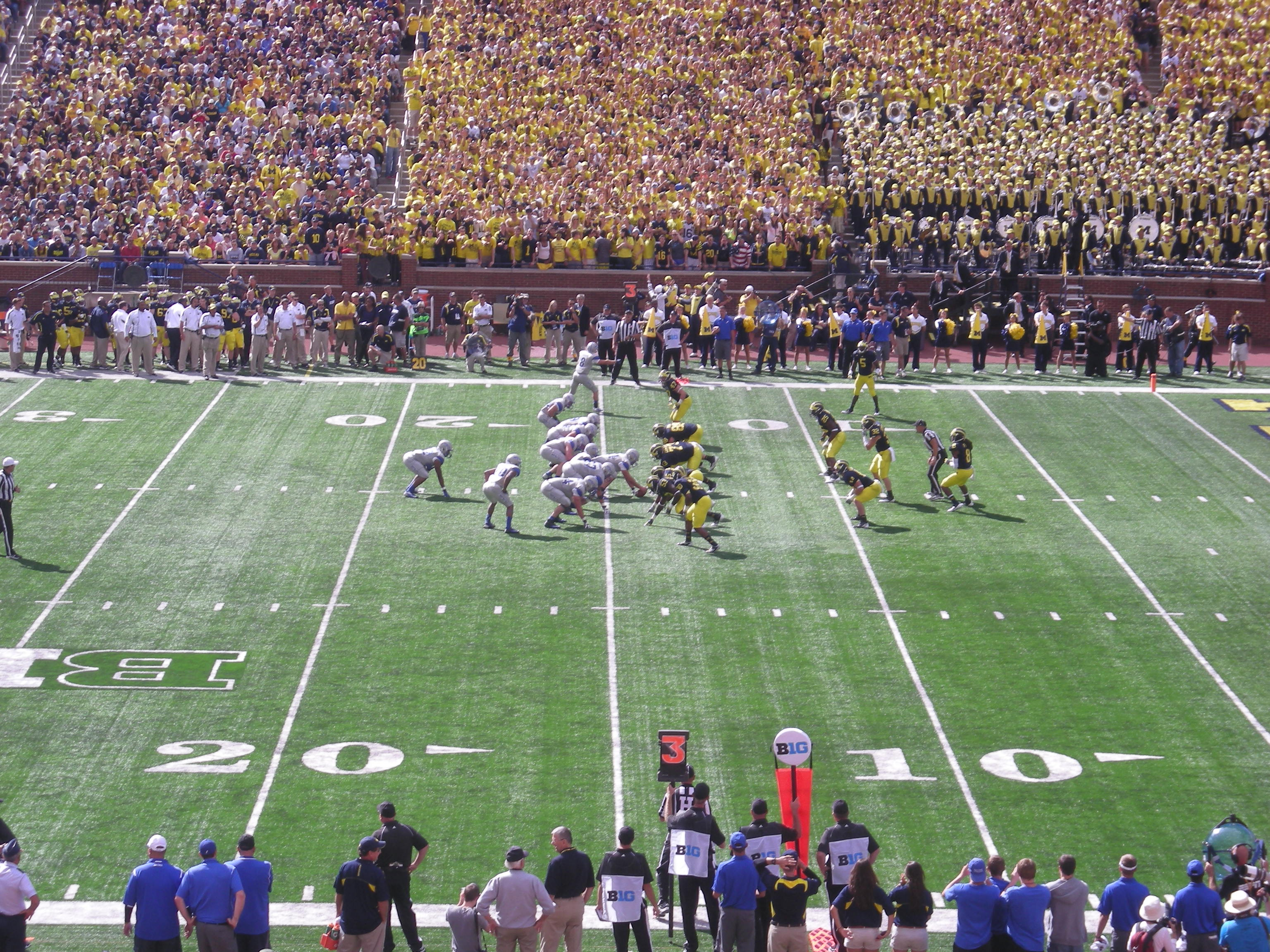
The Air Force Falcons in the flexbone formation against Michigan in 2012

In Division I Championship Subdivision football, Georgia Southern pioneered a version of the flexbone that won a record six NCAA Championship Subdivision National Titles and nine Southern Conference titles. Through the 2007 season, the United States Air Force Academy (Air Force) and the United States Naval Academy (Navy) were the last major remnants of flexbone football in FBS football and testaments to the formation's ability to use key offensive players effectively when a team has significantly less talent on the field. But with the hiring of former Navy head coach Paul Johnson (who also coached at Georgia Southern) in 2008, Georgia Tech became the first BCS conference school in approximately two decades to use a flexbone offense. In Johnson's first year at Georgia Tech, the Yellow Jackets shared the ACC Coastal Division title with Virginia Tech. In 2009, the Jackets beat Clemson in the ACC Championship game to get to the Capital One Orange Bowl. In 2014, Army hired Jeff Monken, who coached under Johnson, to run the flexbone in hopes of resurrecting the program as he'd done at Georgia Southern in 2010. In 2016 and just his 3rd season, Monken lead the Black Knights to an 8 win season and victory over Navy for the first time in 15 straight tries. In 2017, Army won 10 games including a back-to-back win over Navy, both of which hadn't happened since 1996. In the late 1980s, the University of Arkansas ran a version of the flexbone under coach Ken Hatfield and won two consecutive Southwest Conference titles.

Schools at the FCS (formerly I-AA) level that currently run the Flexbone include Wofford, The Citadel, and more recently the upstart program of the Kennesaw State Owls coached by Brian Bohannon who in 2017 lead the Owls to a 12–2 record and appearance in FCS playoffs in only the 3rd year of the program's existence. The Harding University Bisons, competing in the Great American Conference (GAC) of NCAA Division II, under coach Paul Simmons, ran a version of the flex-bone in its undefeated 2023 season. Harding won the Division II national championship in 2023, while also setting the all-time NCAA record in rushing yards for a season—for all divisions—with over 6,000. In the national championship game, Harding beat the Colorado School of Mines Orediggers 38–7, while compiling over 500 rushing yards in the game.

The flexbone offense is also popular at the high school football level.

== Famous flexbone coaches ==
- Fisher DeBerry – Air Force
- Paul Johnson – Georgia Southern, Navy, Georgia Tech
- Erk Russell – Georgia Southern
- Jeff Monken – Georgia Southern, Army
- Kelley Lee – Eastern New Mexico
- Ken Niumatalolo – Navy
- Ken Hatfield – Air Force, Arkansas, Clemson, Rice
