= 2025 NCAA Division II Football Championship Game =

Postseason college football game

2025 NCAA Division II Football Championship
| Harding Bisons | Ferris State Bulldogs |
| (15–0) | (15–0) |
| GAC | GLIAC |
| 21 | 42 |
| Head coach: Paul Simmons | Head coach: Tony Annese |
| Seed 3 | Seed 1 |
| | 1 | 2 | 3 | 4 | Total |
|---|---|---|---|---|---|
| Harding | 0 | 14 | 7 | 0 | 21 |
| Ferris State | 14 | 7 | 21 | 0 | 42 |
- Date: December 20, 2025
- Season: 2025
- Stadium: McKinney ISD Stadium
- Location: McKinney, Texas
- Attendance: 10,521

United States TV coverage
- Network: ESPN2/ESPN+

International TV coverage
- Network: Canada: TSN+

The 2025 NCAA Division II Football Championship Game was a college football game played on December 20, 2025, at McKinney ISD Stadium in McKinney, Texas. The game determined the national champion of NCAA Division II for the 2025 season. The game was scheduled to begin at 3:00 p.m. CST and aired on ESPN2 and ESPN+.

The game featured the two finalists of the 32-team playoff bracket, which began on November 22, 2025. The top-seed Ferris State Bulldogs from the Great Lakes Intercollegiate Athletic Conference (GLIAC) defeated the two-seed Harding Bisons from the Great American Conference (GAC), 42–21. The win gave the Ferris State football program its fourth national championship.

== Teams ==
The participants of the 2025 NCAA Division II Football Championship Game were the finalists of the 2025 Division II Playoffs, which began on November 22 with four 8-team brackets to determine super region champions, who then qualified for the national semifinals.

=== National semifinals ===
Super region champions were reseeded 1 to 4 for the national semifinals.

Semifinals; December 13, 2025; Hosted by higher seeded team
1 | Ferris State | 49
4 | Newberry | 17
2 | Kutztown | 27
3 | Harding | 49

Championship; December 20, 2025; McKinney, Texas
1 | Ferris State | 42
3 | Harding | 21

== Game summary ==
2025 NCAA Division II Football Championship Game

| Quarter | 1 | 2 | 3 | 4 | Total |
|---|---|---|---|---|---|
| No. 3 Harding | 0 | 14 | 7 | 0 | 21 |
| No. 1 Ferris State | 14 | 7 | 21 | 0 | 42 |

at McKinney ISD Stadium • McKinney, Texas

- Date: Saturday, December 20, 2025
- Game time: 3:00 p.m. CST
- Game attendance: 10,521
- TV: ESPN2/ESPN+

Scoring summary

| Quarter | Time | Drive | | | Team | Scoring information | Score | |
| Quarter | Time | Plays | Yards | TOP | Team | Scoring information | Harding | Ferris |
|---|---|---|---|---|---|---|---|---|
| 1 | 6:39 | 7 | 70 | | Ferris State | Wyatt Bower 4-yard touchdown run, Eddie Jewett kick good | 0 | 7 |
| 1 | 4:32 | 5 | 67 | | Ferris State | Wyatt Bower 4-yard touchdown run, Eddie Jewett kick good | 0 | 14 |
| 2 | 14:21 | 12 | 65 | | Harding | Andrew Miller 9-yard touchdown run, Magnus Lepak kick good | 7 | 14 |
| 2 | 2:08 | 13 | 95 | | Ferris State | Cam Underwood 23-yard touchdown reception from Wyatt Bower, Eddie Jewett kick good | 7 | 21 |
| 2 | 0:46 | 6 | 71 | | Harding | Christian Franklin 15-yard touchdown reception from Cole Keylon, Magnus Lepak kick good | 14 | 21 |
| 3 | 14:21 | 2 | 75 | | Ferris State | Chase Carter 64-yard touchdown run, Eddie Jewett kick good | 14 | 28 |
| 3 | 14:09 | 1 | 90 | | Harding | Kickoff returned 90 yards for touchdown by G'Kyson Wright, Magnus Lepak kick good | 21 | 28 |
| 3 | 13:13 | 3 | 75 | | Ferris State | Wyatt Bower 3-yard touchdown run, Eddie Jewett kick good | 21 | 35 |
| 3 | 6:14 | 5 | 60 | | Ferris State | Carson Gulker 14-yard touchdown reception from Wyatt Bower, Eddie Jewett kick good | 21 | 42 |
| "TOP" = time of possession. For other American football terms, see Glossary of American football. | | | | | | | 21 | 42 |

=== Statistics ===
| Statistics | HU | FSU |
|---|---|---|
| First downs | 18 | 26 |
| Plays–yards | 55–486 | 60–585 |
| Rushes–yards | 51–286 | 41–363 |
| Passing yards | 80 | 224 |
| Passing: comp–att–int | 5–3–0 | 12–19–0 |
| Time of possession | | |

| Team | Category | Player | Statistics |
|---|---|---|---|
| Harding | Passing | Cole Keylon | 3/5, 80 yards, 1 TD |
| Harding | Rushing | Andrew Miller | 22 rushes, 70 yards, 1 TD |
| Harding | Receiving | Christian Franklin | 2 receptions, 38 yards, 1 TD |
| Ferris State | Passing | Wyatt Bower | 10/16, 177 yards, 2 TD |
| Ferris State | Rushing | Chase Carter | 7 rushes, 111 yards, 1 TD |
| Ferris State | Receiving | Cam Underwood | 4 receptions, 50 yards, 1 TD |
