= Paul Simmons (American football) =

American football coach (born 1972)

Current position
- Title: General manager
- Team: Harding
- Conference: GAC

Biographical details
- Born: September 5, 1972 (age 54); Ashdown, Arkansas, U.S.

Playing career
- 1991–1994: Harding
- Positions: Linebacker, defensive end

Coaching career (HC unless noted)
- 1996: Harding Academy (TN) (DC)
- 1997: Harding (GA)
- 1998–2005: Harding Academy (TN)
- 2006–2009: Harding (DL)
- 2010–2016: Harding (DC/DL)
- 2017–2025: Harding

Administrative career (AD unless noted)
- 2026–present: Harding (GM)

Head coaching record
- Overall: 92–16 (college); 51–38–1 (high school)
- Tournaments: 14–6 (NCAA D-II playoffs)

Accomplishments and honors

Championships
- 1 NCAA Division II (2023); 4 GAC (2021, 2023-2025)

Paul Simmons is an American college football coach and general manager. He is the football program general manager for Harding University in Searcy, Arkansas, a position he was promoted to in January 2026. As head coach, he won Great American Conference championships in 2021, 2023, 2024, 2025, reached the semifinals of the NCAA Division II Football Championship playoffs in 2017, and won the NCAA Division II national championship in 2023. In 2025, Simmons' Bisons advanced to the national championship game a second time, losing to Ferris State.

As a player for Harding, Simmons was a three-time first-team All-American linebacker and defensive end. He was inducted into the Harding Athletics Hall of Fame in 1999. Simmons played high school football for the Ashdown High School Panthers in Ashdown, Arkansas from 1988 to 1990.

Simmons joined Harding as an assistant coach in 2006, and became the defensive coordinator in 2010. Before coming to Harding, Simmons was a high school head coach in Memphis.

In 2023, Simmons coached his Harding Bisons to an NCAA Division II national championship, finishing undefeated at 15–0. That team became the first to ever rush for over 6,000 yards in a single season in NCAA history.

Simmons' son Wyatt, a three-star linebacker from the 2024 class at Harding Academy in Searcy, plays college football for the Arkansas Razorbacks.

After leading Harding to the national championship game for a second time in 2025, losing 21-42 to Ferris State and finishing number two in the nation, Simmons was promoted to a new position as general manager of the Harding Bisons.

== Head coaching record ==
=== College ===
| Year | Team | Overall | Conference | Standing | Bowl/playoffs | AFCA^{#} | D2^{°} |
|---|---|---|---|---|---|---|---|
Harding Bisons (Great American Conference) (2017–2025)
| 2017 | Harding | 11–4 | 8–3 | T–2nd | L NCAA Division II Semifinal | 6 | |
| 2018 | Harding | 9–3 | 9–2 | 2nd | L NCAA Division II First Round | 20 | |
| 2019 | Harding | 10–2 | 10–1 | 2nd | L NCAA Division II First Round | 15 | |
| 2020 | No team—COVID-19 | | | | | | |
| 2021 | Harding | 11–2 | 10–1 | 1st | L NCAA Division II Second Round | 10 | |
| 2022 | Harding | 9–2 | 9–2 | 2nd | | 22 | |
| 2023 | Harding | 15–0 | 11–0 | 1st | W NCAA Division II Championship | 1 | 1 |
| 2024 | Harding | 12–2 | 10–1 | T–1st | L NCAA Division II Quarterfinal | 4 | 4 |
| 2025 | Harding | 15–1 | 11–0 | 1st | L NCAA Division II Championship | 2 | 2 |
| Harding: | | 92–16 | 78–10 | | | | |
| Total: | | 92–16 | | | | | |
National championship Conference title Conference division title or championship game berth
^{#}NCAA Division II AFCA poll.

=== High school ===
| Year | Team | Overall | Conference | Standing | Bowl/playoffs |
|---|---|---|---|---|---|
Harding Academy Lions () (1998–2005)
| 1998 | Harding Academy | 5–6 | 3–2 | | |
| 1999 | Harding Academy | 6–4 | 3–4 | | |
| 2000 | Harding Academy | 9–3 | 5–2 | | |
| 2001 | Harding Academy | 8–4 | 2–1 | | |
| 2002 | Harding Academy | 7–4–1 | 1–2 | | |
| 2003 | Harding Academy | 5–6 | 1–2 | | |
| 2004 | Harding Academy | 5–6 | 1–2 | 6th | |
| 2005 | Harding Academy | 6–5 | 3–3 | 4th | |
| Harding Academy: | | 51–38–1 | 19–18 | | |
| Total: | | 51–38–1 | | | |
