= List of Valdosta State Blazers football seasons =

The Valdosta State Blazers represent the Valdosta State University in football. The Blazers are a member of the Gulf South Conference (GSC) in NCAA Division II. Valdosta State University has had a football team since 1981. Valdosta State has competed in seven NCAA Division II National Football Championships and won four (2004, 2007, 2012, 2018), with losses in 2002, 2021, and 2024. The Blazers have also compiled 11 GSC Championships (1996, 2000, 2001, 2002, 2004, 2010, 2018, 2019, 2021, 2023, 2024).

== Seasons ==
National champions †	Conference champions *

Season	Head coach	Conference	Season			Playoff result
Season	Head coach	Conference	Season Record	Conference record	Conference Finish	Playoff result
Valdosta State Blazers
1982	Jim Goodman	Gulf South Conference	5–5–1	2–4	6th	
1983	Jim Goodman	Gulf South Conference	5–6	2–5	8th	
1984	Jim Goodman	Gulf South Conference	5–6	3–5	6th	
1985	Jim Berryman	Gulf South Conference	5–6	3–5	6th	
1986	Mike Cavan	Gulf South Conference	9–2	7–1	2nd	
1987	Mike Cavan	Gulf South Conference	6–4	4–4	4th	
1988	Mike Cavan	Gulf South Conference	6–3–1	4–3–1	4th	
1989	Mike Cavan	Gulf South Conference	5–5	5–3	3rd	
1990	Mike Cavan	Gulf South Conference	5–5	5–3	4th	
1991	Mike Cavan	Gulf South Conference	6–3–1	4–1–1	2nd	
1992	Hal Mumme	Gulf South Conference	5–4–1	3–2–1	4th	
1993	Hal Mumme	Gulf South Conference	8–3	5–2	2nd	
1994	Hal Mumme	Gulf South Conference	11–2	6–1	2nd	Loss NCAA Division II Quarterfinal against North Alabama, 24–27 ^{(OT)}
1995	Hal Mumme	Gulf South Conference	6–5	4–3	5th	
1996 *	Hal Mumme	Gulf South Conference	10–3	6–2	1st *	Loss NCAA Division II Quarterfinal against Carson–Newman, 19–24
1997	Mike Kelly	Gulf South Conference	6–5	5–3	T–4th	
1998	Mike Kelly	Gulf South Conference	5–6	4–5	5th	
1999	Mike Kelly / Mark Nelson	Gulf South Conference	4–7	3–6	6th	
2000 *	Chris Hatcher	Gulf South Conference	10–2	8–1	1st *	Loss NCAA Division II First Round against Delta State, 24–31
2001 *	Chris Hatcher	Gulf South Conference	12–1	9–0	1st *	Loss NCAA Division II Quarterfinal against Catawba, 34–37 ^{(OT)}
2002 *	Chris Hatcher	Gulf South Conference	14–1	9–0	1st *	Loss NCAA Division II Championship against Grand Valley State, 24–31
2003	Chris Hatcher	Gulf South Conference	10–2	8–1	2nd	Loss NCAA Division II First Round against Carson–Newman, 29–35
2004 †*	Chris Hatcher	Gulf South Conference	13–1	9–0	1st *	Won NCAA Division II Championship against Pittsburg State, 36–31
2005	Chris Hatcher	Gulf South Conference	9–3	7–2	T–2nd	Loss NCAA Division II First Round against North Alabama, 13–40
2006	Chris Hatcher	Gulf South Conference	8–2	6–2	T–3rd	
2007 †	David Dean	Gulf South Conference	13–1	7–1	T–2nd	Won NCAA Division II Championship against Northwest Missouri State, 25–20
2008	David Dean	Gulf South Conference	9–3	6–2	3rd	Loss NCAA Division II Second Round against North Alabama, 10–37
2009	David Dean	Gulf South Conference	6–4	5–3	3rd	
2010 *	David Dean	Gulf South Conference	8–3	6–2	T–1st *	Loss NCAA Division II First Round against North Alabama, 20–43
2011	David Dean	Gulf South Conference	6–4	1–3	5th	
2012 †	David Dean	Gulf South Conference	12–2	4–1	2nd	Won NCAA Division II Championship against Winston–Salem State, 35–7
2013	David Dean	Gulf South Conference	6–4	3–2	5th	
2014	David Dean	Gulf South Conference	10–3	5–2	4th	Loss NCAA Division II Quarterfinal against West Georgia, 17–31
2015	David Dean	Gulf South Conference	9–3	5–2	3rd	Loss NCAA Division II Second Round against West Georgia, 20–27
2016	Kerwin Bell	Gulf South Conference	8–3	6–2	2nd	Loss NCAA Division II First Round against UNC Pembroke, 21–24
2017	Kerwin Bell	Gulf South Conference	5-4	5–3	5th	
2018 †*	Kerwin Bell	Gulf South Conference	14–0	8–0	1st *	Won NCAA Division II Championship against Ferris State, 49–47
2019 *	Gary Goff	Gulf South Conference	10–1	8–0	1st *	Loss NCAA Division II Second Round against West Florida, 35–38
2020	Gary Goff	Gulf South Conference	–	–	–	Season suspended due to COVID-19
2021 *	Gary Goff	Gulf South Conference	12–2	6–1	T–1st *	Loss NCAA Division II Championship against Ferris State, 17–58
2022	Tremaine Jackson	Gulf South Conference	4–5	2–4	6th	
2023 *	Tremaine Jackson	Gulf South Conference	12–2	7–1	T–1st *	Loss NCAA Division II Quarterfinal against Lenoir–Rhyne, 7–35
2024 *	Tremaine Jackson	Gulf South Conference	13–1	6–0	1st *	Loss NCAA Division II Championship against Ferris State, 14–49
2025 *	Graham Craig	Gulf South Conference	6–5	2–1	T–1st *	Loss NCAA Division II First Round against Albany State, 30–35
Totals	12 coaches		352–143–4	223–95–3	12 Conference Championships	4 National Championships

== Sources ==
2012 Blazer Record Book
Blazer Football Season Results
