= 2024 Harding Bisons football team =

American college football season

2024 Harding Bisons football

GAC co-champion

NCAA Division II Quarterfinal, L 7–41 vs. Ferris State
- Conference: Great American Conference

Ranking
- AFCA: No. 4
- Record: 12–2 (10–1 GAC)
- Head coach: Paul Simmons (8th season)
- Offensive scheme: Flexbone triple option
- Defensive coordinator: Roddy Mote (8th season)
- Co-defensive coordinator: Luke Tribble (8th season)
- Base defense: 3–4
- Home stadium: First Security Stadium

2024 Great American Conference football standings
	Conf.			Overall
Team	W		L	W		L
No. 4 Harding +^	10	–	1	12	–	2
No. 14 Ouachita Baptist +^	10	–	1	10	–	2
Southern Arkansas	9	–	2	9	–	2
Henderson State	8	–	3	8	–	3
Arkansas Tech	5	–	6	5	–	6
East Central	5	–	6	5	–	6
SE Oklahoma State	5	–	6	5	–	6
Arkansas–Monticello	4	–	7	4	–	7
Southern Nazarene	3	–	8	3	–	8
SW Oklahoma State	3	–	8	3	–	8
NW Oklahoma State	2	–	9	2	–	9
Oklahoma Baptist	2	–	9	2	–	9
+ – Conference co-champions; ^ – NCAA Division II playoff participant; Rankings from AFCA poll

The 2024 Harding Bisons football team represented Harding University in the 2024 NCAA Division II football season as a member of the Great American Conference (GAC). The Bisons were led by eighth-year head coach Paul Simmons and played their home games at First Security Stadium in Searcy, Arkansas.

The team entered the 2024 season as both the reigning GAC champion and the defending NCAA Division II national champion.

== Preseason ==
The GAC coaches preseason poll was released on August 1, 2024. The Bisons were predicted to finish first in the conference, receiving 10 of the 12 first place votes, while Ouachita Baptist and Southern Arkansas each received one first place vote.

== Schedule ==
Date	Time	Opponent	Rank	Site	Result	Attendance	Source
September 5	7:00 p.m.	Southern Nazarene	No. 1	First Security Stadium; Searcy, AR	W 59–0	3,500	
September 14	7:00 p.m.	at Oklahoma Baptist	No. 1	Crain Family Stadium; Shawnee, OK	W 59–7	2,706	
September 19	6:00 p.m.	at Arkansas–Monticello	No. 1	Cotton Boll Stadium; Monticello, AR	W 63–3	2,100	
September 28	7:00 p.m.	No. 20 Henderson State	No. 1	First Security Stadium; Searcy, AR	W 66–0	5,200	
October 5	2:00 p.m.	at Southwestern Oklahoma State	No. 1	Milam Stadium; Weatherford, OK	W 57–3	905	
October 12	2:00 p.m.	Northwestern Oklahoma State	No. 1	First Security Stadium; Searcy, AR	W 62–0	2,100	
October 19	7:00 p.m.	at No. 9 Ouachita Baptist	No. 1	Cliff Harris Stadium; Arkadelphia, AR	L 13–17	7,322	
October 26	3:00 p.m.	No. 22 Southern Arkansas^{†}	No. 7	First Security Stadium; Searcy, AR	W 49–17	5,400	
October 31	7:00 p.m.	Southeastern Oklahoma State	No. 6	First Security Stadium; Searcy, AR	W 56–14	1,900	
November 9	2:00 p.m.	at East Central	No. 4	Koi Ishto Stadium; Ada, OK	W 34–7	1,907	
November 16	2:00 p.m.	Arkansas Tech	No. 4	First Security Stadium; Searcy, AR	W 57–27	2,100	
November 23	1:00 p.m.	at No. 13 Pittsburg State*	No. 4	Carnie Smith Stadium; Pittsburg, KS (NCAA Division II first round)	W 48–3	4,894	
November 30	12:00 p.m.	at No. 5 Grand Valley State*	No. 4	Lubbers Stadium; Allendale, MI (NCAA Division II second round)	W 44–26	2,844	
December 7	12:00 p.m.	at No. 2 Ferris State*	No. 4	Top Taggart Field; Big Rapids, MI (NCAA Division II quarterfinal)	L 7–41	4,120	
*Non-conference game; ^{†}Homecoming; Rankings from AFCA Poll released prior to the game; All times are in Central time

== Rankings ==
Ranking movements Legend: ██ Increase in ranking ██ Decrease in ranking ( ) = First-place votes
	Week													
Poll	Pre	1	2	3	4	5	6	7	8	9	10	11	12	Final
AFCA	1 (25)	1 (25)*	1 (27)	1 (27)	1 (29)	1 (29)	1 (30)	1 (30)	7	6	4	4	4	4
D2 Football	1	1	1	1	1	1	1	1	8	7	5	5	5	4

* A new poll was not released for this week, so for comparison purposes, the previous week's ranking is inserted in this week's slot.

== Game summaries ==
=== Southern Nazarene ===
Southern Nazarene Crimson Storm at No. 1 Harding Bisons – Game summary

Quarter	1	2	3	4	Total
Crimson Storm	0	0	0	0	0
No. 1 Bisons	14	28	10	7	59

at First Security Stadium, Searcy, Arkansas

- Date: September 5
- Game time: 7:00 p.m. CDT
- Game weather: Sunny, 82 °F (28 °C)
- Game attendance: 3,500
- Referee: Michael Catton
- Box score, Recap

Game information
First quarter
- HAR – Blake Delacruz 5-yard run (Magnus Lepak kick), 13:57. Bisons 7–0. Drive: 1 play, 5 yards, 0:05.
- HAR – Cole Keylon 9-yard run (Magnuz Lepak kick), 10:16. Bisons 14–0. Drive: 8 plays, 73 yards, 2:10.

Second quarter

- HAR – Cole Keylon 1-yard run (Magnus Lepak kick), 13:44. Bisons 21–0. Drive: 3 plays, 35 yards, 1:16.
- HAR – Blake Delacruz 15-yard run (Magnus Lepak kick), 8:43. Bisons 28–0. Drive: 8 plays, 56 yards, 3:54.
- HAR – Braden Jay 21-yard pass from Cole Keylon (Magnus Lepak kick), 7:20. Bisons 35–0. Drive: 2 plays, 23 yards, 0:47.
- HAR – Andrew Miller 88-yard run (Magnus Lepak kick), 4:48. Bisons 42–0. Drive: 1 play, 88 yards, 0:14.

Third quarter

- HAR – Josh Evans-Pickens 21-yard run (Magnus Lepak kick), 11:35. Bisons 49–0. Drive: 6 plays, 64 yards, 3:25.
- HAR – Magnus Lepak 33-yard field goal, 1:34. Bisons 52–0. Drive: 6 plays, 28 yards, 3:52.

Fourth quarter

- HAR – Malik Young 20-yard run (Magnus Lepak kick), 12:18. Bisons 59–0. Drive: 5 plays, 46 yards, 2:32.

Statistics	SNU	HAR
First downs	4	24
Total yards	49	607
Rushing yards	33	554
Passing yards	16	53
Turnovers	1	3
Time of possession	25:38	34:22

Team	Category	Player	Statistics
Southern Nazarene	Passing	Rasheed Noel	2/5, 17 yards
Southern Nazarene	Rushing	Evan Rader	1 rush, 37 yards
Southern Nazarene	Receiving	Dalen Smith	1 reception, 9 yards
Harding	Passing	Cole Keylon	2/5, 53 yards, TD
Harding	Rushing	Andrew Miller	6 rushes, 129 yards, TD
Harding	Receiving	Will White	1 reception, 32 yards

=== At Oklahoma Baptist ===
No. 1 Harding Bisons at Oklahoma Baptist Bison – Game summary

Quarter	1	2	3	4	Total
No. 1 HAR Bisons	14	17	21	7	59
OKB Bison	0	7	0	0	7

at Crain Family Stadium, Shawnee, Oklahoma

- Date: September 14
- Game time: 7:00 p.m. CDT
- Game weather: Sunny, 88 °F (31 °C)
- Game attendance: 2,706
- Referee: Darin Lair
- Box score, Recap

Game information
First quarter
- HAR – Blake Delacruz 1-yard run (Magnus Lepak kick), 9:52. Harding 7–0. Drive: 8 plays, 30 yards, 4:13.
- HAR – Stone Sheffield 34-yard pass from Cole Keylon (Magnus Lepak kick), 6:15. Harding 14–0. Drive: 5 plays, 78 yards, 2:39.

Second quarter

- HAR – Blake Delacruz 3-yard run (Magnus Lepak kick), 11:44. Harding 21–0. Drive: 11 plays, 54 yards, 5:30.
- OKB – Haven Lysell-Stewart 5-yard pass from Kenny Rosenthal (Patrick Maxwell kick), 8:49. Harding 21–7. Drive: 9 plays, 65 yards, 2:55.
- HAR – Braden Jay 11-yard run (Magnus Lepak kick), 2:43. Harding 28–7. Drive: 10 plays, 59 yards, 5:59.
- HAR – Magnus Lepak 36-yard field goal, 0:10. Harding 31–7. Drive: 10 plays, 46 yards, 1:58.

Third quarter

- HAR – Andrew Miller 8-yard run (Magnus Lepak kick), 10:33. Harding 38–7. Drive: 9 plays, 74 yards, 4:22.
- HAR – Malik Young 1-yard run (Magnus Lepak kick), 5:06. Harding 45–7. Drive: 8 plays, 63 yards, 4:20.
- HAR – Josh Strickland Jr. 3-yard run (Magnus Lepak kick), 0:49. Harding 52–7. Drive: 6 plays, 64 yards, 3:09.

Fourth quarter

- HAR – G'Kyson Wright 15-yard interception return (Magnus Lepak kick), 12:26. Harding 59–7.

Statistics	HAR	OKB
First downs	31	8
Total yards	506	157
Rushing yards	427	27
Passing yards	79	130
Turnovers	1	2
Time of possession	42:24	17:36

Team	Category	Player	Statistics
Harding	Passing	Cole Keylon	4/6, 60 yards, TD
Harding	Rushing	Blake Delacruz	14 rushes, 68 yards, 2 TD
Harding	Receiving	Stone Sheffield	2 receptions, 53 yards, TD
Oklahoma Baptist	Passing	Kenny Rosenthal	12/33, 110 yards, TD, 2 INT
Oklahoma Baptist	Rushing	Caden Peevy	2 rushes, 19 yards
Oklahoma Baptist	Receiving	Michael Marshall	4 receptions, 33 yards

=== At Arkansas–Monticello ===
No. 1 Harding Bisons at Arkansas–Monticello Boll Weevils – Game summary

Quarter	1	2	3	4	Total
No. 1 Bisons	35	7	14	7	63
Boll Weevils	0	0	3	0	3

at Cotton Boll Stadium, Monticello, Arkansas

- Date: September 19
- Game time: 6:00 p.m. CDT
- Game weather: Sunny
- Game attendance: 2,100
- Referee: Brad Frisby
- Box score, Recap

Game information
First quarter
- HAR – Braden Jay 37-yard run (Magnus Lepak kick), 8:36. Bisons 7–0. Drive: 6 plays, 65 yards, 3:25.
- HAR – Blake Delacruz 33-yard run (Magnus Lepak kick), 6:56. Bisons 14–0. Drive: 2 plays, 39 yards, 0:52.
- HAR – Ty Dugger 43-yard interception return (Magnus Lepak kick), 5:39. Bisons 21–0.
- HAR – Braden Jay 70-yard pass from Cole Keylon (Magnus Lepak kick), 3:36. Bisons 28–0. Drive: 1 play, 70 yards, 0:17.
- HAR – Dane Romberger 53-yard pass from Cole Keylon (Magnus Lepak kick), 0:27. Bisons 35–0. Drive: 2 plays, 79 yards, 0:39.

Second quarter

- HAR – Andrew Miller 1-yard run (Magnus Lepak kick), 5:52. Bisons 42–0. Drive: 11 plays, 70 yards, 6:51.

Third quarter

- UAM – Dylan Duhon 22-yard field goal, 6:36. Bisons 42–3. Drive: 4 plays, 0 yards, 1:20.
- HAR – Andrew Miller 69-yard run (Magnus Lepak kick), 5:10. Bisons 49–3. Drive: 3 plays, 74 yards, 1:26.
- HAR – Josh Strickland Jr. 27-yard run (Magnus Lepak kick), 0:15. Bisons 56–3. Drive: 5 plays, 70 yards, 3:03.

Fourth quarter

- HAR – Jimmy Citty 4-yard run (Magnus Lepak kick), 4:14. Bisons 63–3. Drive: 11 plays, 80 yards, 7:36.

Statistics	HAR	UAM
First downs	23	9
Total yards	578	191
Rushing yards	433	104
Passing yards	145	87
Turnovers	1	3
Time of possession	32:42	27:09

Team	Category	Player	Statistics
Harding	Passing	Cole Keylon	3/4, 145 yards, 2 TD
Harding	Rushing	Andrew Miller	6 rushes, 78 yards, 2 TD
Harding	Receiving	Braden Jay	1 reception, 70 yards, TD
Arkansas–Monticello	Passing	Demilon Brown	9/20, 79 yards, 3 INT
Arkansas–Monticello	Rushing	Tyler Reed	17 rushes, 73 yards
Arkansas–Monticello	Receiving	Isaiah Cross	3 receptions, 32 yards

=== No. 20 Henderson State ===
No. 20 Henderson State Reddies at No. 1 Harding Bisons – Game summary

Quarter	1	2	3	4	Total
No. 20 Reddies	0	0	0	0	0
No. 1 Bisons	28	21	10	7	66

at First Security Stadium, Searcy, Arkansas

- Date: September 28
- Game time: 7:00 p.m. CDT
- Game weather: Cloudy, 73 °F (23 °C)
- Game attendance: 5,200
- Referee: Jimmy Malone
- Box score, Recap

Game information
First quarter
- HAR – Braden Jay 69-yard run (Magnus Lepak kick), 13:50. Bisons 7–0. Drive: 1 play, 69 yards, 0:12.
- HAR – Blake Delacruz 2-yard run (Magnus Lepak kick), 11:46. Bisons 14–0. Drive: 4 plays, 20 yards, 1:56.
- HAR – Blake Delacruz 2-yard run (Magnus Lepak kick), 4:09. Bisons 21–0. Drive: 9 plays, 38 yards, 5:27.
- HAR – Braden Jay 44-yard run (Magnus Lepak kick), 0:02. Bisons 28–0. Drive: 4 plays, 72 yards, 2:00.

Second quarter

- HAR – Blake Delacruz 1-yard run (Magnus Lepak kick), 10:23. Bisons 35–0. Drive: 4 plays, 42 yards, 2:40.
- HAR – Braden Jay 35-yard run (Magnus Lepak kick), 4:59. Bisons 42–0. Drive: 8 plays, 93 yards, 4:47.
- HAR – Blake Delacruz 3-yard run (Magnus Lepak kick), 0:45. Bisons 49–0. Drive: 3 plays, 80 yards, 0:55.

Third quarter

- HAR – Magnus Lepak 23-yard field goal, 7:52. Bisons 52–0. Drive: 10 plays, 71 yards, 7:00.
- HAR – Malik Young 3-yard run (Magnus Lepak kick), 6:02. Bisons 59–0. Drive: 3 plays, 16 yards, 1:30.

Fourth quarter

- HAR – Andrew Miller 14-yard run (Magnus Lepak kick), 6:06. Bisons 66–0. Drive: 5 plays, 58 yards, 3:20.

Statistics	HSU	HAR
First downs	4	25
Total yards	153	618
Rushing yards	28	546
Passing yards	125	72
Turnovers	3	0
Time of possession	18:49	41:11

Team	Category	Player	Statistics
Henderson State	Passing	Andrew Edwards	7/19, 125 yards, 2 INT
Henderson State	Rushing	Andrew Edwards	4 rushes, 11 yards
Henderson State	Receiving	Jalen Abraham	2 receptions, 59 yards
Harding	Passing	Cole Keylon	1/1, 41 yards
Harding	Rushing	Braden Jay	4 rushes, 162 yards, 3 TD
Harding	Receiving	Will White	1 reception, 41 yards

=== At SW Oklahoma State ===
No. 1 Harding Bisons at Southwestern Oklahoma State Bulldogs – Game summary

Quarter	1	2	3	4	Total
No. 1 Bisons	19	17	7	14	57
Bulldogs	0	3	0	0	3

at Milam Stadium, Weatherford, Oklahoma

- Date: October 5
- Game time: 2:00 p.m. CDT
- Game weather: Sunny
- Game attendance: 905
- Referee: Allen Tatum
- Box score, Recap

Game information
- HAR – Cole Keylon 4-yard run (kick failed), 9:54. Bisons 6–0. Drive: 9 plays, 51 yards, 4:59.
- HAR – Jordan Mays 0-yard blocked punt return (Magnus Lepak kick), 7:37. Bisons 13–0.
- HAR – Darius Brown 53-yard pass from Cole Keylon (kick failed), 0:08. Bisons 19–0. Drive: 5 plays, 96 yards, 2:50.

Second quarter

- HAR – Cole Keylon 26-yard run (Magnus Lepak kick), 10:33. Bisons 26–0. Drive: 4 plays, 65 yards, 2:24.
- SWO – Ethan McBee 24-yard field goal, 5:31. Bisons 26–3. Drive: 10 plays, 37 yards, 5:01.
- HAR – Braden Jay 54-yard pass from Cole Keylon (Magnus Lepak kick), 4:00. Bisons 33–3. Drive: 3 plays, 56 yards, 1:24.
- HAR – Magnus Lepak 28-yard field goal, 0:00. Bisons 36–3. Drive: 10 plays, 46 yards, 2:22.

Third quarter

- HAR – Jhalen Spicer 14-yard pass from Cole Keylon (Magnus Lepak kick), 8:36. Bisons 43–3. Drive: 6 plays, 43 yards, 3:19.

Fourth quarter

- HAR – Andrew Miller 7-yard run (Magnus Lepak kick), 12:22. Bisons 50–3. Drive: 8 plays, 58 yards, 3:54.
- HAR – Kyler Finney 4-yard run (Magnus Lepak kick), 5:38. Bisons 57–3. Drive: 2 plays, 66 yards, 0:50.

Statistics	HAR	SWO
First downs	25	5
Total yards	523	95
Rushing yards	393	73
Passing yards	130	22
Turnovers	1	2
Time of possession	33:00	27:00

Team	Category	Player	Statistics
Harding	Passing	Cole Keylon	4/5, 130 yards, 3 TD
Harding	Rushing	Kyler Finney	8 rushes, 87 yards, TD
Harding	Receiving	Braden Jay	1 reception, 54 yards, TD
SW Oklahoma State	Passing	Kai Kunz	7/15, 22 yards
SW Oklahoma State	Rushing	Kai Kunz	12 rushes, 60 yards
SW Oklahoma State	Receiving	Michael Arceneaux II	5 receptions, 8 yards

=== NW Oklahoma State ===
Northwestern Oklahoma State Rangers at No. 1 Harding Bisons – Game summary

Quarter	1	2	3	4	Total
Rangers	0	0	0	0	0
No. 1 Bisons	21	14	6	21	62

at First Security Stadium, Searcy, Arkansas

- Date: October 12
- Game time: 2:00 p.m. CDT
- Game weather: Sunny, 86 °F (30 °C)
- Game attendance: 2,100
- Referee: Dewayne Barbee
- Box score, Recap

Game information
First quarter
- HAR – Blake Delacruz 1-yard run (Magnus Lepak kick), 12:31. Bisons 7–0. Drive: 5 plays, 70 yards, 2:29.
- HAR – Blake Delacruz 10-yard pass from Cole Keylon (Magnus Lepak kick), 6:52. Bisons 14–0. Drive: 8 plays, 65 yards, 4:00.
- HAR – Ty Dugger 83-yard interception return (Magnus Lepak kick), 1:31. Bisons 21–0.

Second quarter

- HAR – Braden Jay 31-yard run (Magnus Lepak kick), 8:52. Bisons 28–0. Drive: 7 plays, 70 yards, 4:23.
- HAR – Chauncey Martin 20-yard pass from Kyler Finney (Magnus Lepak kick), 2:16. Bisons 35–0. Drive: 9 plays, 70 yards, 5:09.

Third quarter

- HAR – Kyler Finney 5-yard run (kick failed), 1:20. Bisons 41–0. Drive: 10 plays, 69 yards, 6:02.

Fourth quarter

- HAR – Josh Strickland Jr. 6-yard run (James Satterfield kick), 11:27. Bisons 48–0. Drive: 7 plays, 71 yards, 3:13.
- HAR – Kyle Henry 28-yard interception return (James Satterfield kick), 11:18. Bisons 55–0.
- HAR – Christian Franklin 5-yard run (James Satterfield kick), 6:51. Bisons 62–0. Drive: 4 plays, 47 yards, 2:03.

Statistics	NWO	HAR
First downs	4	28
Total yards	32	502
Rushing yards	24	418
Passing yards	8	84
Turnovers	2	0
Time of possession	25:31	34:29

Team	Category	Player	Statistics
NW Oklahoma State	Passing	Brodey Johnson	5/11, 9 yards, INT
NW Oklahoma State	Rushing	Darien Gill	11 rushes, 46 yards
NW Oklahoma State	Receiving	Travis Romar	3 receptions, 13 yards
Harding	Passing	Cole Keylon	2/3, 64 yards, TD
Harding	Rushing	Andrew Miller	11 rushes, 107 yards
Harding	Receiving	Braden Jay	1 reception, 54 yards

=== At No. 9 Ouachita Baptist ===
No. 1 Harding Bisons at No. 9 Ouachita Baptist Tigers – Game summary

Quarter	1	2	3	4	Total
No. 1 Bisons	7	6	0	0	13
No. 9 Tigers	7	3	0	7	17

at Cliff Harris Stadium, Arkadelphia, Arkansas

- Date: October 19
- Game time: 7:00 p.m. CDT
- Game weather: Clear, 64 °F (18 °C)
- Game attendance: 7,322
- Referee: Brad Frisby
- Box score, Recap

Game information
First quarter
- HAR – Dane Romberger 13-yard pass from Braden Jay (Magnus Lepak kick), 9:30. Bisons 7–0. Drive: 7 plays, 69 yards, 4:16.
- OUA – Kendel Givens 3-yard run (Dax Jaggers kick), 3:42. Tied 7–7. Drive: 10 plays, 69 yards, 5:48.

Second quarter

- HAR – Magnus Lepak 52-yard field goal, 9:55. Bisons 10–7. Drive: 10 plays, 44 yards, 5:35.
- OUA – Dax Jaggers 25-yard field goal, 5:44. Tied 10–10. Drive: 9 plays, 61 yards, 4:11.
- HAR – Magnus Lepak 42-yard field goal, 0:24. Bisons 13–10. Drive: 11 plays, 72 yards, 4:08.

Third quarter

- No scoring plays

Fourth quarter

- OUA – Eli Livingston 4-yard pass from Connor Flannigan (Dax Jaggers kick), 12:58. Tigers 17–13. Drive: 6 plays, 48 yards, 2:42.

Statistics	HAR	OUA
First downs	15	12
Total yards	288	198
Rushing yards	218	85
Passing yards	70	113
Turnovers	2	1
Time of possession	33:02	26:58

Team	Category	Player	Statistics
Harding	Passing	Cole Keylon	5/12, 57 yards
Harding	Rushing	Cole Keylon	14 rushes, 78 yards
Harding	Receiving	Darius Brown	3 receptions, 38 yards
Ouachita Baptist	Passing	Eli Livingston	10/18, 109 yards, INT
Ouachita Baptist	Rushing	Kendel Givens	13 rushes, 47 yards, TD
Ouachita Baptist	Receiving	Connor Flannigan	5 receptions, 62 yards

=== No. 22 Southern Arkansas ===
No. 22 Southern Arkansas Muleriders at No. 7 Harding Bisons – Game summary

Quarter	1	2	3	4	Total
No. 22 Muleriders	3	0	7	7	17
No. 7 Bisons	14	21	7	7	49

at First Security Stadium, Searcy, Arkansas

- Date: October 26
- Game time: 3:00 p.m. CDT
- Game weather: Cloudy, 71 °F (22 °C)
- Game attendance: 5,400
- Referee: Jimmy Malone
- Box score, Recap

Game information
First quarter
- HAR – Chauncey Martin 11-yard run (Magnus Lepak kick), 9:02. Bisons 7–0. Drive: 11 plays, 58 yards, 5:50.
- SAU – Daniel Gauna 23-yard field goal, 6:28. Bisons 7–3. Drive: 8 plays, 75 yards, 2:25.
- HAR – Braden Jay 73-yard run (Magnus Lepak kick), 6:09. Bisons 14–3. Drive: 1 play, 73 yards, 0:13.

Second quarter

- HAR – Chauncey Martin 47-yard run (Magnus Lepak kick), 14:49. Bisons 21–3. Drive: 6 plays, 97 yards, 3:09.
- HAR – Kendale Allen 0-yard fumble return (Magnus Lepak kick), 12:20. Bisons 28–3.
- HAR – Blake Delacruz 52-yard pass from Cole Keylon (Magnus Lepak kick), 6:47. Bisons 35–3. Drive: 3 plays, 52 yards, 1:28.

Third quarter

- SAU – Jariq Scales 1-yard run (Daniel Gauna kick), 11:21. Bisons 35–10. Drive: 13 plays, 75 yards, 3:39.
- HAR – Cole Keylon 4-yard run (Magnus Lepak kick), 0:12. Bisons 42–10. Drive: 7 plays, 61 yards, 4:01.

Fourth quarter

- HAR – Andrew Miller 23-yard run (Magnus Lepak kick), 8:33. Bisons 49–10. Drive: 1 play, 23 yards, 0:06.
- SAU – Seth Johnson 49-yard pass from Judd Barton (Daniel Gauna kick), 4:29. Bisons 49–17. Drive: 9 plays, 75 yards, 4:04.

Statistics	SAU	HAR
First downs	21	15
Total yards	417	423
Rushing yards	221	340
Passing yards	196	83
Turnovers	1	0
Time of possession	31:33	28:27

Team	Category	Player	Statistics
Southern Arkansas	Passing	Judd Barton	18/31, 196 yards, TD
Southern Arkansas	Rushing	Judd Barton	14 rushes, 87 yards
Southern Arkansas	Receiving	Seth Johnson	1 reception, 49 yards, TD
Harding	Passing	Cole Keylon	2/4, 83 yards, TD
Harding	Rushing	Braden Jay	7 rushes, 136 yards, TD
Harding	Receiving	Blake Delacruz	1 reception, 52 yards, TD

=== SE Oklahoma State ===
Southeastern Oklahoma State Savage Storm at No. 6 Harding Bisons – Game summary

Quarter	1	2	3	4	Total
Savage Storm	0	7	0	7	14
No. 6 Bisons	0	28	14	14	56

at First Security Stadium, Searcy, Arkansas

- Date: October 31
- Game time: 7:00 p.m. CDT
- Game weather: Cloudy, 67 °F (19 °C)
- Game attendance: 1,900
- Referee: Allen Tatum
- Box score, Recap

Game information
First quarter
- No scoring plays

Second quarter

- HAR – Andrew Miller 46-yard run (James Satterfield kick), 10:55. Bisons 7–0. Drive: 8 plays, 76 yards, 4:35.
- HAR – Braden Jay 13-yard run (James Satterfield kick), 8:54. Bisons 14–0. Drive: 4 plays, 24 yards, 1:53.
- SEO – Kobe Jennings 24-yard pass from Cergio Perez (Dylan Cox kick), 4:35. Bisons 14–7. Drive: 8 plays, 86 yards, 4:13.
- HAR – Braden Jay 61-yard run (James Satterfield kick), 2:39. Bisons 21–7. Drive: 4 plays, 75 yards, 1:56.
- HAR – Braden Jay 53-yard pass from Cole Keylon (James Satterfield kick), 1:16. Bisons 28–7. Drive: 1 play, 53 yards, 0:08.

Third quarter

- HAR – Blake Delacruz 43-yard run (James Satterfield kick), 11:09. Bisons 35–7. Drive: 5 plays, 73 yards, 2:31.
- HAR – Dane Romberger 1-yard run (James Satterfield kick), 3:22. Bisons 42–7. Drive: 8 plays, 56 yards, 4:22.

Fourth quarter

- SEO – D. J. Brown 2-yard run (Dylan Cox kick), 14:40. Bisons 42–14. Drive: 1 play, 2 yards, 0:04.
- HAR – Christian Franklin 6-yard run (James Satterfield kick), 11:31. Bisons 49–14. Drive: 6 plays, 58 yards, 3:07.
- HAR – Christian Franklin 57-yard run (James Satterfield kick), 7:11. Bisons 56–14. Drive: 2 plays, 62 yards, 0:49.

Statistics	SOU	HAR
First downs	13	19
Total yards	275	490
Rushing yards	151	415
Passing yards	124	75
Turnovers	4	1
Time of possession	29:16	30:44

Team	Category	Player	Statistics
SE Oklahoma State	Passing	Cergio Perez	7/24, 124 yards, TD, 3 INT
SE Oklahoma State	Rushing	D. J. Brown	21 rushes, 67 yards, TD
SE Oklahoma State	Receiving	Kobe Jennings	4 receptions, 67 yards, TD
Harding	Passing	Cole Keylon	2/4, 75 yards, TD
Harding	Rushing	Braden Jay	6 rushes, 108 yards, 2 TD
Harding	Receiving	Braden Jay	1 reception, 53 yards, TD

=== At East Central ===
No. 4 Harding Bisons at East Central Tigers – Game summary

Quarter	1	2	3	4	Total
No. 4 Bisons	7	13	7	7	34
Tigers	0	7	0	0	7

at Koi Ishto Stadium, Ada, Oklahoma

- Date: November 16
- Game time: 2:00 p.m. CST
- Game weather: Sunny
- Game attendance: 1,907
- Referee: Allen Tatum
- Box score, Recap

Game information
First quarter
- HAR – Braden Jay 21-yard run (James Satterfield kick), 10:54. Bisons 7–0. Drive: 5 plays, 60 yards, 2:31.

Second quarter

- HAR – James Satterfield 38-yard field goal, 12:14. Bisons 10–0. Drive: 11 plays, 44 yards, 4:16.
- HAR – Braden Jay 29-yard run (James Satterfield kick), 3:41. Bisons 17–0. Drive: 8 plays, 84 yards, 4:24.
- ECU – Tavare Smith Jr. 65-yard fumble return (Brandon Perez kick), 1:43. Bisons 17–7.
- HAR – James Satterfield 27-yard field goal, 0:07. Bisons 20–7. Drive: 7 plays, 65 yards, 1:36.

Third quarter

- HAR – Andrew Miller 29-yard run (James Satterfield kick), 10:58. Bisons 27–7. Drive: 8 plays, 64 yards, 3:54.

Fourth quarter

- HAR – Andrew Miller 2-yard run (James Satterfield kick), 2:21. Bisons 34–7. Drive: 11 plays, 97 yards, 6:07.

Statistics	HAR	ECU
First downs	26	8
Total yards	469	106
Rushing yards	435	52
Passing yards	34	54
Turnovers	1	0
Time of possession	33:41	26:19

Team	Category	Player	Statistics
Harding	Passing	Braden Jay	1/1, 34 yards
Harding	Rushing	Andrew Miller	16 rushes, 151 yards, 2 TD
Harding	Receiving	Darius Brown	1 reception, 34 yards
East Central	Passing	Sergio Kennedy	13/19, 54 yards
East Central	Rushing	Cade Searcy	10 rushes, 29 yards
East Central	Receiving	Bryce Bodkin	3 receptions, 28 yards

=== Arkansas Tech ===
Arkansas Tech Wonder Boys at No. 4 Harding Bisons – Game summary

Quarter	1	2	3	4	Total
Wonder Boys	0	7	7	13	27
No. 4 Bisons	23	20	14	0	57

at First Security Stadium, Searcy, Arkansas

- Date: November 16
- Game time: 2:00 p.m. CST
- Game weather: Sunny, 65 °F (18 °C)
- Game attendance: 2,100
- Referee: Darin Lair
- Box score, Recap

Game information
First quarter
- HAR – Braden Jay 55-yard run (James Satterfield kick), 14:41. Bisons 7–0. Drive: 1 play, 55 yards, 0:12.
- HAR – Kekoa Carroll 17-yard interception return (James Satterfield kick), 14:23. Bisons 14–0.
- HAR – Andrew Miller 6-yard run (James Satterfield kick), 5:01. Bisons 21–0. Drive: 14 plays, 75 yards, 7:57.
- HAR – Ethan Everson intentional grounding in own end zone, 4:15. Bisons 23–0.

Second quarter

- HAR – Blake Delacruz 1-yard run (James Satterfield kick), 12:40. Bisons 30–0. Drive: 12 plays, 79 yards, 6:35.
- HAR – Braden Jay 15-yard run (James Satterfield kick), 5:51. Bisons 37–0. Drive: 9 plays, 72 yards, 5:12.
- HAR – Christian Franklin 29-yard run (kick failed), 1:51. Bisons 43–0. Drive: 4 plays, 55 yards, 1:34.
- ATU – Ethan Everson 13-yard run (Christopher Baldazo kick), 0:16. Bisons 43–7. Drive: 8 plays, 73 yards, 1:30.

Third quarter

- HAR – Josh Evans-Pickens 5-yard run (James Satterfield kick), 8:12. Bisons 50–7. Drive: 7 plays, 52 yards, 4:07.
- ATU – Keshaun Lazard 20-yard pass from Ethan Everson (Christopher Baldazo kick), 2:16. Bisons 50–14. Drive: 12 plays, 75 yards, 5:56.
- HAR – Josh Jones 4-yard run (James Satterfield kick), 1:10. Bisons 57–14. Drive: 2 plays, 68 yards, 0:59.

Fourth quarter

- ATU – Dayton Keller 3-yard pass from Ethan Everson (Christopher Baldazo kick), 8:57. Bisons 57–21. Drive: 5 plays, 52 yards, 1:44.
- ATU – Dayton Keller 35-yard pass from Ethan Everson, 0:00. Bisons 57–27. Drive: 5 plays, 78 yards, 1:13.

Statistics	ATU	HAR
First downs	19	28
Total yards	312	520
Rushing yards	34	498
Passing yards	278	22
Turnovers	1	1
Time of possession	22:15	37:45

Team	Category	Player	Statistics
Arkansas Tech	Passing	Ethan Everson	17/35, 261 yards, 3 TD, INT
Arkansas Tech	Rushing	Deuce Wise	9 rushes, 13 yards
Arkansas Tech	Receiving	Jordan Jackson	6 receptions, 102 yards
Harding	Passing	Cole Keylon	2/3, 22 yards
Harding	Rushing	Braden Jay	7 rushes, 104 yards, 2 TD
Harding	Receiving	Andrew Miller	1 reception, 11 yards

=== At No. 13 Pittsburg State (NCAA Division II First Round) ===
NCAA Division II First Round
No. 4 Harding Bisons at No. 13 Pittsburg State Gorillas – Game summary

Quarter	1	2	3	4	Total
No. 4 Bisons	0	24	14	10	48
No. 13 Gorillas	3	0	0	0	3

at Carnie Smith Stadium, Pittsburg, Kansas

- Date: November 23
- Game time: 1:00 p.m. CST
- Game weather: Sunny, 60 °F (16 °C)
- Game attendance: 4,894
- Referee: Brad Mutnick
- TV: ESPN+
- Box score, Recap

Game information
First quarter
- PSU – Gentry Cole 47-yard field goal, 8:59. Gorillas 3–0. Drive: 9 plays, 38 yards, 4:01.

Second quarter

- HAR – Andrew Miller 2-yard run (James Satterfield kick), 12:15. Bisons 7–3. Drive: 12 plays, 85 yards, 6:38.
- HAR – Darius Brown 75-yard run (James Satterfield kick), 9:44. Bisons 14–3. Drive: 1 play, 75 yards, 0:11.
- HAR – Cole Keylon 3-yard run (James Satterfield kick), 5:59. Bisons 21–3. Drive: 4 plays, 18 yards, 1:46.
- HAR – James Satterfield 26-yard field goal, 0:00. Bisons 24–3. Drive: 13 plays, 64 yards, 2:01.

Third quarter

- HAR – Andrew Miller 1-yard run (James Satterfield kick), 9:31. Bisons 31–3. Drive: 6 plays, 59 yards, 3:37.
- HAR – Darius Brown 50-yard pass from Cole Keylon (James Satterfield kick), 4:24. Bisons 38–3. Drive: 6 plays, 73 yards, 3:50.

Fourth quarter

- HAR – James Satterfield 19-yard field goal, 14:19. Bisons 41–3. Drive: 7 plays, 34 yards, 3:59.
- HAR – Stone Sheffield 9-yard run (James Satterfield kick), 5:13. Bisons 48–3. Drive: 12 plays, 89 yards, 7:30.

Statistics	HAR	PSU
First downs	28	10
Total yards	585	148
Rushing yards	518	39
Passing yards	67	109
Turnovers	2	2
Time of possession	37:10	22:50

Team	Category	Player	Statistics
Harding	Passing	Cole Keylon	2/3, 50 yards, TD, INT
Harding	Rushing	Blake Delacruz	15 rushes, 89 yards
Harding	Receiving	Darius Brown	1 reception, 50 yards, TD
Pittsburg State	Passing	Chad Dodson Jr.	11/24, 104 yards, INT
Pittsburg State	Rushing	Noah Hernandez	12 rushes, 42 yards
Pittsburg State	Receiving	Jack Roberts	3 receptions, 65 yards

=== At No. 5 Grand Valley State (NCAA Division II Second Round) ===
NCAA Division II Second Round
No. 4 Harding Bisons at No. 5 Grand Valley State Lakers – Game summary

Quarter	1	2	3	4	Total
No. 4 Bisons	0	17	14	13	44
No. 5 Lakers	7	0	6	13	26

at Lubbers Stadium, Allendale, Michigan

- Date: November 30
- Game time: 12:00 p.m. CST/1:00 p.m. EST
- Game weather: Snow, 26 °F (−3 °C)
- Game attendance: 2,844
- Referee: Tristan Severson
- TV: ESPN+
- Box score, Recap

Game information
First quarter
- GVSU – Khalil Eichelberger 1-yard run (Mathew Bacik kick), 6:24. Lakers 7–0. Drive: 8 plays, 73 yards, 5:02.

Second quarter

- HAR – Chauncey Martin 6-yard run (James Satterfield kick), 14:14. Tied 7–7. Drive: 12 plays, 77 yards, 7:10.
- HAR – Andrew Miller 51-yard run (James Satterfield kick), 8:00. Bisons 14–7. Drive: 7 plays, 99 yards, 4:13.
- HAR – James Satterfield 20-yard field goal, 0:32. Bisons 17–7. Drive: 10 plays, 69 yards, 5:27.

Third quarter

- HAR – Andrew Miller 3-yard run (James Satterfield kick), 6:32. Bisons 24–7. Drive: 11 plays, 68 yards, 6:48.
- HAR – Blake Delacruz 2-yard run (James Satterfield kick), 0:08. Bisons 31–7. Drive: 9 plays, 56 yards, 5:18.
- GVSU – Kellen Reed 90-yard kickoff return (pass failed), 0:00. Bisons 31–13.

Fourth quarter

- HAR – Andrew Miller 42-yard run (kick failed), 13:28. Bisons 37–13. Drive: 3 plays, 72 yards, 1:25.
- GVSU – Ike Udengwu 2-yard run (pass failed), 7:57. Bisons 37–19. Drive: 13 plays, 62 yards, 5:25.
- HAR – Josh Strickland Jr. 10-yard run (James Satterfield kick), 4:07. Bisons 44–19. Drive: 6 plays, 52 yards, 3:50.
- GVSU – Syone Usma-Harper 4-yard run (Mathew Bacik kick), 1:11. Bisons 44–26. Drive: 6 plays, 70 yards, 2:49.

Statistics	HAR	GVSU
First downs	28	13
Total yards	475	223
Rushing yards	475	44
Passing yards	0	179
Turnovers	0	1
Time of possession	39:03	20:57

Team	Category	Player	Statistics
Harding	Passing	Cole Keylon	0/1, 0 yards
Harding	Rushing	Andrew Miller	15 rushes, 202 yards, 3 TD
Harding	Receiving	None	
Grand Valley State	Passing	Ike Udengwu	13/25, 179 yards
Grand Valley State	Rushing	Khalil Eichelberger	9 rushes, 36 yards, TD
Grand Valley State	Receiving	Syone Usma-Harper	3 receptions, 58 yards

=== At No. 2 Ferris State (NCAA Division II Quarter Final) ===
NCAA Division II Quarter Final
No. 4 Harding Bisons at No. 2 Ferris State Bulldogs – Game summary

Quarter	1	2	3	4	Total
No. 4 Bisons	0	0	0	7	7
No. 2 Bulldogs	13	7	14	7	41

at Top Taggart Field, Big Rapids, Michigan

- Date: December 7
- Game time: 12:00 p.m. CST/1:00 p.m. EST
- Game weather: Sunny, 38 °F (3 °C)
- Game attendance: 4,120
- Referee: Dwight Neibling
- TV: ESPN+
- Box score, Recap

Game information
First quarter
- FSU – Trinidad Chambliss 8-yard run (Mitchell Middleton kick), 10:33. Bulldogs 7–0. Drive: 6 plays, 55 yards, 2:30.
- FSU – James Gilbert 7-yard pass from Trinidad Chambliss (kick blocked), 0:16. Bulldogs 13–0. Drive: 13 plays, 64 yards, 5:59.

Second quarter

- FSU – Kannon Katzer 1-yard run (Mitchell Middleton kick), 0:15. Bulldogs 20–0. Drive: 5 plays, 26 yards, 2:08.

Third quarter

- FSU – Trinidad Chambliss 4-yard run (Mitchell Middleton kick), 9:22. Bulldogs 27–0. Drive: 12 plays, 75 yards, 5:38.
- FSU – James Gilbert 12-yard pass from Trinidad Chambliss (Mitchell Middleton kick), 0:51. Bulldogs 34–0. Drive: 11 plays, 69 yards, 6:54.

Fourth quarter

- FSU – Kannon Katzer 7-yard run (Mitchell Middleton kick), 11:48. Bulldogs 41–0. Drive: 2 plays, 79 yards, 0:59.
- HAR – Cole Keylon 11-yard run (James Satterfield kick), 6:20. Bulldogs 41–7. Drive: 10 plays, 80 yards, 5:23.

Statistics	HAR	FSU
First downs	11	24
Total yards	193	452
Rushing yards	130	287
Passing yards	63	165
Turnovers	2	0
Time of possession	28:13	31:47

Team	Category	Player	Statistics
Harding	Passing	Cole Keylon	5/7, 63 yards, INT
Harding	Rushing	Blake Delacruz	10 rushes, 43 yards
Harding	Receiving	Dane Romberger	2 receptions, 36 yards
Ferris State	Passing	Trinidad Chambliss	18/27, 145 yards, 2 TD
Ferris State	Rushing	Taariik Brett	3 rushes, 89 yards
Ferris State	Receiving	Brady Rose	7 receptions, 45 yards

== Personnel ==
2024 Harding Bisons football team roster
Players
Coaches
Offense

Pos.	#	Name	Class
RB	5	Stone Sheffield	Sr
RB	7	Braden Jay	Jr
RB	8	Andrew Miller	So
RB	10	Jhalen Spicer	Sr
QB	11	Kyler Finney	Fr
QB	13	Carter Zimmerman	Fr
WR	14	Will White	Sr
QB	15	Cole Keylon	Jr
QB	16	Malik Young	So
QB	17	Camren Cavalier	Fr
WR	18	Darius Brown	Jr
WR	19	Dane Romberger	Sr
RB	21	Chauncey Martin	Sr
RB	22	Will Fitzhugh	Sr
RB	25	Christian Franklin	Jr
RB	26	Blake Delacruz	Sr
RB	30	Josh Strickland Jr.	So
WR	31	Brady Barnett	Fr
RB	32	Sam Mitchum	Fr
RB	34	Josh Evans-Pickens	Fr
RB	35	Josh Jones	Sr
RB	37	Jimmy Citty	Sr
OL	50	Jose Lopez	So
OL	51	Vincent Cox	Fr
OL	54	Jake Mitchell	Jr
OL	56	Jonathan Underwood	Sr
OL	57	Jake Duggar	Sr
OL	59	Johnathan Vining	Fr
OL	60	Sam Ruffino	So
OL	62	Josh Lawrence	Fr
OL	63	David Gomez	So
OL	64	Jude Steffen	Jr
OL	65	Joshua Cobb	Fr
OL	67	Luke McCormick	Fr
OL	70	Jordan McClaine	Jr
OL	73	Carter Lees	Sr
OL	75	Cobe Williams	Fr
OL	76	Matt Colvin	Fr
OL	77	Isaac Gray	Fr
OL	78	Dylan Daring	Jr
OL	79	Duane Johnson	Sr
WR	80	Drew Porter	So
WR	82	Bodie Neal	Fr
WR	83	Jarrett Atchley	Fr
TE	85	Levi Mercer	Fr
WR	86	Jackson Richardson	Fr
TE	87	Mike Ericson	Jr
TE	88	Dylan Cummings	Fr
RB		Chris Banard	Fr
RB		Ben Boehm	Fr
OL		Quan'Travious Bradford	Fr
OL		Pablo Cerda	Fr
RB		Da'Shawn Chairs	Fr
WR		Jack Citty	Fr
OL		Cason Craig	Fr
RB		Payton Evans-Pickens	Fr
RB		Antonio Ford	Fr
OL		Lucas McCain	Fr
OL		Talan Owen	Fr
WR		Bob Patterson	Fr
OL		John Silvestri	Fr
WR		Mabry Verser	Fr
OL		Gavin Waters	Fr
RB		Bo Williams	Fr
WR		Dane Williams	Fr

Defense

Pos.	#	Name	Class
DB	0	Darion Dunlap-Johnson	Sr
DB	1	Kendale Allen	Sr
DB	2	Kyle McDonald	Sr
LB	3	Cayden Pierce	Sr
DB	4	Deion Campbell	So
DB	6	Travis Greenwalt	Sr
DL	9	Dre Hall	Sr
DB	11	Grayson Lewis	Fr
DB	12	Troy Wiseman	So
DB	13	Jeremiah Johnson	So
DB	16	Lamont Cox	Fr
DB	17	Luke Martin	So
DB	19	Josh Gatlin	Fr
DB	20	Ty Dugger	Jr
DL	23	Tirrell Johnson	So
LB	24	Clark Griffin	Sr
DB	26	Drew Nelson	Fr
DB	27	G'Kyson Wright	Fr
DB	28	Zac O'Day	So
DB	29	Curtis Jackson	So
LB	33	Kyle Henry	Fr
DB	36	Carter Hill	Fr
LB	37	Dax Goff	Fr
DL	40	Keith Hargraves	Sr
DB	41	Elijah Carlton	Fr
LB	42	Kekoa Carroll	Sr
LB	44	Jordan Mays	Fr
DL	45	Devonte Manning	Sr
LB	46	Christian Brumley	Fr
DL	47	Nathan Muhle	Jr
DL	48	Tony Agyapong	So
LB	52	Jackson Cody	Fr
DL	55	Gage Price	Sr
DL	58	Austin Bailey	Sr
DL	89	Justin Sobczak	So
DL	90	Diego Davis	Fr
DL	91	Brock Knapton	Fr
DL	92	Bryce Rushing	Fr
DL	95	Nii Addy	Fr
DL	96	Joseph Oluwayemi	Fr
DL	99	Wesley Coleman	Sr
LB		Calan Castles	Fr
DB		Connor Dean	Fr
DB		Corey Dean	Fr
DL		Cam Draper	Fr
DB		Kelon Fountain	Fr
DB		Ayden Hamilton	Fr
DL		Beau Hardin	Fr
DL		Andrew Hodge	Fr
DB		Ahmad Jenkins	Fr
LB		B. T. McMillian	Fr
DL		Peyton McNeely	Fr
DL		Landen Meredith	Fr
DB		Xavier Rodriguez	Fr
DL		Kaden Spencer	Fr
DL		Kaleb Walker	Fr

Special teams

Pos.	#	Name	Class
P	38	Luke Mammana	Jr
K	39	Magnus Lepak	So
K	43	James Satterfield	Fr
LS	49	Xavier Hylton	Jr
LS	53	Chase Whitfield	Sr
K, P	84	Griffin Thomas	Fr
LS		Jack Edwards	Fr
LS		Aidan Hall	Fr

Head coach

- Paul Simmons

Coordinators/assistant coaches

- Roddy Mote
  Defensive coordinator/Linebackers
- Luke Tribble
  Co-defensive coordinator/Special teams coordinator/Defensive backs
- Tre'von Biglow
  Defensive line
- Sam Blakenship
  Safeties
- Kevin Chism
  Offensive line
- Ryan Derrick
  Wide receivers
- Matt Middleton
  Quarterbacks/Fullbacks
- Matt Underwood
  Director of recruiting/Slotbacks
- Kenny Wheaton
  Offensive consultant

Legend

- (C) Team captain
- (S) Suspended
- (I) Ineligible
- Injured
- Redshirt

Roster
Last update: September 10, 2024
