= 2024 Valdosta State Blazers football team =

American college football season

2024 Valdosta State Blazers football

GSC champion

NCAA Division II championship game, L 14–49 vs. Ferris State
- Conference: Gulf South Conference

Ranking
- AFCA: No. 2
- Record: 13–1 (6–0 GSC)
- Head coach: Tremaine Jackson (3rd season)
- Offensive coordinator: Graham Craig (1st season)
- Offensive scheme: Spread
- Defensive coordinator: Brandon Anderson (3rd season)
- Co-defensive coordinator: Trent Earley (1st season)
- Base defense: 3–4
- Home stadium: Bazemore–Hyder Stadium

2024 Gulf South Conference football standings
	Conf.			Overall
Team	W		L	W		L
No. 2 Valdosta State $^	6	–	0	13	–	1
No. 18 West Alabama ^	5	–	1	9	–	2
West Florida	5	–	2	7	–	3
North Greenville	4	–	3	6	–	5
Delta State	3	–	3	6	–	4
Chowan	2	–	5	3	–	7
Mississippi College	1	–	6	2	–	8
Erskine	0	–	6	1	–	8
$ – Conference champion; ^ – NCAA Division II playoff participant; Rankings from AFCA poll

The 2024 Valdosta State Blazers football team represented Valdosta State University as a member of the Gulf South Conference (GSC) during the 2024 NCAA Division II football season and played their home games at Bazemore–Hyder Stadium in Valdosta, Georgia. In their third year under head coach Tremaine Jackson, the team compiled a 13–1 record (6–0 in conference games) and won the GSC championship. The Blazers set a school record with 73 points against Erskine. They advanced to the NCAA Division II playoffs, defeating Miles in the second round, Virginia Union in the quarterfinals, and Minnesota State in the semifinals before losing to Ferris State in the Division II national championship game.

Key players include quarterback Sammy Edwards, running backs Blake Hester and Alfonso Franklin, receiver Rodney Bullard, and safety Larry Elder.

On December 21, head coach Tremaine Jackson was hired as the head coach at Prairie View A&M. Assistant head coach and co-defensive coordinator Trent Earley was named the Blazers' interim head coach.

== Schedule ==
Date	Time	Opponent	Rank	Site	Result	Attendance	Source
August 31	7:00 p.m.	Albany State*	No. 7	Bazemore–Hyder Stadium; Valdosta, Georgia	W 42–10	5,782	
September 7	7:00 p.m.	at Newberry*	No. 7	Setzler Field; Newberry, SC	W 27–14	2,520	
September 14	7:00 p.m.	Fayetteville State*	No. 6	Bazemore–Hyder Stadium; Valdosta, GA	W 34–0	4,001	
September 21	4:00 p.m.	at Erskine	No. 3	J. W. Babb Stadium; Greenwood, SC	W 73–0	375	
September 28	7:00 p.m.	West Alabama	No. 3	Bazemore–Hyder Stadium; Valdosta, GA	Cancelled		
October 5	12:00 p.m.	at Shorter*	No. 3	Barron Stadium; Rome, GA	W 59–6	1,052	
October 12	3:00 p.m.	at North Greenville	No. 3	Younts Stadium; Tigerville, SC	W 32–24	1,874	
October 19	3:00 p.m.	Mississippi College^{†}	No. 3	Bazemore–Hyder Stadium; Valdosta, GA	W 35–10	3,885	
November 2	3:00 p.m.	Chowan	No. 1	Bazemore–Hyder Stadium; Valdosta, GA	W 52–0	2,063	
November 9	3:00 p.m.	at Delta State	No. 1	Parker Field at McCool Stadium; Cleveland, MS	W 49–20	2,517	
November 16	7:00 p.m.	No. 16 West Florida	No. 1	Bazemore–Hyder Stadium; Valdosta, GA	W 28–7	3,833	
November 30	1:00 p.m.	No. 22 Miles*	No. 1	Bazemore–Hyder Stadium; Valdosta, GA (NCAA Division II Second Round)	W 33–17	1,871	
December 7	1:00 p.m.	No. 25 Virginia Union*	No. 1	Bazemore–Hyder Stadium; Valdosta, GA (NCAA Division II Quarterfinal)	W 49–14	1,993	
December 14	12:00 p.m.	Minnesota State*	No. 1	Bazemore–Hyder Stadium; Valdosta, GA (NCAA Division II Semifinal)	W 35–21	3,104	
December 21	2:00 p.m.	vs. No. 2 Ferris State*	No. 1	McKinney ISD Stadium; McKinney, TX (NCAA Division II Championship)	L 14–49	3,228	
*Non-conference game; ^{†}Homecoming; Rankings from AFCA Poll released prior to the game; All times are in Eastern time

== Rankings ==
Ranking movements Legend: ██ Increase in ranking ██ Decrease in ranking ( ) = First-place votes
	Week													
Poll	Pre	1	2	3	4	5	6	7	8	9	10	11	12	Final
AFCA	7	7*	6	3	3	3	3	3	2 (3)	1 (18)	1 (24)	1 (25)	1 (27)	2
D2 Football	6	5	5	3	3	3	3	3	2	3	2	2	2	2

* A new poll was not released for this week, so for comparison purposes, the previous week's ranking is inserted in this week's slot.

== Preseason ==
The Gulf South Conference released its preseason prediction poll on July 23, 2024. The Blazers were predicted to finish first in the conference, receiving 5 of the 8 first place votes.

== Game summaries ==
=== Albany State ===
	1	2	3	4	Total
Golden Rams	0	3	7	0	10
No. 7 Blazers	14	7	14	7	42

Statistics	ASU	VSU
First downs	17	22
Total yards	318	462
Rushing yards	101	135
Passing yards	217	327
Turnovers	2	0
Time of possession	29:15	30:45

Team	Category	Player	Statistics
Albany State	Passing	Isaiah Knowles	19/31, 217 yards
Albany State	Rushing	Tiant Wyche	8 rushes, 79 yards, TD
Albany State	Receiving	Javion Jackson	8 receptions, 122 yards
Valdosta State	Passing	Sammy Edwards	18/25, 306 yards, 4 TD
Valdosta State	Rushing	Jaedon Henry	9 rushes, 34 yards
Valdosta State	Receiving	Rodney Bullard	4 receptions, 100 yards, 2 TD

=== At Newberry ===
	1	2	3	4	Total
No. 7 Blazers	7	10	7	3	27
Wolves	0	7	0	7	14

Statistics	VSU	NEW
First downs	25	15
Total yards	337	216
Rushing yards	190	166
Passing yards	147	50
Turnovers	1	0
Time of possession	34:42	25:18

Team	Category	Player	Statistics
Valdosta State	Passing	Sammy Edwards	16/24, 147 yards, TD
Valdosta State	Rushing	Blake Hester	11 rushes, 59 yards, TD
Valdosta State	Receiving	Graeson Malashevich	4 receptions, 41 yards
Newberry	Passing	Izayah Whiteside	7/11, 50 yards
Newberry	Rushing	Izayah Whiteside	12 rushes, 84 yards, TD
Newberry	Receiving	Tommy Washington	3 receptions, 23 yards

=== Fayetteville State ===
	1	2	3	4	Total
Broncos	0	0	0	0	0
No. 6 Blazers	7	17	7	3	34

Statistics	FSU	VSU
First downs	14	29
Total yards	216	502
Rushing yards	99	186
Passing yards	117	316
Turnovers	0	0
Time of possession	24:06	35:54

Team	Category	Player	Statistics
Fayetteville State	Passing	Demari Daniels	10/23, 104 yards
Fayetteville State	Rushing	Bryce Council	8 rushes, 49 yards
Fayetteville State	Receiving	David Baros	3 receptions, 50 yards
Valdosta State	Passing	Sammy Edwards	23/33, 290 yards, TD
Valdosta State	Rushing	Blake Hester	6 rushes, 102 yards, 3 TD
Valdosta State	Receiving	Rodney Bullard	3 receptions, 77 yards

=== At Erskine ===
	1	2	3	4	Total
No. 3 Blazers	14	24	21	14	73
Flying Fleet	0	0	0	0	0

Statistics	VSU	ERS
First downs	24	4
Total yards	577	74
Rushing yards	293	5
Passing yards	284	69
Turnovers	0	4
Time of possession	29:04	30:56

Team	Category	Player	Statistics
Valdosta State	Passing	Sammy Edwards	11/15, 257 yards, 5 TD
Valdosta State	Rushing	Alfonso Franklin	10 rushes, 131 yards, 3 TD
Valdosta State	Receiving	Rodney Bullard	3 receptions, 114 yards, 3 TD
Erskine	Passing	Breylon Boyd	4/9, 65 yards, 2 INT
Erskine	Rushing	Rashad Luckey	11 rushes, 27 yards
Erskine	Receiving	Rodshaun Dorsey	2 receptions, 53 yards

=== At Shorter ===
	1	2	3	4	Total
No. 3 Blazers	14	14	14	17	59
Hawks	0	6	0	0	6

Statistics	VSU	SU
First downs	28	9
Total yards	557	195
Rushing yards	146	32
Passing yards	411	163
Turnovers	0	2
Time of possession	28:31	31:29

Team	Category	Player	Statistics
Valdosta State	Passing	Sammy Edwards	19/29, 348 yards, 2 TD
Valdosta State	Rushing	Blake Hester	7 rushes, 62 yards, TD
Valdosta State	Receiving	Tyler Ajiero	4 receptions, 97 yards, 2 TD
Shorter	Passing	Harold Cook	12/20, 163 yards, INT
Shorter	Rushing	Lanear McCrary Jr.	12 rushes, 32 yards
Shorter	Receiving	Cobie Mates	2 receptions, 59 yards

=== At North Greenville ===
	1	2	3	4	Total
No. 3 Blazers	2	14	6	10	32
Trailblazers	14	10	0	0	24

Statistics	VSU	NGU
First downs	25	19
Total yards	415	320
Rushing yards	169	117
Passing yards	246	203
Turnovers	0	1
Time of possession	32:41	27:19

Team	Category	Player	Statistics
Valdosta State	Passing	Sammy Edwards	22/34, 246 yards, TD
Valdosta State	Rushing	Blake Hester	24 rushes, 111 yards, TD
Valdosta State	Receiving	Rodney Bullard	4 receptions, 50 yards
North Greenville	Passing	Dylan Ramirez	14/27, 203 yards, 2 TD
North Greenville	Rushing	Jacob Walker	14 rushes, 87 yards, TD
North Greenville	Receiving	Dre' Williams	5 receptions, 75 yards, TD

=== Mississippi College ===
	1	2	3	4	Total
Choctaws	0	7	0	3	10
No. 3 Blazers	14	7	14	0	35

Statistics	MC	VSU
First downs	15	19
Total yards	261	480
Rushing yards	223	191
Passing yards	38	289
Turnovers	2	1
Time of possession	32:50	27:10

Team	Category	Player	Statistics
Mississippi College	Passing	Preston Godfrey	1/3, 38 yards, INT
Mississippi College	Rushing	Marcus Williams	25 rushes, 86 yards
Mississippi College	Receiving	Jacob Stephens	1 reception, 38 yards
Valdosta State	Passing	Sammy Edwards	20/30, 289 yards, 4 TD
Valdosta State	Rushing	Blake Hester	11 rushes, 91 yards
Valdosta State	Receiving	Tyler Ajiero	4 receptions, 57 yards, 2 TD

=== Chowan ===
	1	2	3	4	Total
Hawks	0	0	0	0	0
No. 1 Blazers	0	14	17	21	52

Statistics	CHO	VSU
First downs	18	22
Total yards	292	573
Rushing yards	141	339
Passing yards	151	234
Turnovers	4	1
Time of possession	35:43	24:10

Team	Category	Player	Statistics
Chowan	Passing	Maurice Smith	17/27, 139 yards, INT
Chowan	Rushing	Maurice Smith	12 rushes, 79 yards
Chowan	Receiving	Gabriel Jackson	2 receptions, 48 yards
Valdosta State	Passing	Sammy Edwards	14/20, 225 yards, 2 TD, INT
Valdosta State	Rushing	Blake Hester	12 rushes, 121 yards, 3 TD
Valdosta State	Receiving	Rodney Bullard	2 receptions, 87 yards, TD

=== At Delta State ===
	1	2	3	4	Total
No. 1 Blazers	14	14	14	7	49
Statesmen	7	6	0	7	20

Statistics	VSU	DSU
First downs	17	24
Total yards	356	352
Rushing yards	169	239
Passing yards	187	113
Turnovers	1	3
Time of possession	27:32	32:28

Team	Category	Player	Statistics
Valdosta State	Passing	Sammy Edwards	12/19, 187 yards, TD, INT
Valdosta State	Rushing	Alfonso Franklin	14 rushes, 107 yards, 3 TD
Valdosta State	Receiving	Rodney Bullard	3 receptions, 121 yards, TD
Delta State	Passing	Cole Kirk	13/32, 113 yards, TD
Delta State	Rushing	Kelvin Smith	25 rushes, 112 yards
Delta State	Receiving	Kelvin Smith	4 receptions, 57 yards

=== No. 16 West Florida ===
	1	2	3	4	Total
No. 16 Argonauts	0	0	7	0	7
No. 1 Blazers	0	14	7	7	28

Statistics	UWF	VSU
First downs	10	20
Total yards	209	358
Rushing yards	80	204
Passing yards	129	154
Turnovers	0	0
Time of possession	25:14	34:46

Team	Category	Player	Statistics
West Florida	Passing	Marcus Stokes	11/24, 129 yards
West Florida	Rushing	Marcus Stokes	9 rushes, 33 yards, TD
West Florida	Receiving	Javon Swinton	3 receptions, 47 yards
Valdosta State	Passing	Sammy Edwards	14/20, 154 yards, 2 TD
Valdosta State	Rushing	Blake Hester	21 rushes, 118 yards, TD
Valdosta State	Receiving	Rodney Bullard	3 receptions, 74 yards, TD

=== No. 22 Miles (NCAA Division II Second Round) ===
	1	2	3	4	Total
No. 22 Golden Bears	3	0	0	14	17
No. 1 Blazers	13	3	14	3	33

Statistics	MIL	VSU
First downs	19	18
Total yards	307	408
Rushing yards	83	230
Passing yards	224	178
Turnovers	1	0
Time of possession	30:21	29:39

Team	Category	Player	Statistics
Miles	Passing	Kam Ivory	22/41, 224 yards, 2 TD, INT
Miles	Rushing	Jonero Scott	17 rushes, 54 yards
Miles	Receiving	Jaquel Fells	7 receptions, 92 yards
Valdosta State	Passing	Sammy Edwards	14/28, 178 yards, TD
Valdosta State	Rushing	Blake Hester	20 rushes, 132 yards, 2 TD
Valdosta State	Receiving	Graeson Malashevich	4 receptions, 68 yards

=== No. 25 Virginia Union (NCAA Division II Quarterfinal) ===
	1	2	3	4	Total
No. 25 Panthers	0	7	0	7	14
No. 1 Blazers	7	21	14	7	49

Statistics	VUU	VSU
First downs	12	21
Total yards	227	560
Rushing yards	139	223
Passing yards	88	337
Turnovers	2	0
Time of possession	29:21	30:39

Team	Category	Player	Statistics
Virginia Union	Passing	R. J. Rosales	8/16, 88 yards, TD
Virginia Union	Rushing	Jada Byers	22 rushes, 109 yards, TD
Virginia Union	Receiving	Keon Davis	1 reception, 42 yards
Valdosta State	Passing	Sammy Edwards	13/19, 302 yards, 4 TD
Valdosta State	Rushing	Alfonso Franklin	15 rushes, 64 yards, 2 TD
Valdosta State	Receiving	Rodney Bullard	5 receptions, 158 yards, 3 TD

=== Minnesota State (NCAA Division II Semifinal) ===
	1	2	3	4	Total
Mavericks	0	7	7	7	21
No. 1 Blazers	7	7	14	7	35

Statistics	MSU	VSU
First downs	18	21
Total yards	325	385
Rushing yards	177	213
Passing yards	148	172
Turnovers	1	0
Time of possession	30:09	29:51

Team	Category	Player	Statistics
Minnesota State	Passing	Hayden Ekern	14/25, 148 yards, TD, INT
Minnesota State	Rushing	Sam Backer	10 rushes, 109 yards, 2 TD
Minnesota State	Receiving	Grant Guyett	4 receptions, 47 yards
Valdosta State	Passing	Sammy Edwards	14/19, 172 yards, 2 TD
Valdosta State	Rushing	Alfonso Franklin	24 rushes, 152 yards, 3 TD
Valdosta State	Receiving	Alfonso Franklin	4 receptions, 66 yards, 2 TD

=== Vs. No. 2 Ferris State (NCAA Division II Championship) ===
	1	2	3	4	Total
No. 2 Bulldogs	14	14	14	7	49
No. 1 Blazers	0	7	7	0	14

Statistics	FSU	VSU
First downs	21	19
Total yards	465	311
Rushing yards	251	121
Passing yards	214	190
Turnovers	0	1
Time of possession	29:15	30:45

Team	Category	Player	Statistics
Ferris State	Passing	Trinidad Chambliss	11/20, 153 yards, 3 TD
Ferris State	Rushing	Kannon Katzer	14 rushes, 97 yards
Ferris State	Receiving	Cam Underwood	3 receptions, 86 yards, 2 TD
Valdosta State	Passing	Sammy Edwards	25/42, 190 yards, 2 TD
Valdosta State	Rushing	Alfonso Franklin	14 rushes, 102 yards
Valdosta State	Receiving	Tyler Ajiero	5 receptions, 57 yards, TD
