= 2024 NCAA Division II football rankings =

Rankings for the 2024 NCAA Division II football season

- Season: 2024
- Postseason: Single-elimination
- Preseason No. 1: Harding
- National champions: Ferris State
- Conference with most teams in final AFCA poll: PSAC & NSIC (3)

The 2024 National Collegiate Athletic Association (NCAA) Division II football rankings consists primarily of The AFCA Coaches' Poll, determined by coaches part of NCAA Division II football programs. The following weekly polls determine the top 25 teams at the NCAA Division II level of college football for the 2024 season.

== Legend ==
	Increase in ranking
	Decrease in ranking
	Not ranked previous week or no change
	Selected for College Football Playoff
(#–#)	Win–loss record
(Italics)	Number of first place votes
т	Tied with team above or below also with this symbol

== American Football Coaches Association (AFCA) poll ==
	Preseason August 12	Week 2 September 9	Week 3 September 16	Week 4 September 23	Week 5 September 30	Week 6 October 7	Week 7 October 14	Week 8 October 21	Week 9 October 28	Week 10 November 4	Week 11 November 11	Week 12 November 18	Week 13 (Final) December 23	
1.	Harding (25)	Harding (1–0) (27)	Harding (2–0) (27)	Harding (3–0) (29)	Harding (4–0) (29)	Harding (5–0) (30)	Harding (6–0) (30)	Grand Valley State (7–0) (27)	Valdosta State (7–0) (18)	Valdosta State (8–0) (24)	Valdosta State (9–0) (25)	Valdosta State (10–0) (27)	Ferris State (14–1) (27)	1.
2.	Central Missouri	Central Missouri (1–0) (1)	Grand Valley State (2–0) (1)	Grand Valley State (3–0)	Grand Valley State (4–0)	Grand Valley State (5–0)	Grand Valley State (6–0)	Valdosta State (7–0) (3)	Ferris State (7–1) (8)	Ferris State (8–1) (6)	Ferris State (9–1) (5)	Ferris State (10–1) (3)	Valdosta State (13–1)	2.
3.	Ferris State (1)	Grand Valley State (1–0) (1)	Valdosta State (3–0)	Valdosta State (4–0)	Valdosta State (4–0)	Valdosta State (5–0)	Valdosta State (6–0)	Ferris State (6–1)	Ouachita Baptist (8–0) (2)	Kutztown (9–0)	Kutztown (10–0)	Kutztown (11–0)	Slippery Rock (12–2)	3.
4.	Grand Valley State (1)	Pittsburg State (2–0)	Colorado Mines (2–0)	Colorado Mines (3–0)	Colorado Mines (4–0)	Ferris State (4–1)	Ferris State (5–1)	Kutztown (7–0)	Kutztown (8–0)	Harding (8–1)	Harding (9–1)	Harding (10–1)	Harding (12–2)	4.
5.	Colorado Mines	Colorado Mines (1–0)	Ferris State (2–1)	Ferris State (2–1)	Ferris State (3–1)	Kutztown (5–0)	Kutztown (6–0)	Ouachita Baptist (7–0)	Pittsburgh State (7–1) (1)	Grand Valley State (8–1)	Grand Valley State (9–1)	Grand Valley State (10–1)	Kutztown (11–1)	5.
6.	Pittsburg State	Valdosta State (2–0)	Lenoir–Rhyne (2–0)	Lenoir–Rhyne (3–0)	Lenoir–Rhyne (4–0)	Slippery Rock (5–0)	Slippery Rock (6–0)	Pittsburg State (6–1)	Harding (7–1)	Charleston (WV) (9–0)	Charleston (WV) (10–0)	Charleston (WV) (11–0)	Grand Valley State (11–2)	6.
7.	Valdosta State	Ferris State (1–1)	Kutztown (2–0)	Minnesota State (4–0)	Minnesota State (5–0)	Pittsburg State (4–1)	Pittsburg State (5–1)	Harding (6–1)	Grand Valley State (7–1)	CSU Pueblo (8–1)	CSU Pueblo (9–1)	CSU Pueblo (10–1)	Minnesota State (11–4)	7.
8.	Central Washington	Lenoir–Rhyne (1–0)	Minnesota State (3–0)	Kutztown (3–0)	Kutztown (4–0)	Western Colorado (5–0)	Western Colorado (6–0)	Western Colorado (7–0)	Western Colorado (8–0)	Central Oklahoma (8–1)	Central Oklahoma (9–1)	Central Oklahoma (10–1)	CSU Pueblo (10–2)	8.
9.	Lenoir–Rhyne	Kutztown (1–0)	Slippery Rock (2–0) (1)	Slippery Rock (3–0)	Slippery Rock (4–0)	Central Washington (4–1)	Ouachita Baptist (6–0)	Central Oklahoma (7–0)	Charleston (WV) (8–0)	Ouachita Baptist (8–1)	Ouachita Baptist (9–1)	Ouachita Baptist (10–1)	Central Oklahoma (11–2)	9.
10.	Kutztown	Slippery Rock (1–0)	Pittsburg State (2–1)	Pittsburg State (3–1)	Pittsburg State (3–1)	Ouachita Baptist (5–0)	West Alabama (5–0)	Colorado Mines (6–1)	CSU Pueblo (7–1)	Slippery Rock (7–1)	Western Colorado (9–1)	Western Colorado (10–1)	Western Colorado (11–2)	10.
11.	Slippery Rock	Minnesota State (2–0)	Central Missouri (1–1)	Emporia State (4–0)	Central Washington (3–1)	West Alabama (4–0)	Central Oklahoma (6–0)	Charleston (WV) (7–0)	Emporia State (7–1)	Western Colorado (8–1)	Slippery Rock (8–1)	Slippery Rock (9–1)	Virginia Union (10–4)	11.
12.	West Florida	West Florida (1–0)	West Florida (1–0)	Central Missouri (2–1)	Central Missouri (3–1)	Colorado Mines (4–1)	Colorado Mines (5–1)	CSU Pueblo (7–1)	Lenoir–Rhyne (7–1)	West Alabama (7–1)	West Alabama (8–1)	West Alabama (9–1)	California (PA) (10–3)	12.
13.	Minnesota State	Central Washington (0–1)	Emporia State (3–0)	Central Washington (2–1)	Western Colorado (4–0)	Central Oklahoma (5–0)	Charleston (WV) (6–0)	Minnesota State (6–1)	Central Oklahoma (7–1)	Pittsburg State (7–2)	Pittsburg State (7–2)	Pittsburg State (8–2)	Bemidji State (10–4)	13.
14.	Augustana (SD)	Augustana (SD) (1–0)	Central Washington (1–1)	Western Colorado (3–0)	Ouachita Baptist (4–0)	Charleston (WV) (5–0)	CSU Pueblo (6–1)	Emporia State (6–1)	Slippery Rock (6–1)	Colorado Mines (7–2)	Indianapolis (9–1)	Indianapolis (10–1)	Ouachita Baptist (10–2)	14.
15.	Western Colorado	Western Colorado (1–0)	Western Colorado (2–0)	Indianapolis (3–0)	West Alabama (4–0)	Minnesota State (5–1)	Minnesota State (6–1)	Slippery Rock (6–1)	West Alabama (6–1)	Indianapolis (8–1)	Augustana (SD) (8–2)	Lenoir–Rhyne (9–2)	Charleston (WV) (11–1)	15.
16.	Indianapolis	Indianapolis (1–0)	Indianapolis (2–0)	Ouachita Baptist (3–0)	Charleston (WV) (4–0)	CSU Pueblo (5–1)	Emporia State (6–1)	Lenoir–Rhyne (6–1)	Johnson C. Smith (8–0)	Augustana (SD) (7–2)	West Florida (7–2)	Angelo State (9–2)	Lenoir–Rhyne (10–3)	16.
17.	Minnesota Duluth	Delta State (2–0)	Ouachita Baptist (2–0)	West Alabama (4–0)	Central Oklahoma (4–0)	Lenoir–Rhyne (4–1)	Lenoir–Rhyne (5–1)	Carson–Newman (7–0)	Central Washington (6–2)	West Florida (6–2)	California (PA) (8–1)	Wingate (9–1)	Pittsburg State (8–3)	17.
18.	Delta State	Ouachita Baptist (1–0)	Augustana (SD) (1–1)	Augustana (SD) (2–1)	CSU Pueblo (4–1) т	Emporia State (5–1)	Carson–Newman (6–0)	West Alabama (5–1)	Colorado Mines (6–2)	California (PA) (7–1) т	Minnesota State (8–2)	Colorado Mines (8–3)	West Alabama (9–2)	18.
19.	Ouachita Baptist	Minnesota Duluth (1–0)	Charleston (WV) (2–0)	Charleston (WV) (3–0)	Emporia State (4–1) т	Delta State (4–1)	Indianapolis (5–1)	Johnson C. Smith (7–0)	Indianapolis (7–1)	Minnesota State (7–2) т	Carson–Newman (9–1)	Central Washington (8–3)	Indianapolis (10–2)	19.
20.	Virginia Union	Charleston (WV) (2–0)	Henderson State (2–0)	Henderson State (3–0)	Delta State (3–1)	Findlay (5–0)	Johnson C. Smith (6–0)	Central Washington (5–2)	Augustana (SD) (6–2)	Emporia State (7–2)	Lenoir–Rhyne (8–2)	California (PA) (8–2)	Angelo State (9–3)	20.
21.	UT Permian Basin	Emporia State (2–0)	Virginia Union (1–1)	West Florida (1–1)	IUP (4–0)	Indianapolis (4–1)	Central Washington (4–2)	Indianapolis (6–1)	West Florida (5–2)	Carson–Newman (8–1) т	Angelo State (8–2)	West Florida (7–3)	Wingate (9–2)	21.
22.	NW Missouri State	CSU Pueblo (2–0)	CSU Pueblo (2–1)	CSU Pueblo (3–1)	Indianapolis (3–1)	Johnson C. Smith (6–0)	Frostburg State (6–0)	Southern Arkansas (6–1)	Minnesota State (6–2)	Lenoir–Rhyne (7–2) т	Findlay (9–1)	Augustana (SD) (8–3)	Miles (10–3)	22.
23.	Charleston (WV)	Virginia Union (1–1)	West Alabama (3–0)	Central Oklahoma (3–0)	Findlay (4–0)	Carson–Newman (5–0)	West Florida (3–2)	West Florida (4–2)	California (PA) (7–1)	Angelo State (7–2)	Wingate (8–1)	Southern Arkansas (9–2)	Ashland (9–4)	23.
24.	Angelo State	Henderson State (1–0)	Delta State (2–1) т	Delta State (3–1)	Johnson C. Smith (5–0)	Frostburg State (5–0)	Southern Arkansas (5–1)	Delta State (5–2)	Carson–Newman (7–1)	Findlay (8–1) т	Colorado Mines (7–3)	Carson–Newman (9–2)	Central Washington (8–4)	24.
25.	Bemidji State	Fort Hays State (2–0)	Wingate (2–0) т	IUP (3–0)	Carson–Newman (4–0)	IUP (4–1)	Henderson State (5–1)	Augustana (SD) (5–2)	Findlay (7–1)	Wingate (7–1) т	Central Washington (7–3)	Central Missouri (8–3)	Augustana (SD) (8–4)	25.
	Preseason August 12	Week 2 September 9	Week 3 September 16	Week 4 September 23	Week 5 September 30	Week 6 October 7	Week 7 October 14	Week 8 October 21	Week 9 October 28	Week 10 November 4	Week 11 November 11	Week 12 November 18	Week 13 (Final) December 23	
		Dropped: UT Permian Basin; NW Missouri State; Angelo State; Bemidji State	Dropped: Minnesota Duluth; Fort Hays State	Dropped: Virginia Union; Wingate	Dropped: Augustana (SD); Henderson State; West Florida	Dropped: Central Missouri	Dropped: Delta State; Findlay; IUP	Dropped: Frostburg State; Henderson State	Dropped: Southern Arkansas; Delta State	Dropped: Johnson C. Smith; Central Washington	Dropped: Emporia State	Dropped: Minnesota State; Findlay	Dropped: Colorado Mines; West Florida; Southern Arkansas; Carson–Newman; Central Missouri	

== D2Football.com poll ==
	Preseason August 18	Week 1 September 2	Week 2 September 9	Week 3 September 16	Week 4 September 23	Week 5 September 30	Week 6 October 7	Week 7 October 14	Week 8 October 21	Week 9 October 28	Week 10 November 4	Week 11 November 11	Week 12 November 18	Week 13 (Final) December 22	
1.	Harding	Harding (0–0)	Harding (1–0)	Harding (2–0)	Harding (3–0)	Harding (4–0)	Harding (5–0)	Harding (6–0)	Grand Valley State (7–0)	Pittsburg State (7–1)	Ferris State (8–1)	Ferris State (9–1)	Ferris State (10–1)	Ferris State (14–1)	1.
2.	Central Missouri	Central Missouri (0–0)	Central Missouri (1–0)	Grand Valley State (2–0)	Grand Valley State (3–0)	Grand Valley State (4–0)	Grand Valley State (5–0)	Grand Valley State (6–0)	Valdosta State (7–0)	Ferris State (7–1)	Valdosta State (8–0)	Valdosta State (9–0)	Valdosta State (10–0)	Valdosta State (13–1)	2.
3.	Ferris State	Pittsburg State (1–0)	Pittsburg State (2–0)	Valdosta State (2–0)	Valdosta State (4–0)	Valdosta State (4–0)	Valdosta State (5–0)	Valdosta State (6–0)	Pittsburg State (6–1)	Valdosta State (7–0)	Kutztown (9–0)	Kutztown (10–0)	Kutztown (11–0)	Slippery Rock (12–2)	3.
4.	Pittsburg State	Grand Valley State (0–0)	Grand Valley State (1–0)	Minnesota State (2–0)	Minnesota State (4–0)	Minnesota State (5–0)	Pittsburg State (4–1)	Pittsburg State (5–1)	Ferris State (6–1)	Kutztown (8–0)	Grand Valley State (8–1)	Grand Valley State (9–1)	Grand Valley State (10–1)	Harding (12–2)	4.
5.	Grand Valley State	Valdosta State (1–0)	Valdosta State (2–0)	Colorado Mines (2–0)	Pittsburg State (3–1)	Pittsburg State (3–1)	Ferris State (4–1)	Ferris State (5–1)	Kutztown (7–0)	Ouachita Baptist (8–0)	Harding (8–1)	Harding (9–1)	Harding (10–1)	Minnesota State (11–4)	5.
6.	Valdosta State	Colorado Mines (0–0)	Colorado Mines (1–0)	Pittsburg State (2–1)	Ferris State (2–1)	Ferris State (3–1)	Kutztown (5–0)	Kutztown (6–0)	Central Oklahoma (7–0)	Grand Valley State (7–1)	CSU Pueblo (8–1)	CSU Pueblo (9–1)	CSU Pueblo (10–1)	Grand Valley State (11–2)	6.
7.	Colorado Mines	Central Washington (0–0)	Minnesota State (2–0)	Ferris State (2–1)	Colorado Mines (3–0)	Colorado Mines (4–0)	Central Washington (4–1)	Slippery Rock (6–0)	Ouachita Baptist (7–0)	Harding (7–1)	Central Oklahoma (8–1)	Central Oklahoma (9–1)	Central Oklahoma (10–1)	Kutztown (11–1)	7.
8.	Central Washington	Minnesota State (1–0)	Ferris State (1–1)	Kutztown (2–0)	Kutztown (3–0)	Kutztown (4–0)	Slippery Rock (5–0)	Central Oklahoma (6–0)	Harding (6–1)	Western Colorado (8–0)	Pittsburg State (7–2)	Pittsburg State (7–2)	Pittsburg State (8–2)	Central Oklahoma (11–2)	8.
9.	Kutztown	Ferris State (0–1)	Kutztown (1–0)	Central Washington (1–1)	Central Washington (2–1)	Central Washington (3–1)	Minnesota State (5–1)	Minnesota State (6–1)	Minnesota State (6–1)	Central Oklahoma (7–1)	Charleston (WV) (9–0)	Charleston (WV) (10–0)	Charleston (WV) (11–0)	Bemidji State (10–4)	9.
10.	Slippery Rock	Kutztown (0–0)	Central Washington (0–1)	Slippery Rock (2–0)	Slippery Rock (3–0)	Slippery Rock (4–0)	Western Colorado (5–0)	Western Colorado (6–0)	Western Colorado (7–0)	CSU Pueblo (7–1)	Augustana (SD) (7–2)	Augustana (SD) (8–2)	Western Colorado (10–1)	California (PA) (10–3)	10.
11.	Minnesota State	Slippery Rock (0–0)	Slippery Rock (1–0)	Central Missouri (1–1)	Central Missouri (2–1)	Lenoir–Rhyne (4–0)	Central Oklahoma (5–0)	Ouachita Baptist (6–0)	CSU Pueblo (7–1)	Central Washington (6–2)	Western Colorado (8–1)	Western Colorado (9–1)	Ouachita Baptist (10–1)	CSU Pueblo (10–2)	11.
12.	Lenoir–Rhyne	Delta State (1–0)	Delta State (2–0)	Lenoir–Rhyne (2–0)	Lenoir–Rhyne (3–0)	Western Colorado (4–0)	Ouachita Baptist (5–0)	West Alabama (5–0)	Colorado Mines (6–1)	Charleston (WV) (8–0)	Ouachita Baptist (8–1)	Ouachita Baptist (9–1)	Slippery Rock (9–1)	Virginia Union (10–4)	12.
13.	West Florida	Lenoir–Rhyne (0–0)	Lenoir–Rhyne (1–0)	West Florida (1–0)	Western Colorado (3–0)	Central Missouri (3–1)	West Alabama (4–0)	CSU Pueblo (6–1)	Central Washington (5–2)	Emporia State (7–1)	Slippery Rock (7–1)	Slippery Rock (8–1)	West Alabama (9–1)	Western Colorado (11–2)	13.
14.	Delta State	West Florida (0–0)	West Florida (1–0)	Western Colorado (2–0)	Indianapolis (3–0)	Ouachita Baptist (4–0)	CSU Pueblo (5–1)	Colorado Mines (5–1)	Charleston (WV) (7–0)	Augustana (SD) (6–2)	West Alabama (7–1)	West Alabama (8–1)	Wingate (9–1)	Pittsburg State (8–3)	14.
15.	Indianapolis	UT Permian Basin (1–0)	Indianapolis (1–0)	Indianapolis (2–0)	Emporia State (4–0)	West Alabama (4–0)	Colorado Mines (4–1)	Central Washington (4–2)	Emporia State (6–1)	Slippery Rock (6–1)	Minnesota State (7–2)	Minnesota State (8–2)	Angelo State (9–2)	Ouachita Baptist (10–2)	15.
16.	UT Permian Basin	Indianapolis (0–0)	Western Colorado (1–0)	Ouachita Baptist (2–0)	Ouachita Baptist (3–0)	Bemidji State (4–1)	Charleston (WV) (5–0)	Charleston (WV) (6–0)	Slippery Rock (6–1)	Lenoir–Rhyne (7–1)	Indianapolis (8–1)	Indianapolis (9–1)	Indianapolis (10–1)	West Alabama (9–2)	16.
17.	Ouachita Baptist	Ouachita Baptist (0–0)	Ouachita Baptist (1–0)	Henderson State (2–0)	Henderson State (3–0)	Central Oklahoma (4–0)	Emporia State (5–1)	Emporia State (6–1)	Carson–Newman (7–0)	West Alabama (6–1)	California (PA) (7–1)	California (PA) (8–1)	Augustana (SD) (8–3)	Central Missouri (9–3)	17.
18.	Virginia Union	Virginia Union (1–0)	Augustana (SD) (1–0)	Emporia State (3–0)	West Alabama (4–0)	Charleston (WV) (4–0)	Carson–Newman (5–0)	Carson–Newman (6–0)	Lenoir–Rhyne (6–1)	Minnesota State (6–2)	Wingate (7–1)	Wingate (8–1)	California (PA) (8–2)	Charleston (WV) (11–1)	18.
19.	Western Colorado	Western Colorado (1–0)	Henderson State (1–0)	Augustana (SD) (1–1)	Augustana (SD) (2–1)	CSU Pueblo (4–1)	Lenoir–Rhyne (4–1)	Lenoir–Rhyne (5–1)	West Alabama (5–1)	Johnson C. Smith (8–0)	Emporia State (7–2)	Angelo State (8–2)	Fort Hays State (8–3)	Miles (10–3)	19.
20.	Bemidji State	Bemidji State (1–0)	Minnesota Duluth (1–0)	Virginia Union (1–1)	West Florida (1–1)	Emporia State (4–1)	Augustana (SD) (3–2)	Augustana (SD) (4–2)	Augustana (SD) (5–2)	Colorado Mines (6–2)	Angelo State (7–2)	Carson–Newman (9–1)	Central Missouri (8–3)	Ashland (9–4)	20.
21.	Augustana (SD)	Augustana (SD) (0–0)	Fort Hays State (2–0)	Bemidji State (2–1)	Bemidji State (3–1)	Carson–Newman (4–0)	Johnson C. Smith (6–0)	Johnson C. Smith (6–0)	Johnson C. Smith (7–0)	Indianapolis (7–1)	Colorado Mines (7–2)	West Florida (7–2)	East Stroudsburg (10–1)	Lenoir–Rhyne (10–3)	21.
22.	NW Missouri State	Henderson State (0–0)	Virginia Union (1–1)	Charleston (WV) (2–0)	Charleston (WV) (3–0)	Indianapolis (3–1)	Indianapolis (4–1)	Indianapolis (5–1)	Indianapolis (6–1)	California (PA) (7–1)	Carson–Newman (8–1)	East Stroudsburg (9–1)	Miles (9–2)	Wingate (9–2)	22.
23.	Henderson State	Minnesota Duluth (1–0)	Bemidji State (1–1)	Wingate (2–0)	Central Oklahoma (3–0)	Johnson C. Smith (5–0)	Findlay (5–0)	Saginaw Valley State (5–1)	Wayne State (NE) (6–1)	Emory & Henry (7–1)	Sioux Falls (7–2)	Fort Hays State (7–3)	Central Washington (8–3)	Augustana (SD) (8–4)	23.
24.	Charleston (WV)	Fort Hays State (1–0)	Charleston (WV) (2–0)	Delta State (2–1)	CSU Pueblo (3–1)	IUP (4–0)	Saginaw Valley State (4–1)	Wayne State (NE) (5–1)	California (PA) (6–1)	Sioux Falls (7–2)	Saginaw Valley State (7–2)	Central Missouri (7–3)	Bemidji State (8–3)	Angelo State (9–3)	24.
25.	Minnesota Duluth	Charleston (WV) (1–0)	CSU Pueblo (2–0)	Central Oklahoma (2–0)	Carson–Newman (3–0)	Augustana (SD) (2–2)	Delta State (4–1)	Frostburg State (6–0)	Southern Arkansas (6–1)	Carson–Newman (7–1)	Johnson C. Smith (8–1)	Miles (8–1)	Virginia Union (8–3)	Indianapolis (10–2)	25.
	Preseason August 18	Week 1 September 2	Week 2 September 9	Week 3 September 16	Week 4 September 23	Week 5 September 30	Week 6 October 7	Week 7 October 14	Week 8 October 21	Week 9 October 28	Week 10 November 4	Week 11 November 11	Week 12 November 18	Week 13 (Final) December 22	
		Dropped: NW Missouri State	Dropped: UT Permian Basin	Dropped: Minnesota Duluth; Fort Hays State; CSU Pueblo	Dropped: Virginia Union; Wingate; Delta State	Dropped: Henderson State; West Florida	Dropped: Central Missouri; Bemidji State; IUP	Dropped: Findlay; Delta State	Dropped: Saginaw Valley State; Frostburg State	Dropped: Wayne State (NE); Southern Arkansas	Dropped: Central Washington; Lenoir–Rhyne; Emory & Henry	Dropped: Emporia State; Colorado Mines; Sioux Falls; Saginaw Valley State; Johnson C. Smith	Dropped: Minnesota State; Carson–Newman; West Florida	Dropped: Fort Hays State; East Stroudsburg; Central Washington	
