= 2024 Ferris State Bulldogs football team =

American college football season

2024 Ferris State Bulldogs football

GLIAC champion NCAA Division II national champion

NCAA Division II National Championship Game, W 49–14 vs. Valdosta State
- Conference: Great Lakes Intercollegiate Athletic Conference

Ranking
- AFCA: No. 1
- Record: 14–1 (7–0 GLIAC)
- Head coach: Tony Annese (13th season)
- Offensive coordinator: Steve Annese (13th season)
- Offensive scheme: Spread option
- Defensive coordinator: Ryan Hodges (10th season)
- Co-defensive coordinator: Tony Annese II (1st season)
- Base defense: 4–3
- Home stadium: Top Taggart Field

2024 Great Lakes Intercollegiate Athletic Conference football standings
	Conf.			Overall
Team	W		L	W		L
No. 1 Ferris State $^	7	–	0	14	–	1
No. 6 Grand Valley State ^	6	–	1	11	–	2
Davenport	4	–	3	7	–	4
Michigan Tech	4	–	3	7	–	4
Saginaw Valley State	4	–	3	7	–	4
Wayne State (MI)	2	–	5	2	–	9
Roosevelt*	1	–	6	1	–	9
Northern Michigan	0	–	7	0	–	11
$ – Conference champion; ^ – NCAA Division II playoff participant; * – Roosevelt ineligible for postseason play due to transition from NAIA; Rankings from AFCA poll

The 2024 Ferris State Bulldogs football team was an American football team that represented Ferris State University as a member of the Great Lakes Intercollegiate Athletic Conference (GLIAC) during the 2024 NCAA Division II football season. In their 13th season under head coach Tony Annese, the Bulldogs compiled a 14–1 record and were ranked No. 1 in the D2Football.com poll at the end of the regular season. After losing the season opener on the road against Pittsburg State, the Bulldogs finished the season with 14 consecutive victories and won the GLIAC championship and the NCAA Division II national championship. Ferris State participated in the NCAA Division II Football Championship playoffs, beating Central Oklahoma in the second round, defending national champion Harding in the quarterfinals, Slippery Rock in the semifinals, and Valdosta State in the NCAA Division II national championship game.

The Bulldogs set a new program single-game scoring record with 84 points against American International. They also scored 78 points (the most ever by Ferris State in a playoff game) and tallied 688 yards of total offense against Central Oklahoma in a second-round playoff game.

Key players include junior quarterback Trinidad Chambliss, junior running back Kannon Katzer, senior slot receiver Emari O'Brien, and junior linebacker Iosefa Saipaia.

== Schedule ==
Date	Time	Opponent	Rank	Site	Result	Attendance	Source
August 31	7:00 p.m.	at No. 6 Pittsburg State*	No. 3	Carnie Smith Stadium; Pittsburg, KS	L 3–19	10,189	
September 7	6:00 p.m.	Lake Erie*	No. 3	Top Taggart Field; Big Rapids, MI	W 56–3	6,317	
September 14	6:00 p.m.	Ashland*	No. 5	Top Taggart Field; Big Rapids, MI	W 43–3	5,406	
September 28	12:00 p.m.	at American International*	No. 5	Ronald J. Abdow Field; Springfield, MA	W 84–7	1,468	
October 5	2:00 p.m.	Roosevelt^{†}	No. 5	Top Taggart Field; Big Rapids, MI	W 55–13	5,712	
October 12	6:00 p.m.	at Wayne State (MI)	No. 4	Adams Field; Detroit, MI	W 27–14	2,121	
October 19	1:00 p.m.	Michigan Tech	No. 4	Top Taggart Field; Big Rapids, MI	W 51–13	4,720	
October 26	3:00 p.m.	at No. 1 Grand Valley State	No. 3	Lubbers Stadium; Allendale, MI (Anchor–Bone Classic)	W 34–7	16,332	
November 2	1:00 p.m.	at Northern Michigan	No. 2	Superior Dome; Marquette, MI	W 55–9	1,873	
November 9	1:00 p.m.	Saginaw Valley State	No. 2	Top Taggart Field; Big Rapids, MI	W 27–24	2,856	
November 16	1:00 p.m.	Davenport	No. 2	Top Taggart Field; Big Rapids, MI (Calder City Classic)	W 24–9	2,149	
November 30	12:00 p.m.	No. 8 Central Oklahoma*	No. 2	Top Taggart Field; Big Rapids, MI (NCAA Division II Second Round)	W 78–17	1,245	
December 7	1:00 p.m.	No. 4 Harding*	No. 2	Top Taggart Field; Big Rapids, MI (NCAA Division II Quarterfinal)	W 41–7	4,120	
December 14	3:30 p.m.	No. 11 Slippery Rock*	No. 2	Top Taggart Field; Big Rapids, MI (NCAA Division II Semifinal)	W 48–38	2,521	
December 21	2:00 p.m.	vs. No. 1 Valdosta State*	No. 2	McKinney ISD Stadium; McKinney, TX (NCAA Division II National Championship Game)	W 49–14	3,228	
*Non-conference game; ^{†}Homecoming; Rankings from AFCA Poll released prior to the game; All times are in Eastern time

== Rankings ==
Ranking movements Legend: ██ Increase in ranking ██ Decrease in ranking ( ) = First-place votes
	Week													
Poll	Pre	1	2	3	4	5	6	7	8	9	10	11	12	Final
AFCA	3 (1)	3 (1)*	7	5	5	5	4	4	3	2	2	2	2	1 (27)
D2 Football	3	9	8	7	6	6	5	5	4	2	1	1	1	1

* A new poll was not released for this week, so for comparison purposes, the previous week's ranking is inserted in this week's slot.

== GLIAC preseason poll ==
In the Great Lakes Intercollegiate Athletic Conference preseason media poll released on August 1, 2024, Ferris State was projected to finish first in the conference.

== Game summaries ==
=== At No. 6 Pittsburg State ===
	1	2	3	4	Total
No. 3 Bulldogs	0	3	0	0	3
No. 6 Gorillas	3	3	10	3	19

Statistics	FSU	PSU
First downs	7	19
Total yards	171	316
Rushing yards	38	110
Passing yards	133	206
Turnovers	4	1
Time of possession	21:07	38:53

Team	Category	Player	Statistics
Ferris State	Passing	Trinidad Chambliss	13/20, 133 yards, 2 INT
Ferris State	Rushing	Carson Gulker	8 rushes, 31 yards
Ferris State	Receiving	Tyrese Hunt-Thompson	3 receptions, 68 yards
Pittsburg State	Passing	Chad Dodson Jr.	22/33, 206 yards, INT
Pittsburg State	Rushing	Cleo Chandler Jr.	11 rushes, 49 yards, TD
Pittsburg State	Receiving	Jack Roberts	4 receptions, 41 yards

=== Lake Erie ===
	1	2	3	4	Total
Storm	3	0	0	0	3
No. 3 Bulldogs	35	14	0	7	56

Statistics	LEC	FSU
First downs	10	27
Total yards	144	654
Rushing yards	67	283
Passing yards	77	371
Turnovers	2	3
Time of possession	28:46	31:14

Team	Category	Player	Statistics
Lake Erie	Passing	Alec Lewis	5/9, 50 yards
Lake Erie	Rushing	Nick Mosley	17 rushes, 55 yards
Lake Erie	Receiving	Tyrone Lindsey	2 receptions, 34 yards
Ferris State	Passing	Trinidad Chambliss	16/22, 246 yards, 3 TD
Ferris State	Rushing	Carson Gulker	2 rushes, 67 yards
Ferris State	Receiving	Kannon Katzer	3 receptions, 61 yards, TD

=== Ashland ===
	1	2	3	4	Total
Eagles	3	0	0	0	3
No. 5 Bulldogs	14	22	7	0	43

Statistics	ASH	FSU
First downs	13	30
Total yards	145	530
Rushing yards	36	197
Passing yards	109	333
Turnovers	1	1
Time of possession	24:09	35:51

Team	Category	Player	Statistics
Ashland	Passing	Trevor Bycznski	9/23, 109 yards, INT
Ashland	Rushing	Ty'aris Stevenson	11 rushes, 27 yards
Ashland	Receiving	Tony Pannunzio	4 receptions, 40 yards
Ferris State	Passing	Trinidad Chambliss	23/30, 286 yards, 2 TD
Ferris State	Rushing	Markel King	9 rushes, 63 yards
Ferris State	Receiving	Emari O'Brien	4 receptions, 85 yards

=== At American International ===
	1	2	3	4	Total
No. 5 Bulldogs	35	21	14	14	84
Yellow Jackets	0	0	7	0	7

Statistics	FSU	AIC
First downs	33	10
Total yards	744	110
Rushing yards	486	-18
Passing yards	258	128
Turnovers	4	4
Time of possession	31:09	28:51

Team	Category	Player	Statistics
Ferris State	Passing	Trinidad Chambliss	14/24, 166 yards, 2 TD
Ferris State	Rushing	James Coby	12 rushes, 110 yards, TD
Ferris State	Receiving	Emari O'Brien	2 receptions, 93 yards, TD
American International	Passing	Lukas Kasko	15/29, 128 yards, TD, INT
American International	Rushing	Jadye Foxworth	5 rushes, 12 yards
American International	Receiving	Amiyn Hanks	4 receptions, 35 yards

=== Roosevelt ===
	1	2	3	4	Total
Lakers	0	10	3	0	13
No. 5 Bulldogs	7	21	14	13	55

Statistics	RUL	FSU
First downs	18	25
Total yards	270	448
Rushing yards	90	212
Passing yards	180	236
Turnovers	3	1
Time of possession	35:34	24:26

Team	Category	Player	Statistics
Roosevelt	Passing	Carson Budke	21/35, 180 yards, 3 INT
Roosevelt	Rushing	Cyrus Zuell	22 rushes, 78 yards
Roosevelt	Receiving	Keonta Nixon	5 receptions, 82 yards
Ferris State	Passing	Trinidad Chambliss	18/30, 224 yards, 3 TD
Ferris State	Rushing	Kannon Katzer	8 rushes, 69 yards
Ferris State	Receiving	Kannon Katzer	4 receptions, 83 yards, TD

=== At Wayne State (MI) ===
	1	2	3	4	Total
No. 4 Bulldogs	3	14	7	3	27
Warriors	0	0	14	0	14

Statistics	FSU	WSU
First downs	24	18
Total yards	505	234
Rushing yards	275	103
Passing yards	230	131
Turnovers	1	3
Time of possession	31:37	28:23

Team	Category	Player	Statistics
Ferris State	Passing	Trinidad Chambliss	21/37, 211 yards, TD, INT
Ferris State	Rushing	Trinidad Chambliss	16 rushes, 148 yards, TD
Ferris State	Receiving	Cam Underwood	2 receptions, 58 yards
Wayne State	Passing	Champion Edwards	15/27, 131 yards, TD, 3 INT
Wayne State	Rushing	D'Marco Singleton	15 rushes, 46 yards, TD
Wayne State	Receiving	Myles McKatherine	6 receptions, 70 yards, TD

=== Michigan Tech ===
	1	2	3	4	Total
Huskies	0	13	0	0	13
No. 4 Bulldogs	20	10	14	7	51

Statistics	MTU	FSU
First downs	18	23
Total yards	269	577
Rushing yards	91	178
Passing yards	178	399
Turnovers	0	1
Time of possession	33:37	26:23

Team	Category	Player	Statistics
Michigan Tech	Passing	Alex Fries	20/46, 158 yards, TD
Michigan Tech	Rushing	Jake Rueff	6 rushes, 42 yards
Michigan Tech	Receiving	Darius Willis	10 receptions, 68 yards, TD
Ferris State	Passing	Trinidad Chambliss	18/30, 383 yards, 6 TD
Ferris State	Rushing	Trinidad Chambliss	10 rushes, 90 yards
Ferris State	Receiving	Emari O'Brien	5 receptions, 144 yards, 2 TD

=== At No. 1 Grand Valley State ===
	1	2	3	4	Total
No. 3 Bulldogs	3	10	14	7	34
No. 1 Lakers	0	0	7	0	7

Statistics	FSU	GVSU
First downs	18	14
Total yards	363	229
Rushing yards	249	155
Passing yards	114	74
Turnovers	0	3
Time of possession	34:33	25:27

Team	Category	Player	Statistics
Ferris State	Passing	Trinidad Chambliss	11/19, 114 yards
Ferris State	Rushing	Trinidad Chambliss	22 rushes, 122 yards, 3 TD
Ferris State	Receiving	Emari O'Brien	3 receptions, 42 yards
Grand Valley State	Passing	Avery Moore	2/6, 49 yards, INT
Grand Valley State	Rushing	Cody Tierney	2 rushes, 52 yards, TD
Grand Valley State	Receiving	Darrell Johnson	3 receptions, 37 yards

=== At Northern Michigan ===
	1	2	3	4	Total
No. 2 Bulldogs	7	20	21	7	55
Wildcats	0	2	0	7	9

Statistics	FSU	NMU
First downs	20	10
Total yards	507	246
Rushing yards	325	122
Passing yards	182	124
Turnovers	1	2
Time of possession	29:20	30:40

Team	Category	Player	Statistics
Ferris State	Passing	Trinidad Chambliss	7/15, 141 yards
Ferris State	Rushing	Kannon Katzer	5 rushes, 126 yards, TD
Ferris State	Receiving	Taariik Brett	1 reception, 53 yards
Northern Michigan	Passing	Jake Bilitz	2/8, 105 yards, TD
Northern Michigan	Rushing	Jahi Wood	15 rushes, 48 yards
Northern Michigan	Receiving	Michael Love	2 receptions, 92 yards, TD

=== Saginaw Valley State ===
	1	2	3	4	Total
Cardinals	7	10	7	0	24
No. 2 Bulldogs	7	13	7	0	27

Statistics	SVSU	FSU
First downs	13	21
Total yards	292	388
Rushing yards	105	171
Passing yards	187	217
Turnovers	0	2
Time of possession	29:42	30:18

Team	Category	Player	Statistics
Saginaw Valley State	Passing	Mason McKenzie	11/24, 187 yards, TD
Saginaw Valley State	Rushing	Mason McKenzie	18 rushes, 90 yards, TD
Saginaw Valley State	Receiving	Joseph Walker	3 receptions, 74 yards, TD
Ferris State	Passing	Trinidad Chambliss	14/28, 159 yards, TD, INT
Ferris State	Rushing	Trinidad Chambliss	15 rushes, 87 yards, TD
Ferris State	Receiving	James Gilbert	3 receptions, 60 yards, TD

=== Davenport ===
	1	2	3	4	Total
Panthers	3	6	0	0	9
No. 2 Bulldogs	0	7	7	10	24

Statistics	DAV	FSU
First downs	24	20
Total yards	307	362
Rushing yards	137	228
Passing yards	170	134
Turnovers	1	1
Time of possession	32:06	27:54

Team	Category	Player	Statistics
Davenport	Passing	Mac VandenHout	19/33, 170 yards, INT
Davenport	Rushing	Kendall Williams	9 rushes, 56 yards
Davenport	Receiving	Hakeem Harris	5 receptions, 56 yards
Ferris State	Passing	Trinidad Chambliss	13/20, 116 yards, TD, INT
Ferris State	Rushing	Kannon Katzer	10 rushes, 88 yards, TD
Ferris State	Receiving	Brady Rose	4 receptions, 56 yards, TD

=== No. 8 Central Oklahoma (NCAA Division II Second Round) ===
	1	2	3	4	Total
No. 8 Bronchos	7	10	0	0	17
No. 2 Bulldogs	7	34	28	9	78

Statistics	UCO	FSU
First downs	19	26
Total yards	442	688
Rushing yards	207	485
Passing yards	234	203
Turnovers	4	1
Time of possession	31:15	28:45

Team	Category	Player	Statistics
Central Oklahoma	Passing	Jett Huff	9/14, 146 yards, TD, INT
Central Oklahoma	Rushing	William Mason	14 rushes, 86 yards
Central Oklahoma	Receiving	Jacob Delso	3 receptions, 66 yards
Ferris State	Passing	Trinidad Chambliss	9/18, 203 yards, TD
Ferris State	Rushing	Kannon Katzer	12 rushes, 200 yards, 3 TD
Ferris State	Receiving	James Gilbert	3 receptions, 105 yards

=== No. 4 Harding (NCAA Division II Quarterfinal) ===
	1	2	3	4	Total
No. 4 Bisons	0	0	0	7	7
No. 2 Bulldogs	13	7	14	7	41

Statistics	HAR	FSU
First downs	11	24
Total yards	193	452
Rushing yards	130	287
Passing yards	63	165
Turnovers	2	0
Time of possession	28:13	31:47

Team	Category	Player	Statistics
Harding	Passing	Cole Keylon	5/7, 63 yards, INT
Harding	Rushing	Blake Delacruz	10 rushes, 43 yards
Harding	Receiving	Dane Romberger	2 receptions, 36 yards
Ferris State	Passing	Trinidad Chambliss	18/27, 145 yards, 2 TD
Ferris State	Rushing	Taariik Brett	3 rushes, 89 yards
Ferris State	Receiving	Brady Rose	7 receptions, 45 yards

=== No. 11 Slippery Rock (NCAA Division II Semifinal) ===
	1	2	3	4	Total
No. 11 Slippery Rock	21	17	0	0	38
No. 2 Bulldogs	7	20	7	14	48

Statistics	SR	FSU
First downs	23	20
Total yards	453	513
Rushing yards	55	292
Passing yards	398	221
Turnovers	4	3
Time of possession	41:29	19:52

Team	Category	Player	Statistics
Slippery Rock	Passing	Brayden Long	27/48, 398 yards, 3 TD, 4 INT
Slippery Rock	Rushing	Idris Lawrence	19 rushes, 71 yards, TD
Slippery Rock	Receiving	Logan Ramper	8 receptions, 171 yards, 3 TD
Ferris State	Passing	Trinidad Chambliss	19/26, 221 yards, TD, INT
Ferris State	Rushing	Kannon Katzer	13 rushes, 165 yards, TD
Ferris State	Receiving	James Gilbert	6 receptions, 95 yards

=== Vs. No. 1 Valdosta State (NCAA Division II National Championship Game) ===
	1	2	3	4	Total
No. 2 Bulldogs	14	14	14	7	49
No. 1 Blazers	0	7	7	0	14

Statistics	FSU	VSU
First downs	21	19
Total yards	465	311
Rushing yards	251	121
Passing yards	214	190
Turnovers	0	1
Time of possession	29:15	30:45

Team	Category	Player	Statistics
Ferris State	Passing	Trinidad Chambliss	11/20, 153 yards, 3 TD
Ferris State	Rushing	Kannon Katzer	14 rushes, 97 yards
Ferris State	Receiving	Cam Underwood	3 receptions, 86 yards, 2 TD
Valdosta State	Passing	Sammy Edwards	25/42, 190 yards, 2 TD
Valdosta State	Rushing	Alfonso Franklin	14 rushes, 102 yards
Valdosta State	Receiving	Tyler Ajiero	5 receptions, 57 yards, TD

== Roster ==
2024 Ferris State Bulldogs football team roster
Players
Coaches
Offense

Pos.	#	Name	Class
WR	0	Jeremiah Lee	Jr
WR	1	Emari O'Brien	Sr
WR	2	Tyrese Hunt-Thompson	Sr
RB	3	Zamir Knighten	Jr
QB	4	Trinidad Chambliss	Jr
WR	5	Jeremiah Housey	Jr
WR	6	James Gilbert	Sr
RB	7	Zak Ahern	So
RB	8	Markel King	So
WR	9	Cam Underwood	Jr
WR	10	Taariik Brett	So
WR	11	Darian Kruja	Jr
QB	12	Carson Gulker	Jr
WR	13	Tyren Mason	Jr
QB	14	Chase Carter	Fr
QB	16	Leeshaun Mumpfield	Fr
QB	17	Charlie Spencer	So
QB	18	Jack Schierholz	Fr
QB	19	Demir Ashiru	Fr
RB	20	James Coby	Jr
WR	21	Jaylen Vinton	Fr
WR	22	Brady Rose	Jr
WR	23	Jashawn Johnson	So
RB	30	Kannon Katzer	Jr
WR	31	Samuel Watts	Jr
TE	43	Cam Orr	Jr
OL	50	Chimdindu Obi	So
OL	51	D'jaun Gilbert	Fr
OL	52	Jarvis Windham	Jr
OL	55	Elmir Jakupovic	Jr
OL	56	Ben Przytula	Fr
OL	64	Cam Heiss	So
OL	69	A. J. Polley	Jr
OL	70	Andrew DeVries	So
OL	71	Thomas Hubbard	So
OL	72	Tim Anderson	Jr
OL	73	Mack Bontekoe	Fr
OL	74	Bob Anderson	Jr
OL	75	Dayne Arnett	So
OL	76	Lawrence Hattar	Jr
OL	77	Travis Miracle	Sr
OL	79	Bryce George	Jr
TE	80	Braeden Childress	Sr
WR	81	Tae Boyd	Fr
WR	82	T. J. McKenzie	Sr
WR	83	Jaylin Townsend	Fr
TE	84	Mason Dykstra	Fr
WR	89	Timothy Ormond II	Fr
WR		Tarick Bower	Fr
QB		Wyatt Bower	Fr
OL		Kaharri Caldwell	Fr
OL		Martaz Charles	Fr
RB		Key'Vell Cooper	Fr
WR		Tyler Davis	Fr
WR		Jawon Jarrett	Fr
OL		Matthew Misch	Fr
WR		Dakari Neely	Fr
RB		Jake Price	Fr
RB		Colby Reed	Fr
OL		Ryan Ross	Fr
WR		Kevin Simes	Fr
WR		Deion Small	Jr
WR		Larenz Smith	Fr
WR		Glenn Smith II	Fr
OL		Jaylen Washington	Fr

Defense

Pos.	#	Name	Class
DB	0	Jacarvis Alexandre	Sr
DB	1	Lento Smith	Sr
DE	2	Sheldon Cage	Sr
LB	3	Iosefa Saipaia	Jr
DB	4	Justin Payoute	Jr
LB	5	Jason Williams	Sr
LB	6	Konnor Near	Sr
DB	7	Gyasi Mattison	Jr
DB	8	Payton Hughes	Sr
DL	9	Victor Nelson	Sr
DL	10	Ralph Carter	Sr
DL	11	Tyrone Fowler	Sr
DB	12	Michael Edwards	So
DB	13	Eric Jackson	So
DB	14	Tyler Greene	So
DB	16	Tre' Rigby	Fr
DB	17	Caleb Smith	Sr
DB	18	Mervens Jean Pierre	Jr
DL	19	Arnold Saidov	Sr
DB	20	Dwight Bush	Fr
DB	20	Zyon Pressley	Fr
DL	21	Tim Allen	So
DB	22	Ahlston Ware	Fr
DB	24	Edward Kofuma-Henry	Jr
DB	25	Lamont Gordon	Fr
LB	25	Ben Sporman	Fr
DB	26	Colby Brown	Jr
DB	27	Kyle Johnson	So
DB	29	Bry'Shaun Haskin	So
LB	33	Christian Cramer	Fr
DL	34	Stanley Lambert	Sr
LB	35	Jerek Fields	Fr
LB	40	Jake MacPhee	Fr
DL	41	Derrick Matlock II	Fr
DB	42	Jalen Jones	Jr
DL	44	Kailib Davis	Jr
DB	46	Joshua Beasley	Fr
DB	47	Chase Nixon	Jr
DL	48	Toby MacPhee	Jr
DL	49	Gabe Blanchard	Fr
DL	53	Gabe Smith-VerWys	Sr
DL	54	Noah Kindle	Jr
LB	57	Derek Anderson	Fr
LB	65	Sawyer TenHaaf	Fr
DL	68	Jordan Tooles	So
DL	90	Royce Daugherty	Fr
DL	91	Deron Irving-Bey	Sr
DL	92	Cam Post	Fr
DL	94	Alefosio Saipaia	Sr
DL	97	Jvonne Ruffin	Jr
DL	98	Jake Plamondon	Jr
DL	99	Markee Jones	So
LB		Ryan Ahern	Fr
LB		Michael Bush	Fr
LB		Isaiah Byars	Sr
LB		Brandon Cunningham	Fr
DB		DeWayne Dickerson	Fr
LB		Jaden Edington	Fr
DB		D'Mari Jenkins	Fr
DB		Jalen Johnson	Fr
DL		Zach Kelly	Fr
DB		Jalen McFadden	Fr
DE		Ed Noble	Fr
DE		Cooper Nye	Fr
DE		Kaleb Parrish	Fr
DB		Anthony Perdue	Fr
DB		Quentin Pope	Fr
DE		Tyrin Randle	Fr
DB		James Robinson	Fr
DB		Javen Sewell	Fr
DE		Devon Strobel	Fr
DB		Kelby Tyre	Fr

Special teams

Pos.	#	Name	Class
K, P	32	Levi Tuinstra	Jr
P	34	Ethan Sossen	Sr
LS	38	Sam Wahlberg	So
K, P	45	Mitchell Middleton	Jr
K		Gabe Long	Fr

Head coach

- Tony Annese

Coordinators/assistant coaches

- Brian Rock
  Assistant head coach/quarterbacks
- Steve Annese
  Offensive coordinator/wide receivers
- Ryan Hodges
  Defensive coordinator/strong safeties
- Tony Annese II
  Co-defensive coordinator/defensive pass game coordinator/defensive backs
- Tesfa Smith
  Defensive run game coordinator/defensive line
- Sam Parker
  Run game coordinator/offensive line
- Grant Caserta
  Linebackers/recruiting coordinator

Legend

- (C) Team captain
- (S) Suspended
- (I) Ineligible
- Injured
- Redshirt

Roster
Last update: December 28, 2024
