= 2024 NCAA Division II Football Championship Game =

Postseason college football game

2024 NCAA Division II Football Championship
Ferris State Bulldogs	Valdosta State Blazers
(13–1)	(13–0)
GLIAC	GSC
49	14
Head coach: Tony Annese	Head coach: Tremaine Jackson
Seed 2	Seed 1
	1	2	3	4	Total
Ferris State	14	14	14	7	49
Valdosta State	0	7	7	0	14
- Date: December 21, 2024
- Season: 2024
- Stadium: McKinney ISD Stadium
- Location: McKinney, Texas
- Referee: Dwight Neibling (MIAA)
- Attendance: 3,228

United States TV coverage
- Network: ESPN2/ESPN+

International TV coverage
- Network: Canada: TSN+

The 2024 NCAA Division II Football Championship Game was a college football game played on December 21, 2024, at McKinney ISD Stadium in McKinney, Texas. The game determined the national champion of NCAA Division II for the 2024 season. The game was scheduled to begin at 1:00 p.m. CST and aired on ESPN2 and ESPN+.

The game featured the two finalists of the 28-team playoff bracket, which began on November 23, 2024. The two-seed Ferris State Bulldogs from the Great Lakes Intercollegiate Athletic Conference (GLIAC) defeated the top-seeded Valdosta State Blazers from the Gulf South Conference (GSC), 49–14. The win gave the Ferris State football program its third national championship.

== Teams ==
The participants of the 2024 NCAA Division II Football Championship Game were the finalists of the 2024 Division II Playoffs, which began on November 23 with four 7-team brackets to determine super region champions, who then qualified for the national semifinals.

=== National semifinals ===
Super region champions were reseeded 1 to 4 for the national semifinals.

Semifinals; December 14, 2024; Hosted by higher seeded team USA: ESPN+ Canada: TSN+
1	Valdosta State	35
4	Minnesota State	21
3	Slippery Rock	38
2	Ferris State	48

Championship; December 21, 2024; McKinney ISD Stadium; McKinney, Texas; USA: ESPN2/ESPN+ Canada: TSN+
1	Valdosta State	14
2	Ferris State	49

== Game summary ==
2024 NCAA Division II Football Championship Game

Quarter	1	2	3	4	Total
No. 2 Ferris State	14	14	14	7	49
No. 1 Valdosta State	0	7	7	0	14

at McKinney ISD Stadium • McKinney, Texas

- Date: Saturday, December 21, 2024
- Game time: 1:00 p.m. CST
- Game weather: Sunny, 50 °F (10 °C)
- Game attendance: 3,228
- Referee: Dwight Neibling
- TV: ESPN2/ESPN+

Game information
First quarter
- FSU – Trinidad Chambliss 1-yard run (Mitchell Middleton kick), 7:22. Bulldogs 7–0. Drive: 9 plays, 81 yards, 4:48.
- FSU – Cam Underwood 61-yard pass from Trinidad Chambliss (Mitchell Middleton kick), 3:51. Bulldogs 14–0. Drive: 3 plays, 76 yards, 1:29.

Second quarter

- FSU – Kannon Keltzer 30-yard pass from Trinidad Chambliss (Mitchell Middleton kick), 12:39. Bulldogs 21–0. Drive: 4 plays, 67 yards, 2:09.
- VSU – Tyler Ajiero 38-yard pass from Sammy Edwards (Austin McKay kick), 1:49. Bulldogs 21–7. Drive: 7 plays, 53 yards, 2:08.
- FSU – Emari O'Brien 32-yard pass from Trinidad Chambliss (Mitchell Middleton kick), 0:10. Bulldogs 28–7. Drive: 9 plays, 66 yards, 1:08.

Third quarter

- FSU – Trinidad Chambliss 5-yard run (Mitchell Middleton kick), 11:15. Bulldogs 35–7. Drive: 8 plays, 63 yards, 3:45.
- VSU – Blake Hester 6-yard pass from Sammy Edwards (Austin McKay kick), 7:02. Bulldogs 35–14. Drive: 9 plays, 71 yards, 4:13.
- FSU – Tyrone Fowler 16-yard fumble return (Mitchell Middleton kick), 3:53. Bulldogs 42–14.

Fourth quarter

- FSU – Cam Underwood 9-yard pass from Trinidad Chambliss (Mitchell Middleton kick), 13:41. Bulldogs 49–14. Drive: 8 plays, 65 yards, 3:12.

=== Statistics ===
Statistics	FSU	VSU
First downs	21	19
Plays–yards	64–468	76–389
Rushes–yards	41–251	34–121
Passing yards	214	190
Passing: comp–att–int	14–23–0	25–42–0
Time of possession	29:15	30:45

Team	Category	Player	Statistics
Ferris State	Passing	Trinidad Chambliss	11/20, 153 yards, 3 TD
Ferris State	Rushing	Kannon Katzer	14 rushes, 97 yards
Ferris State	Receiving	Cam Underwood	3 receptions, 86 yards, 2 TD
Valdosta State	Passing	Sammy Edwards	25/42, 190 yards, 2 TD
Valdosta State	Rushing	Alfonso Franklin	14 rushes, 102 yards
Valdosta State	Receiving	Tyler Ajiero	5 receptions, 57 yards, TD
