= Tremaine Jackson =

American football coach (born 1983)

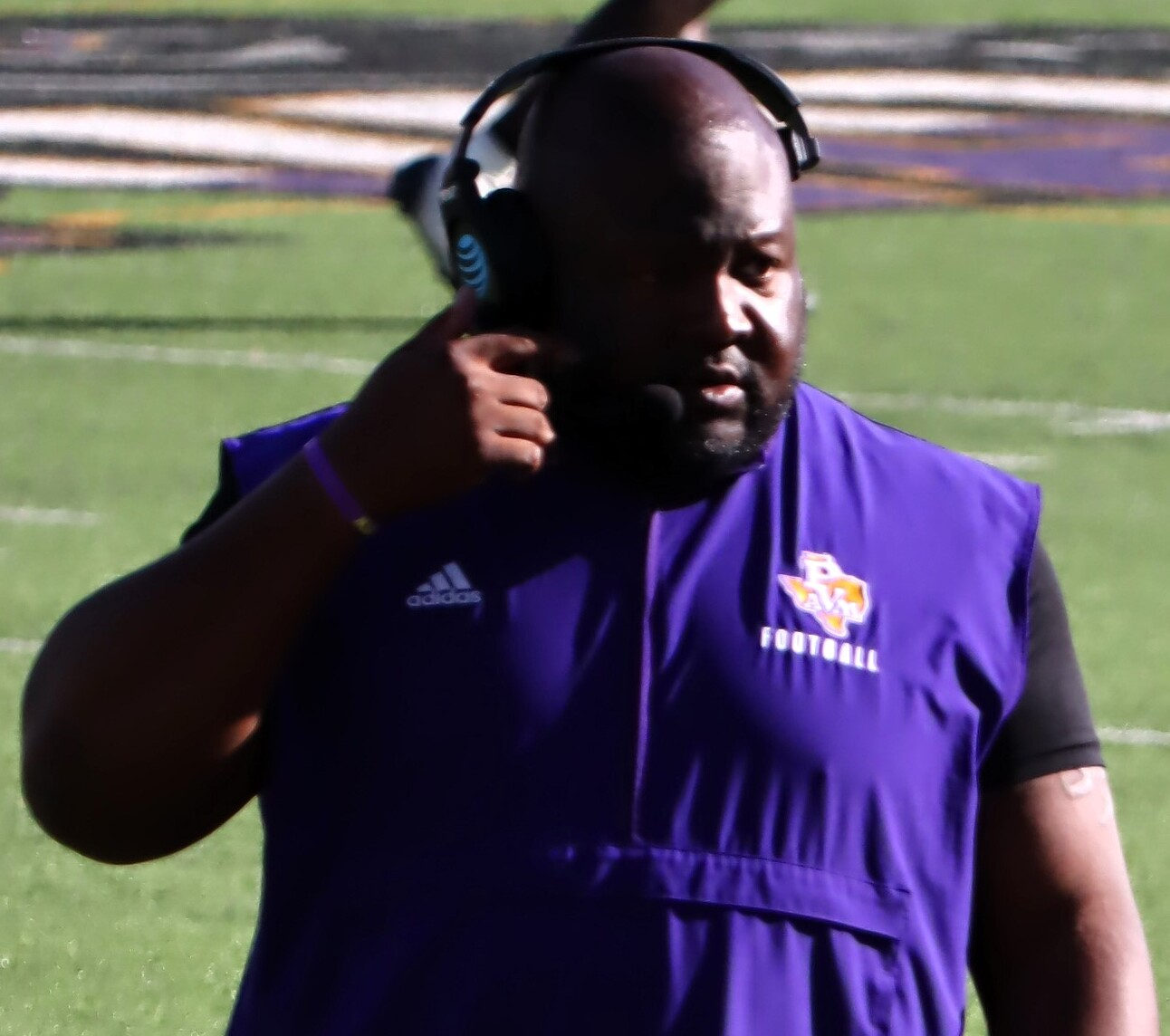
- Jackson with Prairie View A&M in 2025

Current position
- Title: Head coach
- Team: Prairie View A&M
- Conference: SWAC
- Record: 17–9

Biographical details
- Born: August 30, 1983 (age 43); Houston, Texas, U.S.
- Education: University of Houston (2006)

Playing career
- 2002–2003: Texas Southern
- 2004–2005: Louisiana–Monroe
- Position: Defensive tackle

Coaching career (HC unless noted)
- 2006: Texas A&M–Kingsville (DL)
- 2007: Trinity Valley (DL)
- 2008: Texas Southern (TE)
- 2009–2010: Texas Southern (DL)
- 2011: Texas Southern (DC)
- 2012: Evangel (DC/DL)
- 2013: Sioux Falls (DL)
- 2014–2016: Sioux Falls (DC)
- 2017–2018: Abilene Christian (DC)
- 2019: Texas State (DL)
- 2020–2021: Colorado Mesa
- 2022–2024: Valdosta State
- 2025–present: Prairie View A&M

Head coaching record
- Overall: 57–21
- Bowls: 0–1
- Tournaments: 5–2 (NCAA D-II playoffs)

Accomplishments and honors

Championships
- 2 GSC (2023, 2024); 2 SWAC West Division (2025, 2026); SWAC (2025)

Tremaine Jackson (born August 30, 1983) is an American college football coach. He is the head football coach for Prairie View A&M University, a position he has held since 2025. He previously was the head football coach for Colorado Mesa University from 2020 to 2021 and Valdosta State University from 2022 to 2024. He also coached for Texas A&M–Kingsville, Trinity Valley Community College, Texas Southern, Evangel, Sioux Falls, Abilene Christian, and Texas State. He played college football for Texas Southern and Louisiana–Monroe as a defensive tackle.

== Head coaching record ==
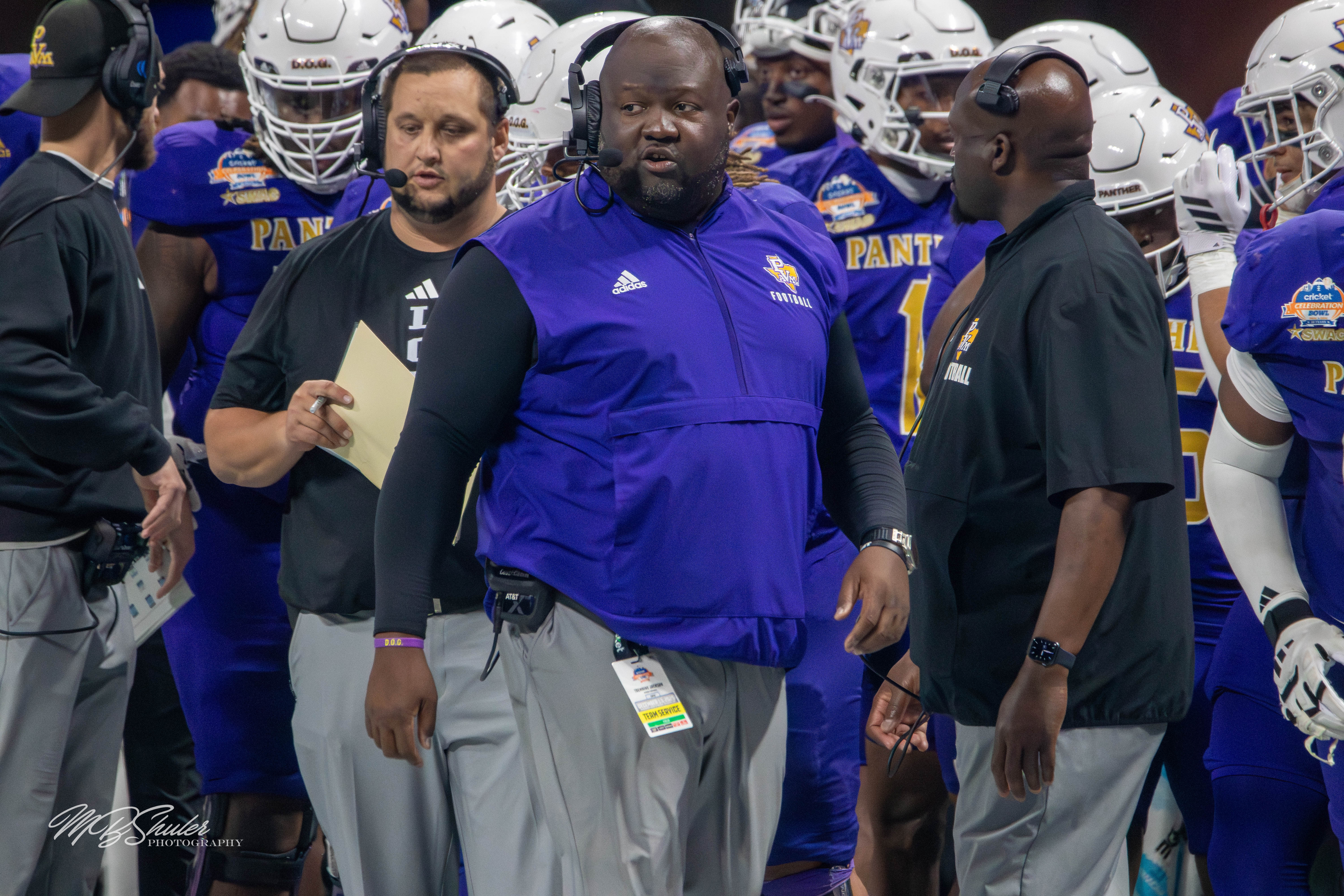
Tremaine Jackson at the 2025 Celebration Bowl

Year	Team	Overall	Conference	Standing	Bowl/playoffs	AFCA^{#}	D2^{°}
Colorado Mesa Mavericks (Rocky Mountain Athletic Conference) (2020–2021)
2020–21	Colorado Mesa	2–1	0–0	N/A			
2021	Colorado Mesa	8–2	7–2	3rd			
Colorado Mesa:		10–3	7–2				
Valdosta State Blazers (Gulf South Conference) (2022–2024)
2022	Valdosta State	5–6	2–5	T–7th			
2023	Valdosta State	12–2	7–1	T–1st	L NCAA Division II Quarterfinal	8	9
2024	Valdosta State	13–1	6–0	1st	L NCAA Division II Championship	2	2
Valdosta State:		30–9	15–6				
Prairie View A&M Panthers (Southwestern Athletic Conference) (2025–present)
2025	Prairie View A&M	10–4	7–1	1st (West)	L Celebration		
2026	Prairie View A&M	7–5	6–2	1st (West)			
Prairie View A&M:		17–9	13–3				
Total:		57–21					
National championship Conference title Conference division title or championship game berth
