= Trinidad Chambliss =

American football player (born 2002)

No. 6 – Ole Miss Rebels
- Position: Quarterback
- Class: Redshirt Senior

Personal information
- Born: August 24, 2002 (age 24)
- Listed height: 6 ft 0 in (1.83 m)
- Listed weight: 210 lb (95 kg)

Career information
- High school: Forest Hills Northern (Grand Rapids, Michigan)
- College: Ferris State (2021–2024); Ole Miss (2025–present)

Awards and highlights
- 2× Division II national champion (2022, 2024); Conerly Trophy (2025); SEC Newcomer of the Year (2025); Second-team All-SEC (2025); GLIAC Player of the Year (2024)
- Stats at ESPN

Trinidad Jay Chambliss (/tʃæmblɪs/; born August 24, 2002) is an American college football quarterback for the Ole Miss Rebels. He previously played for the Ferris State Bulldogs, leading the 2024 Bulldogs to the Division II national championship.

== Early life ==
Chambliss attended Forest Hills Northern High School in Grand Rapids, Michigan. As a senior, he threw for 1,610 yards and 17 touchdowns. After graduating high school, he committed to play college football at Ferris State University.

== College career ==
=== Ferris State ===
As a junior in 2024, Chambliss threw for 2,925 yards and 26 touchdowns and rushed for 1,019 yards and 25 touchdowns, leading Ferris State to a Division II national championship. In the national championship game against Valdosta State, he combined for five touchdowns in the 49–14 victory. As a result of his play, Chambliss was named the Great Lakes Intercollegiate Athletic Conference Player of the Year and a finalist for the Harlon Hill Trophy. Following the conclusion of the season, he entered the transfer portal.

=== Ole Miss ===
In April 2025, Chambliss announced his decision to transfer to the University of Mississippi to play for the Ole Miss Rebels. He entered the season as the backup to Austin Simmons. In the season opener against Georgia State, he completed four passes for 59 yards and a touchdown. Following an injury to Simmons, Chambliss was named the Rebels' starting quarterback against Arkansas. In his first start for Ole Miss, he combined for 415 total yards and three touchdowns in a 41–35 triumph over Arkansas. In the Egg Bowl against Mississippi State, Chambliss completed 23 passes for 359 yards and four touchdowns, leading the Rebels to a 38–19 victory and clinching a spot in the College Football Playoff. At the conclusion of the regular season, he was named the SEC Newcomer of the Year and recipient of the Conerly Trophy. In the first round of the playoffs against Tulane, Chambliss threw for 282 yards and combined for three total touchdowns in a win. In the 2026 Sugar Bowl, he completed 30 passes for a season-high 362 yards and two touchdowns, leading Ole Miss to a 39–34 upset victory in a rematch against Georgia; he was named the game's offensive MVP for his efforts.

In November 2025, Ole Miss filed a waiver request with the NCAA to allow Chambliss a sixth year of eligibility, as he did not play during his sophomore season at Ferris State in 2022 due to persistent respiratory issues. On January 9, 2026, the NCAA denied the request, ending his college eligibility. Ole Miss filed an appeal with the NCAA. On January 16, lawyers representing Chambliss sued the NCAA in Mississippi state court, seeking preliminary and permanent injunctions that would allow him to play an additional season. On February 5, 2026, Chambliss' appeal was rejected again. Following another appeal, a judge granted Chambliss an injunction on February 12, 2026, allowing him a sixth year of college eligibility.

Chambliss returned to Ole Miss in 2026 rather than enter the 2026 NFL draft. In the season opener, the Music City Kickoff against No. 24 Louisville, he threw for 336 yards, three touchdowns, and an interception while rushing for 60 yards and a touchdown. Against his former head coach Lane Kiffin and No. 7 LSU, Chambliss led the Rebels to a 32–24 victory, completing 33 passes for 363 yards and accounting for three touchdowns.

=== Statistics ===
Legend
**Bold**	Career High

Season	Team	Games			Passing								Rushing			
Season	Team	GP	GS	Record	Cmp	Att	Pct	Yds	Y/A	TD	Int	Rtg	Att	Yds	Avg	TD
2021	Ferris State	0	0	—	Redshirted (redshirt)											
2022	Ferris State	0	0	—	DNP											
2023	Ferris State	8	1	0–1	21	33	63.6	354	**10.7**	5	1	**197.7**	41	304	**7.4**	4
2024	Ferris State	15	15	**14–1**	226	367	61.6	2,925	8.0	**26**	6	148.6	**171**	**1,019**	6.0	**25**
2025	Ole Miss	15	13	11–2	**294**	**445**	66.1	**3,937**	8.8	22	3	155.4	133	527	4.0	8
2026	Ole Miss	9	9	6–3	207	330	**62.7**	2,359	7.1	18	**9**	134.9	57	187	3.3	7
Division II Career		23	16	14–2	247	400	61.8	3,279	8.2	31	7	152.7	212	1,323	6.2	29
Division I FBS Career		24	22	17-5	501	775	64.6	6,296	8.1	40	12	146.8	190	714	3.8	15

== Personal life ==
Chambliss is the son of Trent and Cheryl Chambliss. He is a Christian.

Chambliss' name was inspired by the Holy Trinity, as Trinidad is a Spanish word that translates to "Trinity" in English, and boxer Félix Trinidad, whom his father was a fan of. His name gained popularity among Ole Miss fans, who began to fly flags of Trinidad and Tobago at games and around Oxford.
