= 2023 NCAA Division II Football Championship Game =

Postseason college football game

2023 NCAA Division II Football Championship
Harding Bisons	Colorado Mines Orediggers
(15–0)	(15–0)
GAC	RMAC
38	7
Head coach: Paul Simmons	Head coach: Pete Sterbick
Seed 3	Seed 1
	1	2	3	4	Total
Harding	7	14	10	7	38
Colorado Mines	7	0	0	0	7
- Date: December 16, 2023
- Season: 2023
- Stadium: McKinney ISD Stadium
- Location: McKinney, Texas
- Attendance: 12,552

United States TV coverage
- Network: ESPNU

The 2023 NCAA Division II Football Championship Game was a college football game played on December 16, 2023, at McKinney ISD Stadium in McKinney, Texas. The game determined the national champion of NCAA Division II for the 2023 season. The game was scheduled to begin at 12:00 p.m. CST and was broadcast by ESPNU.

The game featured the two finalists of the 28-team playoff bracket, which began on November 18, 2022. The three-seed Harding Bisons from the Great American Conference (GAC) defeated the top-seeded Colorado Mines Orediggers from the Rocky Mountain Athletic Conference (RMAC), 38–7. The win gave the Harding football program its first national championship.

== Teams ==
The participants of the 2023 NCAA Division II Football Championship Game were the finalists of the 2023 Division II Playoffs, which began on November 18 with four 7-team brackets to determine super region champions, who then qualified for the national semifinals.

=== National semifinals ===
Super region champions were reseeded 1 to 4 for the national semifinals.

Semifinals; December 9, 2023; Hosted by higher seeded team
1	Colorado Mines	35
4	Kutztown	7
3	Lenoir–Rhyne	14
2	Harding	55

Championship; December 16, 2023; McKinney, Texas
1	Colorado Mines	7
2	Harding	38

== Game summary ==
2023 NCAA Division II Football Championship Game

Quarter	1	2	3	4	Total
No. 3 Harding	7	14	10	7	38
No. 1 Colorado Mines	7	0	0	0	7

at McKinney ISD Stadium • McKinney, Texas

- Date: Saturday, December 16, 2022
- Game time: 12:00 p.m. CST
- Game weather: Sunny, 53 °F (12 °C)
- Game attendance: 12,552
- Referee: Bryan Earl
- TV: ESPNU
- Box score, Recap

Scoring summary

Quarter	Time	Drive			Team	Scoring information	Score	
Quarter	Time	Plays	Yards	TOP	Team	Scoring information	Harding	Colorado Mines
1	9:06	11	75	5:54	Colorado Mines	Noah Roper 2-yard touchdown reception from John Matocha, Jacob Click kick good	0	7
1	3:49	9	75	5:14	Harding	Jhalen Spicer 10-yard touchdown run, Grant Ennis kick good	7	7
2	4:30	17	74	10:23	Harding	Braden Jay 10-yard touchdown run, Grant Ennis kick good	14	7
2	0:33	6	90	2:05	Harding	Braden Jay 9-yard touchdown run, Grant Ennis kick good	21	7
3	12:58	4	87	1:59	Harding	Braden Jay 73-yard touchdown run, Grant Ennis kick good	28	7
3	4:11	10	57	6:07	Harding	32-yard field goal by Grant Ennis	31	7
4	11:58	7	83	4:17	Harding	Braden Jay 73-yard touchdown run, Cole Keylon kick good	38	7
"TOP" = time of possession. For other American football terms, see Glossary of American football.							38	7

== Statistics ==
Team statistical comparison
Statistic	Harding	Colorado Mines
First downs	21	18
First downs rushing	20	5
First downs passing	1	12
First downs penalty	0	1
Third down efficiency	7–11	7–12
Fourth down efficiency	2–2	0–3
Total plays–net yards	60–563	54–344
Rushing attempts–net yards	58–502	21–71
Yards per rush	8.7	3.4
Yards passing	46	270
Pass completions–attempts	2–2	33–24
Interceptions thrown	0	1
Punt returns–total yards	0–0	0–0
Kickoff returns–total yards	2–17	1–3
Punts–average yardage	1–36.0	2–41.5
Fumbles–lost	0–0	1–0
Penalties–yards	2–17	2–20
Time of possession	36:10	23:50

Harding statistics
Bisons passing
	C–A	Yds	TD–INT
Cole Keylon	2–2	46	0–0
Team	2–2	46	0–0
Bisons rushing
	Car	Yds	TD
Blake Delacruz	27	212	0
Braden Jay	11	161	3
Omar Sinclair	6	74	0
Jhalen Spicer	3	23	1
Cole Keylon	7	20	1
Chauncey Martin	3	14	0
Team	58	502	5
Bisons receiving
	Rec	Yds	TD
Roland Wallace	2	46	0
Team	2	46	0

Colorado Mines statistics
Orediggers passing
	C–A	Yds	TD–INT
John Matocha	24–33	270	1–1
Team	24–33	270	1–1
Orediggers rushing
	Car	Yds	TD
Landon Walker	6	56	0
Noah Roper	3	9	0
John Matocha	11	5	0
Levi Johnson	1	1	0
Team	21	71	0
Orediggers receiving
	Rec	Yds	TD
Max McLeod	14	153	0
Flynn Schiele	2	58	0
Zach Hoffman	2	25	0
Nick Stone	2	12	0
Konnor Michelsen	1	10	0
Billy Pospisil III	1	5	0
Blake Smotherman	1	5	0
Noah Roper	1	2	1
Team	24	270	1
