= Grand Valley State Lakers football, 2020–present =

American college football season

2020–present Grand Valley State Lakers football
- Conference: Great Lakes Intercollegiate Athletic Conference
- Head coach: Matt Mitchell (2010–2019, 2021–2022); Scott Wooster (2023– )
- Home stadium: Lubbers Stadium

The Grand Valley State Lakers football program, 2020–present represented Grand Valley State University (GVSU) during the 2020s in NCAA Division II college football as a member of the Great Lakes Intercollegiate Athletic Conference (GLIAC). The team was led by head coaches Matt Mitchell (2010–2019, 2021–2022) and Scott Wooster (2023– ).

The team played its home games at Lubbers Stadium, named after former university president Arend Lubbers, located on GVSU's main campus in Allendale, Michigan.

== Decade overview ==
| Year | Head coach | Overall record | Conf. record | Conf. rank | Points scored | Points allowed | Delta | Postseason result | AFCA ranking |
|---|---|---|---|---|---|---|---|---|---|
| 2021 | Matt Mitchell | 10–2 | 6–1 | 2 | 456 | 223 | +233 | L, Division II second round | 7 |
| 2022 | Matt Mitchell | 12–1 | 6–0 | 1 | 493 | 145 | +348 | L, Division II quarterfinals | 7 |
| 2023 | Scott Wooster | 11–2 | 6–0 | 1 | 569 | 215 | +354 | L, Division II second round | 3 |
| 2024 | Scott Wooster | 11–2 | 6–1 | 2 | 384 | 208 | +176 | L, Division II second round | 6 |
| TOTAL | | – | | | | | | | |

== 2020 ==
The 2020 season was cancelled due to the COVID-19 pandemic.

== 2021 ==
2021 Grand Valley State Lakers football

NCAA Division II playoffs, second round, L 20–54 vs. Ferris State
- Conference: Great Lakes Intercollegiate Athletic Conference
- Record: 10–2 (6–1 GLIAC)
- Head coach: Matt Mitchell (11th season)

2021 Great Lakes Intercollegiate Athletic Conference football standings
| | Conf. | | | Overall |
| Team | W | | L | W | | L |
|---|---|---|---|---|---|---|
| No. 1 Ferris State $^ | 7 | – | 0 | 14 | – | 0 |
| No. 7 Grand Valley State ^ | 6 | – | 1 | 10 | – | 2 |
| Michigan Tech | 5 | – | 2 | 6 | – | 4 |
| Saginaw Valley State | 4 | – | 3 | 7 | – | 4 |
| Northern Michigan | 2 | – | 5 | 4 | – | 7 |
| Davenport | 2 | – | 5 | 3 | – | 8 |
| Wayne State (MI) | 2 | – | 5 | 2 | – | 9 |
| Northwood | 0 | – | 7 | 1 | – | 9 |
$ – Conference champion; ^ – NCAA Division II playoff participant; Rankings from AFCA Poll

The 2021 Grand Valley State Lakers football team represented Grand Valley State University as a member of the Great Lakes Intercollegiate Athletic Conference (GLIAC) during the 2021 NCAA Division II football season. In their 11th year under head coach Matt Mitchell, the Lakers compiled a 10–2 record (6–1 in conference games), finished second in the GLIAC, and outscored opponents by a total of 456 to 223. The Lakers lost twice to Ferris State, first in the regular season and then in the NCAA Division II playoffs. It was GVSU's 50th season of college football.

=== Schedule ===
| Date | Time | Opponent | Rank | Site | Result | Attendance | Source |
|---|---|---|---|---|---|---|---|
| September 4 | | Edinboro* | | Lubbers Stadium; Allendale, MI | Cancelled | | |
| September 11 | 7:00 p.m. | No. 19 CSU Pueblo* | No. 14 | Lubbers Stadium; Allendale, MI | W 34–14 | 11,472 | |
| September 18 | 3:00 p.m. | Wisconsin–La Crosse* | No. 10 | Lubbers Stadium; Allendale, MI | W 45–24 | 9,658 | |
| September 25 | 2:00 p.m. | at Michigan Tech | No. 9 | Sherman Field at Kearly Stadium; Houghton, MI | W 44–21 | 1,447 | |
| October 2 | 2:00 p.m. | at Saginaw Valley State | No. 8 | Wickes Stadium; University Center, MI (Battle of the Valleys) | W 49–17 | 8,544 | |
| October 9 | 7:00 p.m. | Northwood | No. 6 | Lubbers Stadium; Allendale, MI | W 70–9 | 15,254 | |
| October 16 | 7:00 p.m. | No. 3 Ferris State | No. 7 | Lubbers Stadium; Allendale, MI (Anchor–Bone Classic) | L 28–35 | 17,007 | |
| October 23 | 1:00 p.m. | at Northern Michigan | No. 8 | Superior Dome; Marquette, MI | W 28–24 | 2,012 | |
| October 30 | 3:00 p.m. | Michigan Tech^{†} | No. 8 | Lubbers Stadium; Allendale, MI | W 14–9 | 8,652 | |
| November 6 | 1:00 p.m. | at Wayne State (MI) | No. 7 | Tom Adams Field; Detroit, MI | W 62–13 | 2,436 | |
| November 13 | 1:00 p.m. | Davenport | No. 5 | Lubbers Stadium; Allendale, MI | W 42–0 | 8,483 | |
| November 20 | 1:00 p.m. | No. 22 Lindenwood* | No. 4 | Lubbers Stadium; Allendale, MI (NCAA Division II playoffs, first round) | W 20–3 | 5,808 | |
| November 27 | 1:00 p.m. | No. 1 Ferris State* | No. 4 | Top Taggart Field; Big Rapids, MI (NCAA Division II playoffs, second round) | L 20–54 | 3,742 | |
*Non-conference game; ^{†}Homecoming; Rankings from AFCA Poll released prior to the game; All times are in Eastern time

== 2022 ==
2022 Grand Valley State Lakers football

GLIAC champion

NCAA Division II Quarterfinal, L 21–24 vs. Ferris State
- Conference: Great Lakes Intercollegiate Athletic Conference

Ranking
- AFCA: No. 3
- Record: 12–1 (6–0 GLIAC)
- Head coach: Matt Mitchell (12th season)
- Offensive coordinator: Matt Vitzthum (3rd season)
- Defensive coordinator: Jim Louis (10th season)

2022 Great Lakes Intercollegiate Athletic Conference football standings
| | Conf. | | | Overall |
| Team | W | | L | W | | L |
|---|---|---|---|---|---|---|
| No. 3 Grand Valley State $^ | 6 | – | 0 | 12 | – | 1 |
| No. 1 Ferris State ^ | 5 | – | 1 | 14 | – | 1 |
| No. 20 Davenport ^ | 4 | – | 2 | 8 | – | 3 |
| Saginaw Valley State | 3 | – | 3 | 8 | – | 3 |
| Michigan Tech | 2 | – | 4 | 4 | – | 7 |
| Northern Michigan | 1 | – | 5 | 4 | – | 7 |
| Wayne State (MI) | 0 | – | 6 | 1 | – | 9 |
$ – Conference champion; ^ – NCAA Division II playoff participant; Rankings from AFCA Poll

The 2022 Grand Valley State Lakers football team represented Grand Valley State University as a member of the Great Lakes Intercollegiate Athletic Conference (GLIAC) during the 2022 NCAA Division II football season. In their 12th year under head coach Matt Mitchell, the Lakers compiled a 12–1 record (6–0 against conference opponents), won the GLIAC championship, and were ranked No. 1 nationally at the end of the regular season. The Lakers defeated five ranked teams during the regular season, including a 25–22 victory over No. 4 Colorado Mines in the season opener and rivalry game victories over No. 1 Ferris State and No. 17 Saginaw Valley State.

In the playoffs, the Lakers received a bye in the first round and won in the second round, before losing in the quarterfinals against rival Ferris State.

The team was led on offense by junior quarterback Cade Peterson. Peterson completed 159 of 273 passes for 2,439 yards with 16 touchdowns and four interceptions. Junior running back Tariq Reid was the team's leading rusher with 1,027 rushing yards and 19 touchdowns on 161 carries for an average of 6.4 yards per carry.

=== Schedule ===
| Date | Time | Opponent | Rank | Site | TV | Result | Attendance | Source |
|---|---|---|---|---|---|---|---|---|
| September 1 | 7:00 p.m. | No. 4 Colorado Mines* | No. 5 | Lubbers Stadium; Allendale, MI | FloSports | W 25–22 | 12,250 | |
| September 10 | 8:00 p.m. | at No. 21 CSU Pueblo* | No. 4 | Thunderbowl; Pueblo, CO | | W 35–10 | 5,990 | |
| September 17 | 7:00 p.m. | Lincoln (CA)* | No. 2 | Lubbers Stadium; Allendale, MI | FloSports | W 66–7 | 16,624 | |
| September 24 | 6:00 p.m. | at Wayne State (MI) | No. 2 | Adams Field; Detroit, MI | | W 48–9 | 4,338 | |
| October 1 | 7:00 p.m. | No. 17 Saginaw Valley State | No. 2 | Lubbers Stadium; Allendale, MI (Battle of the Valleys) | FloSports | W 29–10 | 14,877 | |
| October 8 | 12:00 p.m. | at American International* | No. 2 | Abdow Field; Springfield, MA | | W 45–3 | 1,019 | |
| October 15 | 1:00 p.m. | at No. 1 Ferris State | No. 2 | Top Taggart Stadium; Big Rapids, MI (Anchor–Bone Classic) | FloSports | W 22–21 | 12,661 | |
| October 22 | 1:00 p.m. | Northern Michigan^{†} | No. 1 | Lubbers Field; Allendale, MI | FloSports | W 56–3 | 11,812 | |
| October 29 | 1:00 p.m. | at Michigan Tech | No. 1 | Sherman Field at Kearly Stadium; Houghton, MI | FloSports | W 42–7 | 1,512 | |
| November 5 | 1:00 p.m. | Wayne State (MI) | No. 1 | Lubbers Stadium; Allendale, MI | FloSports | W 42–14 | 9,154 | |
| November 12 | 12:00 p.m. | at No. 18 Davenport | No. 1 | Farmers Insurance Complex; Caledonia, MI | FloSports | W 49–7 | 2,888 | |
| November 26 | 2:00 p.m. | No. 8 Northwest Missouri State* | No. 1 | Lubbers Stadium; Allendale, MI (NCAA Division II second round) | FloSports | W 13–8 | 4,049 | |
| December 3 | 1:00 p.m. | No. 5 Ferris State* | No. 1 | Lubbers Stadium; Allendale, MI (NCAA Division II quarterfinal) | | L 21–24 | 13,001 | |
*Non-conference game; ^{†}Homecoming; Rankings from AFCA Poll released prior to the game; All times are in Eastern time

=== Roster ===
- Anthony Cardamone, No. 48, linebacker, 6'2", 230 pounds, Macomb, Michigan
- Nyzier Fourqurean, No. 12, defensive back, 6'1", 185 pounds, Mentor, Ohio
- Jack Gilchrist, No. 92, defensive line, 6'2", 272 pounds, Mason, Michigan
- Trace Hrgich, No. 35, punter, redshirt freshman, 6'2", 163 pounds, Wheaton, Illinois
- Colton Hyble, No. 55, defensive end, junior, 6'5", 267 pounds, Mount Pleasant, Michigan
- Ian Kennelly, No. 20, defensive back, 6'2", 193 pounds, Macomb, Michigan
- Kollin Kralapp, No. 46, kicker, sophomore, 6'0", 180 pounds, Macomb, Michigan
- Christian McCarroll, No. 9, defensive line, 6'4", 260 pounds, Barberton, Ohio
- Damonte McCurdy, No. 32, defensive back, 5'9", 182 pounds, Birmingham, Michigan
- Luke McLean, No. 16, defensive back, 5'11", 183 pounds, Rockford, Michigan
- Avery Moore, No. 15, quarterback, sophomore, 6'2", 230 pounds, New Lothrop, Michigan
- Cade Peterson, No. 13, quarterback, junior, 6'4", 223 pounds, Maple City, Michigan
- Jack Provencher, No. 4, running back, senior, 5'11", 215 pounds, Shelby Township, Michigan
- Tariq Reid, No. 2, running back, junior, 6'0", 211 pounds, Davison, Michigan
- Terez Reid, No. 0, defensive back, redshirt freshman, 5'10", 175 pounds, Indianapolis
- Antonio Strong, No. 7, defensive back, 6'0", 199 pounds, Grand Rapids, Michigan
- Jay'viar Suggs, No. 90, defensive lineman, sophomore, 6'3", 299 pounds, Flint, Michigan
- Abe Swanson, No. 41, linebacker, 6'1", 222 pounds, St. Charles, Illinois
- Cody Tierney, No. 18 wide receiver, sophomore 5'10", 190 pounds, Grand Rapids, Michigan
- Jaylon Tillman, No. 8, wide receiver, sophomore, 6'0", 208 pounds, Plainfield, Illinois
- Jahdae Walker, No. 17, wide receiver, sophomore, 6'4", 185 pounds, Cleveland
- Damon Wesley, No. 1, linebacker, senior, 5'11", 225 pounds, Indianapolis

== 2023 ==
2023 Grand Valley State Lakers football

GLIAC champion

NCAA Division II quarterfinals, L 6–7 vs. Harding
- Conference: Great Lakes Intercollegiate Athletic Conference
- Record: 11–2 (6–0 GLIAC)
- Head coach: Scott Wooster (1st season)

2023 Great Lakes Intercollegiate Athletic Conference football standings
| | Conf. | | | Overall |
| Team | W | | L | W | | L |
|---|---|---|---|---|---|---|
| No. 3 Grand Valley State $^ | 6 | – | 0 | 11 | – | 2 |
| No. 9 Ferris State ^ | 5 | – | 1 | 8 | – | 3 |
| Davenport | 4 | – | 2 | 8 | – | 2 |
| Saginaw Valley State | 3 | – | 3 | 6 | – | 5 |
| Wayne State (MI) | 2 | – | 4 | 3 | – | 8 |
| Michigan Tech | 1 | – | 5 | 5 | – | 5 |
| Northern Michigan | 0 | – | 6 | 0 | – | 11 |
$ – Conference champion; ^ – NCAA Division II playoff participant; Rankings from AFCA poll

The 2023 Grand Valley State Lakers football team represented Grand Valley State University as a member of the Great Lakes Intercollegiate Athletic Conference (GLIAC) during the 2023 NCAA Division II football season. In their second year under head coach Scott Wooster, the Lakers compiled an 11–2 record (6–0 in conference games), won the GLIAC championship, and outscored opponents by a total of 569 to 215. The Lakers lost in the season opener to Colorado Mines and in the Division II quarterfinals to eventual national champion Harding.

The team's statistical leaders included:

- Quarterback Cade Peterson completed 151 of 241 passes (62.66%) for 2,116 yards, 20 touchdowns, eight interceptions, and a 157.16 quarterback efficiency rating.
- Running back Tariq Reid tallied 770 rushing yards on 154 carries for an average of 5.0 yards per carry. He also ranked second on the team in scoring with 90 points on 15 touchdowns.
- Wide receiver Cody Tierney tallied 35 receptions for 669 yards (19.11 yards per catch) and six touchdowns.
- Kicker Josh Gorball was the team's leading scorer with 103 points on 10 field goals and 73 extra point kicks.
- Abe Swanson led the team with 90 total tackles.

=== Schedule ===
| Date | Time | Opponent | Rank | Site | TV | Result | Attendance | Source |
|---|---|---|---|---|---|---|---|---|
| August 31 | 8:05 p.m. | at No. 2 Colorado Mines* | No. 3 | Marv Kay Stadium at Alumni Field; Golden, CO | | L 28–31 | 3,767 | |
| September 9 | 7:00 p.m. | No. 25 CSU Pueblo* | No. 7 | Lubbers Stadium; Allendale, MI | | W 57–49 ^{2OT} | 15,182 | |
| September 16 | 1:00 p.m. | No. 19 Assumption* | No. 6 | Lubbers Stadium; Allendale, MI | | W 43–7 | 15,844 | |
| September 30 | 6:00 p.m. | at Saginaw Valley State | No. 7 | Wickes Stadium; University Center, MI | | W 55–14 | 5,085 | |
| October 7 | 7:00 p.m. | Kentucky State* | No. 7 | Lubbers Stadium; Allendale, MI | | W 65–7 | 11,679 | |
| October 14 | 3:00 p.m. | No. 1 Ferris State | No. 7 | Lubbers Stadium; Allendale, MI (Anchor–Bone Classic) | FloSports | W 49–28 | 16,577 | |
| October 21 | 1:00 p.m. | at Northern Michigan | No. 4 | Superior Dome; Marquette, MI | | W 73–14 | 3,447 | |
| October 28 | 3:00 p.m. | Michigan Tech^{†} | No. 3 | Lubbers Stadium; Allendale, MI | FloSports | W 44–13 | 13,014 | |
| November 4 | 1:00 p.m. | at Wayne State (MI) | No. 3 | Tom Adams Field; Detroit, MI | | W 66–10 | 2,158 | |
| November 11 | 1:00 p.m. | No. 16 Davenport | No. 2–T | Lubbers Stadium; Allendale, MI | | W 38–0 | 10,259 | |
| November 18 | 1:00 p.m. | No. 4 Ferris State* | No. 2 | Lubbers Stadium; Allendale, MI (NCAA Division II playoffs) | | W 21–14 | 14,109 | |
| November 25 | 1:00 p.m. | No. 5 Pittsburg State* | No. 3 | Lubbers Stadium; Allendale, MI (NCAA Division II playoffs) | | W 24–21 | 4,218 | |
| December 2 | 2:00 p.m. | at No. 3 Harding* | No. 2 | First Security Stadium; Searcy, AR (NCAA Division II quarterfinals) | | L 6–7 | 3,100 | |
*Non-conference game; ^{†}Homecoming; Rankings from AFCA Poll released prior to the game; All times are in Eastern time

== 2024 ==
2024 Grand Valley State Lakers football

NCAA Division II playoffs, L 26–44 vs. Harding
- Conference: Great Lakes Intercollegiate Athletic Conference
- Record: 11–2 (6–1 GLIAC)
- Head coach: Scott Wooster (2nd season)
- Offensive coordinator: Ian Shoemaker (1st season)

2024 Great Lakes Intercollegiate Athletic Conference football standings
| | Conf. | | | Overall |
| Team | W | | L | W | | L |
|---|---|---|---|---|---|---|
| No. 1 Ferris State $^ | 7 | – | 0 | 14 | – | 1 |
| No. 6 Grand Valley State ^ | 6 | – | 1 | 11 | – | 2 |
| Davenport | 4 | – | 3 | 7 | – | 4 |
| Michigan Tech | 4 | – | 3 | 7 | – | 4 |
| Saginaw Valley State | 4 | – | 3 | 7 | – | 4 |
| Wayne State (MI) | 2 | – | 5 | 2 | – | 9 |
| Roosevelt* | 1 | – | 6 | 1 | – | 9 |
| Northern Michigan | 0 | – | 7 | 0 | – | 11 |
$ – Conference champion; ^ – NCAA Division II playoff participant; * – Roosevelt ineligible for postseason play due to transition from NAIA; Rankings from AFCA poll

The 2024 Grand Valley State Lakers football team represented Grand Valley State University as a member of the Great Lakes Intercollegiate Athletic Conference (GLIAC) during the 2024 NCAA Division II football season. In their second year under head coach Scott Wooster, the Lakers compiled an 11–2 record (6–1 in conference fames), finished second in the GLIAC, and outscored opponents by a total of 384 to 208. The Lakers lost in the regular season to Ferris State and in the Division II playoffs to Harding.

Quarterback duties were split between Avery Moore (72-of-129 for 1,007 yards) and Ike Udengwu (54-of-97 for 765 yards). Moore also tallied 538 rushing yards. Running back Khalil Eichelberger led the team with 789 rushing yards. Kicker Matthew Bacik was the leading scorer with 83 points (13 field goals and 44 extra points).

=== Schedule ===
| Date | Time | Opponent | Rank | Site | TV | Result | Attendance | Source |
|---|---|---|---|---|---|---|---|---|
| September 5 | 7:00 p.m. | Central State (OH)* | No. 4 | Lubbers Stadium; Allendale, MI | | W 58–0 | 13,678 | |
| September 14 | 10:00 p.m. | at No. 22 CSU Pueblo* | No. 3 | ThunderBowl; Pueblo, CO | | W 24–21 | 8,057 | |
| September 21 | 7:00 p.m. | No. 5 (NCAA D-III); Wisconsin–La Crosse* | No. 2 | Lubbers Stadium; Allendale, MI | FloSports | W 20–13 | 15,884 | |
| September 28 | 3:00 p.m. | West Florida* | No. 2 | Lubbers Stadium; Allendale, MI | | W 31–7 | 10,458 | |
| October 5 | 12:00 p.m. | at Davenport | No. 2 | Farmers Insurance Complex; Caledonia, MI | | W 24–7 | 2,102 | |
| October 12 | 7:00 p.m. | Northern Michigan | No. 2 | Lubbers Stadium; Allendale, MI | | W 49–17 | 7,002 | |
| October 19 | 3:00 p.m. | at Saginaw Valley State | No. 2 | Wickes Stadium; University Center, MI (Battle of the Valleys) | | W 16–9 | 8,586 | |
| October 26 | 3:00 p.m. | No. 3 Ferris State | No. 1 | Lubbers Stadium; Allendale, MI (Anchor–Bone Classic) | | L 7–34 | 16,332 | |
| November 2 | 3:00 p.m. | Wayne State (MI)^{†} | No. 7 | Lubbers Stadium; Allendale, MI | | W 51–28 | 10,377 | |
| November 9 | 12:00 p.m. | at Michigan Tech | No. 5 | Sherman Field at Kearly Stadium; Houghton, MI | FloSports | W 20–0 | 1,294 | |
| November 16 | 2:00 p.m. | at Roosevelt | No. 5 | Morris Field; Arlington Heights, IL | | W 34–21 | 986 | |
| November 23 | 1:00 p.m. | No. 14 Indianapolis* | No. 5 | Lubbers Stadium; Allendale, MI (NCAA Division II playoffs) | | W 24–7 | 3,948 | |
| November 30 | 1:00 p.m. | No. 4 Harding* | No. 5 | Lubbers Stadium; Allendale, MI (NCAA Division II playoffs) | | L 26–44 | 2,844 | |
*Non-conference game; ^{†}Homecoming; Rankings from AFCA Poll released prior to the game; All times are in Eastern time

== 2025 ==
2025 Grand Valley State Lakers football
- Conference: Great Lakes Intercollegiate Athletic Conference

Ranking
- AFCA: No. 21
- Record: 7–3 (5–2 GLIAC)
- Head coach: Scott Wooster (3rd season)
- Offensive coordinator: Ian Shoemaker (2nd season)

2025 Great Lakes Intercollegiate Athletic Conference football standings
| | Conf. | | | Overall |
| Team | W | | L | W | | L |
|---|---|---|---|---|---|---|
| No. 1 Ferris State $^ | 7 | – | 0 | 16 | – | 0 |
| Grand Valley State | 5 | – | 2 | 7 | – | 3 |
| Saginaw Valley State | 5 | – | 2 | 6 | – | 5 |
| Michigan Tech | 4 | – | 3 | 7 | – | 4 |
| Davenport | 4 | – | 3 | 5 | – | 5 |
| Northern Michigan | 2 | – | 5 | 3 | – | 8 |
| Roosevelt* | 1 | – | 6 | 2 | – | 8 |
| Wayne State (MI) | 0 | – | 7 | 0 | – | 11 |
$ – Conference champion; ^ – NCAA Division II playoff participant; * – Roosevelt ineligible for postseason play due to transition from NAIA; Rankings from AFCA poll

The 2025 Grand Valley State Lakers football team represents Grand Valley State University as a member of the Great Lakes Intercollegiate Athletic Conference (GLIAC) during the 2025 NCAA Division II football season. Scott Wooster is expected to lead the team in his third season as the Lakers' head coach.

=== Schedule ===
| Date | Time | Opponent | Rank | Site | TV | Result | Attendance | Source |
|---|---|---|---|---|---|---|---|---|
| August 30 | 1:00 p.m. | Lincoln (PA)* | No. 3 | Lubbers Stadium; Allendale, MI | | W 45–9 | 12,136 | |
| September 6 | 7:00 p.m. | Black Hills State* | No. 3 | Lubbers Stadium; Allendale, MI | | W 48–36 | 13,836 | |
| September 13 | 4:00 p.m. | at No. 24т Pittsburg State* | No. 3 | Carnie Smith Stadium; Pittsburg, KS | | L 14–17 | 8,350 | |
| October 4 | 4:00 p.m. | Davenport | No. 10 | Lubbers Stadium; Allendale, MI | FloSports | W 37–14 | 15,188 | |
| October 11 | 7:00 p.m. | at Northern Michigan | No. 8 | Superior Dome; Marquette, MI | FloSports | W 35–7 | 3,216 | |
| October 18 | 2:00 p.m. | Saginaw Valley State | No. 7 | Lubbers Stadium; Allendale, MI | FloSports | L 19–20 | 9,814 | |
| October 25 | 1:00 p.m. | at No. 1 Ferris State | No. 18 | Top Taggart Field; Big Rapids, MI (Anchor–Bone Classic) | FloSports | L 31–38 | 10,089 | |
| November 1 | 1:00 p.m. | at Wayne State (MI) | No. 25 | Tom Adams Field; Detroit, MI | FloSports | W 59–13 | 1,451 | |
| November 8 | 2:00 p.m. | Michigan Tech^{†} | No. 23 | Lubbers Stadium; Allendale, MI | FloSports | W 18–15 | 11,394 | |
| November 15 | 1:00 p.m. | Roosevelt | No. 21 | Lubbers Stadium; Allendale, MI | FloSports | W 69–13 | 6,244 | |
*Non-conference game; ^{†}Homecoming; Rankings from AFCA Poll released prior to the game; All times are in Eastern time
