= 2023 Central Missouri Mules football team =

American college football season

2023 Central Missouri Mules football

MIAA co-champion

NCAA Division II Second Round, L 34–35 vs. Harding
- Conference: Mid-America Intercollegiate Athletics Association

Ranking
- AFCA: No. 6
- Record: 11–2 (.846) (9–1 (.900) MIAA)
- Head coach: Josh Lamberson (2nd season)
- Co-offensive coordinators: Justin Bane (1st season); Joe Holtzclaw (1st season)
- Defensive coordinator: Greg Jones (1st season)
- Home stadium: Keiser Multi-Purpose Field

2023 Mid-America Intercollegiate Athletics Association football standings
	Conf.			Overall
Team	W		L	W		L
No. 6 Central Missouri +^	9	–	1	11	–	2
No. 5 Pittsburg State +^	9	–	1	11	–	2
Emporia State #	7	–	3	9	–	3
Missouri Western #	7	–	3	8	–	4
Fort Hays State	6	–	4	7	–	4
NW Missouri State	6	–	4	7	–	4
Central Oklahoma	4	–	6	5	–	6
Missouri Southern	4	–	6	5	–	6
Nebraska–Kearney	2	–	8	3	–	8
Washburn	1	–	9	2	–	9
Northeastern State	0	–	10	1	–	10
+ – Conference co-champions; ^ – NCAA Division II playoff participant; # – bowl participant (Emporia State: Heritage Bowl, Missouri Western: Live United Texarkana Bowl); Rankings from AFCA Poll

The 2023 Central Missouri Mules football team represented the University of Central Missouri as a member of the Mid-America Intercollegiate Athletics Association during the 2023 NCAA Division II football season. Led by 2nd-year head coach Josh Lamberson, the Mules compiled an overall record of 11–2 with a mark of 9–1 in conference play; sharing the MIAA championship.

Central Missouri beat Henderson State in the first round before losing to the eventual champions, Harding, in the second round. Central Missouri played home games at Audrey J. Walton Stadium in Warrensburg, Missouri.

Quarterback transfer Zach Zebrowski from Southern Illinois was named the Harlon Hill Trophy winner following the season.

== Schedule ==
Date	Time	Opponent	Rank	Site	Result	Attendance	Source
August 31	7:00 p.m.	at Missouri Western		Spratt Stadium; St. Joseph, MO	W 45–38		
September 9	1:00 p.m.	Central Oklahoma		Audrey J. Walton Stadium; Warrensburg, MO	W 41–17	7,381	
September 16	1:00 p.m.	No. 3 Pittsburg State		Audrey J. Walton Stadium; Warrensburg, MO	L 37–38	10,048	
September 23	1:00 p.m.	at Washburn	No. 25	Yager Stadium at Moore Bowl; Topeka, KS	W 58–28	5,785	
September 30	1:00 p.m.	Northwest Missouri State	No. 21	Audrey J. Walton Stadium; Warrensburg, MO	W 41–38	8,900	
October 7	1:00 p.m.	Nebraska–Kearney	No. 18	Audrey J. Walton Stadium; Warrensburg, MO	W 38–14	8,100	
October 14	2:00 p.m.	at Northeastern State	No. 17	Doc Wadley Stadium; Tahlequah, OK	W 63–24	3,180	
October 21	1:30 p.m.	No. 24 Emporia State	No. 16	Audrey J. Walton Stadium; Warrensburg, MO	W 77–27	12,102	
October 28	2:00 p.m.	at Missouri Southern	No. 15	Fred G. Hughes Stadium; Joplin, MO	W 42–21	1,012	
November 4	1:00 p.m.	Fort Hays State	No. 11	Audrey J. Walton Stadium; Warrensburg, MO	W 47–28	8,307	
November 11	12:00 p.m.	at Lincoln (MO)*	No. 7	Dwight T. Reed Stadium; Jefferson City, MO	W 63–27	1,032	
November 18	1:00 p.m.	No. 25 Henderson State*	No. 6	Audrey J. Walton Stadium; Warrensburg, MO (NCAA Division II First Round)	W 56–14	2,500	
November 25	1:00 p.m.	No. 3 Harding*	No. 6	First Security Stadium; Searcy, AR (NCAA Division II Second Round)	L 34–35	3,500	
*Non-conference game; Rankings from AFCA Poll released prior to the game; All times are in Eastern Standard time

== Coaching staff ==
Central Missouri Mules
Name	Position	Consecutive season at Central Missouri in current position	Previous position	UCM profile
Josh Lamberson	Head coach	2nd	Abilene Christian assistant head coach and offensive coordinator (2017–2021)	
Hayden Hawk	Assistant head coach and quarterbacks coach	1st	Henderson State offensive coordinator (2018–2022)	
Justin Bane	Co-offensive coordinator and wide receivers coach	1st	N/A	
Greg Jones	Defensive coordinator and safeties coach	1st	Oregon defensive analyst (2022)	
Stephen Franklin	Special teams coordinator and linebackers coach	1st	Bethel (MN) inside linebackers coach and special teams coordinator (2021–2022)	
Joe Holtzclaw	Co-offensive coordinator, run game coordinator, and offensive line coach	1st	Central Missouri offensive line coach (2022)	
Dana Chambers	Defensive line coach	7th	Kalamazoo Central HS (MI) head coach (2009–2016)	
Adrian Duncan	Running backs coach	N/A	N/A	
Brian Smith II	Cornerbacks coach	N/A	N/A	
Chace Gadapee	Tight ends coach	N/A	N/A	
Terrance Dennis	Assistant special teams coordinator, kickers coach, punters coach, and long snappers coach	N/A	N/A	
