= 2023 Harding Bisons football team =

American college football season

2023 Harding Bisons football

NCAA Division II national champion GAC champion

NCAA Division II Championship Game, W 38–7 vs. Colorado Mines
- Conference: Great American Conference

Ranking
- AFCA: No. 1
- Record: 15–0 (11–0 GAC)
- Head coach: Paul Simmons (7th season)
- Offensive scheme: Flexbone triple option
- Defensive coordinator: Roddy Mote (7th season)
- Co-defensive coordinator: Luke Tribble (7th season)
- Base defense: 3–4
- Home stadium: First Security Stadium

2023 Great American Conference football standings
	Conf.			Overall
Team	W		L	W		L
No. 1 Harding $^	11	–	0	15	–	0
No. 24 Henderson State ^	9	–	2	9	–	3
Ouachita Baptist	9	–	2	9	–	2
Southern Arkansas #	9	–	2	10	–	2
Oklahoma Baptist	6	–	5	6	–	5
Southern Nazarene #	6	–	5	6	–	6
Arkansas Tech	5	–	6	5	–	6
SE Oklahoma State	5	–	6	5	–	6
East Central	3	–	8	3	–	8
Arkansas–Monticello	2	–	9	2	–	9
NW Oklahoma State	1	–	10	1	–	10
SW Oklahoma State	0	–	11	0	–	11
$ – Conference champion; ^ – NCAA Division II playoff participant; # – bowl participant (Southern Nazarene: Heritage Bowl, Southern Arkansas: Live United Texarkana Bowl); Rankings from AFCA poll

The 2023 Harding Bisons football team was an American football team that represented Harding University in the Great American Conference (GAC) during the 2023 NCAA Division II football season. In their sixth year under head coach Paul Simmons, the team compiled a perfect 15–0 record (11–0 against conference opponents), outscored opponents by a total of 665 to 156, and won the GAC and NCAA Division II championships. The team also set an NCAA record for most rushing yards in a season with 6,161 rushing yards.

The team finished the regular season ranked No. 2 among Division II programs and advanced to the NCAA Division II playoffs where they received a bye in the first round and defeated No. 6 Central Missouri (35–34) in the second round, No. 2 Grand Valley State (7–6) in the quarterfinals, and No. 11 Lenoir–Rhyne (55–14) in the semifinals. Through the December 16 victory over Colorado Mines, the Bison have won 18 consecutive games, the longest winning streak in program history. Harding defeated No. 1 Colorado Mines in the Division II national championship game on December 16, 38–7, to win the school's first national championship.

Harding defensive end Nathaniel Wallace was selected as the 2023 GAC Defensive Player of the Year. Paul Simmons was selected as GAC Coach of the Year.

The team played its home games at First Security Stadium in Searcy, Arkansas.

== Schedule ==
Date	Time	Opponent	Rank	Site	Result	Attendance
August 31	6:00 p.m.	at Southern Nazarene	No. 14	SNU Stadium; Bethany, OK	W 53–20	1,754
September 9	7:00 p.m.	Oklahoma Baptist	No. 12	First Security Stadium; Searcy, AR	W 49–10	2,800
September 16	6:00 p.m.	Arkansas–Monticello	No. 11	First Security Stadium; Searcy, AR	W 59–19	3,100
September 23	6:30 p.m.	at No. 20 Henderson State	No. 10	Carpenter–Haygood Stadium; Arkadelphia, AR	W 27–16	6,013
September 30	6:00 p.m.	Southwestern Oklahoma State	No. 10	First Security Stadium; Searcy, AR	W 64–0	2,300
October 7	4:00 p.m.	at Northwestern Oklahoma State	No. 9	Ranger Field; Alva, OK	W 62–0	3,213
October 14	6:00 p.m.	No. 5 Ouachita Baptist	No. 9	First Security Stadium; Searcy, AR	W 41–10	5,600
October 21	2:00 p.m.	at Southern Arkansas	No. 6	Memorial Stadium; El Dorado, AR	W 54–20	1,196
October 28	2:00 p.m.	at Southeastern Oklahoma State	No. 4	Paul Laird Field; Durant, OK	W 55–0	1,178
November 4	3:00 p.m.	East Central^{†}	No. 4	First Security Stadium; Searcy, AR	W 48–7	5,500
November 11	2:00 p.m.	at Arkansas Tech	No. 3	Thone Stadium; Russellville, AR	W 56–0	2,347
November 25	1:00 p.m.	No. 6 Central Missouri*	No. 3	First Security Stadium; Searcy, AR (NCAA Division II Second Round)	W 35–34	3,500
December 2	1:00 p.m.	No. 2 Grand Valley State*	No. 3	First Security Stadium; Searcy, AR (NCAA Division II Quarterfinal)	W 7–6	3,100
December 9	11:00 a.m.	No. 11 Lenoir–Rhyne*	No. 3	First Security Stadium; Searcy, AR (NCAA Division II Semifinal)	W 55–14	2,900
December 16	12:00 p.m.	vs. No. 1 Colorado Mines*	No. 3	McKinney ISD Stadium; McKinney, TX (NCAA Division II Championship Game)	W 38–7	12,552
*Non-conference game; ^{†}Homecoming; Rankings from AFCA Poll released prior to the game; All times are in Central time

== Rankings ==
Ranking movements Legend: ██ Increase in ranking ██ Decrease in ranking т = Tied with team above or below ( ) = First-place votes
	Week												
Poll	Pre	1	2	3	4	5	6	7	8	9	10	11	Final
AFCA	14	12	11	10	10	9	9	6	4	4	т 3 (1)	3 (1)	1 (28)
D2Football.com	15	13	12	11	11	9	9	7	5	5	4	4	1

== Preseason ==
The GAC coaches preseason poll was released on August 1, 2023. The Bisons were predicted to finish second in the conference. Ouachita Baptist was favored to win the conference.

== Game summaries ==
=== At Southern Nazarene ===
No. 14 Harding Bisons at Southern Nazarene Crimson Storm – Game summary

Quarter	1	2	3	4	Total
No. 14 Bisons	14	21	11	7	53
Crimson Storm	0	0	6	14	20

at SNU Stadium, Bethany, Oklahoma

- Date: August 31
- Game time: 6:00 p.m. CDT
- Game weather: Sunny
- Game attendance: 1,754
- Referee: Dan Wilson
- Box score, Recap

Game information
First quarter
- HAR – Blake Delacruz 4-yard run (Grant Ennis kick), 8:37. Bisons 7–0. Drive: 10 plays, 53 yards, 6:19.
- HAR – Blake Delacruz 6-yard run (Grant Ennis kick), 1:02. Bisons 14–0. Drive: 1 play, 6 yards, 0:03.

Second quarter

- HAR – Blake Delacruz 3-yard run (Grant Ennis kick), 12:16. Bisons 21–0. Drive: 5 plays, 56 yards, 2:37.
- HAR – Braden Jay 26-yard pass from Cole Keylon (Grant Ennis kick), 8:21. Bisons 28–0. Drive: 4 plays, 16 yards, 2:19.
- HAR – Blake Delacruz 3-yard run (Grant Ennis kick), 1:05. Bisons 35–0. Drive: 7 plays, 74 yards, 2:51.

Third quarter

- SNU – Gage Porter 18-yard run (kick failed), 11:41. Bisons 35–6. Drive: 1 play, 18 yards, 0:08.
- HAR – Cole Keylon 6-yard run (Cole Keylon run), 8:18. Bisons 43–6. Drive: 6 plays, 60 yards, 3:17.
- HAR – Grant Ennis 39-yard field goal, 3:11. Bisons 46–6. Drive: 4 plays, 8 yards, 2:25.

Fourth quarter

- SNU – Gage Porter 1-yard run (Kameron Van Prooyen kick), 14:55. Bisons 46–13. Drive: 8 plays, 75 yards, 3:16.
- HAR – Josh Strickland Jr. 24-yard run (Grant Ennis kick), 11:28. Bisons 53–13. Drive: 6 plays, 62 yards, 3:19.
- SNU – Angel Ramirez 6-yard pass from Jarvis Davis (Kameron Van Prooyen kick), 1:30. Bisons 53–20. Drive: 6 plays, 62 yards, 2:27.

Statistics	HAR	SNU
First downs	19	14
Total yards	322	322
Rushing yards	282	145
Passing yards	40	177
Turnovers	2	6
Time of possession	33:29	26:31

Team	Category	Player	Statistics
Harding	Passing	Cole Keylon	2/3, 40 yards, TD
Harding	Rushing	Braden Jay	4 rushes, 63 yards
Harding	Receiving	Braden Jay	1 reception, 26 yards, TD
Southern Nazarene	Passing	Gage Porter	6/16, 116 yards, 3 INT
Southern Nazarene	Rushing	Gage Porter	26 rushes, 102 yards, 2 TD
Southern Nazarene	Receiving	Andrew Tisdale	2 receptions, 74 yards

=== Oklahoma Baptist ===
Oklahoma Baptist Bison at No. 12 Harding Bisons – Game summary

Quarter	1	2	3	4	Total
OKB Bison	0	10	0	0	10
No. 12 HAR Bisons	14	14	7	14	49

at First Security Stadium, Searcy, Arkansas

- Date: September 9
- Game time: 7:00 p.m. CDT
- Game weather: Sunny, 76 °F (24 °C)
- Game attendance: 2,800
- Referee: Dewayne Barbee
- Box score, Recap

Game information
First quarter
- HAR – Jhalen Spicer 19-yard run (Grant Ennis kick), 8:46. Harding 7–0. Drive: 10 plays, 77 yards, 6:07.
- HAR – Cole Keylon 7-yard run (Grant Ennis kick), 3:00. Harding 14–0. Drive: 8 plays, 75 yards, 4:03.

Second quarter

- OKB – Luke Watkins 20-yard field goal, 13:25. Harding 14–3. Drive: 11 plays, 72 yards, 4:35.
- HAR – Darius Brown 76-yard pass from Cole Keylon (Grant Ennis kick), 11:39. Harding 21–3. Drive: 3 plays, 90 yards, 1:37.
- OKB – Nick Harris 29-yard pass from Aidan Thompson (Luke Watkins kick), 7:20. Harding 21–10. Drive: 6 plays, 25 yards, 2:31.
- HAR – Will White 48-yard pass from Cole Keylon (Grant Ennis kick), 3:55. Harding 28–10. Drive: 6 plays, 72 yards, 3:01.

Third quarter

- HAR – Zach Strickland 72-yard fumble return (Grant Ennis kick), 9:39. Harding 35–10.

Fourth quarter

- HAR – Andrew Miller 55-yard run (Grant Ennis kick), 14:00. Harding 42–10. Drive: 1 play, 55 yards, 0:10.
- HAR – Will White 7-yard pass from Malik Young (Grant Ennis kick), 11:30. Harding 49–10. Drive: 4 plays, 27 yards, 2:15.

Statistics	OKB	HAR
First downs	15	25
Total yards	238	513
Rushing yards	9	382
Passing yards	229	131
Turnovers	3	1
Time of possession	27:32	32:28

Team	Category	Player	Statistics
Oklahoma Baptist	Passing	Aidan Thompson	27/44, 229 yards, TD, INT
Oklahoma Baptist	Rushing	E. J. Moore	6 rushes, 14 yards
Oklahoma Baptist	Receiving	Michael Marshall	6 receptions, 63 yards
Harding	Passing	Cole Keylon	2/5, 124 yards, 2 TD
Harding	Rushing	Andrew Miller	5 rushes, 69 yards, TD
Harding	Receiving	Darius Brown	1 reception, 76 yards, TD

=== Arkansas–Monticello ===
Arkansas–Monticello Boll Weevils at No. 11 Harding Bisons – Game summary

Quarter	1	2	3	4	Total
Boll Weevils	6	6	0	7	19
No. 11 Bisons	21	14	14	10	59

at First Security Stadium, Searcy, Arkansas

- Date: September 16
- Game time: 6:00 p.m. CDT
- Game weather: Cloudy, 81 °F (27 °C)
- Game attendance: 3,100
- Referee: Chuck Scott
- Box score, Recap

Game information
First quarter
- HAR – Braden Jay 14-yard run (Grant Ennis kick), 10:19. Bisons 7–0. Drive: 5 plays, 45 yards, 2:38.
- HAR – Blake Delacruz 8-yard run (Grant Ennis kick), 5:49. Bisons 14–0. Drive: 5 plays, 44 yards, 2:54.
- UAM – Demauryon 10-yard fumble return (kick failed), 3:40. Bisons 14–6.
- HAR – Blake Delacruz 2-yard run (Grant Ennis kick), 0:49. Bisons 21–6. Drive: 5 plays, 71 yards, 2:42.

Second quarter

- HAR – Jhalen Spicer 24-yard run (Grant Ennis kick), 5:30. Bisons 28–6. Drive: 7 plays, 80 yards, 3:59.
- UAM – Arlie Lee 28-yard pass from Demilon Brown (kick blocked), 2:28. Bisons 28–12. Drive: 7 plays, 72 yards, 3:02.
- HAR – Blake Delacruz 4-yard run (Grant Ennis kick), 0:47. Bisons 35–12. Drive: 4 plays, 56 yards, 0:58.

Third quarter

- HAR – Cole Keylon 1-yard run (Grant Ennis kick), 11:05. Bisons 42–12. Drive: 7 plays, 55 yards, 3:46.
- HAR – Devonte Manning 0-yard fumble return (Grant Ennis kick), 10:07. Bisons 49–12.

Fourth quarter

- UAM – Arlie Lee 4-yard run (Dylan Duhon kick), 13:42. Bisons 49–19. Drive: 3 plays, 55 yards, 1:09.
- HAR – Tyler Ross 32-yard run (Grant Ennis kick), 12:46. Bisons 56–19. Drive: 2 plays, 39 yards, 0:47.
- HAR – Grant Ennis 33-yard field goal, 6:30. Bisons 59–19. Drive: 5 plays, 54 yards, 3:02.

Statistics	UAM	HAR
First downs	11	24
Total yards	217	463
Rushing yards	34	424
Passing yards	183	39
Turnovers	4	4
Time of possession	26:24	33:36

Team	Category	Player	Statistics
Arkansas–Monticello	Passing	Demilon Brown	18/32, 183 yards, TD, 2 INT
Arkansas–Monticello	Rushing	Demilon Brown	12 rushes, 15 yards
Arkansas–Monticello	Receiving	Kristian Gammage	3 receptions, 92 yards
Harding	Passing	Cole Keylon	1/3, 39 yards
Harding	Rushing	Jhalen Spicer	5 rushes, 76 yards, TD
Harding	Receiving	Braden Jay	1 reception, 39 yards

Entering the game, the Boll Weevils had the top offense in the GAC, scoring 53.5 points per game, but here weld to just 217 yards of offense against Harding.

=== At No. 20 Henderson State ===
No. 10 Harding Bisons at No. 20 Henderson State Reddies – Game summary

Quarter	1	2	3	4	Total
No. 10 Bisons	0	7	13	7	27
No. 20 Reddies	3	6	7	0	16

at Carpenter–Haygood Stadium, Arkadelphia, Arkansas

- Date: September 23
- Game time: 6:00 p.m. CDT
- Game weather: Cloudy, 89 °F (32 °C)
- Game attendance: 6,013
- Referee: Michael Catton
- Box score, Recap

Game information
First quarter
- HSU – Kolby King 38-yard field goal, 8:00. Reddies 3–0. Drive: 4 plays, 6 yards, 1:13.

Second quarter

- HSU – Timieone 8-yard pass from Andrew Edwards (kick failed), 4:32. Reddies 9–0. Drive: 7 plays, 76 yards, 2:10.
- HAR – Braden Jay 37-yard run (Grant Ennis kick), 1:46. Reddies 9–7. Drive: 6 plays, 74 yards, 2:39.

Third quarter

- HAR – Blake Delacruz 2-yard run (run failed), 8:22. Bisons 13–9. Drive: 11 plays, 65 yards, 6:38.
- HSU – Jaquarion Turner 1-yard run (Kolby King kick), 6:03. Reddies 16–13. Drive: 6 plays, 79 yards, 2:13.
- HAR – Blake Delacruz 53-yard run (Grant Ennis kick), 4:31. Bisons 20–16. Drive: 3 plays, 70 yards, 1:24.

Fourth quarter

- HAR – Blake Delacruz 12-yard run (Grant Ennis kick), 4:56. Bisons 27–16. Drive: 13 plays, 61 yards, 7:33.

Statistics	HAR	HSU
First downs	22	11
Total yards	363	244
Rushing yards	353	54
Passing yards	10	190
Turnovers	1	0
Time of possession	39:53	19:57

Team	Category	Player	Statistics
Harding	Passing	Cole Keylon	1/4, 10 yards
Harding	Rushing	Blake Delacruz	31 rushes, 179 yards, 3 TD
Harding	Receiving	Dane Romberger	1 reception, 10 yards
Henderson State	Passing	Andrew Edwards	15/28, 190 yards, TD
Henderson State	Rushing	Andrew Edwards	6 rushes, 24 yards
Henderson State	Receiving	Timieone Jackson	7 receptions, 96 yards, TD

=== Southwestern Oklahoma State ===
Southwestern Oklahoma State Bulldogs at No. 10 Harding Bisons – Game summary

Quarter	1	2	3	4	Total
Bulldogs	0	0	0	0	0
No. 10 Bisons	7	21	20	16	64

at First Security Stadium, Searcy, Arkansas

- Date: September 30
- Game time: 6:00 p.m. CDT
- Game weather: Sunny, 88 °F (31 °C)
- Game attendance: 2,300
- Referee: Brad Frisby
- Box score, Recap

Game information
First quarter
- HAR – Roland Wallce 11-yard pass from Cole Keylon (Magnus Lepak kick), 6:15. Bisons 7–0. Drive: 12 plays, 65 yards, 7:10.

Second quarter

- HAR – Blake Delacruz 6-yard run (Magnus Lepak kick), 9:55. Bisons 14–0. Drive: 7 plays, 76 yards, 4:03.
- HAR – Omar Sinclair 18-yard run (Magnus Lepak kick), 4:27. Bisons 21–0. Drive: 7 plays, 75 yards, 3:44.
- HAR – Will White 50-yard pass from Cole Keylon (Magnus Lepak kick), 2:28. Bisons 28–0. Drive: 1 play, 50 yards, 0:08.

Third quarter

- HAR – Malik Young 9-yard run (Magnus Lepak kick), 9:57. Bisons 35–0. Drive: 8 plays, 48 yards, 4:53.
- HAR – Andrew Miller 32-yard run (kick failed), 6:10. Bisons 41–0. Drive: 3 plays, 44 yards, 1:24.
- HAR – Kekoa Carroll 30-yard interception return (Magnus Lepak kick), 5:12. Bisons 48–0.

Fourth quarter

- HAR – Magnus Lepak 24-yard field goal, 13:46. Bisons 51–0. Drive: 7 plays, 60 yards, 3:41.
- HAR – Darion Dunlap-Johnson 23-yard interception return (kick failed), 13:37. Bisons 57–0.
- HAR – Andrew Miller 81-yard run (Magnus Lepak kick), 8:00. Bisons 64–0. Drive: 2 plays, 85 yards, 0:52.

Statistics	SWO	HAR
First downs	4	25
Total yards	79	587
Rushing yards	29	462
Passing yards	50	125
Turnovers	2	0
Time of possession	24:38	35:22

Team	Category	Player	Statistics
SW Oklahoma State	Passing	Sean Shelby	5/9, 26 yards, 2 INT
SW Oklahoma State	Rushing	Troy Henderson	5 rushes, 16 yards
SW Oklahoma State	Receiving	Elijah Reed	3 receptions, 29 yards
Harding	Passing	Cole Keylon	5/6, 125 yards, 2 TD
Harding	Rushing	Andrew Miller	7 rushes, 134 yards, 2 TD
Harding	Receiving	Will White	1 reception, 50 yards, TD

Quarterback Cole Keylon completed five passes, each going to a different receiver.

=== At Northwestern Oklahoma State ===
No. 9 Harding Bisons at Northwestern Oklahoma State Rangers – Game summary

Quarter	1	2	3	4	Total
No. 9 Bisons	14	28	7	13	62
Rangers	0	0	0	0	0

at Ranger Field, Alva, Oklahoma

- Date: October 7
- Game time: 4:00 p.m. CDT
- Game weather: Sunny, 68 °F (20 °C)
- Game attendance: 3,213
- Referee: Dan Wilson
- Box score, Recap

Game information
First quarter
- HAR – Cole Keylon 10-yard run (Magnus Lepak kick), 10:55. Bisons 7–0. Drive: 6 plays, 71 yards, 3:59.
- HAR – Darius Brown 34-yard pass from Cole Keylon (Magnus Lepak kick), 8:18. Bisons 14–0. Drive: 2 plays, 46 yards, 0:49.

Second quarter

- HAR – Braden Jay 37-yard run (Magnus Lepak kick), 14:51. Bisons 21–0. Drive: 9 plays, 75 yards, 5:08.
- HAR – Blake Delacruz 1-yard run (Magnus Lepak kick), 11:00. Bisons 28–0. Drive: 5 plays, 60 yards, 2:59.
- HAR – Chauncey Martin 23-yard run (Magnus Lepak kick), 6:51. Bisons 35–0. Drive: 3 plays, 36 yards, 1:24.
- HAR – Malik Young 2-yard run (Magnus Lepak kick), 0:23. Bisons 42–0. Drive: 9 plays, 73 yards, 4:55.

Third quarter

- HAR – Josh Strickland Jr. 6-yard run (Magnus Lepak kick), 6:02. Bisons 49–0. Drive: 4 plays, 48 yards, 1:56.

Fourth quarter

- HAR – Oric Walker Jr. 99-yard interception return (Magnus Lepak kick), 7:20. Bisons 56–0.
- HAR – Travis Greenwalt 51-yard interception return (kick blocked), 5:08. Bisons 62–0.

Statistics	HAR	NWO
First downs	21	6
Total yards	414	108
Rushing yards	380	63
Passing yards	34	45
Turnovers	0	4
Time of possession	22:09	37:51

Team	Category	Player	Statistics
Harding	Passing	Cole Keylon	1/2, 34 yards, TD
Harding	Rushing	Cole Keylon	7 rushes, 90 yards, TD
Harding	Receiving	Darius Brown	1 reception, 34 yards, TD
NW Oklahoma State	Passing	Caleb Deal	11/20, 45 yards, 4 INT
NW Oklahoma State	Rushing	Jashaun Foster	8 rushes, 27 yards
NW Oklahoma State	Receiving	Chancelor Gill	4 receptions, 21 yards

=== No. 5 Ouachita Baptist ===
No. 5 Ouachita Baptist Tigers at No. 9 Harding Bisons – Game summary

Quarter	1	2	3	4	Total
No. 5 Tigers	0	3	7	0	10
No. 9 Bisons	7	3	10	21	41

at First Security Stadium, Searcy, Arkansas

- Date: October 14
- Game time: 6:00 p.m. CDT
- Game weather: Sunny, 64 °F (18 °C)
- Game attendance: 5,600
- Referee: Darin Lair
- Box score, Recap

Game information
First quarter
- HAR – Roland Wallace 22-yard run (Grant Ennis kick), 2:07. Bisons 7–0. Drive: 11 plays, 80 yards, 6:10.

Second quarter

- OUA – Gabe Goodman 45-yard field goal, 8:23. Bisons 7–3. Drive: 5 plays, 36 yards, 2:16.
- HAR – Grant Ennis 26-yard field goal, 0:00. Bisons 10–3. Drive: 10 plays, 57 yards, 2:10.

Third quarter

- OUA – Riley Harms 2-yard run (Gabe Goodman kick), 10:39. Tied 10–10. Drive: 10 plays, 75 yards, 4:21.
- HAR – Grant Ennis 34-yard field goal, 4:40. Bisons 13–10. Drive: 10 plays, 53 yards, 5:50.
- HAR – Omar Sinclair 4-yard run (Grant Ennis kick), 2:12. Bisons 20–10. Drive: 3 plays, 6 yards, 1:32.

Fourth quarter

- HAR – Braden Jay 9-yard run (Grant Ennis kick), 11:13. Bisons 27–10. Drive: 5 plays, 58 yards, 2:47.
- HAR – Blake Delacruz 1-yard run (Grant Ennis kick), 3:41. Bisons 34–10. Drive: 7 plays, 66 yards, 4:20.
- HAR – Braden Jay 54-yard run (Grant Ennis kick), 0:37. Bisons 41–10. Drive: 3 plays, 75 yards, 1:23.

Statistics	OUA	HAR
First downs	14	22
Total yards	234	427
Rushing yards	155	427
Passing yards	79	0
Turnovers	1	2
Time of possession	26:35	33:25

Team	Category	Player	Statistics
Ouachita Baptist	Passing	Riley Harms	13/27, 79 yards
Ouachita Baptist	Rushing	Kendel Givens	23 rushes, 146 yards
Ouachita Baptist	Receiving	Connor Flannigan	8 receptions, 38 yards
Harding	Passing	Cole Keylon	0/1, 0 yards, INT
Harding	Rushing	Braden Jay	10 rushes, 131 yards, 2 TD
Harding	Receiving	None	

The no. 9 Bisons downed the no. 5 Tigers, handing Oauchita Baptist its first loss of the season.

=== At Southern Arkansas ===
No. 6 Harding Bisons at Southern Arkansas Muleriders – Game summary

Quarter	1	2	3	4	Total
No. 6 Bisons	14	10	21	9	54
Muleriders	7	0	7	6	20

at Memorial Stadium, El Dorado, Arkansas

- Date: October 21
- Game time: 2:00 p.m.
- Game weather: Sunny, 86 °F (30 °C)
- Game attendance: 1,196
- Referee: Dewayne Barbee
- Box score, Recap

Game information
First quarter
- HAR – Blake Delacruz 6-yard run (Grant Ennis kick), 10:42. Bisons 7–0. Drive: 8 plays, 75 yards, 4:18.
- SAU – Kadyn Roach 73-yard run (Hayden Nitz kick), 4:08. Tied 7–7. Drive: 1 play, 73 yards, 0:10.
- HAR – Will Fitzhugh 1-yard run (Grant Ennis kick), 3:18. Bisons 14–7. Drive: 2 plays, 75 yards, 0:50.

Second quarter

- HAR – Jhalen Spicer 7-yard run (Grant Ennis kick), 8:08. Bisons 21–7. Drive: 13 plays, 99 yards, 6:59.
- HAR – Grant Ennis 35-yard field goal, 0:00. Bisons 24–7. Drive: 12 plays, 79 yards, 2:55.

Third quarter

- SAU – Jariq Scales 28-yard run (Hayden Nitz kick), 12:15. Bisons 24–14. Drive: 6 plays, 65 yards, 2:45.
- HAR – Braden Jay 66-yard run (Grant Ennis kick), 11:12. Bisons 31–14. Drive: 3 plays, 69 yards, 0:57.
- HAR – Blake Delacruz 24-yard run (Grant Ennis kick), 7:27. Bisons 38–14. Drive: 4 plays, 72 yards, 2:24.
- HAR – Andrew Miller 5-yard run (Grant Ennis kick), 0:53. Bisons 45–14. Drive: 8 plays, 72 yards, 4:49.

Fourth quarter

- SAU – Matthew Witten 30-yard pass from O. B. Jones (kick blocked), 12:54. Bisons 45–20. Drive: 8 plays, 80 yards, 2:52.
- HAR – Ahmad Butler 89-yard PAT return, 12:54. Bisons 47–20.
- HAR – Will Fitzhugh 4-yard run (Grant Ennis kick), 7:56. Bisons 54–20. Drive: 8 plays, 63 yards, 4:50.

Statistics	HAR	SAU
First downs	29	19
Total yards	653	462
Rushing yards	631	264
Passing yards	22	198
Turnovers	0	2
Time of possession	36:09	23:51

Team	Category	Player	Statistics
Harding	Passing	Cole Keylon	2/6, 22 yards
Harding	Rushing	Braden Jay	8 rushes, 202 yards, TD
Harding	Receiving	Braden Jay	2 receptions, 22 yards
Southern Arkansas	Passing	O. B. Jones	15/23, 169 yards, TD
Southern Arkansas	Rushing	Kadyn Roach	4 rushes, 94 yards, TD
Southern Arkansas	Receiving	Jakarion Lockett	4 receptions, 65 yards

=== At Southeastern Oklahoma State ===
No. 4 Harding Bisons at Southeastern Oklahoma State Savage Storm – Game summary

Quarter	1	2	3	4	Total
No. 4 Bisons	21	10	14	10	55
Savage Storm	0	0	0	0	0

at Paul Laird Field, Durant, Oklahoma

- Date: October 28
- Game time: 2:00 p.m. CDT
- Game weather: Rain, 54 °F (12 °C)
- Game attendance: 1,178
- Referee: Michael Catton
- Box score, Recap

Game information
First quarter
- HAR – Braden Jay 29-yard run (Grant Ennis kick), 9:07. Bisons 7–0. Drive: 5 plays, 60 yards, 2:57.
- HAR – Blake Delacruz 6-yard run (Grant Ennis kick), 3:37. Bisons 14–0. Drive: 5 plays, 53 yards, 2:27.
- HAR – Chauncey Martin 5-yard run (Grant Ennis kick), 1:20. Bisons 21–0. Drive: 3 plays, 65 yards, 1:19.

Second quarter

- HAR – Cole Keylon 1-yard run (Grant Ennis kick), 6:56. Bisons 28–0. Drive: 12 plays, 80 yards, 6:51.
- HAR – Grant Ennis 41-yard field goal, 0:00. Bisons 31–0. Drive: 6 plays, 9 yards, 1:16.

Third quarter

- HAR – Cole Keylon 4-yard run (Grant Ennis kick), 12:31. Bisons 38–0. Drive: 5 plays, 47 yards, 2:22.
- HAR – Will Fitzhugh 26-yard run (Grant Ennis kick), 9:04. Bisons 45–0. Drive: 4 plays, 56 yards, 2:02.

Fourth quarter

- HAR – Grant Ennis 28-yard field goal, 13:27. Bisons 48–0. Drive: 5 plays, -1 yards, 2:13.
- HAR – Chauncey Martin 28-yard run (Grant Ennis kick), 6:22. Bisons 55–0. Drive: 7 plays, 78 yards, 4:06.

Statistics	HAR	SOU
First downs	27	8
Total yards	502	141
Rushing yards	436	45
Passing yards	66	96
Turnovers	1	5
Time of possession	36:39	23:21

Team	Category	Player	Statistics
Harding	Passing	Cole Keylon	1/2, 39 yards
Harding	Rushing	Braden Jay	6 rushes, 70 yards, TD
Harding	Receiving	Darius Brown	1 reception, 39 yards
SE Oklahoma State	Passing	Weston Conaway	13/22, 71 yards, 3 INT
SE Oklahoma State	Rushing	D. J. Brown	9 rushes, 42 yards
SE Oklahoma State	Receiving	Duce Pittman	2 receptions, 23 yards

=== East Central ===
East Central Tigers at No. 4 Harding Bisons – Game summary

Quarter	1	2	3	4	Total
Tigers	0	0	0	7	7
No. 4 Bisons	7	14	21	6	48

at First Security Stadium, Searcy, Arkansas

- Date: November 4
- Game time: 3:00 p.m. CDT
- Game weather: Sunny, 71 °F (22 °C)
- Game attendance: 5,500
- Referee: Darin Lair
- Box score, Recap

Game information
First quarter
- HAR – Cole Keylon 5-yard run (Grant Ennis kick), 7:16. Bisons 7–0. Drive: 10 plays, 66 yards, 5:25.

Second quarter

- HAR – Blake Delacruz 3-yard run (Grant Ennis kick), 14:54. Bisons 14–0. Drive: 11 plays, 52 yards, 5:28.
- HAR – Cole Keylon 4-yard run (Grant Ennis kick), 1:26. Bisons 21–0. Drive: 15 plays, 85 yards, 8:17.

Third quarter

- HAR – Braden Jay 27-yard run (Grant Ennis kick), 9:58. Bisons 28–0. Drive: 9 plays, 92 yards, 4:58.
- HAR – Cole Keylon 1-yard run (Grant Ennis kick), 7:20. Bisons 35–0. Drive: 4 plays, 65 yards, 1:45.
- HAR – Omar Sinclair 4-yard run (Grant Ennis kick), 3:27. Bisons 42–0. Drive: 5 plays, 63 yards, 2:48.

Fourth quarter

- HAR – Myron Mason 10-yard run (kick failed), 10:58. Bisons 48–0. Drive: 11 plays, 84 yards, 6:31.
- ECU – Jace Wyatt 5-yard pass from Traair Edwards (Tommy Yousey kick), 5:44. Bisons 48–7. Drive: 12 plays, 65 yards, 5:14.

Statistics	ECU	HAR
First downs	7	30
Total yards	134	528
Rushing yards	22	528
Passing yards	112	0
Turnovers	0	0
Time of possession	20:24	39:36

Team	Category	Player	Statistics
East Central	Passing	Traair Edwards	7/11, 69 yards, TD
East Central	Rushing	David Hall	7 rushes, 13 yards
East Central	Receiving	Hayden Stewart	3 receptions, 34 yards
Harding	Passing	Cole Keylon	0/2, 0 yards
Harding	Rushing	Blake Delacruz	18 rushes, 112 yards, TD
Harding	Receiving	None	

The Tigers were held to just 134 yards of total offense while Harding only attempted two passes, both of which were incomplete.

=== At Arkansas Tech ===
No. 3 Harding Bisons at Arkansas Tech Wonder Boys – Game summary

Quarter	1	2	3	4	Total
No. 3 Bisons	14	28	7	7	56
Wonder Boys	0	0	0	0	0

at Simmons Bank Field, Russellville, Arkansas

- Date: November 11
- Game time: 2:00 p.m. CST
- Game weather: Sunny, 62 °F (17 °C)
- Game attendance: 2,347
- Referee: Frank Wittenberg
- Box score, Recap

Game information
First quarter
- HAR – Zach Strickland 26-yard interception return (Grant Ennis kick), 10:58. Bisons 7–0.
- HAR – Chauncey Martin 9-yard run (Grant Ennis kick), 5:18. Bisons 14–0. Drive: 5 plays, 60 yards, 2:49.

Second quarter

- HAR – Cole Keylon 7-yard run (Grant Ennis kick), 10:20. Bisons 21–0. Drive: 15 plays,66 yards, 7:51.
- HAR – Cole Keylon 4-yard run (Grant Ennis kick), 5:31. Bisons 28–0. Drive: 4 plays, 15 yards, 2:15.
- HAR – Ty Dugger 64-yard punt return (Grant Ennis kick), 2:38. Bisons 35–0.
- HAR – Braden Jay 44-yard pass from Cole Keylon (Grant Ennis kick), 0:00. Bisons 42–0. Drive: 3 plays, 48 yards, 1:05.

Third quarter

- HAR – Jhalen Spicer 3-yard run (Grant Ennis kick), 11:39. Bisons 49–0. Drive: 6 plays, 85 yards, 3:10.

Fourth quarter

- HAR – Andrew Miller 4-yard run (Grant Ennis kick), 6:12. Bisons 56–0. Drive: 7 plays, 28 yards, 4:08.

Statistics	HAR	ATU
First downs	20	8
Total yards	418	91
Rushing yards	333	-27
Passing yards	85	118
Turnovers	0	1
Time of possession	38:41	21:19

Team	Category	Player	Statistics
Harding	Passing	Cole Keylon	2/3, 85 yards, TD
Harding	Rushing	Andrew Miller	11 rushes, 80 yards, TD
Harding	Receiving	Braden Jay	1 reception, 44 yards, TD
Arkansas Tech	Passing	Taye Gatewood	10/20, 70 yards, INT
Arkansas Tech	Rushing	Deuce Wise	6 rushes, 6 yards
Arkansas Tech	Receiving	Joyrion Chase	2 receptions, 31 yards

=== No. 6 Central Missouri (NCAA Division II Second Round) ===
No. 6 Central Missouri Mules at No. 3 Harding Bisons (NCAA Division II Second Round) – Game summary

Quarter	1	2	3	4	Total
No. 6 Mules	7	7	7	13	34
No. 3 Bisons	7	14	7	7	35

at First Security Stadium, Searcy, Arkansas

- Date: November 25
- Game time: 1:00 p.m. CST
- Game weather: Cloudy, 50 °F (10 °C)
- Game attendance: 3,500
- Referee: Craig Demaree
- Box score, Recap

Game information
First quarter
- UCM – Zion Perry 30-yard pass from Zach Zebrowski (Luke Dobson kick), 11:21. Mules 7–0. Drive: 9 plays, 75 yards, 3:39.
- HAR – Cole Keylon 1-yard run (Grant Ennis kick), 2:56. Tied 7–7. Drive: 14 plays, 68 yards, 8:18.

Second quarter

- HAR – Blake Delacruz 1-yard run (Grant Ennis kick), 5:53. Bisons 14–7. Drive: 16 plays, 95 yards, 9:26.
- UCM – Arkell Smith 5-yard pass from Zach Zebrowski (Luke Dobson kick), 3:17. Tied 14–14. Drive: 6 plays, 87 yards, 2:36.
- HAR – Chauncey Martin 38-yard run (Grant Ennis kick), 1:08. Bisons 21–14. Drive: 5 plays, 56 yards, 1:56.

Third quarter

- HAR – Chauncey Martin 89-yard run (Grant Ennis kick), 4:16. Bisons 28–14. Drive: 3 plays, 94 yards, 1:20.
- UCM – Michael Fitzgerald 28-yard pass from Zach Zebrowski (Luke Dobson kick), 0:49. Bisons 28–21. Drive: 8 plays, 75 yards, 3:14.

Fourth quarter

- HAR – Blake Delacruz 12-yard run (Grant Ennis kick), 6:52. Bisons 35–21. Drive: 16 plays, 69 yards, 8:49.
- UCM – Arkell Smith 87-yard pass from Zach Zebrowski (Luke Dobson kick), 5:58. Bisons 35–28. Drive: 3 plays, 95 yards, 0:43.
- UCM – Arkell Smith 6-yard pass from Zach Zebrowski (kick blocked), 0:22. Bisons 35–34. Drive: 10 plays, 69 yards, 2:42.

Statistics	UCM	HAR
First downs	27	20
Total yards	534	418
Rushing yards	109	384
Passing yards	425	34
Turnovers	0	0
Time of possession	24:18	35:42

Team	Category	Player	Statistics
Central Missouri	Passing	Zach Zebrowski	34/44, 425 yards, 5 TD
Central Missouri	Rushing	Zach Zebrowski	16 rushes, 94 yards
Central Missouri	Receiving	Arkell Smith	9 receptions, 150 yards, 3 TD
Harding	Passing	Zach Strickland	1/1, 26 yards
Harding	Rushing	Blake Delacruz	34 rushes, 154 yards, 2 TD
Harding	Receiving	Ty Dugger	1 reception, 26 yards

The Mules scored a touchdown with less than 30 seconds in regulation, needing an extra point to tie the game and potentially send it into overtime. However, Harding defensive lineman Gage Price blocked the game-tying PAT, securing the 35–34 victory for the Bisons.

=== No. 2 Grand Valley State (NCAA Division II Quarterfinal) ===
No. 2 Grand Valley State Lakers at No. 3 Harding Bisons (NCAA Division II Quarterfinals) – Game summary

Quarter	1	2	3	4	Total
No. 2 Lakers	0	6	0	0	6
No. 3 Bisons	0	0	0	7	7

at First Security Stadium, Searcy, Arkansas

- Date: December 2
- Game time: 1:00 p.m. CST
- Game weather: Cloudy, 53 °F (12 °C)
- Game attendance: 3,100
- Referee: Cecil Harrison
- Box score, Recap

Game information
First quarter
- No scoring plays

Second quarter

- GVS – Josh Gorball 48-yard field goal, 13:12. Lakers 3–0. Drive: 13 plays, 50 yards, 6:03.
- GVS – Josh Gorball 27-yard field goal, 0:00. Lakers 6–0. Drive: 9 plays, 54 yards, 1:05.

Third quarter

- No scoring plays

Fourth quarter

- HAR – Cole Keylon 1-yard run (Grant Ennis kick), 3:52. Bisons 7–6. Drive: 15 plays, 73 yards, 8:59.

Statistics	GVS	HAR
First downs	10	15
Total yards	222	225
Rushing yards	62	205
Passing yards	160	20
Turnovers	0	0
Time of possession	19:31	39:14

Team	Category	Player	Statistics
Grand Valley State	Passing	Cade Peterson	10/19, 123 yards
Grand Valley State	Rushing	Khalil Eichelberger	2 rushes, 31 yards
Grand Valley State	Receiving	Darrell Johnson	5 receptions, 63 yards
Harding	Passing	Cole Keylon	1/3, 20 yards
Harding	Rushing	Blake Delacruz	28 rushes, 70 yards
Harding	Receiving	Braden Jay	1 reception, 20 yards

In the quarterfinal round of the NCAA division II playoffs, Harding hosted no. 2 Grand Valley State from the Great Lakes Intercollegiate Athletic Conference. The Lakers entered the game with one of the best defenses in all of division II, holding opponents to an average of 17 points per game. The Lakers' defense held the Bisons scoreless for just over 56 minutes of game time before Harding quarterback Cole Keylon scored a 1-yard rushing touchdown.

=== No. 11 Lenoir–Rhyne (NCAA Division II Semifinals) ===
No. 11 Lenoir–Rhyne Bears at No. 3 Harding Bisons (NCAA Division II Semifinals) – Game summary

Quarter	1	2	3	4	Total
No. 11 Bears	0	7	0	7	14
No. 3 Bisons	14	20	14	7	55

at First Security Stadium, Searcy, Arkansas

- Date: December 9
- Game time: 11:00 a.m. CST
- Game weather: Cloudy, 58 °F (14 °C)
- Game attendance: 2,900
- Referee: Chris Glass
- Box score, Recap

Game information
First quarter
- HAR – Cole Keylon 1-yard run (Grant Ennis kick), 8:48. Bisons 7–0. Drive: 9 plays, 36 yards, 4:51.
- HAR – Blake Delacruz 9-yard run (Grant Ennis kick), 5:20. Bisons 14–0. Drive: 6 plays, 54 yards, 3:28.

Second quarter

- HAR – Blake Delacruz 4-yard run (Grant Ennis kick), 9:29. Bisons 21–0. Drive: 8 plays, 48 yards, 4:14.
- HAR – Braden Jay 1-yard run (Grant Ennis kick), 1:34. Bisons 28–0. Drive: 11 plays, 54 yards, 5:39.
- LRU – Zyheir Dillard 5-yard run (Jake Brown kick), 0:14. Bisons 28–7. Drive: 9 plays, 75 yards, 1:20.
- HAR – Braden Jay 89-yard kickoff return (kick failed), 0:04. Bisons 34–7.

Third quarter

- HAR – Roland Wallace 65-yard pass from Cole Keylon (Grant Ennis kick), 12:26. Bisons 41–7. Drive: 5 plays, 75 yards, 2:28.
- HAR – Chauncey Martin 17-yard run (Grant Ennis kick), 4:57. Bisons 48–7. Drive: 7 plays, 92 yards, 3:58.

Fourth quarter

- HAR – Andrew Miller 1-yard run (Grant Ennis kick), 9:10. Bisons 55–7. Drive: 6 plays, 24 yards, 3:25.
- LRU – Deondre Lester 52-yard pass from Jalen Ferguson (Jake Brown kick), 6:45. Bisons 55–14. Drive: 5 plays, 75 yards, 2:25.

Statistics	LRU	HAR
First downs	14	26
Total yards	336	500
Rushing yards	-3	431
Passing yards	339	69
Turnovers	1	1
Time of possession	19:17	40:43

Team	Category	Player	Statistics
Lenoir–Rhyne	Passing	Sean White	23/33, 270 yards, INT
Lenoir–Rhyne	Rushing	Deondre Lester	1 rush, 12 yards
Lenoir–Rhyne	Receiving	Deondre Lester	8 receptions, 139 yards, TD
Harding	Passing	Cole Keylon	2/3, 69 yards, TD
Harding	Rushing	Blake Delacruz	21 rushes, 147 yards, 2 TD
Harding	Receiving	Roland Wallace	1 reception, 65 yards, TD

=== Vs. No. 1 Colorado Mines (NCAA Division II Championship Game) ===
No. 3 Harding Bisons vs. No. 1 Colorado Mines Orediggers (NCAA Division II Championship Game) – Game summary

Quarter	1	2	3	4	Total
No. 3 Bisons	7	14	10	7	38
No. 1 Orediggers	7	0	0	0	7

at McKinney ISD Stadium, McKinney, Texas

- Date: December 16
- Game time: 12:00 p.m. CST
- Game weather: Sunny, 53 °F (12 °C)
- Game attendance: 12,552
- Referee: Bryan Earl
- Box score, Recap

Game information
First quarter
- CSM – Noah Roper 2-yard pass from John Matocha (Jacob Click kick), 9:06. Orediggers 7–0. Drive: 11 plays, 75 yards, 5:54.
- HAR – Jhalen Spicer 10-yard run (Grant Ennis kick), 3:49. Tied 7–7. Drive: 9 plays, 75 yards, 5:14.

Second quarter

- HAR – Braden Jay 10-yard run (Grant Ennis kick), 4:30. Bisons 14–7. Drive: 17 plays, 74 yards, 10:23.
- HAR – Braden Jay 9-yard run (Grant Ennis kick), 0:33. Bisons 21–7. Drive: 6 plays, 90 yards, 2:05.

Third quarter

- HAR – Braden Jay 73-yard run (Grant Ennis kick), 12:58. Bisons 28–7. Drive: 4 plays, 87 yards, 1:59.
- HAR – Grant Ennis 32-yard field goal, 4:11. Bisons 31–7. Drive: 10 plays, 57 yards, 6:07.

Fourth quarter

- HAR – Cole Keylon 1-yard run (Grant Ennis kick), 11:58. Bisons 38–7. Drive: 7 plays, 83 yards, 4:17.

Statistics	HAR	CSM
First downs	21	18
Total yards	548	341
Rushing yards	502	71
Passing yards	46	270
Turnovers	0	1
Time of possession	36:10	23:50

Team	Category	Player	Statistics
Harding	Passing	Cole Keylon	2/2, 46 yards
Harding	Rushing	Blake Delacruz	27 rushes, 212 yards
Harding	Receiving	Roland Wallace	2 receptions, 46 yards
Colorado Mines	Passing	John Matocha	24/33, 270 yards, TD, INT
Colorado Mines	Rushing	Landon Walker	6 rushes, 56 yards
Colorado Mines	Receiving	Max McLeod	14 receptions, 153

== Personnel ==
2023 Harding Bisons football team roster
Players
Coaches
Offense

Pos.	#	Name	Class
RB	7	Braden Jay	So
WR	8	Roland Wallace	Sr
RB	10	Jhalen Spicer	Jr
QB	12	Tyler Ross	So
WR	14	Will White	So
QB	15	Cole Keylon	So
QB	16	Malik Young	Fr
WR	18	Darius Brown	So
WR	19	Dane Romberger	Jr
RB	21	Chauncey Martin	Jr
RB	22	Will Fitzhugh	Jr
RB	23	Omar Sinclair	GS
WR	24	Malik Stotts	Fr
RB	26	Blake Delacruz	Jr
RB	30	Josh Strickland Jr.	Fr
RB	34	Andrew Miller	Fr
RB	37	Jimmy Citty	Jr
RB	37	Josh Evans-Pickens	Fr
OL	50	Dennis Carroll	Sr
OL	51	Levi Pate	Sr
OL	54	Landon Ray	Sr
OL	56	Jonathan Underwood	Jr
OL	57	Jake Dugger	Jr
OL	59	Jake Mitchell	So
OL	60	Cooper Welch	Fr
OL	63	David Gomez	So
OL	64	Elijah Swindle	So
OL	65	Adam Fager	So
OL	66	Dylan Cummings	Fr
OL	67	Josh Lawrence	Fr
OL	71	Jacob Formby	Fr
OL	73	Carter Lees	Fr
OL	74	Hunter Willis	Sr
OL	75	Austin Toler	Sr
OL	77	Cobe Williams	Fr
OL	78	Dylan Daring	So
OL	79	Duane Johnson	Jr
WR	80	Jake Harrell	So
WR	81	Joseph Alejo Jr.	Jr
WR	82	Isaac Miller	So
WR	86	Jackson Richardson	Fr
TE	87	Mike Ericson	So
WR	88	Drew Porter	So
WR		Jarret Atchley	Fr
WR		Brady Barnett	Fr
OL		Josh Cobb	Fr
QB		Jabari Collier	Fr
OL		Matt Colvin	Fr
OL		Vincent Cox	Fr
OL		Michael Esparza	Fr
RB		Brian Furch	Fr
OL		Isaac Gray	Fr
RB		Raymond Hudson	Fr
RB		E. J. Luckett	Fr
OL		Luke McCormick	Fr
TE		Levi Mercer	Fr
RB		Sam Mitchell	Fr
WR		Bodie Neal	Fr
OL		Johnathan Vining	Fr

Defense

Pos.	#	Name	Class
DB	0	Darion Dunlap-Johnson	Jr
DB	1	Kendale Allen	Jr
DB	2	Kyle McDonald	Jr
LB	3	Cayden Pierce	Jr
DB	4	Malik Mays	GS
DB	5	Ahmad Butler	Sr
DB	6	Travis Greenwalt	Jr
DL	9	Dre Hall	Jr
DB	11	Grayson Lewis	Fr
DB	13	Jeremiah Jordan	Fr
DB	16	Deion Campbell	Fr
DB	17	Cameron Mitchell-Johnson	Jr
DB	20	Ty Dugger	So
LB	24	Clark Griffin	So
LB	25	Travell Wright	So
DB	27	Luke Martin	Fr
DB	28	Oric Walker Jr.	Sr
DB	29	Troy Wiseman	Fr
DL	32	Nathaniel Wallace	Sr
DB	33	Cooper Carroll	Sr
DB	35	Danny Pierce	Jr
DB	36	Eli Moore	Fr
DB	38	Zac O'Day	Fr
LB	40	Mar'Reion Claybrooks	Fr
DB	41	Elijah Carlton	Fr
LB	41	Jackson Cody	Fr
LB	42	Kekoa Carroll	Jr
LB	43	Zach Strickland	Sr
LB	44	Landen Chaffey	So
DL	45	Devonte Manning	Jr
LB	47	Horacio Moronta	Jr
DB	48	Reese Elrod	Fr
LB	52	Jordan Mays	Fr
DL	55	Gage Price	Jr
DL	58	Austin Bailey	Jr
DL	61	Brock Knapton	Fr
DL	62	Aldrin Wilson	So
DL	76	B. J. Burke	Sr
DL	89	Justin Sobczak	Fr
DL	90	Jose Lopez	Fr
DL	91	Tirrell Johnson	Fr
DL	92	Bryce Rushing	Fr
DL	93	Tony Agyapong	Fr
DL	96	Landon Eades	Jr
DL	99	Wesley Coleman	Jr
DL		Nii Addy	Fr
LB		Christian Brumley	Fr
DL		Oneal Daniels	Fr
DL		Diego Davis	Fr
DB		Carter Hill	Fr
LB		Kaden Jones	Fr
DB		DeSean Mays	Fr
LB		Tyler Mitchell	Fr
DB		Drew Nelson	Fr
DL		Joseph Oluwayemi	Fr
DB		Matai Thomas	Fr
DB		G'Kyson Wright	Fr

Special teams

Pos.	#	Name	Class
K	39	Magnus Lepak	Fr
P	46	Ryan Fox	Sr
LS	49	Xavier Hylton	So
LS	53	Chase Whitfield	Jr
K	84	Grant Ennis	Sr
K		Josiah Linderman	Fr

Head coach

- Paul Simmons

Coordinators/assistant coaches

- Roddy Mote
  Defensive coordinator/Linebackers
- Luke Tribble
  Co-defensive coordinator/Special teams coordinator/Defensive backs
- Tre'von Biglow
  Defensive line
- Sam Blakenship
  Safeties
- Kevin Chism
  Offensive line
- Matt Middleton
  Quarterbacks/Fullbacks
- Matt Underwood
  Slotbacks/Wide receivers/Director of recruiting
- Kenny Wheaton
  Offensive consultant

Legend

- (C) Team captain
- (S) Suspended
- (I) Ineligible
- Injured
- Redshirt

Roster
Last update: December 17, 2023

== Statistical accomplishments ==
On offense, Harding prioritizes the run game, averaging over 400 rushing yards per game. In a game against Southern Arkansas on October 21, the team rushed for 631 yards and had two players (Braden Jay and Blake Delacruz) each tally over 200 rushing yards.

On defense, the team has recorded four shutouts and has allowed per-game averages of 10.92 points, 74.2 rushing yards, and 158.62 passing yards.

The team's individual statistical leaders include:

- Blake Delacruz with 1,149 rushing yards and 114 points scored;
- Cole Keylon with 546 passing yards;
- Braden Jay with seven receptions for 164 yards;

Harding became the first team in NCAA history to rush for over 6,000 yards in a single season.
