= Scott Wooster =

American football player and coach (born c. 1977)

Current position
- Title: Head coach
- Team: Grand Valley State
- Conference: GLIAC
- Record: 29–7

Biographical details
- Born: c. 1977 (age 48–49); Warren, Michigan, U.S.
- Education: Wayne State University (2001, 2007)

Playing career
- 1995: Eastern Michigan
- 1996–1999: Wayne State (MI)
- Positions: Right tackle, left guard

Coaching career (HC unless noted)
- 2000–2008: Warren Mott HS (MI) (OC/OL)
- 2009–2012: Wayne State (MI) (TE)
- 2013–2019: Wayne State (MI) (OL)
- 2020–2022: Grand Valley State (OL/TE)
- 2023–present: Grand Valley State

Head coaching record
- Overall: 29–7
- Tournaments: 3–2 (NCAA D-II playoffs)

Accomplishments and honors

Championships
- 1 GLIAC (2023)

Awards
- 1 GLIAC Coach of the Year (2023)

Scott Wooster (born c. 1977) is an American college football coach. He is the head football coach for Grand Valley State University, a position he has held since 2023. He previously coached for Warren Mott High School and Wayne State. He played college football for Eastern Michigan and Wayne State as a right tackle and left guard.

== Head coaching record ==
Year	Team	Overall	Conference	Standing	Bowl/playoffs	AFCA^{#}	D2^{°}
Grand Valley State Lakers (Great Lakes Intercollegiate Athletic Conference) (2023–present)
2023	Grand Valley State	11–2	6–0	1st	L NCAA Division II Quarterfinal	3	3
2024	Grand Valley State	11–2	6–1	2nd	L NCAA Division II Second Round	6	6
2025	Grand Valley State	7–3	5–2	T–2nd			19
Grand Valley State:		29–7	17–3				
Total:		29–7					
