= 2023 Colorado Mines Orediggers football team =

American college football season

2023 Colorado Mines Orediggers football

RMAC champion

NCAA Division II championship game, L 7–38 vs. Harding
- Conference: Rocky Mountain Athletic Conference

Ranking
- AFCA: No. 2
- Record: 14–1 (9–0 RMAC)
- Head coach: Pete Sterbick (1st season)
- Offensive coordinator: Tim Brandon (1st season)
- Offensive scheme: Spread
- Defensive coordinator: Tripp Thomas (2nd season)
- Base defense: 4–3
- Home stadium: Alumni Field at Marv Kay Stadium

2023 Rocky Mountain Athletic Conference football standings
	Conf.			Overall
Team	W		L	W		L
No. 2 Colorado Mines $^	9	–	0	14	–	1
No. 15 Western Colorado ^	8	–	1	10	–	2
CSU Pueblo	7	–	2	8	–	3
Black Hills State	5	–	4	6	–	5
Colorado Mesa	5	–	4	6	–	5
Chadron State	4	–	5	5	–	6
South Dakota Mines	4	–	5	5	–	6
Adams State	2	–	7	3	–	8
New Mexico Highlands	1	–	8	2	–	9
Fort Lewis	0	–	9	0	–	11
$ – Conference champion; ^ – NCAA Division II playoff participant; Rankings from AFCA Poll

The 2023 Colorado Mines Orediggers football team was an American football team that represented the Colorado School of Mines in the Rocky Mountain Athletic Conference (RMAC) during the 2023 NCAA Division II football season. In their first year under head coach Pete Sterbick, the team compiled a 14–1 record (9–0 against conference opponents), outscored opponents by a total of 656 to 150, and won the RMAC championship. The team was led on offense by quarterback John Matocha who broke the NCAA record for career touchdowns, won the 2022 Harlon Hill Trophy and was a finalist for the award again in 2023.

The 2022 Orediggers advanced to the national championship game where they lost to Ferris State. Coach Sterbick noted that, having lost the 2022 championship game, the Orediggers have "an extra chip on our shoulders" to win the school's first national championship in 2023. The team opened its season ranked No. 2 nationally and defeated No. 3 Grand Valley State and No. 4 Angelo State in its first two games. The Orediggers finished the regular season ranked No. 1 and advanced to the NCAA Division II playoffs where they received a bye in the first round, and defeated Augustana (SD) (56–10) in the second round, Central Washington (38–14) in the quarterfinals, and Kutztown (35–7) in the semifinal. They lost to No. 3 Harding, 38–7, in the Division II national championship game.

The team plays its home games at Alumni Field at Marv Kay Stadium in Golden, Colorado.

== Schedule ==
Date	Time	Opponent	Rank	Site	Result	Attendance	Source
August 31	6:05 p.m.	No. 3 Grand Valley State*	No. 2	Alumni Field at Marv Kay Stadium; Golden, CO	W 31–28	3,767	
September 9	6:00 p.m.	at No. 4 Angelo State*	No. 2	LeGrand Stadium at 1st Community Credit Union Field; San Angelo, TX	W 31–21	3,869	
September 16	12:03 p.m.	Adams State	No. 2	Alumni Field at Marv Kay Stadium; Golden, CO	W 70–7	3,275	
September 23	2:02 p.m.	at CSU Pueblo	No. 2	Thunder Bowl; Pueblo, CO	W 55–14	5,988	
September 30	12:05 p.m.	Chadron State^{†}	No. 2	Alumni Field at Marv Kay Stadium; Golden, CO	W 35–7	4,764	
October 7	1:06 p.m.	at Colorado Mesa	No. 2	Stocker Stadium; Grand Junction, CO	W 52–0	2,412	
October 14	12:04 p.m.	South Dakota Mines	No. 2	Alumni Field at Marv Kay Stadium; Golden, CO	W 45–22	3,037	
October 21	1:00 p.m.	at Black Hills State	No. 1	Lyle Hare Stadium; Spearfish, SD	W 42–17	2,734	
October 28	12:05 p.m.	No. 9 Western Colorado	No. 1	Alumni Field at Marv Kay Stadium; Golden, CO	W 42–7	5,565	
November 4	12:04 p.m.	New Mexico Highlands	No. 1	Alumni Field at Marv Kay Stadium; Golden, CO	W 77–3	3,562	
November 11	12:00 p.m.	at Fort Lewis	No. 1	Ray Dennison Memorial Field; Durango, CO	W 82–0	1,453	
November 25	12:01 p.m.	No. 16 Augustana (SD)*	No. 1	Alumni Field at Marv Kay Stadium; Golden, CO (NCAA Division II Second Round)	W 56–10	4,378	
December 2	12:01 p.m.	Central Washington*	No. 1	Alumni Field at Marv Kay Stadium; Golden, CO (NCAA Division II Quarterfinal)	W 38–14	4,328	
December 9	1:30 p.m.	Kutztown*	No. 1	Alumni Field at Marv Kay Stadium; Golden, CO (NCAA Division II Semifinal)	W 35–7	5,294	
December 16	11:00 a.m.	vs. No. 3 Harding	No. 1	McKinney ISD Stadium; McKinney, TX (NCAA Division II Championship Game)	L 7–38	12,552	
*Non-conference game; ^{†}Homecoming; Rankings from AFCA Poll released prior to the game; All times are in Mountain time

== Rankings ==
Ranking movements Legend: ██ Increase in ranking ██ Decrease in ranking ( ) = First-place votes
	Week												
Poll	Pre	1	2	3	4	5	6	7	8	9	10	11	Final
AFCA	2	2 (1)	2 (1)	2 (7)	2 (6)	2 (3)	2 (3)	1 (28)	1 (28)	1 (26)	1 (26)	1 (27)	2
D2 Football	4	2	2	2	2	2	2	1	1	1	1	1	2

== Personnel ==
2023 Colorado Mines Orediggers football team roster
Players
Coaches
Offense

Pos.	#	Name	Class
QB	2	Evan Foster	Sr
WR	3	Max McLeod	Sr
RB	4	Braelon Tate	Fr
WR	6	Billy Pospisil III	Jr
RB	7	Landon Walker	So
WR	9	Zach Hoffman	Sr
QB	10	John Matocha (C)	Sr
QB	11	Jake Sype	So
WR	12	John Krause	Sr
WR	14	Flynn Schiele	So
QB	16	Sean McNair	So
QB	18	Brock Zanetell	Fr
WR	19	Nick Stone	Fr
RB	22	Konnor Mickelsen	So
RB	28	Noah Roper	Sr

Defense

Pos.	#	Name	Class
CB	1	Cam Forrest	Sr
SS	5	Blake Ramsey	Sr
DE	8	Zach Hester	Sr
FS	13	Evan Perilloux	Sr
ILB	15	Adrian Moreno	Sr
FS	17	Logan Rayburn (C)	Sr
CB	20	Will Drogosch	Jr
OLB	21	Jalen Thomas	Sr
CB	23	Mikee Barker	Jr
FS	24	Joel Diaz	So
CB	25	Collin Romero	Sr
FS	26	Nate Sutter	Sr
DB	27	Devyn Lauer	Fr
CB	29	Jackson Zimmermann	So

Special teams

Pos.	#	Name	Class
K, P	0	Jacob Click	Sr

Head coach

- Pete Sterbick

Coordinators/assistant coaches

- Tim Brandon
  Offensive coordinator
- Tripp Thomas
  Defensive coordinator
- Clement Grinstead
  Running backs/Special teams coordinator
- Ryan Diedrick
  Wide receivers/Pass game coordinator/Recruiting coordinator
- Anthony Makkransky
  Defensive backs/Defensive pass game coordinator
- Scott Groner
  Kickers/Punters
- Drew Adams
  Tight ends
- Shane Nelson
  Linebackers
- Brandon Gamel
  Defensive assistant

Legend

- (C) Team captain
- (S) Suspended
- (I) Ineligible
- Injured
- Redshirt

Roster
Last update: December 29, 2023

== Game summaries ==
=== No. 3 Grand Valley State ===
	1	2	3	4	Total
No. 3 Lakers	7	0	0	21	28
No. 2 Orediggers	7	7	14	3	31

Statistics	GVS	CSM
First downs	23	23
Total yards	431	430
Rushing yards	122	103
Passing yards	309	327
Turnovers	2	0
Time of possession	29:44	30:16

Team	Category	Player	Statistics
Grand Valley State	Passing	Cade Peterson	18/35, 295 yards, 2 TD, INT
Grand Valley State	Rushing	Cade Peterson	14 rushes, 51 yards, TD
Grand Valley State	Receiving	Cody Tierney	8 receptions, 151 yards, TD
Colorado Mines	Passing	John Matocha	27/41, 327 yards, 2 TD
Colorado Mines	Rushing	Noah Roper	13 rushes, 60 yards, TD
Colorado Mines	Receiving	Max McLeod	11 receptions, 157 yards

=== At No. 4 Angelo State ===
	1	2	3	4	Total
No. 2 Orediggers	0	3	7	21	31
No. 4 Rams	7	7	0	7	21

Statistics	CSM	ASU
First downs	21	22
Total yards	383	354
Rushing yards	138	76
Passing yards	245	278
Turnovers	0	1
Time of possession	29:59	30:01

Team	Category	Player	Statistics
Colorado Mines	Passing	John Matocha	17/34, 245 yards, TD
Colorado Mines	Rushing	Landon Walker	12 rushes, 66 yards, 2 TD
Colorado Mines	Receiving	Max McLeod	6 receptions, 147 yards, TD
Angelo State	Passing	Gerald Gardner	26/46, 278 yards, 3 TD, INT
Angelo State	Rushing	Kason Philips	9 rushes, 55 yards
Angelo State	Receiving	Kyle Bradford	7 receptions, 94 yards, TD

=== Adams State ===
	1	2	3	4	Total
Grizzlies	0	0	0	0	0
No. 2 Orediggers	0	0	0	0	0

Statistics	ASU	CSM
First downs		
Total yards		
Rushing yards		
Passing yards		
Turnovers		
Time of possession		

Team	Category	Player	Statistics
Adams State	Passing		
Adams State	Rushing		
Adams State	Receiving		
Colorado Mines	Passing		
Colorado Mines	Rushing		
Colorado Mines	Receiving		

=== At CSU Pueblo ===
	1	2	3	4	Total
No. 2 Orediggers	0	0	0	0	0
ThunderWolves	0	0	0	0	0

Statistics	CSM	CSUP
First downs		
Total yards		
Rushing yards		
Passing yards		
Turnovers		
Time of possession		

Team	Category	Player	Statistics
Colorado Mines	Passing		
Colorado Mines	Rushing		
Colorado Mines	Receiving		
CSU Pueblo	Passing		
CSU Pueblo	Rushing		
CSU Pueblo	Receiving		

=== Chadron State ===
	1	2	3	4	Total
Eagles	0	0	0	0	0
No. 2 Orediggers	0	0	0	0	0

Statistics	CSC	CSM
First downs		
Total yards		
Rushing yards		
Passing yards		
Turnovers		
Time of possession		

Team	Category	Player	Statistics
Chadron State	Passing		
Chadron State	Rushing		
Chadron State	Receiving		
Colorado Mines	Passing		
Colorado Mines	Rushing		
Colorado Mines	Receiving		

== "College football's nerdiest contender" ==
Colorado Mines' football team, drawn from its student body of engineering students, has gained attention both for its ability on the field and for its nerdy and colorful characters. In November 2023, The Wall Street Journal profiled quarterback John Matocha, a computer science major, as the leader of "college football's nerdiest contender." 5280 magazine profiled the team's official headshots including Matocha in pigtails and a drawn-on blue mustache; safety Blake Ramsey sporting a tonsure, friar-style haircut; linebacker Owen Marnell in Harry Potter cosplay; and tight end Kenny Wright with emo-style black bangs combed over one of his eyes.

== Statistical achievements and honors ==
Through their December 9 semifinal match with Kutztown, the Orediggers have scored 691 points, an average of 49.36 points per game, and have gained an average of 520.6 yards of total offense per game. On defense, they have held opponents to 157 points (11.21 points per game) and 247.1 yards of total offense per game. The team's individual statistical leaders include:

- Redshirt senior quarterback John Matocha won the Harlon Hill Trophy, considered the Division II equivalent of the Heisman Trophy, in 2022, and was a finalist for the award in 2023. On November 11, 2023, Matocha broke the NCAA record for career touchdowns at all levels of play, as he tallied four touchdowns (three passing, one rushing), bringing his career total to 181. Through the first 14 games of the 2023 season, Matocha has tallied 4,028 passing yards and 42 touchdowns.
- Redshirt senior wide receiver Max McLeod leads the team with 1,503 receiving yards and 16 touchdowns.
- Redshirt senior running back Noah Roper leads the team with 951 rushing yards.
- Redshirt senior placekicker Hunter Pearson leads the team with 114 points scored.
- Redshirt junior outside linebacker Jaden Healy leads the team with 63 total tackles.
- Redshirt sophomore cornerback Jackson Zimmerman leads the team with six interceptions and nine pass breakups.
- Redshirt senior outside linebacker Nolan Reeve leads the team with ten sacks and 13.5 tackles for loss.
