= Josh Lamberson =

American football player and coach (born 1982)

Current position
- Title: Head coach
- Team: Central Missouri
- Conference: MIAA
- Record: 29–18

Biographical details
- Born: September 1, 1982 (age 44); Wilber, Nebraska, U.S.

Playing career
- 2001–2005: Northwest Missouri State
- Position: Quarterback

Coaching career (HC unless noted)
- 2006–2008: Northwest Missouri State (GA/QB)
- 2008–2010: Southeastern Oklahoma State (QB)
- 2010–2014: Central Missouri (OC)
- 2015–2016: Nebraska–Kearney
- 2017–2021: Abilene Christian (AHC/OC)
- 2022–present: Central Missouri

Head coaching record
- Overall: 30–39
- Bowls: 1–0
- Tournaments: 1–1 (NCAA D-II playoffs)

Accomplishments and honors

Championships
- 1 MIAA (2023)

Awards
- As a coach: MIAA Coach of the Year (2023); As a player: Third-team All-American (2005); 2× Second-team All-MIAA (2004, 2005); NWMSU M-Club Hall of Fame (2015)

Joshua Lamberson (born September 1, 1982) is an American college football coach and former player. He is the head football coach for the University of Central Missouri, a position he has held since 2022. He was previously the assistant head football coach and offensive coordinator at Abilene Christian University in Abilene, Texas. Prior to taking this position on December 21, 2016, he served as the head football coach at the University of Nebraska at Kearney in Kearney, Nebraska. Lamberson was announced as the new head coach on December 14, 2014, replacing Darrell Morris. Before becoming head coach at UNK, Lamberson served as the offensive coordinator at Central Missouri from 2010 to 2014. He served as a graduate assistant at Northwest Missouri State from 2006 to 2008, and as the offensive coordinator and recruiting coach at Southeastern Oklahoma State from 2008 to 2010.

== Playing career ==
Lamberson was an All-American quarterback for Northwest Missouri State, leading the Bearcats to the National Championship game in 2005. Lamberson was also the ESPN Academic All-American Football National Player of the Year in 2005 as a senior, as well as the Disney Sportsman of the Year. Lamberson won the Ken B. Jones Award as the MIAA's top male student-athlete in 2005, as well.

== Personal life ==
Lamberson and his wife, Mandy, have a two-year-old daughter, Kiya and a newborn son, Ace.

== Head coaching record ==
Year	Team	Overall	Conference	Standing	Bowl/playoffs	AFCA^{#}	D2^{°}
Nebraska–Kearney Lopers (Mid-America Intercollegiate Athletics Association) (2015–2016)
2015	Nebraska–Kearney	0–11	0–11	12th			
2016	Nebraska–Kearney	1–10	1–10	11th			
Nebraska–Kearney:		1–21	1–21				
Central Missouri Mules (Mid-America Intercollegiate Athletics Association) (2022–present)
2022	Central Missouri	4–7	4–7	T–8th			
2023	Central Missouri	11–2	9–1	T–1st	L NCAA Division II Second Round	6	4
2024	Central Missouri	9–3	6–3	T–3rd	W Heritage		17
2025	Central Missouri	5–6	5–4	T–4th			
Central Missouri:		29–18	24–15				
Total:		30–39					
