= Pete Sterbick =

American football player and coach (born c. 1979)

Current position
- Title: Offensive coordinator
- Team: Montana State
- Conference: Big Sky

Biographical details
- Born: August 7, 1979 (age 47)

Playing career
- 1998–2002: Augustana (SD)
- Position: Wide receiver

Coaching career (HC unless noted)
- 2003: Missouri Western (WR)
- 2004: North Dakota (GA/TE)
- 2005–2007: Washington State (GA)
- 2008–2011: Grand View (OC/WR)
- 2012–2013: McPherson
- 2014–2018: Montana Tech (OC/QB/RB)
- 2019–2022: Colorado Mines (OC/QB)
- 2023–2024: Colorado Mines
- 2025–present: Montana State (OC/QB)

Head coaching record
- Overall: 31–15
- Tournaments: 3–1 (NCAA D-II playoffs)

Accomplishments and honors

Championships
- 1 RMAC (2023)

Awards
- Division II AFCA Region 5 Coach of the Year (2023); Footballscoop.com NCAA Division II Coordinator of the Year (2022)

Pete Sterbick (born August 7, 1979) is an American college football coach and former player. He is the offensive coordinator for Montana State University.

== Playing career ==
Sterbick played college football at Augustana College—now known as Augustana University—in Sioux Falls, South Dakota, from 1998 to 2002. He was a wide receiver and also punted.

== Coaching career ==
=== Colorado Mines ===
Sterbick was hired as the head football coach in the spring of 2023. Mines won the Rocky Mountain Athletic Conference (RMAC) title in 2023, finished the regular season 11–0, and ranked No. 1 in the country. They were defeated in the national championship by Harding University, and finished the season 14–1. Quarterback John Matocha finished as the all-time NCAA leader in touchdown passes (162) and touchdowns accounted for (191). Sterbick was the offensive coordinator and quarterback coach at Mines from 2019 to 2022, and Mines won the Rocky Mountain Athletic Conference (RMAC) titles in 2019, 2021, and 2022. In 2022, Mines finished 13–3 and played for the NCAA Division II national championship, losing to Ferris State. Quarterback John Matocha won the Harlon Hill Trophy, the equivalent to the Heisman Trophy, awarded to the best player in NCAA Division II football. Sterbick was named D-II national coordinator of the year by footballscoop.com, as the offense led D-II in scoring with 44.6 points per game. In 2021, Mines finished 12–2, and made it to the NCAA Division II semifinals before losing to Valdosta State. In 2019, Mines completed a 11–0 regular season record before losing in the second round of the NCAA Division II playoffs to Texas A&M University–Commerce to finish 12–1 on the season.

=== Pre-Colorado Mines ===
Sterbick previously was the offensive coordinator at Montana Tech. Montana Tech won the Frontier Conference championships in 2015 and 2016 and made it to the quarterfinals of the NAIA playoffs, finishing each season with a record of 10–2. In 2017, the Tech offense set an NAIA record with 932 yards of offense in a single game. In 2012 and 2013, Sterbick served as the head football coach at McPherson College in McPherson, Kansas. His record at McPherson was 9–11. Before being hired at McPherson College, he was the offensive coordinator for Grand View University in Des Moines, Iowa for four years, where he helped start the program. Prior to Grand View, he was a graduate assistant at Washington State University for three seasons.

== Head coaching record ==
Year	Team	Overall	Conference	Standing	Bowl/playoffs	AFCA^{#}	D2^{°}
McPherson Bulldogs (Kansas Collegiate Athletic Conference) (2012–2013)
2012	McPherson	4–5	4–4	6th			
2013	McPherson	5–6	4–5	5th			
McPherson:		9–11	8–9				
Colorado Mines Orediggers (Rocky Mountain Athletic Conference) (2023–2024)
2023	Colorado Mines	14–1	9–0	1st	L NCAA Division II Championship	2	2
2024	Colorado Mines	8–3	6–3	T–3rd			
Colorado Mines:		22–4	15–3				
Total:		31–15					
