= John Matocha =

American gridiron football player

Profile
- Position: Quarterback

Personal information
- Born: November 2, 2000 (age 26); Magnolia, Texas, U.S.
- Listed height: 5 ft 11 in (1.80 m)
- Listed weight: 180 lb (82 kg)

Career information
- High school: Magnolia West
- College: Colorado Mines (2019–2023)
- NFL draft: 2024: undrafted

Career history
- Toronto Argonauts (2024)*
- * Offseason or practice squad member only

Awards and highlights
- NCAA Division II all-time total touchdowns leader; Division II Academic All-American of the Year (2023); Harlon Hill Trophy (2022); 2× Division II football Academic All-American (2021, 2022); 3× RMAC Offensive Player of the Year (2021–2023); RMAC Offensive Freshman of the Year (2019); 3× First-team All-RMAC (2019, 2022, 2023); Second-team All-RMAC (2021)
- Stats at CFL.ca

John Matocha (born November 2, 2000) is an American former professional football quarterback. He played college football for the Colorado Mines Orediggers. He was a member of the Toronto Argonauts of the Canadian Football League (CFL).

== Early life ==
Matocha grew up in Magnolia, Texas and attended Magnolia West High School. As a senior, he completed 66 percent of his passes for 3,441 yards and 38 touchdowns and also rushed for 868 yards and 15 touchdowns.

== College career ==
Matocha became the Colorado Mines Orediggers' starting quarterback two games into his freshman season. He was named first-team All-Rocky Mountain Athletic Conference (RMAC) and the conference's Offensive Freshman of the Year after passing for 2,825 yards with 29 touchdown passes and five interceptions while also rushing for 598 yards and 11 touchdowns. Matocha's sophomore season was canceled due to COVID-19.

In 2021, Matocha passed for 3,105 yards and 38 touchdowns and was named the RMAC Offensive Player of the Year. Matocha was also named a first-team Division II football Academic All-American by the College Sports Information Directors of America, since renamed College Sports Communicators (CSC). He repeated as the RMAC Offensive Player of the Year and won the Harlon Hill Trophy as the best player in NCAA Division II in 2022. Matocha finished the season with 4,778 passing yards and 52 touchdown passes. After the season, Matocha was named the Division II football Academic All-American of the Year by CSC, and was later named the Academic All-American of the Year for all Division II sports for the 2022–23 school year.

On November 11, 2023, in the Orediggers' season finale against Fort Lewis College, Matocha scored four total touchdowns in an 82–0 win, raising his career total to 181, and making him the all-time total touchdowns leader in all of college football.

=== Statistics ===
Year	Team	Games		Passing								Rushing			
Year	Team	GP	Record	Comp	Att	Pct	Yards	Avg	TD	Int	Rate	Att	Yards	Avg	TD
2019	Colorado Mines	12	11–1	252	342	73.7	2,825	8.3	29	5	168.1	145	598	4.1	11
2020	Colorado Mines	DNP													
2021	Colorado Mines	14	12–2	260	382	68.1	3,105	8.1	38	8	165.0	154	492	3.2	7
2022	Colorado Mines	16	13–3	348	506	68.8	4,778	9.4	52	8	178.8	133	443	3.3	5
2023	Colorado Mines	15	14–1	333	471	70.7	4,298	9.1	43	7	174.5	106	449	4.2	5
Career		57	50−7	1,193	1,701	70.1	15,006	8.8	162	28	172.4	538	1,982	3.7	28

== Professional career ==
Pre-draft measurables
Height	Weight	Arm length	Hand span	40-yard dash	10-yard split	20-yard split	20-yard shuttle	Three-cone drill	Vertical jump
5 ft 11 1/8 in (1.81 m)	192 lb (87 kg)	29 7/8 in (0.76 m)	8 7/8 in (0.23 m)	4.88 s	1.69 s	2.75 s	4.38 s	7.27 s	31.0 in (0.79 m)
All values from Pro Day

Matocha went undrafted in the 2024 NFL draft, but was invited to rookie minicamp with the Denver Broncos.

On May 27, 2024, it was announced that Matocha had signed with the Toronto Argonauts of the Canadian Football League. However, he was part of the final training camp cuts on June 1, 2024.
