= 2023 NCAA Division II football rankings =

Rankings for the 2023 NCAA Division II football season

- Season: 2023
- Postseason: Single-elimination
- Preseason No. 1: Ferris State
- National champions: Harding
- Conference with most teams in final AFCA poll: NSIC (4)

The 2023 National Collegiate Athletic Association (NCAA) Division II football rankings consists primarily of The AFCA Coaches' Poll, determined by coaches part of NCAA Division II football programs. The following weekly polls determine the top 25 teams at the NCAA Division II level of college football for the 2023 season.

== Legend ==
	Increase in ranking
	Decrease in ranking
	Not ranked previous week or no change
	Selected for College Football Playoff
(#–#)	Win–loss record
(Italics)	Number of first place votes
т	Tied with team above or below also with this symbol

== American Football Coaches Association (AFCA) poll ==
	Preseason August 14	Week 1 September 5	Week 2 September 11	Week 3 September 18	Week 4 September 25	Week 5 October 2	Week 6 October 9	Week 7 October 16	Week 8 October 23	Week 9 October 30	Week 10 November 6	Week 11 November 13	Week 12 (Final)	
1.	Ferris State (29)	Ferris State (1–0) (27)	Ferris State (2–0) (27)	Ferris State (2–1) (23)	Ferris State (2–1) (23)	Ferris State (3–1) (26)	Ferris State (4–1) (27)	Colorado Mines (7–0) (28)	Colorado Mines (8–0) (28)	Colorado Mines (9–0) (26)	Colorado Mines (10–0) (26)	Colorado Mines (11–0) (27)	Harding (15–0) (28)	1.
2.	Colorado Mines	Colorado Mines (1–0) (1)	Colorado Mines (2–0) (1)	Colorado Mines (3–0) (7)	Colorado Mines (4–0) (6)	Colorado Mines (5–0) (3)	Colorado Mines (6–0) (3)	Pittsburg State (7–0)	Pittsburg State (8–0)	Pittsburg State (9–0) (1)	Grand Valley State (8–1) т	Grand Valley State (9–1)	Colorado Mines (14–1)	2.
3.	Grand Valley State	Pittsburg State (1–0)	Pittsburg State (2–0)	Pittsburg State (3–0)	Pittsburg State (4–0)	Pittsburg State (5–0)	Pittsburg State (6–0)	Minnesota State (7–0)	Grand Valley State (6–1)	Grand Valley State (7–1) (1)	Harding (10–0) (1) т	Harding (11–0) (1)	Grand Valley State (11–2)	3.
4.	Pittsburg State	Angelo State (1–0)	West Florida (2–0)	Ouachita Baptist (3–0)	Minnesota State (4–0)	Minnesota State (5–0)	Minnesota State (6–0)	Grand Valley State (5–1)	Harding (8–0)	Harding (9–0)	Slippery Rock (10–0) (1)	Benedict (11–0) (1)	Lenoir–Rhyne (13–2)	4.
5.	Angelo State	NW Missouri State (1–0)	Ouachita Baptist (2–0)	Minnesota State (3–0)	Ouachita Baptist (4–0)	Ouachita Baptist (5–0)	Ouachita Baptist (6–0)	Delta State (7–0)	Benedict (8–0)	Slippery Rock (9–0) (1)	Benedict (10–0)	Ferris State (8–2)	Pittsburg State (11–2)	5.
6.	NW Missouri State	West Florida (1–0)	Minnesota State (2–0)	Grand Valley State (2–1)	West Florida (3–1)	West Florida (4–1)	West Florida (5–1)	Harding (7–0)	Slippery Rock (8–0) (1)	Benedict (9–0)	Ferris State (7–2)	Central Missouri (10–1)	Central Missouri (11–2)	6.
7.	West Florida	Grand Valley State (0–1)	Grand Valley State (1–1)	West Florida (2–1)	Grand Valley State (2–1)	Grand Valley State (3–1)	Grand Valley State (4–1)	Slippery Rock (7–0)	Lenoir–Rhyne (8–0)	Ferris State (6–2)	Central Missouri (9–1)	Pittsburg State (10–1)	Kutztown (12–3)	7.
8.	Ouachita Baptist	Ouachita Baptist (1–0)	Delta State (2–0)	Delta State (3–0)	Delta State (4–0)	Delta State (5–0)	Delta State (6–0)	Benedict (7–0)	Ferris State (5–2)	Indianapolis (8–0)	Pittsburg State (9–1)	Delta State (9–1)	Valdosta State (12–2)	8.
9.	Minnesota State	Minnesota State (1–0)	Angelo State (1–1)	Bemidji State (3–0)	Bemidji State (4–0)	Harding (5–0)	Harding (6–0)	Ferris State (4–2)	Western Colorado (8–0)	Davenport (8–0)	Minnesota State (9–1)	Tiffin (11–0)	Ferris State (8–3)	9.
10.	Delta State	Delta State (1–0)	Bemidji State (2–0)	Harding (3–0)	Harding (4–0)	Slippery Rock (5–0)	Slippery Rock (6–0)	Lenoir–Rhyne (7–0)	Indianapolis (7–0)	Minnesota State (8–1)	Ouachita Baptist (9–1)	Western Colorado (10–1)	Slippery Rock (12–2)	10.
11.	Bemidji State	Bemidji State (1–0)	Harding (2–0)	Emporia State (3–0)	Emporia State (4–0)	Benedict (5–0) (1)	Benedict (6–0) (1)	Indianapolis (6–0)	Davenport (7–0)	Central Missouri (8–1)	Delta State (8–1)	Lenoir–Rhyne (10–1)	Delta State (10–2)	11.
12.	Ashland	Harding (1–0)	Emporia State (2–0)	Slippery Rock (3–0)	Slippery Rock (4–0)	Indianapolis (4–0)	Lenoir–Rhyne (6–0)	Western Colorado (7–0)	Augustana (SD) (8–0)	Ouachita Baptist (8–1)	Bemidji State (8–1)	Texas–Permian Basin (10–1)	Benedict (11–1)	12.
13.	Shepherd	IUP (1–0)	Slippery Rock (2–0)	Shepherd (3–0)	Benedict (4–0)	Lenoir–Rhyne (5–0)	Indianapolis (5–0)	Davenport (6–0)	Minnesota State (7–1)	Bemidji State (7–1)	Western Colorado (9–1)	Virginia Union (10–1)	Augustana (SD) (11–2)	13.
14.	Harding	Shepherd (1–0)	Shepherd (2–0)	Benedict (3–0)	Indianapolis (3–0)	Bemidji State (4–1)	Western Colorado (6–0)	Ouachita Baptist (6–1)	Ouachita Baptist (7–1)	Delta State (7–1)	Tiffin (10–0)	Valdosta State (10–1)	Tiffin (11–1)	14.
15.	Slippery Rock	Slippery Rock (1–0)	NW Missouri State (1–1)	Virginia Union (3–0)	Lenoir–Rhyne (4–0)	Western Colorado (5–0)	Bemidji State (4–1)	Bemidji State (5–1)	Central Missouri (7–1)	Western Colorado (8–1)	Lenoir–Rhyne (9–1)	Slippery Rock (10–1)	Western Colorado (10–2)	15.
16.	IUP	Benedict (1–0) (1)	Benedict (2–0)	Indianapolis (2–0)	Texas A&M–Kingsville (3–0)	Davenport (4–0)	Davenport (5–0)	Central Missouri (6–1)	Bemidji State (6–1) т	Lenoir–Rhyne (8–1)	Davenport (8–1)	Augustana (SD) (10–1)	Bemidji State (9–3)	16.
17.	Benedict (1)	Virginia Union (1–0)	Virginia Union (2–0) (1)	Lenoir–Rhyne (3–0)	Western Colorado (4–0)	Minnesota Duluth (5–0)	Central Missouri (5–1)	Augustana (SD) (7–0)	Delta State (7–1) т	Tiffin (9–0)	Texas–Permian Basin (9–1)	Indianapolis (9–1) т	Central Washington (9–4)	17.
18.	Virginia Union	Emporia State (1–0)	Indianapolis (1–0)	Texas A&M–Kingsville (3–0)	Davenport (3–0)	Central Missouri (4–1)	Henderson State (5–1)	West Florida (5–2)	West Florida (6–2)	Texas–Permian Basin (8–1)	Virginia Union (9–1) (1)	Minnesota Duluth (9–2) т	Texas–Permian Basin (10–2)	18.
19.	Emporia State	Indianapolis (1–0)	Assumption (2–0)	Western Colorado (3–0)	Minnesota Duluth (4–0)	Valdosta State (5–0)	Truman (6–0)	Angelo State (4–2)	Tiffin (8–0)	Virginia Union (8–1)	Valdosta State (9–1)	Minnesota State (9–2)	Charleston (WV) (10–2)	19.
20.	Indianapolis	West Georgia (1–0)	Lenoir–Rhyne (2–0)	Henderson State (3–0)	Angelo State (2–2)	Emporia State (4–1)	Angelo State (3–2)	Virginia State (7–0) (1)	Shepherd (7–1)	Valdosta State (8–1)	Augustana (SD) (9–1)	Ouachita Baptist (9–2)	Virginia Union (10–2)	20.
21.	Wingate	Ashland (0–1)	Texas A&M–Kingsville (2–0)	Davenport (2–0)	Central Missouri (3–1)	Angelo State (3–2)	Assumption (4–1)	Assumption (5–1)	Truman (7–1)	Augustana (SD) (8–1)	Missouri Western (8–2)	Bemidji State (8–2)	Minnesota State (9–3)	21.
22.	West Georgia	Wingate (1–0)	CSU Pueblo (1–1)	Angelo State (1–2)	Valdosta State (4–0)	Henderson State (4–1)	Augustana (SD) (6–0)	Shepherd (6–1)	Texas–Permian Basin (7–1)	Virginia State (8–1)	Indianapolis (8–1)	Davenport (8–2)	Indianapolis (9–2)	22.
23.	Assumption	Assumption (1–0)	Henderson State (2–0)	Minnesota Duluth (3–0)	Assumption (2–1)	Assumption (3–1)	Shepherd (5–1)	Tiffin (7–0)	Virginia Union (7–1)	Missouri Western (7–2)	Central Washington (7–2)	West Florida (8–3)	West Florida (8–4)	23.
24.	Newberry	Lenoir–Rhyne (1–0)	Davenport (2–0)	Assumption (2–1)	Henderson State (3–1)	Truman (5–0)	Virginia State (6–0)	Emporia State (5–2)	Valdosta State (7–1)	Central Washington (7–2)	Minnesota Duluth (8–2)	Charleston (WV) (9–1)	Henderson State (9–3)	24.
25.	Lenoir–Rhyne	CSU Pueblo (1–0)	Western Colorado (2–0)	Central Missouri (2–1)	Shepherd (3–1)	Shepherd (4–1)	Emporia State (4–2)	Truman (6–1)	Minnesota Duluth (7–1)	Mars Hill (7–1)	West Florida (7–3)	Henderson State (9–2)	Minnesota–Duluth (9–2)	25.
	Preseason August 14	Week 1 September 5	Week 2 September 11	Week 3 September 18	Week 4 September 25	Week 5 October 2	Week 6 October 9	Week 7 October 16	Week 8 October 23	Week 9 October 30	Week 10 November 6	Week 11 November 13	Week 12 (Final)	
		Dropped: Newberry	Dropped: IUP; West Georgia; Ashland; Wingate	Dropped: NW Missouri State; CSU Pueblo	Dropped: Virginia Union	Dropped: Texas A&M–Kingsville	Dropped: Minnesota Duluth; Valdosta State	Dropped: Henderson State	Dropped: Angelo State; Virginia State; Assumption; Emporia State	Dropped: West Florida; Shepherd; Truman; Minnesota Duluth	Dropped: Virginia State; Mars Hill	Dropped: Missouri Western; Central Washington	Dropped: Ouachita Baptist; Davenport	

== D2Football.com poll ==
	Preseason August 20	Week 1 September 4	Week 2 September 11	Week 3 September 18	Week 4 September 25	Week 5 October 2	Week 6 October 9	Week 7 October 16	Week 8 October 23	Week 9 October 30	Week 10 November 6	Week 11 November 13	Week 12 (Final) December 19	
1.	Ferris State	Ferris State (1–0)	Ferris State (2–0)	Ferris State (2–1)	Ferris State (2–1)	Ferris State (3–1)	Ferris State (4–1)	Colorado Mines (7–0)	Colorado Mines (8–0)	Colorado Mines (9–0)	Colorado Mines (10–0)	Colorado Mines (11–0)	Harding (15–0)	1.
2.	Grand Valley State	Colorado Mines (1–0)	Colorado Mines (2–0)	Colorado Mines (3–0)	Colorado Mines (4–0)	Colorado Mines (5–0)	Colorado Mines (6–0)	Grand Valley State (5–1)	Grand Valley State (6–1)	Grand Valley State (7–1)	Grand Valley State (8–1)	Grand Valley State (9–1)	Colorado Mines (14–1)	2.
3.	Pittsburg State	Pittsburg State (1–0)	Pittsburg State (2–0)	Pittsburg State (3–0)	Pittsburg State (4–0)	Pittsburg State (5–0)	Pittsburg State (6–0)	Pittsburg State (7–0)	Pittsburg State (8–0)	Pittsburg State (9–0)	Ferris State (7–2)	Ferris State (8–2)	Grand Valley State (11–2)	3.
4.	Colorado Mines	Grand Valley State (0–1)	Grand Valley State (1–1)	Grand Valley State (2–1)	Grand Valley State (2–1)	Grand Valley State (3–1)	Grand Valley State (4–1)	Minnesota State (7–0)	Ferris State (5–2)	Ferris State (6–2)	Harding (10–0)	Harding (11–0)	Central Missouri (11–2)	4.
5.	NW Missouri State	NW Missouri State (1–0)	Minnesota State (2–0)	Minnesota State (3–0)	Minnesota State (4–0)	Minnesota State (5–0)	Minnesota State (6–0)	Ferris State (4–2)	Harding (8–0)	Harding (9–0)	Slippery Rock (10–0)	Pittsburg State (10–1)	Pittsburg State (11–2)	5.
6.	Angelo State	Angelo State (1–0)	West Florida (2–0)	Delta State (3–0)	Delta State (4–0)	Delta State (5–0)	Delta State (6–0)	Delta State (7–0)	Slippery Rock (8–0)	Slippery Rock (9–0)	Benedict (10–0)	Benedict (11–0)	Ferris State (8–3)	6.
7.	Minnesota State	Minnesota State (1–0)	Bemidji State (2–0)	Bemidji State (3–0)	Bemidji State (4–0)	West Florida (4–1)	West Florida (5–1)	Harding (7–0)	Lenoir–Rhyne (8–0)	Benedict (9–0)	Pittsburg State (9–1)	Central Missouri (10–1)	Lenoir–Rhyne (13–2)	7.
8.	West Florida	West Florida (1–0)	Delta State (2–0)	West Florida (2–1)	West Florida (3–1)	Ouachita Baptist (5–0)	Ouachita Baptist (6–0)	Slippery Rock (5–1)	West Florida (6–2)	Central Missouri (8–1)	Central Missouri (9–1)	Delta State (9–1)	Kutztown (12–3)	8.
9.	Delta State	Delta State (1–0)	Ouachita Baptist (2–0)	Ouachita Baptist (3–0)	Ouachita Baptist (4–0)	Harding (5–0)	Harding (6–0)	Bemidji State (7–0)	Benedict (8–0)	Bemidji State (7–1)	Bemidji State (8–1)	Augustana (SD) (10–1)	Valdosta State (12–2)	9.
10.	Bemidji State	Bemidji State (1–0)	Angelo State (1–1)	Emporia State (3–0)	Emporia State (4–0)	Slippery Rock (5–0)	Slippery Rock (6–0)	Benedict (7–0)	Augustana (SD) (8–0)	Minnesota State (8–1)	Minnesota State (9–1)	Texas–Permian Basin (10–1)	Central Washington (9–4)	10.
11.	Ouachita Baptist	Ouachita Baptist (1–0)	Emporia State (2–0)	Harding (3–0)	Harding (4–0)	Bemidji State (4–1)	Bemidji State (4–1)	Lenoir–Rhyne (7–0)	Central Missouri (7–1)	Indianapolis (8–0)	Delta State (8–1)	Lenoir–Rhyne (10–1)	Slippery Rock (12–2)	11.
12.	IUP	IUP (1–0)	Harding (2–0)	Slippery Rock (3–0)	Slippery Rock (4–0)	Benedict (5–0)	Benedict (6–0)	Indianapolis (6–0)	Bemidji State (6–1)	Delta State (7–1)	Ouachita Baptist (9–1)	Western Colorado (10–1)	Bemidji State (9–3)	12.
13.	Shepherd	Harding (1–0)	NW Missouri State (1–1)	Benedict (3–0)	Benedict (4–0)	Lenoir–Rhyne (5–0)	Lenoir–Rhyne (6–0)	West Florida (5–2)	Western Colorado (8–0)	Davenport (8–0)	Lenoir–Rhyne (9–1)	Slippery Rock (10–1)	Delta State (10–2)	13.
14.	Ashland	Shepherd (1–0)	Slippery Rock (2–0)	Shepherd (3–0)	Lenoir–Rhyne (4–0)	Indianapolis (4–0)	Indianapolis (5–0)	Western Colorado (7–0)	Indianapolis (7–0)	Ouachita Baptist (8–1)	Augustana (SD) (9–1)	Valdosta State (10–1)	Benedict (11–1)	14.
15.	Harding	Emporia State (1–0)	Benedict (2–0)	Lenoir–Rhyne (3–0)	Indianapolis (3–0)	Davenport (4–0)	Western Colorado (6–0)	Davenport (6–0)	Minnesota State (7–1)	Lenoir–Rhyne (8–1)	Western Colorado (9–1)	Bemidji State (8–2)	Augustana (SD) (11–2)	15.
16.	Slippery Rock	Slippery Rock (1–0)	Shepherd (2–0)	Virginia Union (3–0)	Davenport (3–0)	Western Colorado (5–0)	Davenport (5–0)	Ouachita Baptist (6–1)	Delta State (7–1)	Augustana (SD) (8–1)	Texas–Permian Basin (9–1)	Minnesota State (9–2)	Western Colorado (10–2)	16.
17.	Emporia State	Wingate (1–0)	Lenoir–Rhyne (2–0)	Indianapolis (2–0)	Western Colorado (4–0)	Emporia State (4–1)	Central Missouri (5–1)	Central Missouri (6–1)	Davenport (7–0)	Western Colorado (8–1)	Valdosta State (9–1)	Virginia Union (9–1)	Texas–Permian Basin (10–2)	17.
18.	Wingate	West Georgia (1–0)	Virginia Union (2–0)	Davenport (2–0)	IUP (3–1)	Central Missouri (4–1)	Truman State (6–0)	Angelo State (4–2)	Ouachita Baptist (7–1)	Texas–Permian Basin (8–1)	Virginia Union (9–1)	Tiffin (11–0)	Charleston (WV) (10–2)	18.
19.	West Georgia	Ashland (0–1)	Indianapolis (1–0)	IUP (2–1)	Angelo State (2–2)	Angelo State (3–2)	Angelo State (3–2)	Shepherd (6–1)	Texas–Permian Basin (7–1)	Valdosta State (8–1)	Missouri Western (8–2)	West Florida (8–3)	Tiffin (11–1)	19.
20.	Benedict	CSU Pueblo (1–0)	Davenport (2–0)	Western Colorado (3–0)	Texas A&M–Kingsville (3–0)	Truman (5–0)	Shepherd (5–1)	Virginia Union (6–1)	Virginia Union (7–1)	Virginia Union (8–1)	Tiffin (10–0)	Minnesota Duluth (9–2)	Minnesota State (9–3)	20.
21.	Indianapolis	Benedict (1–0)	CSU Pueblo (1–1)	Angelo State (1–2)	Truman (4–0)	Minnesota Duluth (5–0)	Missouri Western (5–1)	Augustana (7–0)	Shepherd (7–1)	West Florida (6–3)	West Florida (7–3)	Indianapolis (9–1)	Indianapolis (9–2)	21.
22.	Virginia Union	Indianapolis (1–0)	IUP (1–1)	Texas A&M–Kingsville (3–0)	Central Missouri (3–1)	Shepherd (4–1)	Virginia Union (5–1)	Truman State (6–1)	Truman State (7–1)	Tiffin (9–0)	Central Washington (7–2)	Ouachita Baptist (9–2)	West Florida (8–4)	22.
23.	Lenoir–Rhyne	Lenoir–Rhyne (1–0)	Assumption (2–0)	Henderson State (3–0)	Shepherd (3–1)	Virginia Union (4–1)	Emporia State (4–2)	Emporia State (5–2)	Tiffin (8–0)	Central Washington (7–2)	Davenport (8–1)	Kutztown (9–2)	Henderson State (9–3)	23.
24.	Davenport	Virginia Union (1–0)	Wingate (1–1)	Truman (3–0)	Virginia Union (3–1)	Missouri Western (4–1)	Augustana (6–0)	Virginia State (7–0)	Valdosta State (7–1)	Missouri Western (7–2)	Indianapolis (8–1)	Henderson State (9–2)	Virginia Union (10–2)	24.
25.	CSU Pueblo	Davenport (1–0)	Saginaw Valley State (2–0)	Central Missouri (2–1)	Minnesota Duluth (4–0)	Valdosta State (5–0)	Virginia State (6–0)	Texas–Permian Basin (6–1)	Central Washington (6–2)	Mars Hill (7–1)	Minnesota Duluth (8–2)	Charleston (WV) (9–1)	Minnesota–Duluth (9–2)	25.
	Preseason August 20	Week 1 September 4	Week 2 September 11	Week 3 September 18	Week 4 September 25	Week 5 October 2	Week 6 October 9	Week 7 October 16	Week 8 October 23	Week 9 October 30	Week 10 November 6	Week 11 November 13	Week 12 (Final) December 19	
		None	Dropped: Ashland; West Georgia	Dropped: NW Missouri State; CSU Pueblo; Assumption; Wingate; Saginaw Valley State	Dropped: Henderson State	Dropped: IUP; Texas A&M–Kingsville	Dropped: Minnesota Duluth; Valdosta State	Dropped: Missouri Western	Dropped: Angelo State; Emporia State; Virginia State	Dropped: Shepherd; Truman State	Dropped: Mars Hill	Dropped: Missouri Western; Davenport; Central Washington	Dropped: Ouachita Baptist	
