= List of Pennsylvania State Athletic Conference football standings =

This is a list of yearly Pennsylvania State Athletic Conference football standings.

== Pennsylvania State standings ==
2012 Pennsylvania State Athletic Conference football standings
	Conf.			Overall
Team	W		L	W		L
East
No. 14 Shippensburg xy^	7	–	0	11	–	2
No. 17 Bloomsburg ^	6	–	1	10	–	2
West Chester	4	–	3	7	–	4
East Stroudsburg	4	–	3	5	–	5
Kutztown	4	–	3	7	–	4
LIU Post	2	–	5	3	–	7
Millersville	1	–	6	2	–	9
Cheyney	0	–	7	1	–	10
West
No. 7 IUP xy$^	6	–	1	12	–	3
Mercyhurst x	6	–	1	9	–	2
California (PA)	5	–	2	8	–	3
Slippery Rock	5	–	2	6	–	5
Edinboro	3	–	4	4	–	6
Clarion	2	–	5	4	–	7
Gannon	1	–	6	3	–	8
Lock Haven	0	–	7	1	–	10
Championship: IUP 41, Shippensburg 10
$ – Conference champion; x – Division champion/co-champions; y – Championship game participant; ^ – NCAA Division II playoff participant; Rankings from AFCA poll

2013 Pennsylvania State Athletic Conference football standings
	Conf.			Overall
Team	W		L	W		L
East
No. 16 Bloomsburg xy$^	6	–	1	10	–	2
No. 4 West Chester x^	6	–	1	13	–	2
Shippensburg x	6	–	1	7	–	4
East Stroudsburg	4	–	3	7	–	4
Kutztown	3	–	4	4	–	7
Lock Haven	2	–	5	3	–	8
Millersville	1	–	6	1	–	10
Cheyney	0	–	7	0	–	11
West
No. 21 Slippery Rock xy^	6	–	1	9	–	3
No. 24 IUP	5	–	2	9	–	2
California (PA)	4	–	3	7	–	4
Mercyhurst	4	–	3	7	–	4
Gannon	4	–	3	6	–	5
Edinboro	3	–	4	5	–	6
Clarion	2	–	5	4	–	7
Seton Hill	0	–	7	1	–	10
Championship: Bloomsburg 42, Slippery Rock 38
$ – Conference champion; x – Division champion/co-champions; y – Championship game participant; ^ – NCAA Division II playoff participant; Rankings from AFCA poll

2014 Pennsylvania State Athletic Conference football standings
	Conf.			Overall
Team	W		L	W		L
East
No. 12 Bloomsburg xy^	9	–	0	11	–	2
No. 15 West Chester ^	8	–	1	11	–	2
East Stroudsburg	5	–	4	6	–	5
Kutztown	5	–	4	6	–	5
Shippensburg	5	–	4	6	–	5
Lock Haven	2	–	7	2	–	9
Millersville	1	–	8	1	–	10
Cheyney	0	–	9	0	–	11
West
Slippery Rock xy$^	7	–	2	9	–	3
Gannon x	7	–	2	9	–	2
California (PA)	6	–	3	8	–	3
Mercyhurst	6	–	3	7	–	4
IUP	5	–	4	6	–	5
Edinboro	2	–	7	3	–	8
Seton Hill	2	–	7	3	–	8
Clarion	2	–	7	2	–	9
Championship: Slippery Rock 28, Bloomsburg 26
$ – Conference champion; x – Division champion/co-champions; y – Championship game participant; ^ – NCAA Division II playoff participant; Rankings from AFCA poll

2015 Pennsylvania State Athletic Conference football standings
	Conf.			Overall
Team	W		L	W		L
East
West Chester xy	6	–	1	7	–	4
Shippensburg	5	–	2	8	–	3
Bloomsburg	5	–	2	7	–	4
Kutztown	5	–	2	7	–	4
East Stroudsburg	4	–	3	6	–	5
Lock Haven	2	–	5	2	–	9
Millersville	1	–	6	2	–	9
Cheyney	0	–	7	0	–	11
West
No. 7 Slippery Rock xy$^	6	–	1	11	–	1
No. 19 IUP x^	6	–	1	9	–	2
California (PA)	5	–	2	8	–	3
Clarion	4	–	3	7	–	4
Gannon	3	–	4	6	–	5
Mercyhurst	2	–	5	5	–	6
Seton Hill	2	–	5	3	–	8
Edinboro	0	–	7	0	–	11
Championship: Slippery Rock 61, West Chester 12
$ – Conference champion; x – Division champion/co-champions; y – Championship game participant; ^ – NCAA Division II playoff participant; Rankings from AFCA poll

2016 Pennsylvania State Athletic Conference football standings
	Conf.			Overall
Team	W		L	W		L
Eastern
Kutztown xy	7	–	0	7	–	4
West Chester	6	–	1	8	–	3
Shippensburg	4	–	3	7	–	4
Bloomsburg	4	–	3	6	–	5
Lock Haven	4	–	3	4	–	7
East Stroudsburg	2	–	5	4	–	7
Millersville	1	–	6	2	–	9
Cheyney	0	–	7	1	–	10
Western
No. 7 California (PA) xy$^	7	–	0	11	–	1
No. 12 IUP ^	6	–	1	10	–	2
Edinboro	5	–	2	9	–	2
Slippery Rock	3	–	4	7	–	4
Clarion	3	–	4	4	–	7
Seton Hill	2	–	5	5	–	6
Gannon	1	–	6	5	–	6
Mercyhurst	1	–	6	3	–	8
Championship: California (PA) 49, Kutztown 7
$ – Conference champion; x – Division champion/co-champions; y – Championship game participant; ^ – NCAA Division II playoff participant; Rankings from AFCA poll

2017 Pennsylvania State Athletic Conference football standings
	Conf.			Overall
Team	W		L	W		L
East
No. 25 Shippensburg x^	6	–	1	10	–	2
West Chester xy^	6	–	1	9	–	4
Kutztown	5	–	2	8	–	3
Bloomsburg	4	–	3	7	–	4
Millersville	3	–	4	4	–	7
East Stroudsburg	2	–	5	3	–	8
Lock Haven	2	–	5	2	–	9
Cheyney	0	–	7	1	–	10
West
No. 3 IUP xy$^	7	–	0	13	–	1
California (PA) ^	5	–	2	9	–	3
Slippery Rock	5	–	2	8	–	3
Edinboro	4	–	3	7	–	4
Gannon	3	–	4	5	–	6
Mercyhurst	3	–	4	5	–	6
Clarion	1	–	6	1	–	10
Seton Hill	0	–	7	0	–	11
Championship: IUP 24, West Chester 7
$ – Conference champion; x – Division champion/co-champions; y – Championship game participant; ^ – NCAA Division II playoff participant; Rankings from AFCA poll

2018 Pennsylvania State Athletic Conference football standings
	Conf.			Overall
Team	W		L	W		L
East
No. 17 West Chester xy$^	6	–	0	10	–	1
Kutztown ^	5	–	1	9	–	2
Bloomsburg	4	–	2	6	–	5
Shippensburg	3	–	3	6	–	5
Millersville	2	–	4	2	–	9
Lock Haven	1	–	5	2	–	9
East Stroudsburg	0	–	6	2	–	9
West
No. 12 Slippery Rock xy^	7	–	0	11	–	3
IUP	5	–	2	8	–	3
California (PA)	5	–	2	7	–	4
Edinboro	3	–	4	6	–	5
Mercyhurst	3	–	4	5	–	6
Clarion	2	–	5	4	–	7
Gannon	2	–	5	2	–	9
Seton Hill	1	–	6	1	–	10
Championship: West Chester 33, Slippery Rock 10
$ – Conference champion; x – Division champion/co-champions; y – Championship game participant; ^ – NCAA Division II playoff participant; Rankings from AFCA poll

2019 Pennsylvania State Athletic Conference football standings
	Conf.			Overall
Team	W		L	W		L
East Division
No. 16 Kutztown xy^	7	–	0	11	–	2
No. 22 Shepherd ^	6	–	1	10	–	3
No. 24 West Chester ^	5	–	2	9	–	3
Shippensburg	4	–	3	4	–	7
Bloomsburg	3	–	4	5	–	6
East Stroudsburg	2	–	5	6	–	5
Millersville	1	–	6	2	–	9
Lock Haven	0	–	7	2	–	9
West Division
No. 6 Slippery Rock xy$^	7	–	0	13	–	1
No. 21 IUP ^	6	–	1	9	–	3
California (PA)	5	–	2	7	–	4
Mercyhurst	3	–	4	6	–	5
Edinboro	3	–	4	3	–	8
Seton Hill	2	–	5	2	–	8
Clarion	1	–	6	3	–	8
Gannon	1	–	6	2	–	9
Championship: Slippery Rock 37, Kutztown 35
$ – Conference champion; x – Division champion/co-champions; y – Championship game participant; ^ – NCAA Division II playoff participant; Rankings from AFCA poll

2021 Pennsylvania State Athletic Conference football standings
	Conf.			Overall
Team	W		L	W		L
East Division
No. 8 Kutztown xy$^	7	–	0	11	–	2
No. 5 Shepherd x^	6	–	1	13	–	2
Shippensburg	5	–	2	9	–	2
West Chester	4	–	3	6	–	5
East Stroudsburg	3	–	4	5	–	6
Bloomsburg	2	–	5	3	–	8
Millersville	1	–	6	2	–	9
Lock Haven	0	–	7	1	–	10
West Division
No. 20 Slippery Rock xy^	6	–	1	9	–	3
No. 21 California (PA) x	5	–	1	9	–	1
IUP	5	–	2	7	–	3
Gannon	3	–	4	5	–	6
Edinboro	3	–	4	4	–	6
Mercyhurst	3	–	4	4	–	7
Seton Hill	2	–	5	5	–	6
Clarion	0	–	6	0	–	10
Championship: Kutztown 38, Slippery Rock 32
$ – Conference champion; x – Division champion/co-champions; y – Championship game participant; ^ – NCAA Division II playoff participant; Rankings from AFCA poll
