= 2017 West Chester Golden Rams football team =

American college football season

1946 West Chester Golden Rams football

PSAC East Division co-champion

PSAC Championship Game, L 7–24 vs IUP

NCAA Division II Second Round, L 10–44 at IUP
- Conference: Pennsylvania State Athletic Conference
- East Division
- Record: 9–4 (6–1 PSAC)
- Head coach: Bill Zwaan (15th season)
- Home stadium: John A. Farrell Stadium

2017 Pennsylvania State Athletic Conference football standings
	Conf.			Overall
Team	W		L	W		L
East
No. 25 Shippensburg x^	6	–	1	10	–	2
West Chester xy^	6	–	1	9	–	4
Kutztown	5	–	2	8	–	3
Bloomsburg	4	–	3	7	–	4
Millersville	3	–	4	4	–	7
East Stroudsburg	2	–	5	3	–	8
Lock Haven	2	–	5	2	–	9
Cheyney	0	–	7	1	–	10
West
No. 3 IUP xy$^	7	–	0	13	–	1
California (PA) ^	5	–	2	9	–	3
Slippery Rock	5	–	2	8	–	3
Edinboro	4	–	3	7	–	4
Gannon	3	–	4	5	–	6
Mercyhurst	3	–	4	5	–	6
Clarion	1	–	6	1	–	10
Seton Hill	0	–	7	0	–	11
Championship: IUP 24, West Chester 7
$ – Conference champion; x – Division champion/co-champions; y – Championship game participant; ^ – NCAA Division II playoff participant; Rankings from AFCA poll

The 2017 West Chester Golden Rams football team represented West Chester University in member of the East Division of the Pennsylvania State Athletic Conference (PSAC) during the 2017 NCAA Division II football season. Led by 15th-year head coach Bill Zwaan, the Golden Rams compiled an overall record of 9–4 with a mark of 6–1 in conference play, sharing the PSAC East Division title with Shippensburg. West Chester advanced to the PSAC Championship Game, where the Golden Rams lost to IUP. The team received a bid to the NCAA Division II Football Championship playoffs, beating Shippensburg in the first round before again losing to IUP in the second round.

== Background ==
=== Previous season ===
In 2016 the Golden Rams finished with an 8–3 including an impressive 6–1 conference record, including a 6-game end of the year winning streak while averaging 33 points per games and holding opponents to under 14 point in each of their last six games.

== Schedule ==
=== Spring game ===
Date	Time	Spring Game	Site	TV	Result	Attendance
April 28	6:00 pm	Purple vs. Gold	John A. Farrell Stadium • West Chester, PA		Purple 24–7	6,899

=== Regular season ===
Date	Time	Opponent	Rank	Site	Result	Attendance
August 31	6:00 p.m.	Bentley*		John A. Farrell Stadium; West Chester, PA	W 51–9	3,218
September 9	6:00 p.m.	at Slippery Rock*	No. 24	Mihalik-Thompson Stadium; Slippery Rock, PA	L 42–49	5,897
September 16	1:00 p.m.	Edinboro*		John A. Farrell Stadium; West Chester, PA	W 62–28	4,567
September 23	2:00 p.m.	at Lock Heven		Hubert Jack Stadium; Lock Haven, PA	W 35–14	2,963
September 30	12:00 p.m.	Kutztown		John A. Farrell Stadium; West Chester, PA	W 27–21	5,674
October 7	1:00 p.m.	at Shippensburg		Seth Grove Stadium; Shippensburg, PA	W 37–27	5,300
October 14	12:00 p.m.	Bloomsburg		John A. Farrell Stadium; West Chester, PA	L 19–20	3,694
October 21	1:00 p.m.	at Cheyney		O'Shields-Stevenson Stadium; Cheyney, PA	W 55–6	887
October 28	2:00 p.m.	East Stroudsburg		John A. Farrell Stadium; West Chester, PA	W 31–26	7,189
November 4	1:00 p.m.	at Millersville		Biemesderfer Stadium; Millersville, PA	W 27–24	2,100
November 11	12:00 p.m.	No. 3 IUP*		John A. Farrell Stadium; West Chester, PA (PSAC Championship Game)	L 7-24	5,234
November 18	12:00 p.m.	at No. 19 Shippensburg		Seth Grove Stadium; Shippensburg, PA (NCAA Division II First Round)	W 27–6	650
November 25	12:00 p.m.	at No. 3 IUP		Miller Stadium; Indiana, PA (NCAA Division II First Round)	L 10–44	1,650
*Non-conference game; Rankings from AFCA Poll released prior to the game; All times are in Eastern time

== Rankings ==
Ranking movements Legend: ██ Increase in ranking ██ Decrease in ranking RV = Received votes
	Week											
Poll	Pre	1	2	3	4	5	6	7	8	9	10	Final
AFCA Coaches	RV	24	RV	RV	RV	RV						
D2football	RV	25	RV	RV	RV	RV						
