= 2017 NCAA Division II football season =

American college football season

- Total No. of teams: 169
- Regular season: August 30 – November 11, 2017
- Playoffs: November 18 – December 16, 2017
- National Championship: Children's Mercy Park; Kansas City, KS; December 16, 2017
- Champion: Texas A&M–Commerce
- Harlon Hill Trophy: Luis Perez (QB, Texas A&M–Commerce)

The 2017 NCAA Division II football season, part of college football in the United States organized by the National Collegiate Athletic Association (NCAA) at the Division II level, began on August 31, 2017 and ended with the Division II championship on December 16, 2017 at Children's Mercy Park in Kansas City, Kansas. Northwest Missouri State were the defending champions from the previous season. Texas A&M–Commerce won the school's first Division II National Championship and second overall, defeating West Florida, 37–27.

Coverage of the Division 2 Playoffs was on ESPN's streaming service, ESPN 3, up until the championship, which was broadcast on ESPN 2.

== D-II wins over FCS teams ==
September 2, 2017 - Virginia State 14, Norfolk State 10
September 2, 2017 - Tuskegee 14, Alabama State 6
September 9, 2017 - Catawba 27, VMI 20
October 14, 2017 - Central State 40, Arkansas-Pine Bluff 35
October 14, 2017 - Tuskegee 33, Jackson State 7

== Conference changes and new programs ==
=== Membership changes ===
School	Former conference	New conference
Brevard Tornadoes	South Atlantic	Independent (D-III)
Davenport Panthers	Independent (NAIA)	GLIAC
Findlay Oilers	GLIAC	G-MAC
Hillsdale Chargers	GLIAC	G-MAC
Lake Erie Storm	GLIAC	G-MAC
Limestone Saints	Independent	South Atlantic
Ohio Dominican Panthers	GLIAC	G-MAC
Oklahoma Panhandle State Aggies	Lone Star	CSFL (NAIA)
Saint Joseph's Pumas	GLVC	School closed
Walsh Cavaliers	GLIAC	G-MAC

Oklahoma Baptist completed their transition to Division II and became eligible for the postseason.

=== Regional realignment ===
The GNAC and NSIC moved from Super Region 3 to Super Region 4, while the GLIAC and GLVC moved in the opposite direction. The newly-expanded G-MAC joined Super Region 1, replacing the CIAA, which moved to Super Region 2.

== Conference standings ==
=== Super Region 1 ===
2017 Great Midwest Athletic Conference football standings
	Conf.			Overall
Team	W		L	W		L
Ohio Dominican $	7	–	0	7	–	3
No. 22 Findlay ^	6	–	1	10	–	3
Hillsdale	5	–	2	7	–	4
Walsh	4	–	3	4	–	7
Alderson Broaddus	2	–	5	3	–	8
Lake Erie	2	–	5	2	–	8
Kentucky Wesleyan	1	–	6	2	–	8
Malone	1	–	6	1	–	9
$ – Conference champion; ^ – NCAA Division II playoff participant; Rankings from AFCA poll

2017 Mountain East Conference football standings
	Conf.			Overall
Team	W		L	W		L
No. 14 Shepherd $^	10	–	0	10	–	1
Notre Dame (OH)	8	–	2	8	–	3
Fairmont State	8	–	2	8	–	3
West Virginia State	5	–	5	6	–	5
West Virginia Wesleyan	5	–	5	5	–	6
Virginia–Wise	4	–	6	5	–	6
Urbana	4	–	6	5	–	6
Charleston (WV)	4	–	6	4	–	6
Glenville State	3	–	7	4	–	7
West Liberty	3	–	7	3	–	8
Concord	1	–	9	2	–	9
$ – Conference champion; ^ – NCAA Division II playoff participant; Rankings from AFCA poll

2017 Northeast-10 Conference football standings
	Conf.			Overall
Team	W		L	W		L
No. 9 Assumption $^	8	–	1	11	–	2
LIU Post	7	–	2	8	–	2
Bentley	6	–	3	6	–	4
New Haven	5	–	4	6	–	4
Stonehill	5	–	4	6	–	4
Southern Connecticut	5	–	4	5	–	5
Merrimack	4	–	5	4	–	6
Pace	2	–	7	3	–	7
American International	2	–	7	2	–	8
Saint Anselm	1	–	8	1	–	9
$ – Conference champion; ^ – NCAA Division II playoff participant; Rankings from AFCA poll

2017 Pennsylvania State Athletic Conference football standings
	Conf.			Overall
Team	W		L	W		L
East
No. 25 Shippensburg x^	6	–	1	10	–	2
West Chester xy^	6	–	1	9	–	4
Kutztown	5	–	2	8	–	3
Bloomsburg	4	–	3	7	–	4
Millersville	3	–	4	4	–	7
East Stroudsburg	2	–	5	3	–	8
Lock Haven	2	–	5	2	–	9
Cheyney	0	–	7	1	–	10
West
No. 3 IUP xy$^	7	–	0	13	–	1
California (PA) ^	5	–	2	9	–	3
Slippery Rock	5	–	2	8	–	3
Edinboro	4	–	3	7	–	4
Gannon	3	–	4	5	–	6
Mercyhurst	3	–	4	5	–	6
Clarion	1	–	6	1	–	10
Seton Hill	0	–	7	0	–	11
Championship: IUP 24, West Chester 7
$ – Conference champion; x – Division champion/co-champions; y – Championship game participant; ^ – NCAA Division II playoff participant; Rankings from AFCA poll

=== Super Region 2 ===
2017 Central Intercollegiate Athletic Association football standings
	Conf.			Overall
Team	W		L	W		L
Northern
No. 18 Virginia State xy$^	7	–	0	10	–	1
No. 23 Bowie State ^	6	–	1	9	–	2
Virginia Union	5	–	2	6	–	4
Chowan	4	–	3	4	–	6
Elizabeth City State	2	–	5	4	–	6
Lincoln (PA)	0	–	7	0	–	10
Southern
Fayetteville State xy	5	–	2	6	–	5
St. Augustine's x	5	–	2	5	–	5
Winston-Salem State	4	–	3	6	–	4
Shaw	2	–	5	3	–	7
Johnson C. Smith	2	–	5	2	–	8
Livingstone	0	–	7	0	–	10
Championship: Virginia St. 42, Fayetteville St. 19
$ – Conference champion; x – Division champion/co-champions; y – Championship game participant; ^ – NCAA Division II playoff participant; Rankings from AFCA Poll

2017 Gulf South Conference football standings
	Conf.			Overall
Team	W		L	W		L
No. 12 West Alabama $^	7	–	1	10	–	3
No. 2 West Florida ^	5	–	3	11	–	4
No. 21 Delta State ^	5	–	3	9	–	4
No. 19 West Georgia ^	5	–	3	9	–	4
Valdosta State	5	–	3	5	–	4
North Alabama	5	–	3	5	–	5
Florida Tech	3	–	5	5	–	6
Mississippi College	1	–	7	1	–	9
Shorter	0	–	8	0	–	11
$ – Conference champion; ^ – NCAA Division II playoff participant; Rankings from AFCA Poll

2017 South Atlantic Conference football standings
	Conf.			Overall
Team	W		L	W		L
No. 24 Wingate $^	6	–	1	9	–	2
Catawba	5	–	2	9	–	2
Carson–Newman	5	–	2	8	–	3
Tusculum	3	–	4	5	–	5
Newberry	3	–	4	5	–	6
Limestone	3	–	4	4	–	6
Lenoir–Rhyne	2	–	5	3	–	7
Mars Hill	1	–	6	3	–	7
$ – Conference champion; ^ – NCAA Division II playoff participant; Rankings from AFCA Poll

2017 Southern Intercollegiate Athletic Conference football standings
	Conf.			Overall
Team	W		L	W		L
East
Benedict x	5	–	1	7	–	2
Fort Valley State xy	5	–	1	5	–	5
Albany State	4	–	2	6	–	4
Morehouse	2	–	4	4	–	6
Clark Atlanta	2	–	4	4	–	6
West
Tuskegee xy$	6	–	0	9	–	2
Miles	4	–	2	6	–	4
Kentucky State	2	–	4	3	–	8
Lane	1	–	5	2	–	8
Central State (OH)	0	–	6	1	–	9
Championship: Tuskegee 13, Fort Valley State 6
$ – Conference champion; x – Division champion/co-champions; y – Championship game participant; Rankings from AFCA Poll

2017 NCAA Division II independents football records
	Conf.			Overall
Team	W		L	W		L
North Greenville		–		4	–	6
UNC Pembroke		–		2	–	8

=== Super Region 3 ===
2017 Great American Conference football standings
	Conf.			Overall
Team	W		L	W		L
Ouachita Baptist $^	9	–	2	9	–	3
No. 6 Harding ^	8	–	3	11	–	4
Arkansas Tech #	8	–	3	8	–	4
Southern Arkansas	7	–	4	7	–	4
SE Oklahoma State	7	–	4	7	–	4
Henderson State	6	–	5	6	–	5
Arkansas–Monticello	5	–	6	5	–	6
NW Oklahoma State	5	–	6	5	–	6
Southern Nazarene	4	–	7	4	–	7
SW Oklahoma State	3	–	8	3	–	8
East Central	2	–	9	2	–	9
Oklahoma Baptist	2	–	9	2	–	9
$ – Conference champion; ^ – NCAA Division II playoff participant; # – Live United Texarkana Bowl participant; Rankings from AFCA poll

2017 Great Lakes Intercollegiate Athletic Conference football standings
	Conf.			Overall
Team	W		L	W		L
No. 10 Ashland $^	9	–	0	11	–	2
No. 5 Ferris State ^	8	–	1	11	–	2
Grand Valley State	7	–	2	8	–	3
Tiffin	5	–	4	6	–	5
Northwood	5	–	4	7	–	4
Wayne State (MI)	4	–	5	5	–	6
Michigan Tech	3	–	6	4	–	7
Saginaw Valley State	3	–	6	5	–	6
Northern Michigan	1	–	8	1	–	9
Davenport *	0	–	9	1	–	10
$ – Conference champion; ^ – NCAA Division II playoff participant; * – Provisional Division II member; Rankings from AFCA poll

2017 Great Lakes Valley Conference football standings
	Conf.			Overall
Team	W		L	W		L
No. 13 Indianapolis $^	7	–	0	11	–	1
McKendree	5	–	2	7	–	4
Missouri S&T	5	–	2	7	–	4
Southwest Baptist	4	–	3	5	–	5
Truman State	4	–	3	5	–	6
William Jewell	2	–	5	2	–	9
Quincy	1	–	6	3	–	8
Lincoln (MO)	0	–	7	1	–	9
$ – Conference champion; ^ – NCAA Division II playoff participant; Rankings from AFCA Poll

2017 Mid-America Intercollegiate Athletics Association football standings
	Conf.			Overall
Team	W		L	W		L
No. 8 Fort Hays State $^	11	–	0	11	–	1
No. 16 NW Missouri State ^	9	–	2	9	–	3
Central Missouri #	8	–	3	9	–	3
Central Oklahoma #	7	–	4	8	–	4
Pittsburg State #	7	–	4	8	–	4
Washburn #	6	–	5	7	–	5
Emporia State	6	–	5	6	–	5
Lindenwood	4	–	7	4	–	7
Missouri Western	4	–	7	4	–	7
Nebraska–Kearney	3	–	8	3	–	8
Northeastern State	1	–	10	1	–	10
Missouri Southern	0	–	11	0	–	11
$ – Conference champion; ^ – NCAA Division II playoff participant; # – bowl participant (Central Missouri: Mineral Water Bowl, Central Oklahoma: Heritage Bowl, Pittsburg State: Live United Texarkana Bowl, Washburn: C.H.A.M.P.S. Heart of Texas Bowl); Rankings from AFCA Poll

=== Super Region 4 ===
2017 Great Northwest Athletic Conference football standings
	Conf.			Overall
Team	W		L	W		L
No. 7 Central Washington $^	8	–	0	11	–	1
Humboldt State	6	–	2	8	–	2
Azusa Pacific	4	–	4	7	–	4
Western Oregon	2	–	6	3	–	8
Simon Fraser	0	–	8	0	–	10
$ – Conference champion; ^ – NCAA Division II playoff participant; Rankings from AFCA Poll

2017 Lone Star Conference football standings
	Conf.			Overall
Team	W		L	W		L
No. 11 Midwestern State $^	8	–	0	10	–	1
No. 1 Texas A&M–Commerce ^	7	–	1	14	–	1
Eastern New Mexico	6	–	2	8	–	2
Tarleton State #	4	–	4	6	–	6
Angelo State #	4	–	4	6	–	5
Western New Mexico	3	–	5	4	–	7
Texas A&M–Kingsville	2	–	6	4	–	7
West Texas A&M	1	–	7	3	–	8
UT Permian Basin	1	–	7	2	–	9
$ – Conference champion; ^ – NCAA Division II playoff participant; # – bowl participant (Tarleton State - Heritage Bowl, Angelo State - C.H.A.M.P.S. Heart of Texas Bowl); Rankings from AFCA poll

2017 Northern Sun Intercollegiate Conference football standings
	Conf.			Overall
Team	W		L	W		L
North
Minnesota–Duluth #	9	–	2	9	–	3
Bemidji State	8	–	3	8	–	3
Northern State	6	–	5	6	–	5
St. Cloud State	6	–	5	6	–	5
MSU Moorhead	5	–	6	5	–	6
Minot State	3	–	8	3	–	8
Mary	1	–	10	1	–	10
Minnesota–Crookston	0	–	11	0	–	11
South
No. 4 Minnesota State $^	11	–	0	13	–	1
No. 15 Winona State ^	10	–	1	10	–	2
No. 20 Sioux Falls ^	9	–	2	9	–	3
Upper Iowa	6	–	5	6	–	5
Wayne State (NE)	6	–	5	6	–	5
Augustana (SD)	4	–	7	4	–	7
Concordia–St. Paul	2	–	9	2	–	9
SW Minnesota State	2	–	9	2	–	9
$ – Conference champion; ^ – NCAA Division II playoff participant; # – Mineral Water Bowl participant; Rankings from AFCA Poll

2017 Rocky Mountain Athletic Conference football standings
	Conf.			Overall
Team	W		L	W		L
Colorado Mesa +	9	–	1	9	–	2
No. 17 CSU Pueblo +^	9	–	1	9	–	3
Colorado Mines	7	–	3	7	–	4
Chadron State	6	–	4	6	–	5
Dixie State	5	–	5	5	–	6
Fort Lewis	5	–	5	5	–	6
South Dakota Mines	4	–	6	5	–	6
Black Hills State	4	–	6	4	–	6
Adams State	4	–	6	4	–	7
New Mexico Highlands	1	–	9	2	–	9
Western Colorado	1	–	9	1	–	10
+ – Conference co-champions; ^ – NCAA Division II playoff participant; Rankings from AFCA Poll

== Postseason ==
2017 NCAA Division II Football Championship
- Teams: 28
- Finals Site: Children's Mercy Park; Kansas City, Kansas
- Champion: Texas A&M–Commerce; (1st title, 1st title game)
- Runner-up: West Florida; (1st title game)
- Semifinalists: IUP; Harding
- Winning coach: Colby Carthel; 1st championship

The 2017 NCAA Division II Football Championship was the 45th edition of the Division II playoffs. The playoffs began on November 18 and concluded with the championship game on December 16.

The field consisted of 28 teams, seven from each of the four super regions. The participants in each region were determined by the regional rankings; if a conference's highest-ranked team was ranked in the top eight, that team qualified via the "earned access" provision, and all other participants were selected directly from the rankings. The top seed in each region received a first-round bye. After the quarterfinals, the regional winners were reseeded one through four, with No. 1 meeting No. 4 in the semifinals and No. 2 meeting No. 3.

=== Bracket ===
First round November 18	Second round November 25
1	IUP*	44
5	West Chester	10
4	Shippensburg*	6
5	West Chester	27
Super Region 1
2	Shepherd*	17
7	Findlay	29
7	Findlay	26
3	Assumption*	45
3	Assumption*	40
6	California (PA)	31
1	West Alabama*	27
5	Delta State	20
4	Bowie State*	35
5	Delta State	45
Super Region 2
2	Virginia State*	9
7	West Georgia	35
7	West Georgia*	14
6	West Florida	17
3	Wingate*	0
6	West Florida	31
1	Fort Hays State*	21
4	Ferris State	31
4	Ferris State*	24
5	Ouachita Baptist	19
Super Region 3
2	Indianapolis*	24
7	Harding	27
7	Harding	34
3	Ashland*	24
3	Ashland*	21
6	NW Missouri State	18
1	Central Washington*	31
5	Texas A&M–Commerce	34^{†}
4	Winona State*	6
5	Texas A&M–Commerce	20
Super Region 4
2	Minnesota State*	16^{†}
7	CSU Pueblo	13
2	Minnesota State*	63
3	Midwestern State	21
3	Midwestern State*	24
6	Sioux Falls	20

Quarterfinals; December 2
1	IUP	27
3	Assumption	22
1	West Alabama*	21
6	West Florida	28
4	Ferris State	14
7	Harding	16
5	Texas A&M–Commerce	31
2	Minnesota State*	21

Semifinals; December 9
1	IUP*	17
4	West Florida	27
3	Harding	17
2	Texas A&M–Commerce*	31

Championship; Kansas City, KS; December 16
4	West Florida	27
2	Texas A&M–Commerce	37

=== Bowl games ===
Date	Game	Site	Teams	Affiliations	Results
Dec 2	Corsicana Bowl	Tiger Stadium; Corsicana, Texas	Central Oklahoma Bronchos (7–4); Tarleton State Texans (6–5)	MIAA; Lone Star	Central Oklahoma 38; Tarleton State 31
Dec 2	C.H.A.M.P.S. Heart of Texas Bowl	Bulldawg Stadium; Copperas Cove, Texas	Washburn Ichabods (6–5); Angelo State Rams (6–5)	MIAA; Lone Star	Washburn 41; Angelo State 25
Dec 2	Live United Texarkana Bowl	Razorback Stadium; Texarkana, Arkansas	Pittsburg State Gorillas (7–4); Arkansas Tech Wonder Boys (8–3)	MIAA; GAC	Pittsburg State 41; Arkansas Tech 31
Dec 2	Mineral Water Bowl	Tiger Stadium; Excelsior Springs, Missouri	Central Missouri Mules (8–3); Minnesota–Duluth Bulldogs (9–2)	MIAA; NSIC	Central Missouri 38; Minnesota–Duluth 28

== See also ==
- 2017 NCAA Division II football rankings
- 2017 NCAA Division I FBS football season
- 2017 NCAA Division I FCS football season
- 2017 NCAA Division III football season
- 2017 NAIA football season
