= 2017 Edinboro Fighting Scots football team =

College football season

2017 Edinboro Fighting Scots football
- Conference: Pennsylvania State Athletic Conference|PSAC
- West Division
- Record: 7–4 (4–3 PSAC)
- Head coach: Justin Lustig (2nd season)
- Home stadium: Sox Harrison Stadium

2017 Pennsylvania State Athletic Conference football standings
	Conf.			Overall
Team	W		L	W		L
East
No. 25 Shippensburg x^	6	–	1	10	–	2
West Chester xy^	6	–	1	9	–	4
Kutztown	5	–	2	8	–	3
Bloomsburg	4	–	3	7	–	4
Millersville	3	–	4	4	–	7
East Stroudsburg	2	–	5	3	–	8
Lock Haven	2	–	5	2	–	9
Cheyney	0	–	7	1	–	10
West
No. 3 IUP xy$^	7	–	0	13	–	1
California (PA) ^	5	–	2	9	–	3
Slippery Rock	5	–	2	8	–	3
Edinboro	4	–	3	7	–	4
Gannon	3	–	4	5	–	6
Mercyhurst	3	–	4	5	–	6
Clarion	1	–	6	1	–	10
Seton Hill	0	–	7	0	–	11
Championship: IUP 24, West Chester 7
$ – Conference champion; x – Division champion/co-champions; y – Championship game participant; ^ – NCAA Division II playoff participant; Rankings from AFCA poll

The 2017 Edinboro Fighting Scots football team represented the Edinboro University of Pennsylvania in the 2017 NCAA Division II football season. They competed in the Pennsylvania State Athletic Conference (PSAC) West Division.

== Schedule ==
Date	Time	Opponent	Site	Result	Attendance
September 2	5:00 p.m.	Lake Erie*	Sox Harrison Stadium; Edinboro, PA	W 30–3	2,457
September 9	5:00 p.m.	Lock Haven	Sox Harrison Stadium; Edinboro, PA	W 20–3	2,111
September 16	12:00 p.m.	at West Chester	John A. Farrell Stadium; West Chester, PA	L 68–23	1,789
September 23	1:00 p.m.	at No. 6 IUP	Miller Stadium; Indiana, PA	L 7-38	2,126
September 30	12:00 p.m.	Clarion	Sox Harrison Stadium; Edinboro, PA	W 45-10	3,356
October 7	12:00 p.m.	at Gannon	Gannon University Stadium; Erie, PA	L 25-47	2,750
October 14	2:00 p.m.	Murcyhurst	Sox Harrison Stadium; Edinboro, PA	W 28-25	4,548
October 21	12:00 p.m.	No. 17 Slippery Rock	Sox Harrison Stadium; Edinboro, PA	W 49-39	3,221
October 28	3:00 p.m.	at Seton Hill	Offutt Field; Greensburg, PA	W 69-20	365
November 4	12:00 p.m.	California (PA)	Sox Harrison Stadium; Edinboro, PA	L 13-30	2,761
November 11	12:00 p.m.	at Cheyney	O'Shields Stevenson Stadium; Cheyney, PA	W 63-0	306
Rankings from D-II Coaches Rankings released prior to game Poll released prior to the game; All times are in Eastern time
