= 2017 Shippensburg Raiders football team =

American college football season

2017 Shippensburg Red Raiders football

PSAC East Division co-champion

NCAA Division II First Round, L 6–7 vs. West Chester
- Conference: Pennsylvania State Athletic Conference
- East Division
- Record: 10–2 (7–2 PSAC)
- Head coach: Mark Maciejewski (7th season)
- Home stadium: Seth Grove Stadium

2017 Pennsylvania State Athletic Conference football standings
	Conf.			Overall
Team	W		L	W		L
East
No. 25 Shippensburg x^	6	–	1	10	–	2
West Chester xy^	6	–	1	9	–	4
Kutztown	5	–	2	8	–	3
Bloomsburg	4	–	3	7	–	4
Millersville	3	–	4	4	–	7
East Stroudsburg	2	–	5	3	–	8
Lock Haven	2	–	5	2	–	9
Cheyney	0	–	7	1	–	10
West
No. 3 IUP xy$^	7	–	0	13	–	1
California (PA) ^	5	–	2	9	–	3
Slippery Rock	5	–	2	8	–	3
Edinboro	4	–	3	7	–	4
Gannon	3	–	4	5	–	6
Mercyhurst	3	–	4	5	–	6
Clarion	1	–	6	1	–	10
Seton Hill	0	–	7	0	–	11
Championship: IUP 24, West Chester 7
$ – Conference champion; x – Division champion/co-champions; y – Championship game participant; ^ – NCAA Division II playoff participant; Rankings from AFCA poll

The 2017 Shippensburg Raiders football team was an American football team that represented Shippensburg University in the Pennsylvania State Athletic Conference (PSAC) during the 2017 NCAA Division II football season.

== History ==
Led by seventh-year head coach Mark Maciejewski, the Raiders compiled a 10–1 record and tied for the East Division championship. Both of the team's losses were to West Chester, first in the regular season and later in the Division II playoffs. The team played its home games at Seth Grove Stadium in Shippensburg, Pennsylvania.

After the season, Maciejewski was named the 2017 AFCA Division II Region 1 Coach of the Year. Seven Shippensburg players were selected as first-team players on the All-PSAC East football team: quarterback Ryan Zapoticky; wide receiver Winston Eubanks; defensive linemen Richard Nase and Dakota Thompson; linebacker Tyler Emge; and defensive backs Richard Sheler and Kevin Taylor.

== Schedule ==
Date	Time	Opponent	Rank	Site	Result	Attendance	Source
September 2	1:00 p.m.	American International*		Seth Grove Stadium; Shippensburg, PA	W 41–7	1,200	
September 9	12:00 p.m.	at Gannon*		Gannon University Stadium; Erie, PA	W 44–33	1,299	
September 16	1:00 p.m.	at Clarion*		Memorial Stadium; Clarion, PA	W 31–0	1,949	
September 23	2:05 p.m.	at East Stroudsburg		Eiler-Martin Stadium; East Stroudsburg, PA	W 40–0	2,501	
September 30	1:00 p.m.	Lock Haven		Seth Grove Stadium; Shippensburg, PA	W 37–6	5,125	
October 7	1:00 p.m.	West Chester		Seth Grove Stadium; Shippensburg, PA	L 27–37	5,300	
October 14	1:00 p.m.	at Cheyney		O' Shields-Stevenson Stadium; Cheyney, PA	W 56–0	311	
October 21	1:00 p.m.	Millersville^{†}		Seth Grove Stadium; Shippensburg, PA	W 51–14	6,811	
October 28	4:05 p.m.	at Kutztown		Andre Reed Stadium; Kutztown, PA	W 27–13	6,672	
November 4	1:00 p.m.	Bloomsburg		Seth Grove Stadium; Shippensburg, PA	W 20–6	5,344	
November 11	1:00 p.m.	Seton Hill	No. 25	Seth Grove Stadium; Shippensburg, PA	W 51–13	3,005	
November 18		West Chester	No. 19	Seth Grove Stadium; Shippensburg, PA (NCAA Division II First Round)	L 6–7		
*Non-conference game; ^{†}Homecoming; Rankings from AFCA Poll released prior to the game; All times are in Eastern time
