= 2017 Bloomsburg Huskies football team =

American college football season

2017 Bloomsburg Huskies football
- Conference: Pennsylvania State Athletic Conference
- East Division
- Record: 7–4 (4–3 PSAC)
- Head coach: Paul Darragh (5th season)

2017 Pennsylvania State Athletic Conference football standings
	Conf.			Overall
Team	W		L	W		L
East
No. 25 Shippensburg x^	6	–	1	10	–	2
West Chester xy^	6	–	1	9	–	4
Kutztown	5	–	2	8	–	3
Bloomsburg	4	–	3	7	–	4
Millersville	3	–	4	4	–	7
East Stroudsburg	2	–	5	3	–	8
Lock Haven	2	–	5	2	–	9
Cheyney	0	–	7	1	–	10
West
No. 3 IUP xy$^	7	–	0	13	–	1
California (PA) ^	5	–	2	9	–	3
Slippery Rock	5	–	2	8	–	3
Edinboro	4	–	3	7	–	4
Gannon	3	–	4	5	–	6
Mercyhurst	3	–	4	5	–	6
Clarion	1	–	6	1	–	10
Seton Hill	0	–	7	0	–	11
Championship: IUP 24, West Chester 7
$ – Conference champion; x – Division champion/co-champions; y – Championship game participant; ^ – NCAA Division II playoff participant; Rankings from AFCA poll

The 2017 Bloomsburg Huskies football team represented Bloomsburg University in the PSAC East division.

== Recruits ==
=== Transfers ===
Name	Pos.	Ht.	Wt.	Hometown	Transferred from
Trae Young-White	CB	6–0	185	Pittsburgh, PA	Saint Francis

=== Incoming recruiting class ===
Name	Pos.	Ht. (ft-in)	Wt. (lbs)	Hometown	High School
Jeffrey Anderson	DB	5–11	195	Philadelphia, PA	Simon Gratz High School
Nick Argento	DT	6–2	300	York, PA	Red Lion High School
Ferrious Ashford	DB	6–0	190	Gettysburg, PA	Gettysburg High School
Gabe Bellinger	DE	6–0	220	Stroudsburg, PA	Stroudsburg High School
Qashah Carter	WR	5–6	155	Philadelphia, PA	Simon Gratz High School
Sal Cinaglia	OL	6–3	260	Upper Darby, PA	St. Joseph's Preparatory
Hakim Coles	LB	6–1	205	Philadelphia, PA	Northeast High School
Trevor Cunningham	WR	6–2	175	Orefield, PA	Northwestern Lehigh High School
Nick Emmett	WR	5–10	185	South Abington Township, PA	Abington Heights High School
James Felch	DT	6–5	235	New Tripoli, PA	Northwestern Lehigh High School
Tyler Horst	FB	6–0	215	Myerstown, PA	Eastern Lebanon County High School
Ross Stebbins	DE	5–10	225	Williamsport, PA	Williamsport Area High School
Aaron Trumino	LB	5–10	190	Binghamton, NY	Chenango Valley High School
Nahzir Wilson	DE	6–3	200	Philadelphia, PA	Northeast High School
Cam Young	DB	5–8	150	Elysburg, PA	Southern Columbia Area High School

== Schedule ==
Date	Time	Opponent	Site	Result	Attendance
September 2	12:00 p.m.	Stonehill*	Danny Hale Field at Redman Stadium; Bloomsburg, PA	L 44–28	1,367
September 9	1:00 p.m.	at Clarion*	Memorial Stadium; Clarion, PA	W 29–20	2,098
September 16	2:00 p.m.	Gannon*	Danny Hale Field at Redman Stadium; Bloomsburg, PA	W 27–10	4,189
September 23	2:00 p.m.	Cheyney	Danny Hale Field at Redman Stadium; Bloomsburg, PA	W 48–19	1,842
September 30	1:00 p.m.	at Millersville	Biemesderfer Stadium; Millersville, PA	W 28–21	1,250
October 7	2:00 p.m.	Kutztown^{†}	Danny Hale Field at Redman Stadium; Bloomsburg, PA	L 7–23	5,122
October 14	12:00 p.m.	at West Chester	John A. Farrell Stadium; West Chester, PA	W 20-19	3,694
October 21	4:00 p.m.	at East Stroudsburg	Eiler-Martin Stadium; East Stroudsburg, PA	W 38-28	1,500
October 28	2:00 p.m.	Lock Haven	Danny Hale Field at Redman Stadium; Bloomsburg, PA (Pink Out)	L 24-27	2,465
November 4	1:00 p.m.	at Shippensburg	Seth Grove Stadium; Shippensburg, PA	L 6-20	5,344
November 11	1:00 p.m.	Clarion	Danny Hale Field at Redman Stadium; Bloomsburg, PA (Senior Day)	W 31-15	1,412
*Non-conference game; ^{†}Homecoming; All times are in Eastern time
