= 2017 Millersville Marauders football team =

American college football season

2017 Millersville Marauders football
- Conference: PSAC
- East Division
- Record: 0–1 (0–0 PSAC)
- Head coach: Greg Breitbach (5th season)
- Home stadium: Biemesderfer Stadium

2017 Pennsylvania State Athletic Conference football standings
	Conf.			Overall
Team	W		L	W		L
East
No. 25 Shippensburg x^	6	–	1	10	–	2
West Chester xy^	6	–	1	9	–	4
Kutztown	5	–	2	8	–	3
Bloomsburg	4	–	3	7	–	4
Millersville	3	–	4	4	–	7
East Stroudsburg	2	–	5	3	–	8
Lock Haven	2	–	5	2	–	9
Cheyney	0	–	7	1	–	10
West
No. 3 IUP xy$^	7	–	0	13	–	1
California (PA) ^	5	–	2	9	–	3
Slippery Rock	5	–	2	8	–	3
Edinboro	4	–	3	7	–	4
Gannon	3	–	4	5	–	6
Mercyhurst	3	–	4	5	–	6
Clarion	1	–	6	1	–	10
Seton Hill	0	–	7	0	–	11
Championship: IUP 24, West Chester 7
$ – Conference champion; x – Division champion/co-champions; y – Championship game participant; ^ – NCAA Division II playoff participant; Rankings from AFCA poll

The 2017 Millersville Marauders football team represented Millersville University of Pennsylvania in Division II football.

== Background ==
=== Previous season ===
In 2016 the Marauders had a dismal 2–9 record and 1–6 in PSAC play. The 2016 season was the fourth year under head coach Greg Breitbach.

=== Departures ===
The following players graduated following the 2016 season:

Player	Year	Position	Reason left
Kendall Marks	Senior	Safety	Graduated
Evan Stahl	Senior	Punter	Graduated
J.J. Paige	Senior	Quarterback	Graduated
P.J. Santos	Senior	Safety	Graduated
Derek Yoder	Senior	Offensive line	Graduated

== Schedule ==
=== Regular season ===
Date	Time	Opponent	Site	TV	Result	Attendance
September 2	6:00 p.m.	at Pace*	Pace Stadium; New York City, NY		L 20–28	1,286
September 9	1:00 p.m.	at Seton Hill*	Offutt Field; Greensburg, PA		W 45–38	650
September 16	12:00 p.m.	No. 5 California (PA)*	Biemesderfer Stadium; Millersville, PA	PCTV	L 13–29	1,520
September 23	TBA	at Kutztown	Andre Reed Stadium; Kutztown, PA		L 21-41	5,531
September 30	1:00 p.m.	Bloomsburg	Biemesderfer Stadium; Millersville, PA		L 21-28	1,250
October 7	1:00 p.m.	at East Stroudsburg	Eiler-Martin Stadium; East Stroudsburg, PA		W 12-0	800
October 14	2:00 p.m.	Lock Haven	Biemesderfer Stadium; Millersville, PA		W 34-21	3,005
October 21	1:00 p.m.	at Shippensburg	Seth Grove Stadium; Shippensburg, PA		L 14-51	6,811
October 28	4:00 p.m.	Cheyney	Biemesderfer Stadium; Millersville, PA		W 59-7	1,100
November 4	1:00 p.m.	West Chester	Biemesderfer Stadium; Millersville, PA		L 24-27	2,100
October 14	2:00 p.m.	Gannon*	Biemesderfer Stadium; Millersville, PA		L 7-39	650
Rankings from D-II Coaches Rankingsreleased prior to game Poll released prior to the game; All times are in Eastern time

== Roster ==
2017 Millersville Marauders football team roster
Players
Coaches
Offense

Pos.	#	Name	Class
WR	1	Kevin Wiggins	Sr
QB	2	Tommy Klock	So
WR	3	Tyrone Gibson	Jr
WR	4	Steven Flanagan	So
QB	10	Collin Starks	So
WR	11	Nii Kotei Noki	Sr
WR	13	Marcel Mingo	Jr
WR	14	Blake CaHill	So
WR	16	Deyone Doctor	So

Defense

Pos.	#	Name	Class
LB	5	Rob Varner	Jr
CB	6	Jarrid Satterfield	Jr
LB	8	Brandon Lopez	Sr
LB	18	Jaleel Robinson	So
CB	19	Nate Hilight	Jr

Special teams

Pos.	#	Name	Class

Head coach

- Greg Breitbach

Coordinators/assistant coaches

- Matt Suhjac (Defensive coordinator/safeties)

Legend

- (C) Team captain
- (S) Suspended
- (I) Ineligible
- Injured
- Redshirt

Roster
