= 2017 Kutztown Golden Bears football team =

American college football season

2017 Kutztown Golden Bears football
- Conference: Pennsylvania State Athletic Conference|PSAC
- East Division
- Record: 8–3 (5–2 PSAC)
- Head coach: Jim Clements (4th season)
- Home stadium: Andre Reed Stadium

2017 Pennsylvania State Athletic Conference football standings
	Conf.			Overall
Team	W		L	W		L
East
No. 25 Shippensburg x^	6	–	1	10	–	2
West Chester xy^	6	–	1	9	–	4
Kutztown	5	–	2	8	–	3
Bloomsburg	4	–	3	7	–	4
Millersville	3	–	4	4	–	7
East Stroudsburg	2	–	5	3	–	8
Lock Haven	2	–	5	2	–	9
Cheyney	0	–	7	1	–	10
West
No. 3 IUP xy$^	7	–	0	13	–	1
California (PA) ^	5	–	2	9	–	3
Slippery Rock	5	–	2	8	–	3
Edinboro	4	–	3	7	–	4
Gannon	3	–	4	5	–	6
Mercyhurst	3	–	4	5	–	6
Clarion	1	–	6	1	–	10
Seton Hill	0	–	7	0	–	11
Championship: IUP 24, West Chester 7
$ – Conference champion; x – Division champion/co-champions; y – Championship game participant; ^ – NCAA Division II playoff participant; Rankings from AFCA poll

The 2017 Kutztown Golden Bears football team represented Kutztown University of Pennsylvania in Division II football as a member of the PSAC East Division.

== Schedule ==
Date	Time	Opponent	Site	TV	Result	Attendance
September 2	12:05 pm	Assumption*	Andre Reed Stadium; Kutztown, PA	KUTV	L 31–28	2,313
September 9	12:00 pm	at Mercyhurst*	Tullio Field; Erie, PA		W 21–16	1,113
September 16	12:05 pm	Seton Hill*	Andre Reed Stadium; Kutztown, PA	KUTV	W 62–17	2,084
September 23	6:05 pm	Millersville	Andre Reed Stadium; Kutztown, PA	KUTV	W 41–21	5,531
September 30	12:00 pm	at West Chester	John A. Farrell Stadium; West Chester, PA		L 21–27	5,674
October 7	2:30 pm	at Bloomsburg	Robert B. Redman Stadium; Bloomsburg, PA		W 23–7	5,122
October 14	1:05 pm	East Stroudsburg	Andre Reed Stadium; Kutztown, PA	KUTV	W 41-9	2,787
October 21	12:00 pm	at Lock Haven	Hubert Jack Stadium; Lock Haven, PA		W 55-26	1,328
October 28	4:05 pm	Shippensburg^{†}	Andre Reed Stadium; Kutztown, PA	KUTV	L 13-27	6,672
November 4	12:00 pm	at Cheyney	O'Shields-Stevenson Stadium; Cheyney, PA		W 65-0	247
November 11	12:05	Slippery Rock	Andre Reed Stadium; Kutztown, PA	KUTV	W 42-34	1,111
*Non-conference game; ^{†}Homecoming; All times are in Eastern time
