= 2017 PSAC Football Championship Game =

IUP Crimson Hawks	West Chester Golden Rams
(10–0)	(8–2)
24	7
Head coach: Paul Tortorella	Head coach: Bill Zwaan
	1	2	3	4	Total
IUP	14	7	0	3	24
West Chester	0	7	0	0	7
- Date: December 2, 2017
- Season: 2017
- Stadium: John A. Farrell Stadium
- Location: West Chester, Pennsylvania
- MVP: Lenny Williams, Quarterback IUP
- Favorite: IUP by 14
- Referee: Brandon Hoover
- Attendance: 6,979

United States TV coverage
- Network: ESPN2

2017 Pennsylvania State Athletic Conference football standings
	Conf.			Overall
Team	W		L	W		L
East
No. 25 Shippensburg x^	6	–	1	10	–	2
West Chester xy^	6	–	1	9	–	4
Kutztown	5	–	2	8	–	3
Bloomsburg	4	–	3	7	–	4
Millersville	3	–	4	4	–	7
East Stroudsburg	2	–	5	3	–	8
Lock Haven	2	–	5	2	–	9
Cheyney	0	–	7	1	–	10
West
No. 3 IUP xy$^	7	–	0	13	–	1
California (PA) ^	5	–	2	9	–	3
Slippery Rock	5	–	2	8	–	3
Edinboro	4	–	3	7	–	4
Gannon	3	–	4	5	–	6
Mercyhurst	3	–	4	5	–	6
Clarion	1	–	6	1	–	10
Seton Hill	0	–	7	0	–	11
Championship: IUP 24, West Chester 7
$ – Conference champion; x – Division champion/co-champions; y – Championship game participant; ^ – NCAA Division II playoff participant; Rankings from AFCA poll

The 2017 Pennsylvania State Athletic Conference Football Championship Game was held on December 2, 2017, at a John A. Farrell Stadium on the campus of West Chester University in West Chester, Pennsylvania. The Indiana Crimson Hawks repressed the West Division and West Chester Golden Rams the East Division. Play for the PSAC Championship offered an automatic bid into the NCAA Division II Football Championship.

== Teams ==
=== #4 Indiana (PA) ===
The Crimson Hawks entered the Championship with a 10–0 record and a 7–0 in conference. Entering the game IUP outscored opponent by an average of 27 points per game.

== Box score ==
Scoring summary

Quarter	Time	Drive			Team	Scoring information	Score	
Quarter	Time	Plays	Yards	TOP	Team	Scoring information	Indiana (PA)	West Chester
1	9:00	13	78	6:00	IUP	Dom McNeil 15-yard touchdown reception from Lenny Williams, Dillon Sarka kick good	7	0
1	3:47	5	69	2:07	IUP	Chris Wuestner 7-yard touchdown reception from Lenny Williams, Dillon Sarka kick good	14	0
2	14:19	8	78	4:28	WC	Dan Neuhaus 36-yard touchdown reception from Paul Dooley, Andrew Chegia kick good	14	7
2	6:40	9	85	4:17	IUP	Kolbe Hughes 40-yard touchdown reception from Lenny Williams, Dillon Sarka kick good	21	7
4	4:41	7	38	4:25	IUP	20-yard field goal by Dillon Sarka	24	7
"TOP" = time of possession. For other American football terms, see Glossary of American football.							24	7

=== Team statistics ===
IUP		WC
20	First downs	13
174	Net rushing	30

== Media ==
It was announced on March 17, 2017, that ESPN networks would be covering the game. Not until August 2017 was the specific channel announced, ESPN2 was announced as airing the game on August 11, 2017, but a time slot on ESPN3 was also held and announced. As of September 2017 no clarification on which channel will be airing the game. However ESPN will air it on either one of its sister channels.
