= 2017 California Vulcans football team =

American college football season

2017 California Vulcans football

NCAA First Round
- Conference: Pennsylvania State Athletic Conference
- West Division

Ranking
- AFCA: No. 24
- Record: 9–3 (5–2 PSAC)
- Head coach: Gary Dunn (2nd season)
- Offensive coordinator: Chad Salisbury (9th season)
- Home stadium: Hepner–Bailey Field at Adamson Stadium

2017 Pennsylvania State Athletic Conference football standings
	Conf.			Overall
Team	W		L	W		L
East
No. 25 Shippensburg x^	6	–	1	10	–	2
West Chester xy^	6	–	1	9	–	4
Kutztown	5	–	2	8	–	3
Bloomsburg	4	–	3	7	–	4
Millersville	3	–	4	4	–	7
East Stroudsburg	2	–	5	3	–	8
Lock Haven	2	–	5	2	–	9
Cheyney	0	–	7	1	–	10
West
No. 3 IUP xy$^	7	–	0	13	–	1
California (PA) ^	5	–	2	9	–	3
Slippery Rock	5	–	2	8	–	3
Edinboro	4	–	3	7	–	4
Gannon	3	–	4	5	–	6
Mercyhurst	3	–	4	5	–	6
Clarion	1	–	6	1	–	10
Seton Hill	0	–	7	0	–	11
Championship: IUP 24, West Chester 7
$ – Conference champion; x – Division champion/co-champions; y – Championship game participant; ^ – NCAA Division II playoff participant; Rankings from AFCA poll

The 2017 California Vulcans football team represented California University of Pennsylvania in the 2017 NCAA Division II football season. It was the second season for the team with head coach Gary Dunn.

== Schedule ==
Date	Time	Opponent	Rank	Site	TV	Result	Attendance
August 31	6:00 p.m.	Ohio Dominican*	No. 8	Hepner–Bailey Field at Adamson Stadium; California, PA		W 36–34	4,618
September 9	1:00 p.m.	Cheyney*	No. 5	Hepner–Bailey Field at Adamson Stadium; California, PA		W 54–14	2,818
September 16	12:00 p.m.	at Millersville*	No. 5	Biemesderfer Stadium; Millersville, PA		W 29–13	1,250
September 23	1:00 p.m.	Seton Hill	No. 5	Hepner–Bailey Field at Adamson Stadium; California, PA		W 44-41	2,230
September 30	6:00 p.m.	at No. 18 Slippery Rock	No. 5	N. Kerr Thompson Stadium; Slippery Rock, PA	ESPN3	L 47–44 ^{OT}	7,476
October 7	2:00 p.m.	at No. 4 IUP	No. 16	Miller Stadium; Indiana, PA (Rivalry)	ESPN3	L 26–10	4,019
October 14	3:00 p.m.	Clarion^{†}		Hepner–Bailey Field at Adamson Stadium; California, PA		W 21-19	3,311
October 21	12:00	at Gannon		Gannon University Stadium; Erie, PA		W 38-35	1,112
October 28	1:00 p.m.	Mercyhurst		Hepner–Bailey Field at Adamson Stadium; California, PA		W 31-21	724
November 4	12:00 p.m.	at Edinboro		Sox Harrison Stadium; Edinboro, PA		W 30-13	2,761
November 11	12:00 p.m.	at East Stroudsburg		Eiler-Martin Stadium; East Stroudsburg, PA		W 31-14	1,045
*Non-conference game; ^{†}Homecoming; Rankings from AFCA Coaches Poll released prior to the game

== Rankings ==
Ranking movements Legend: ██ Increase in ranking ██ Decrease in ranking RV = Received votes
	Week												
Poll	Pre	1	2	3	4	5	6	7	8	9	10	11	Final
AFCA Coaches	8	5	5	5	5	16	RV						
D2football	9	7	6	5	5	18	25						
