= 2017 IUP Crimson Hawks football team =

American college football season

2017 IUP Crimson Hawks football

PSAC champion PSAC East Division champion

PSAC Championship, W 27–7 vs West Chester

NCAA Division II Semifinal, L 17–27 vs. West Florida
- Conference: Pennsylvania State Athletic Conference
- West Division

Ranking
- AFCA: No. 3
- Record: 13–1 (7–0 PSAC)
- Head coach: Paul Tortorella (1st season)
- Home stadium: Miller Stadium

2017 Pennsylvania State Athletic Conference football standings
	Conf.			Overall
Team	W		L	W		L
East
No. 25 Shippensburg x^	6	–	1	10	–	2
West Chester xy^	6	–	1	9	–	4
Kutztown	5	–	2	8	–	3
Bloomsburg	4	–	3	7	–	4
Millersville	3	–	4	4	–	7
East Stroudsburg	2	–	5	3	–	8
Lock Haven	2	–	5	2	–	9
Cheyney	0	–	7	1	–	10
West
No. 3 IUP xy$^	7	–	0	13	–	1
California (PA) ^	5	–	2	9	–	3
Slippery Rock	5	–	2	8	–	3
Edinboro	4	–	3	7	–	4
Gannon	3	–	4	5	–	6
Mercyhurst	3	–	4	5	–	6
Clarion	1	–	6	1	–	10
Seton Hill	0	–	7	0	–	11
Championship: IUP 24, West Chester 7
$ – Conference champion; x – Division champion/co-champions; y – Championship game participant; ^ – NCAA Division II playoff participant; Rankings from AFCA poll

The 2017 IUP Crimson Hawks football team represented Indiana University of Pennsylvania in the 2017 NCAA Division II football season. It was the first season for the team with head coach Paul Tortorella.

== Background ==
=== Departures ===
Name	Position	Year	Reason left
Nick Dubowski	LB	Senior	Graduated
Ackeno Robertson	DB	Senior	Graduated
Andrew DeGol	DB	Senior	Graduated
Ryan Stewert	K	Senior	Graduated
Jordan Spangler	P	Senior	Graduated
Ethan Cooper	OL	Senior	Declared for 2017 NFL draft
Tony Morgante	OL	Senior	Graduated

== Schedule ==
Date	Time	Opponent	Rank	Site	TV	Result	Attendance
August 31	7:00 p.m.	Ashland*	No. 9	Miller Stadium; Indiana, PA		W 26–23	3,235
September 9	4:00 p.m.	East Stroudsburg*	No. 6	Miller Stadium; Indiana, PA		W 38–14	2,636
September 16	12:00 p.m.	Cheyney*	No. 6	Miller Stadium; Indiana, PA		W 65–16	1,694
September 23	12:00 p.m.	Edinboro	No. 6	Miller Stadium; Indiana, PA		W 38–7	2,126
September 30		at Seton Hill	No. 4	Offutt Field; Greensburg, PA		W 57–14	975
October 7	2:00 p.m.	No. 16 California	No. 4	Miller Field; Indiana, PA	ESPN3	W 26–10	4,019
October 14		at No. 9 Slippery Rock	No. 3	Mihalik-Thompson Stadium; Slippery Rock, PA	ESPN3	W 34–17	10,111
October 21		at Clarion	No. 3	Memorial Field; Clarion, PA		W 23–17	1,277
October 28	12:00 p.m.	Gannon	No. 4	Miller Stadium; Indiana, Pennsylvania		W 42–26	1,630
November 4		at Mercyhurst	No. 3	Tullio Field; Erie, PA		W 36–10	1,178
November 11		at West Chester*	No. 3	John A. Farrell Stadium; West Chester, PA		W 24–7	5,234
*Non-conference game; Rankings from AFCA Poll released prior to the game; All times are in Eastern time

== Rankings ==
Ranking movements Legend: ██ Increase in ranking ██ Decrease in ranking
	Week											
Poll	Pre	1	2	3	4	5	6	7	8	9	10	Final
AFCA Coaches	12	9	6	6	4	3						
D2football	11	10	8	6	4	3						

== Roster ==
2017 IUP Crimson Hawks football team roster
Players
Coaches
Offense

Pos.	#	Name	Class
QB	1	Andre Dreuitt-Parks	So
WR	4	Allen White	Sr
QB	5	Lennie Williams Jr.	Jr
WR	8	JoJo Gause	So
RB	9	Malik Andersen	So
WR	11	Swaneek Brown	Jr
QB	14	Mike DeBaugh	Sr
WR	15	Devin Altland	Sr
WR	16	Caleb Horton	Sr
QB	18	Jake Celinolo	Fr
WR	19	Miles Williamson	Jr
RB	23	Luigi Lista-Brinza	Sr
RB	26	Samir Bullock	So
RB	27	Chris Temple	Sr
TE	40	Rex Pierce	Sr
WR	45	Ryan Waltz	Sr
TE	49	Ryan Otto	So
G	54	Colin McCalister	So
G	57	Mike Brown	So
C	58	Dan Charmo	Sr
G	60	Kidus Woldeyes	Sr
C	62	Devon Barnes	Jr
OT	63	Joe Paterson	So
OT	64	Jeff Arnold	Sr
T/G	65	Shaqiun Cooley	Fr
G	68	Justin Weldon	Sr
OT	70	Luke Milcic	Jr
OT	73	Zaire Willis	So
OT	74	Gabrielle Diaz	Sr

Defense

Pos.	#	Name	Class
DB	1	Mcle Makle	Jr
DB	2	Jay Watkins	Sr
DB	3	John McDonald-Horer	So
CB	10	Andrew Robinson	Fr
CB	13	Mike Pietropola	Jr
DB	17	Isaiah Stokes	So
DB	21	Eric Doe	Sr
CB	22	J.R. Stevens	Jr
DB	23	Maurice Jones Jr.	Jr
DB	39	Morgan Jackson	Fr
LB	44	Branden Meyers	Fr
LB	45	Diondre Faulk	Fr
DB	50	Damon Floyd
DE/DT	51	Qwamere Wright-Downing	So
LB	52	Zack Weaver	So
DT	55	Damian Jones	Jr
DT	68	Justin Weldon	Sr
DE	81	Malik Allen	Fr
DT/DE	90	Dylan Scott	Jr
DE	91	DeAndre Easterling	Jr
DT	92	Jemal Averette	Sr
DB	93	Jordan Devin	Fr
DL	99	Dondrea Tillman	So

Special teams

Pos.	#	Name	Class
K	37	Dylan Sarka	So
K	87	Sean Bowling	Jr
LS	88	Noah Bertram	Jr

Head coach

- Paul Tortorella

Coordinators/assistant coaches

- Jim Smith (Defensive Coordinator/Linebackers)
- Tate Gregory (Offensive Coordinator/Quarterbacks)
- Mike Campolo (Offensive Line)
- Luke Barker (Running Backs)
- Christian Bryant (Wide Receivers)

Legend

- (C) Team captain
- (S) Suspended
- (I) Ineligible
- Injured
- Redshirt

Roster
