= 2017 Pennsylvania State Athletic Conference football season =

- League: NCAA Division II Football
- Sport: Football
- TV partner(s): ESPN3, ESPNNews including multiple local broadcasting partners

Regular season
- Champions: IUP
- East Division champions: Shippensburg
- West Division champions: IUP

Seasons
- 2018 →

2017 Pennsylvania State Athletic Conference football standings
	Conf.			Overall
Team	W		L	W		L
East
No. 25 Shippensburg x^	6	–	1	10	–	2
West Chester xy^	6	–	1	9	–	4
Kutztown	5	–	2	8	–	3
Bloomsburg	4	–	3	7	–	4
Millersville	3	–	4	4	–	7
East Stroudsburg	2	–	5	3	–	8
Lock Haven	2	–	5	2	–	9
Cheyney	0	–	7	1	–	10
West
No. 3 IUP xy$^	7	–	0	13	–	1
California (PA) ^	5	–	2	9	–	3
Slippery Rock	5	–	2	8	–	3
Edinboro	4	–	3	7	–	4
Gannon	3	–	4	5	–	6
Mercyhurst	3	–	4	5	–	6
Clarion	1	–	6	1	–	10
Seton Hill	0	–	7	0	–	11
Championship: IUP 24, West Chester 7
$ – Conference champion; x – Division champion/co-champions; y – Championship game participant; ^ – NCAA Division II playoff participant; Rankings from AFCA poll

The 2017 Pennsylvania State Athletic Conference football season football season was the 53rd year of college football in the Pennsylvania State Athletic Conference (PSAC). The PSAC consists of 16 teams located throughout Pennsylvania.

== Rankings ==
		Pre	Wk 1	Wk 2	Wk 3	Wk 4	Wk 5	Wk 6	Wk 7	Wk 8	Wk 9	Wk 10	Wk 11	Final
Bloomsburg	AFCA Coaches	NR	NR	NR	NR	NR	RV	NR	NR	NR	NR	NR	NR	NR
Bloomsburg	Regional	NR	NR	NR	NR	NR	RV	RV	NR	NR	NR	NR	NR	NR
Cheyney	AFCA Coaches	RV	NR	NR	NR	NR	NR	NR	NR	NR	NR	NR	NR	NR
Cheyney	Regional	RV	NR	NR	NR	NR	NR	NR	NR	NR	NR	NR	NR	NR
East Stroudsburg	AFCA Coaches	NR	NR	NR	NR	NR	NR	NR	NR	NR	NR	NR	NR	NR
East Stroudsburg	Regional	NR	NR	NR	NR	NR	NR	NR	NR	NR	NR	NR	NR	NR
Kutztown	AFCA Coaches	NR	NR	NR	NR									
Kutztown	Regional	NR	NR	NR	NR									
Lock Haven	AFCA Coaches	NR	NR	NR	NR	NR	NR	NR	NR	NR	NR	NR	NR	NR
Lock Haven	Regional	NR	NR	NR	NR	NR	NR	NR	NR	NR	NR	NR	NR	NR
Millersville	AFCA Coaches	NR	NR	NR	NR									
Millersville	Regional	NR	NR	NR	NR									
Shippensburg	AFCA Coaches	NR	NR	RV	RV									
Shippensburg	Regional	NR	NR	RV	RV									
West Chester	AFCA Coaches	NR	NR	NR	NR									
West Chester	Regional	NR	NR	NR	NR									
California (PA)	AFCA Coaches	8	5	5	5									
California (PA)	Regional	11	7	5	5									
Clarion	AFCA Coaches	NR	NR	NR	NR									
Clarion	Regional	RV	NR	NR	NR									
Edinboro	AFCA Coaches	NR	NR	NR	NR									
Edinboro	Regional	RV	NR	NR	NR									
Gannon	AFCA Coaches	NR	NR	NR	NR									
Gannon	Regional	NR	NR	NR	NR									
Indiana (PA)	AFCA Coaches	12	9	6	5									
Indiana (PA)	Regional	11	8	6	5									
Mercyhurst	AFCA Coaches	NR	NR	NR	NR	NR								NR
Mercyhurst	Regional	NR	NR	NR	NR	NR								NR
Seton Hill	AFCA Coaches	NR	NR	NR	NR	NR	NR	NR	NR	NR	NR	NR	NR	NR
Seton Hill	Regional	NR	NR	NR	NR	NR	NR	NR	NR	NR	NR	NR	NR	NR
Slippery Rock	AFCA Coaches	RV	24	21	18									
Slippery Rock	Regional	RV	25	22	19									

Legend
NR	Not ranked; not receiving votes
RV	Receiving votes
		Improvement in ranking
		Drop in ranking
		Not ranked previous week
		No change in ranking from previous week
		**All Rankings from AFCA Coaches and Regional Rankings polls**

== Standings ==
=== East Division ===
PSAC East Division
Team	Conf.			Overall			PF	PA
Team	W	L	Pct.	W	L	Pct.	PF	PA
No. 25 Shippensburg	6	1	.857	10	1	.909	422	129
West Chester	6	1	.857	8	3	.727	393	248
Kutztown	5	2	.714	8	3	.727	412	215
Bloomsburg	4	3	.571	7	4	.636	286	246
Millersville	3	4	.429	4	7	.364	270	309
East Stroudsburg	2	5	.286	3	8	.273	201	309
Lock Haven	2	5	.286	2	9	.182	206	367
Cheyney	0	7	.000	1	10	.091	131	588

=== West Division ===
PSAC West Division
Team	Conf.			Overall			PF	PA
Team	W	L	Pct.	W	L	Pct.	PF	PA
No. 3 IUP	7	0	1.000	11	0	1.000	409	161
California (PA)	5	2	.714	9	2	.818	368	277
Slippery Rock	5	2	.714	8	3	.727	442	359
Edinboro	4	3	.571	7	4	.636	377	277
Gannon	3	4	.429	5	6	.455	426	334
Mercyhurst	3	4	.429	5	6	.455	239	252
Clarion	1	6	.143	1	10	.091	169	327
Seton Hill	0	7	.000	0	11	.000	263	597

== NFL draft ==
Round	Pick	Player	Selected by	School	Playing position
5	147	Jordan Morgan	Chicago Bears	Kutztown	Offensive guard
