= Mark Maciejewski =

American football coach (born c. 1970)

Biographical details
- Born: c. 1970 (age 55–56); Punxsutawney, Pennsylvania, U.S.
- Education: Shippensburg University of Pennsylvania (1992, 1996)

Playing career
- 1989–1992: Shippensburg
- Position: Nose guard

Coaching career (HC unless noted)
- 1995–1996: Shippensburg (GA)
- 1997: James Madison (ST/DE)
- 1998: James Madison (DB)
- 1999: Saint Francis (PA) (DC)
- 2000–2002: Shippensburg (DB)
- 2003–2005: Shippensburg (DC/DB)
- 2006–2010: Shippensburg (AHC/DB)
- 2011–2025: Shippensburg

Head coaching record
- Overall: 87–69
- Tournaments: 1–2 (NCAA D-II playoffs)

Accomplishments and honors

Championships
- 3 PSAC East Division (2012–2013, 2017)

Awards
- 2× Third-team AP All-America (1991–1992); 3× First-team All-PSAC (1990–1992); AFCA Division II Region 1 Coach of the Year (2017)

Mark "Mac" Maciejewski (born c. 1970) is an American former college football coach. He was the head football coach for Shippensburg University of Pennsylvania, a position he held from 2011 until his retirement in 2025. He also coached for James Madison and Saint Francis. He played college football for Shippensburg as a nose guard.

== Head coaching record ==
Year	Team	Overall	Conference	Standing	Bowl/playoffs	AFCA^{#}
Shippensburg Raiders (Pennsylvania State Athletic Conference) (2011–2025)
2011	Shippensburg	7–4	4–3	T–4th (East)		
2012	Shippensburg	11–2	7–0	1st (East)	L NCAA Division II Second Round	14
2013	Shippensburg	7–4	6–1	T–1st (East)		
2014	Shippensburg	6–5	5–4	T–3rd (East)		
2015	Shippensburg	8–3	5–2	T–2nd (East)		
2016	Shippensburg	7–4	4–3	T–3rd (East)		
2017	Shippensburg	10–2	6–1	T–1st (East)	L NCAA Division II First Round	25
2018	Shippensburg	6–5	3–3	4th (East)		
2019	Shippensburg	4–7	4–3	4th (East)		
2020–21	No team—COVID-19					
2021	Shippensburg	9–2	5–2	3rd (East)		
2022	Shippensburg	5–6	3–4	T–5th (East)		
2023	Shippensburg	2–8	2–5	T–6th (East)		
2024	Shippensburg	2–9	1–6	7th (East)		
2025	Shippensburg	3–8	3–4	5th (East)		
Shippensburg:		87–69	58–41			
Total:		87–69				
National championship Conference title Conference division title or championship game berth
