= Hubertina D. Hogan =

American scientist

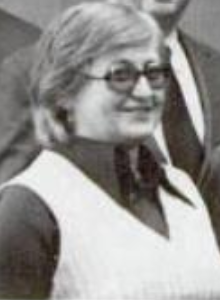
- Hubertina Hogan, from a 1976 publication of the United States Army
- Born: Hubertina Dorothy Clayton; December 25, 1924; Trenton, New Jersey, U.S.
- Died: April 14, 2017 (aged 92); Cumming, Georgia, U.S.
- Other names: Tina Clayton
- Occupation: Chemist

Hubertina Dorothy Clayton Hogan (December 25, 1924 – April 14, 2017) was an American textile chemist, employed for most of her career in the United States Army's Combat Capabilities Development Command laboratories in Natick, Massachusetts.

== Early life and education ==
Hubertina "Tina" Clayton was from Trenton, New Jersey, the daughter of Joseph Aloysius Clayton and Elsie Papendick Clayton (later Dietrich). Her father was a World War I veteran. She was named for her paternal grandmother, Hubertina Brandt Clayton, who lived with her family. She graduated from Trenton Cathedral High School in Trenton in 1943, and from Seton Hill University in 1947. She pursued further studies in biochemistry at the University of Pennsylvania in Philadelphia, and in textile chemistry at Lowell Technological Institute. Her master's thesis was titled "The relationship between hydrogen ion concentration and a water-oil repellent fluorochemical finish" (1973).

== Career ==
From 1952 into the 1970s, Hogan was a research chemist at the Army's Clothing, Equipment, and Materials Engineering Laboratory in Natick, Massachusetts. Her research involved textiles and their properties of repelling or absorbing environmental hazards in combat settings. She "developed the analytical method for determining chrome content of feathers and down." She was a member of the American Leather Chemists Association beginning in 1955.

== Publications ==
Professional publications by Hogan included articles in Textile Research Journal, Journal of the American Leather Chemists Association, and Analytical Chemistry.

- "A Rapid Sole Leather Tannage with Aldehydes" (1958, with Ludwig Seligsberger and C.W. Mann)
- "The Actions of Acrylonitrile and Acrylamide upon Collagen" (1958, with L. Seligsberger)
- "Observations on the Tanning Action of Synthetic Polyphenols" (1963, with L. Seligsberger)
- "Determination of bis (2-chloroethyl) sulfide in a Dawson apparatus by gas chromatography" (1972, with R. L. Erickson, R. N. MacNair and R. H. Brown)
- Feasibility Study to Determine the Fluorine Content in Quarpel-treated Fabrics by Analysis with a 14 MeV Neutron Activation Source (1972, with Forest C. Burns and Gil M. Dias)
- "Sorptive Textile Systems Containing Activated Carbon Fibers" (1974, with Gilbert N. Arons, Richard N. MacNair, and Laurance G. Coffin)

== Personal life ==
Clayton married John Daniel Hogan in 1967, in Massachusetts; her husband died in 1973. She lived with her mother in Jobstown, New Jersey in the 1980s. She died in Cumming, Georgia, in 2017, aged 92 years.
