= Bill Zwaan =

American football and basketball coach (born 1954)

Biographical details
- Born: November 9, 1954 (age 71)

Playing career

Football
- 1973–1975: Delaware
- Position: Quarterback

Coaching career (HC unless noted)

Football
- 1977–1979: Monsignor Bonner HS (PA) (OC)
- 1980: Cincinnati (assistant)
- 1981–1985: Merchant Marine (assistant)
- 1988: Martin County HS (FL) (assistant)
- 1989–1991: Martin County HS (FL)
- 1992–1996: Widener (DC)
- 1997–2002: Widener
- 2003–2023: West Chester

Baseball
- 1983–1984: Merchant Marine
- 1993–1996: Widener

Head coaching record
- Overall: 217–90 (college football); 67–101–1 (college baseball)
- Tournaments: Football; 10–10 (NCAA D-II playoffs); 5–2 (NCAA D-III playoffs)

Accomplishments and honors

Championships
- Football; 3 Middle Atlantic (2000–2002); 2 PSAC (2018); 4 PSAC East Division (2004, 2007-2008, 2013, 2015, 2017–2018)

Bill Zwaan Sr. (born November 9, 1954) in an American former college football and college baseball coach. He served as the head football coach at Widener University in Chester, Pennsylvania from 1997 to 2002 and West Chester University in West Chester, Pennsylvania from 2003 to 2023, compiling a career college football head coaching record of 217–90. Zwaan was also as the head baseball coach at the United States Merchant Marine Academy in Kings Point, New York from 1983 to 1984 and Widener from 1993 to 1996, amassing career college baseball head coaching record of 67–101–1.

== Head coaching record ==
=== College football ===
Year	Team	Overall	Conference	Standing	Bowl/playoffs
Widener Pioneers (Middle Atlantic Conferences) (1997–2002)
1997	Widener	7–3	3–2	3rd (Commonwealth)	
1998	Widener	8–3	4–1	T–1st (Commonwealth)	
1999	Widener	6–4	3–2	T–2nd (Commonwealth)	
2000	Widener	12–2	5–0	1st (Commonwealth)	L NCAA Division III Semifinal
2001	Widener	12–1	10–0	1st	L NCAA Division III Quarterfinal
2002	Widener	9–1	8–1	T–1st	
Widener:		54–14	33–6		
West Chester Golden Rams (Pennsylvania State Athletic Conference) (2003–2023)
2003	West Chester	8–3	4–2	3rd (East)	
2004	West Chester	11–4	6–0	1st (East)	L NCAA Division II Semifinal
2005	West Chester	8–4	5–1	2nd (East)	L NCAA Division II First Round
2006	West Chester	9–4	5–1	2nd (East)	L NCAA Division II Second Round
2007	West Chester	9–3	5–0	1st (East)	L NCAA Division II First Round
2008	West Chester	9–4	7–0	1st (East)	L NCAA Division II Second Round
2009	West Chester	7–4	5–2	T–2nd (East)	
2010	West Chester	4–7	4–3	4th (East)	
2011	West Chester	5–6	4–3	T–4th (East)	
2012	West Chester	7–4	4–3	T–3rd (East)	
2013	West Chester	13–2	6–1	T–1st (East)	L NCAA Division II Semifinal
2014	West Chester	11–2	8–1	2nd (East)	L NCAA Division II Second Round
2015	West Chester	7–4	6–1	1st (East)	
2016	West Chester	8–3	6–1	2nd (East)	
2017	West Chester	9–4	6–1	T–1st (East)	L NCAA Division II Second Round
2018	West Chester	10–1	6–0	1st (East)	L NCAA Division II First Round
2019	West Chester	9–3	5–2	3rd (East)	L NCAA Division II First Round
2020–21	No team—COVID-19				
2021	West Chester	6–5	4–3	4th (East)	
2022	West Chester	7–4	4–3	T–3rd (East)	
2023	West Chester	6–5	3–4	T–4th (East)	
West Chester:		163–76	103–32		
Total:		217–90			
National championship Conference title Conference division title or championship game berth

== See also ==
- List of college football career coaching wins leaders
