= Hubert Jack Stadium =

Stadium in Pennsylvania, United States

Coordinates: 41.1437°N 77.4689°W

Hubert Jack Stadium is home of the Lock Haven Bald Eagles football team. The stadium serves multi-purpose events. The stadium has a capacity of 3,500. The stadium includes a two-story press box for several televised games that take place throughout each season.
