= McConnell Family Stadium =

Stadium in Erie, Pennsylvania, US

- Location within Pennsylvania Location within the United States
- Interactive map of McConnell Family Stadium
- Former names: Gannon University Field (2001–2015)
- Address: Erie, Pennsylvania
- Coordinates: 42.129000°N 80.091228°W
- Owner: Gannon University
- Operator: Gannon University
- Capacity: 2,500
- Surface: Fieldturf

Construction
- Opened: 2001

Tenants
- Gannon Golden Knights (NCAA); Erie Commodores FC (NPSL) 2013; 2016–present

McConnell Family Stadium, formerly Gannon University Field, is a 2,500-seat multi-purpose stadium in Erie, Pennsylvania, United States on the campus of Gannon University.

== Overview ==
The artificial surface field is used by several Gannon University sports teams, including: football, soccer, lacrosse, baseball and softball. Movable stands provide for a maximum seating of 2,500 spectators.

Gannon University Field opened during the spring of 2001. It was renamed McConnell Family Stadium on September 11, 2015, in honor of a donation made by Gannon University Class of 1970 alumnus Dennis McConnell. The Gannon University women's lacrosse team was the first to play on the field.
