= Biemesderfer Stadium =

Stadium in Millersville, Pennsylvania

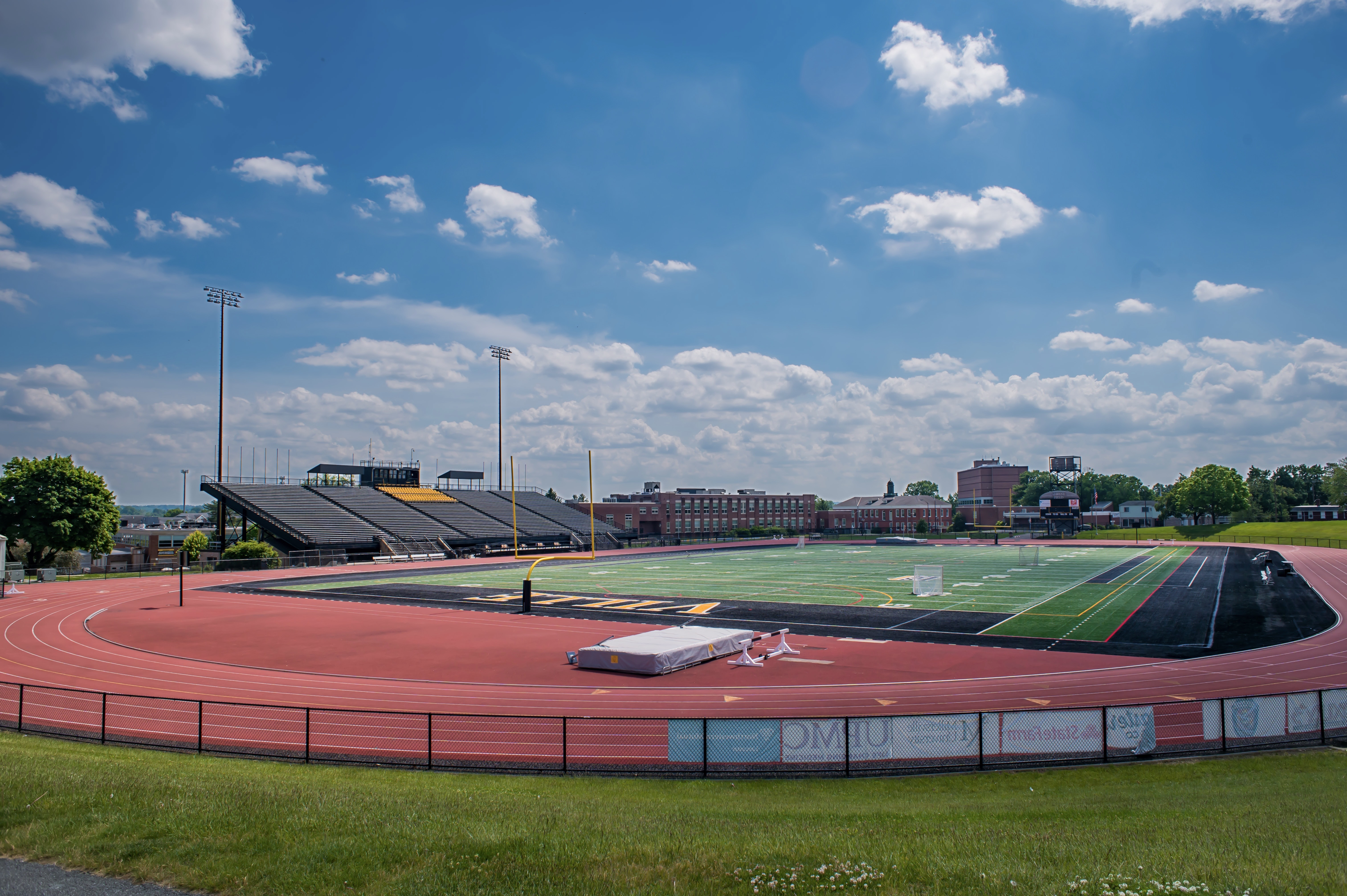
- Interactive map of Biemesderfer Stadium
- Location: 1 South George Street, Millersville, PA 17551
- Coordinates: 40°0′6″N 76°21′13″W
- Owner: Millersville University of Pennsylvania
- Operator: Millersville University of Pennsylvania
- Capacity: 4,300
- Surface: Artificial turf

Construction
- Groundbreaking: 1958
- Opened: 1970
- Cost: $450,000

Tenant
- Millersville Marauders (NCAA) (1970-present)

Biemesderfer Stadium is an American football stadium at Millersville University of Pennsylvania. It is located in Millersville, Pennsylvania.

== History and architectural features ==
Originally known as Biemesderfer Field, this sports stadium has been the home stadium of the Marauders' football team since 1958. It was designed and built for a price of $450,000 and opened in 1970.

Biemesderfer Stadium was named for Daniel Luke Biemesderfer, who was Millersville University's ninth president from 1943 to 1965.

In 1985, a lighting system was added to allow night games to be played at the stadium.
