= Seth Grove Stadium =

Stadium in Shippensburg, Pennsylvania

- Interactive map of Seth Grove Stadium
- Location: 1871 Old Main Drive Shippensburg, PA 17257
- Coordinates: 40.0643°N 77.5253°W
- Owner: Shippensburg University
- Operator: Shippensburg University
- Capacity: 7,700
- Surface: FieldTurf

Construction
- Opened: 1972

Tenants
- Shippensburg Red Raiders, PIAA state track and field championships

Seth Grove Stadium is a stadium on the campus of Shippensburg University in Shippensburg, Pennsylvania. The stadium is named for the late J. Seth Grove, former faculty member and coach at Shippensburg. The stadium was built in 1972 and has a capacity of 7,700. 6,700 seats in the main grandstand and 1,000 seats on the visitors’ side of the field.

== History ==
Originally it had a capacity of 7,600. From 1987 to 1989, temporary bleachers were set up beyond the north end zone for football games and commencement, boosting the capacity to 8,200. In 1990, the 900-seat bleacher set on the visitors’ side was removed for safety reasons and the 600 temporary seats were moved from the end zone to the visitors’ side, giving the stadium a capacity of 7,300. In 1991, the new visitors’ bleachers were built, reaching the current capacity of 7,700. If necessary, temporary bleachers can be added to the end zone.

The grass playing surface at Seth Grove Stadium was replaced with Fieldturf in the summer of 2010. It is primarily used for the Shippensburg Red Raiders American football and track and field team events.

== Track and field ==
Seth Grove Stadium has been home to the Red Raider track and field teams since 1972. One of the finest track and field facilities in the East, the stadium features an eight-lane Rekortan track. Located outside the stadium are two discus and two shot put circles. The javelin runway also has a Rekortan surface.

Shippensburg University most recently hosted the PSAC Outdoor Track and Field Championships at Seth Grove Stadium in 2007 and regularly hosts the Paul Kaiser Classic each April from the facility.

Seth Grove is also the site of the PIAA state track and field championships. The largest crowd to ever attend an event at the stadium was 12,000 for the 1976 PIAA track and field championships. The total included the spectators at the throwing events area to the north of the main grandstand.
