= Farrell Stadium =

Stadium in West Chester, Pennsylvania, US

Tomlinson–Fillippo Field at Farrell Stadium
- Location in Pennsylvania Location in the United States
- Former names: John A. Farrell Stadium (1970–2024)
- Location: West Chester, Pennsylvania
- Coordinates: 39.937020°N 75.601167°W
- Owner: West Chester University
- Operator: West Chester University
- Capacity: 7,500
- Surface: FieldTurf (playing surface); Mondo (track surface)

Construction
- Opened: September 26, 1970
- Renovated: 2006, 2020

Tenants
- West Chester Golden Rams football and track (1970–present); Philadelphia Independence (WPS) (2010)

Tomlinson–Fillippo Field at Farrell Stadium is an American stadium on the campus of West Chester University in West Chester, Pennsylvania. Built in 1970, it is primarily used by the school's football and track and field teams.

== Description ==
John A. Farrell Stadium was constructed in 1970, replacing a previous stadium of the same name located on the northern portion of the campus.

The stadium served as the temporary home of the Philadelphia Independence of the Women's Professional Soccer (WPS) league during its inaugural season. Additionally, Farrell Stadium was home to the Philadelphia Eagles for its summer training camp from 1980 to 1995.

A statue of Michael Horrocks resides at the north endzone of the field. Horrocks, a former Golden Rams quarterback, died in the September 11 attacks in 2001; he was a co-pilot on United Airlines Flight 175.

In 2024, the school announced the stadium would be renamed to "Tomlinson–Fillippo Field at Farrell Stadium" in honor of Tommy Tomlinson and Tom Fillippo, two former Golden Rams football players.

In 2025, a new state-of-the-art video scoreboard was installed.
