= 2017 NCAA Division II football rankings =

- Season: 2017
- Postseason: Single-elimination
- Preseason No. 1: NW Missouri State
- National champions: Texas A&M–Commerce
- Conference with most teams in final AFCA poll: GSC (4)

The 2017 NCAA Division II football rankings are from the American Football Coaches Association (AFCA). This is for the 2017 season.

== Legend ==
	Increase in ranking
	Decrease in ranking
	Not ranked previous week or no change
	Selected for College Football Playoff
(#–#)	Win–loss record
(Italics)	Number of first place votes
т	Tied with team above or below also with this symbol

== American Football Coaches Association poll ==
	Preseason	Week 1 Sep 5	Week 2 Sep 12	Week 3 Sep 19	Week 4 Sep 26	Week 5 Oct 3	Week 6 Oct 10	Week 7 Oct 17	Week 8 Oct 24	Week 9 Oct 31	Week 10 Nov 7	Week 11 Nov 14	Week 12 (Final) Dec 20	
1.	Northwest Missouri State 34	Northwest Missouri State (1–0) 34	Northwest Missouri State (2–0) 34	Northwest Missouri State (3–0) 34	Northwest Missouri State (4–0) 34	Northwest Missouri State (5–0) 34	Northwest Missouri State (6–0) 34	Northwest Missouri State (7–0) 34	Northwest Missouri State (8–0) 34	Minnesota State (9–0) 10	Minnesota State (10–0) 21	Minnesota State (11–0)	Texas A&M–Commerce (14–1) 33	1.
2.	Grand Valley State	Ferris State (0–0)	Ferris State (1–0)	Ferris State (2–0)	Texas A&M–Commerce (4–0)	Texas A&M–Commerce (4–0)	Shepherd (5–0)	Shepherd (6–0)	Shepherd (7–0)	Shepherd (8–0) 22	Shepherd (9–0) 7	Shepherd (10–0)	West Florida (11–4)	2.
3.	Ferris State	Texas A&M–Commerce (1–0)	Texas A&M–Commerce (2–0)	Texas A&M–Commerce (3–0)	Shepherd (3–0)	Shepherd (4–0)	IUP (6–0)	IUP (7–0)	Minnesota State (8–0)	IUP (9–0) 2	IUP (10–0) 2	IUP (11–0)	IUP (13–1)	3.
4.	Emporia State	Shepherd (1–0)	Shepherd (1–0)	Shepherd (2–0)	IUP (4–0)	IUP (5–0)	Minnesota State (6–0)	Minnesota State (7–0)	IUP (8–0)	Midwestern State (7–0)	Midwestern State (8–0)	Fort Hays State (11–0)	Minnesota State (13–1)	4.
5.	Texas A&M–Commerce	California (PA) (1–0)	California (PA) (2–0)	California (PA) (3–0)	California (PA) (4–0)	Minnesota State (5–0)	Indianapolis (6–0)	Midwestern State (5–0)	Midwestern State (6–0)	Indianapolis (9–0)	Fort Hays State (10–0) 4	Midwestern State (9–0)	Ferris State (11–2)	5.
6.	North Alabama	IUP (1–0)	IUP (2–0)	IUP (3–0)	Minnesota State (4–0)	Sioux Falls (5–0)	Midwestern State (4–0)	Indianapolis (7–0)	Indianapolis (8–0)	Fort Hays State (9–0)	Indianapolis (10–0)	Indianapolis (11–0)	Harding (11–4)	6.
7.	Shepherd	CSU Pueblo (1–0)	Sioux Falls (2–0)	Sioux Falls (3–0)	Sioux Falls (4–0)	Indianapolis (5–0)	Grand Valley State (5–1)	Grand Valley State (6–1)	Fort Hays State (8–0)	Central Washington (9–0)	Central Washington (10–0)	Central Washington (11–0)	Central Washington (11–1)	7.
8.	California (PA)	Azusa Pacific (1–0)	Minnesota State (2–0)	Minnesota State (3–0)	Colorado Mesa (4–0)	Grand Valley State (4–1)	Fort Hays State (6–0)	Fort Hays State (7–0)	Central Washington (8–0)	Northwest Missouri State (8–1)	Assumption (9–0)	Texas A&M–Commerce (9–1)	Fort Hays State (11–1)	8.
9.	IUP	Sioux Falls (1–0)	LIU Post (2–0)	LIU Post (3–0)	Grand Valley State (3–1)	Delta State (5–0)	Slippery Rock (6–0)	Central Washington (7–0)	Texas A&M–Commerce (6–1)	Texas A&M–Commerce (7–1)	Texas A&M–Commerce (8–1)	Ashland (10–1)	Assumption (11–2)	9.
10.	Minnesota–Duluth	LIU Post (1–0)	North Alabama (0–1)	North Alabama (1–1)	Indianapolis (4–0)	Midwestern State (3–0)	Central Washington (6–0)	Texas A&M–Commerce (5–1)	Winona State (8–0)	Assumption (8–0)	Ashland (9–1)	Ferris State (9–1)	Ashland (11–2)	10.
11.	Valdosta State	North Alabama (0–1)	Colorado Mesa (2–0)	Colorado Mesa (3–0)	Arkansas Tech (4–0)	Fort Hays State (5–0)	Texas A&M–Commerce (4–1)	Winona State (7–0)	Ferris State (6–1)	Ashland (8–1)	Ferris State (8–1)	Virginia State (10–0)	Midwestern State (10–1)	11.
12.	CSU Pueblo	Minnesota State (1–0)	Grand Valley State (1–1)	Grand Valley State (2–1)	Midwestern State (2–0)	Slippery Rock (5–0)	CSU Pueblo (5–1)	Ferris State (5–1)	Ashland (7–1)	Ferris State (7–1)	Wingate (9–0)	Winona State (10–1)	West Alabama (10–3)	12.
13.	Azusa Pacific	Central Missouri (1–0)	Midwestern State (1–0)	Midwestern State (2–0)	Delta State (4–0)	Central Washington (5–0)	Winona State (6–0)	Ashland (6–1)	Assumption (7–0)	Sioux Falls (8–1)	Sioux Falls (9–1)	Northwest Missouri State (9–2)	Indianapolis (11–1)	13.
14.	LIU Post	Grand Valley State (0–1)	Emporia State (1–1)	Indianapolis (3–0)	Fort Hays State (4–0)	CSU Pueblo (4–1)	Bowie State (6–0)	Assumption (6–0)	Sioux Falls (7–1)	Wingate (8–0)	Colorado Mesa (9–1)	Bowie State (9–1)	Shepherd (10–1)	14.
15.	Harding	Emporia State (0–1)	Indianapolis (2–0)	Emporia State (2–1)	Ferris State (2–1)	Ferris State (3–1)	Ferris State (4–1)	Sioux Falls (6–1)	Colorado Mesa (7–1)	Colorado Mesa (8–1)	Virginia State (9–0)	Assumption (9–1)	Winona State (10–2)	15.
16.	Colorado Mines	Midwestern State (1–0)	Albany State (2–0)	Arkansas Tech (3–0)	Central Washington (4–0)	California (PA) (4–1)	Ashland (5–1)	Colorado Mesa (6–1)	Wingate (7–0)	Virginia State (8–0)	Humboldt State (8–1)	Wingate (9–1)	Northwest Missouri State (9–3)	16.
17.	Sioux Falls	Colorado Mesa (1–0)	West Georgia (2–0)	Delta State (3–0)	CSU Pueblo (3–1)	Humboldt State (4–0)	Assumption (5–0)	Slippery Rock (6–1)	Virginia State (7–0)	Humboldt State (7–1)	Winona State (9–1)	West Alabama (9–2)	CSU Pueblo (9–3)	17.
18.	Southwest Baptist	Indianapolis (1–0)	CSU Pueblo (1–1)	Fort Hays State (3–0)	Slippery Rock (4–0)	Ashland (4–1)	Sioux Falls (5–1)	West Alabama (6–1)	Humboldt State (6–1)	Winona State (8–1)	Northwest Missouri State (8–2)	Sioux Falls (9–2)	Virginia State (10–1)	18.
19.	UNC Pembroke	Winston–Salem State (1–0)	Arkansas Tech (2–0)	CSU Pueblo (2–1)	Humboldt State (3–0)	Bowie State (5–0)	Southeastern Oklahoma State (6–0)	Delta State (6–1)	Grand Valley State (6–2)	Grand Valley State (7–2)	Bowie State (9–1)	Shippensburg (10–1)	West Georgia (9–4)	19.
20.	Minnesota State	Albany State (1–0)	Minnesota–Duluth (1–1)	Central Washington (3–0)	Ashland (3–1)	Assumption (5–0)	Colorado Mesa (5–1)	Wingate (6–0)	Bowie State (7–1)	Bowie State (8–1)	Eastern New Mexico (8–1)	CSU Pueblo (9–2)	Sioux Falls (9–3)	20.
21.	Central Missouri	Minnesota–Duluth (0–1)	Fort Hays State (2–0)	Slippery Rock (3–0)	Bowie State (4–0)	Colorado Mesa (4–1)	Delta State (5–1)	Virginia State (6–0)	Eastern New Mexico (6–1)	Eastern New Mexico (7–1)	Findlay (9–1)	Humboldt State (8–2)	Delta State (9–4)	21.
22.	Southern Arkansas	Tuskegee (1–0)	Azusa Pacific (1–1)	Humboldt State (2–0)	Assumption (4–0)	Winona State (5–0)	West Georgia (5–1)	Humboldt State (5–1)	Findlay (7–1)	Findlay (8–1)	West Alabama (8–2)	Colorado Mesa (9–2)	Findlay (10–3)	22.
23.	Southeastern Oklahoma State	Henderson State (1–0)	Central Washington (2–0)	Bowie State (3–0)	Catawba (4–0)	Southeastern Oklahoma State (5–0)	West Alabama (5–1)	Bowie State (6–1)	Central Missouri (6–2)	West Alabama (7–2)	CSU Pueblo (8–2)	Minnesota–Duluth (9–2)	Bowie State (9–2)	23.
24.	Midwestern State	West Chester (1–0)	Delta State (2–0)	Assumption (3–0)	LIU Post (3–1)	Arkansas Tech (4–1)	Wingate (5–0)	Eastern New Mexico (6–1)	CSU Pueblo (6–2)	CSU Pueblo (7–2)	West Georgia (8–2)	Eastern New Mexico (8–2)	Wingate (9–2)	24.
25.	Bemidji State	West Georgia (1–0)	Slippery Rock (2–0)	Catawba (3–0)	Winona State (4–0)	West Georgia (4–1)	Humboldt State (4–1)	Southeastern Oklahoma State (6–1)	West Alabama (6–2)	West Georgia (7–2)	Shippensburg (9–1)	Ouachita Baptist (9–2)	Shippensburg (10–2)	25.
	Preseason	Week 1 Sep 5	Week 2 Sep 12	Week 3 Sep 19	Week 4 Sep 26	Week 5 Oct 3	Week 6 Oct 10	Week 7 Oct 17	Week 8 Oct 24	Week 9 Oct 31	Week 10 Nov 7	Week 11 Nov 14	Week 12 (Final) Dec 20	
		Dropped: 11 Valdosta State; 15 Harding; 16 Colorado Mines; 18 Southwest Baptist; 19 UNC Pembroke; 22 Southern Arkansas; 25 Bemidji State	Dropped: 13 Central Missouri; 19 Winston–Salem State; 22 Tuskegee; 23 Henderson State; 24 West Chester	Dropped: 16 Albany State; 17 West Georgia; 20 Minnesota–Duluth; 22 Azusa Pacific	Dropped: 10 North Alabama; 15 Emporia State	Dropped: 23 Catawba; 24 LIU Post	Dropped: 16 California (PA); 24 Arkansas Tech	Dropped: 12 CSU Pueblo; 22 West Georgia	Dropped: 17 Slippery Rock; 19 Delta State; 25 Southeastern Oklahoma State	Dropped: 23 Central Missouri	Dropped: 19 Grand Valley State	Dropped: 21 Findlay; 24 West Georgia	Dropped: 21 Humboldt State; 22 Colorado Mesa; 23 Minnesota–Duluth; 24 Eastern New Mexico; 25 Ouachita Baptist	
