= PSAC Football Championship Game =

Annual college football game

Pennsylvania State Athletic Conference Football Championship Game
- Sport: Football
- Conference: Pennsylvania State Athletic Conference
- Number of teams: 2 (One from each division)
- Current stadium: campus sites
- Current location: campus sites
- Played: 1960–present
- Last contest: November 15, 2025
- Current champion: Kutztown (5th title)
- Most championships: West Chester and Bloomsburg, 16

The Pennsylvania State Athletic Conference Football Championship Game or PSAC Football Championship is a yearly American football championship game between two Pennsylvania State Athletic Conference teams (East and West division champions) to decide the champions of the PSAC.

The championship games date back to 1960 where West Chester was the first to win, however champions had been selected by sportswriters and the Saylor Point System since 1934. Champions have been decided every year since then, except for three years during World War II, and in 2020 during the COVID-19 pandemic when PSAC did not compete.

Home advantage alternates each year, with the east division champion hosting every odd-numbered year and the west division champion hosting every even-numbered year.

== List of champions ==
=== Prior to Championship Game ===
Year	Champion
1934	IUP
1935	Shippensburg
1936	Lock Haven
1937	Lock Haven
1938	Mansfield
1939	Slippery Rock
1940	IUP/Millersville
1941	Millersville
1942	East Stroudsburg
1943	No Champion
1944	No Champion
1945	No Champion
1946	California (PA)
1947	Mansfield
1948	Bloomsburg
1949	Bloomsburg
1950	West Chester
1951	Bloomsburg
1952	West Chester
1953	West Chester
1954	Bloomsburg/East Stroudsburg /West Chester
1955	Bloomsburg
1956	West Chester
1957	Lock Haven/Shippensburg
1958	California (PA)
1959	West Chester

In 1943, 1944, 1945 no teams competed in PSAC play due to WWII.

=== Championship Game ===
Year	Champion	Score	Loser
1960	West Chester	35–6	Lock Haven
1961	West Chester	21–0	Slippery Rock
1962	Slippery Rock	13–6	East Stroudsburg
1963	West Chester	36–7	Slippery Rock
1964	East Stroudsburg	27–14	IUP
1965	East Stroudsburg	26–10	IUP
1966	Clarion	28–26	West Chester
1967	West Chester	27–7	Clarion
1968	California (PA)	28–28	East Stroudsburg
1969	West Chester	41–34	Clarion
1970	Edinboro	14–6	West Chester
1971	West Chester	35–14	Edinboro
1972	Slippery Rock	29–27	West Chester
1973	Slippery Rock	28–14	West Chester
1974	Slippery Rock	20–7	West Chester
1975	East Stroudsburg	24–20	Edinboro
1976	East Stroudsburg	14–14	Shippensburg
1977	Clarion	25–24	Millersville
1978	East Stroudsburg	49–3	Clarion
1979	Lock Haven	48–14	Cheney
1980	Clarion	15–14	Kutztown
1981	Shippensburg	34–17	Millersville
1982	East Stroudsburg	24–22	Edinboro
1983	Clarion	27–14	East Stroudsburg
1984	California (PA)	21–14	Bloomsburg
1985	Bloomsburg	31–9	IUP
1986	IUP	20–6	West Chester
1987	IUP	21–9	West Chester
2008	California (PA)	47–36	West Chester
2009	Shippensburg	42–35	California (PA)
2010	Mercyhurst	56–37	Bloomsburg
2011	Kutztown	21–14	Slippery Rock
2012	IUP	41–10	Shippensburg
2013	Bloomsburg	42–38	Slippery Rock
2014	Slippery Rock	28–26	Bloomsburg
2015	Slippery Rock	61–12	West Chester
2016	California (PA)	49–7	Kutztown
2017	IUP	24–7	West Chester
2018	West Chester	33–10	Slippery Rock
2019	Slippery Rock	37–35	Kutztown
2020	Canceled due to the COVID-19 pandemic		
2021	Kutztown	38–32	Slippery Rock
2022	IUP	24–21	Shepherd
2023	Kutztown	31–7	Slippery Rock
2024	Kutztown	21–14	California (PA)
2025	Kutztown	28–23	IUP

== Championships by team ==
Schools that no longer play PSAC football are in italics.

#	School	Championships
T–1	Bloomsburg	16
T–1	West Chester	16
3	Slippery Rock	13
4	East Stroudsburg	12
5	California	9
6	Millersville	8
T–7	Shippensburg	7
T–7	IUP	7
T–9	Clarion	6
T–9	Edinboro	6
11	Kutztown	5
12	Lock Haven	4
13	Mansfield	2
14	Mercyhurst	1

Notes

- Mansfield no longer plays full-sized football, opting instead to sponsor sprint football, a variant that uses standard NCAA football rules but restricts player weights to a maximum of 178 pounds (81 kg).
- One other PSAC member, Pitt–Johnstown, does not sponsor football.
- Among current PSAC members that sponsor football, three have never won the conference title—Gannon, Seton Hill, and Shepherd. All are among the conference's newer members; Gannon joined in 2008, Seton Hill in 2013, and Shepherd in 2019.
