= East Stroudsburg University =

University in East Stroudsburg, Pennsylvania, US

Coordinates: 40.995°N 75.172°W

East Stroudsburg University of Pennsylvania
- Former names: East Stroudsburg Normal School (1893–1920); East Stroudsburg State Normal School (1920–1927); East Stroudsburg State Teachers College (1927–1960); East Stroudsburg State College (1960–1983)
- Type: Public
- Established: 1893
- President: Kenneth Long
- Faculty: 280
- Administrative staff: 400
- Students: 7,234
- Undergraduates: 6,099
- Postgraduates: 1,135
- Location: East Stroudsburg, Pennsylvania, U.S.
- Campus: Suburban, 213 acres (0.9 km^{2})
- Colors: Black and red
- Nickname: Warriors
- Sporting affiliations: NCAA Division II - PSAC
- Website: esu.edu
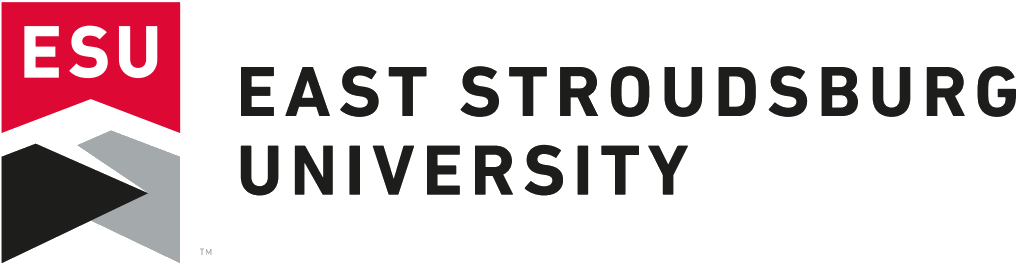

East Stroudsburg University of Pennsylvania (ESU) is a public university in East Stroudsburg, Pennsylvania. It is part of the Pennsylvania State System of Higher Education (PASSHE).

== History ==
What today is East Stroudsburg University of Pennsylvania was founded in 1893 as a private preparatory school for teachers and then known as the East Stroudsburg Normal School. Ownership was transferred to the Commonwealth of Pennsylvania in 1920, and the name was changed to East Stroudsburg State Normal School. In 1927, the right to confer the degrees of Bachelor of Science in education and Bachelor of Science in health education was granted, and the school's name then became the East Stroudsburg State Teachers College. In 1960, additional curricula were added and the school's name then became East Stroudsburg State College. The State System of Higher Education was authorized by Senate Bill 506 to assume its current name in 1983.

== Campus ==
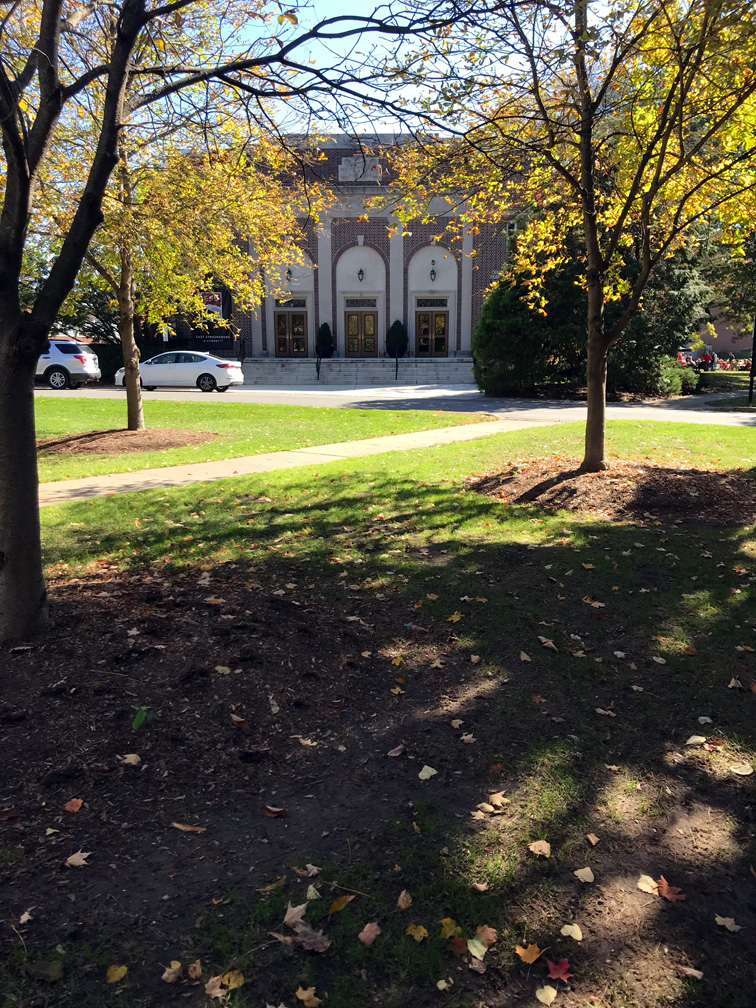
Abeloff Center for the Performing Arts sits on the main University Circle entrance of the university.

East Stroudsburg University is situated in the borough of East Stroudsburg, located in the Pocono Mountains of Northeastern Pennsylvania. The university is 48.2 miles (77.6 km) southeast of the Scranton/Wilkes-Barre area and 41.9 miles (67.4 km) northeast of Allentown. The New Jersey border is 2 miles (3 km) away and the campus is approximately 75.3 miles (121.2 km) from New York City and 101.6 miles (160 km) from Philadelphia. The neighboring borough of Stroudsburg is the seat and cultural center of Monroe County. The university is accessible from Interstate 80, U.S. Route 209, and PA Route 33. Lehigh Valley Hospital-Pocono, the area's primary medical facility, is located on the edge of the campus.

The 62 campus buildings are located on 213 acres (0.9 km^{2}) in the East Stroudsburg community. In addition to the academic facilities, seven residence halls (housing 2,200 students), and a 1,000-seat dining hall are located on campus. The Student Activity Association, Inc., owns Stony Acres, a 119-acre (0.5 km^{2}) off-campus student recreation area near Marshalls Creek, that includes a lodge, several cabins, a campsite, recreation areas and a lake. The campus is patrolled by the East Stroudsburg University Police Department.

=== Buildings ===
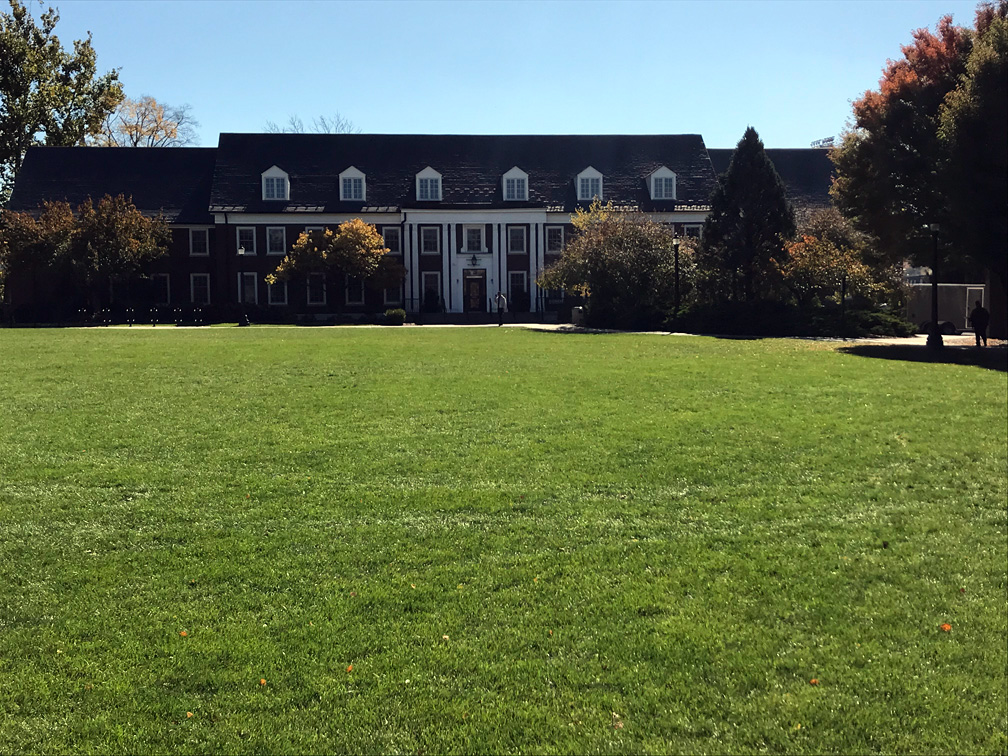
Monroe Hall houses the Speech-Language Pathology and Communications Studies departments and is one of the oldest buildings on campus.

In 2003, ESU opened its recreation center. This recreational facility contains an elevated indoor track, several basketball courts, racquetball rooms, various free weight and weight machines as well as cardio machines. In addition to individual programs, there are also group fitness programs ranging from the normal (step aerobics and yoga). In 2010, this building was named for Dr. Mattioli, thus becoming the "Mattioli Recreation Center".

In September 2006, ESU began construction on the new Science and Technology Center. The Science and Technology Center is the first new major academic building since 1979. The $40,000,000 building houses chemistry, math, computer science, and other various science departments. With 120,000 square feet (11,000 m^{2}), the building includes research and classroom space, planetarium, heated celestial observation room, as well as offices for the relocated departments. The building officially opened on September 26, 2008.

== Academics ==
East Stroudsburg University of Pennsylvania offers 68 undergraduate major programs with 24 available concentrations, the largest of which (by enrollment) are Health and Physical Education K-12, Elementary Education, Biological Sciences, Business Management, Computer Science, Psychology, and Secondary Education. ESU has majors in Health Services Administration and Industrial Physics as well as graduate study programs. ESU's extended learning program offers professional development training in Building Information Modeling (BIM). The current student-to-professor ratio stands at 19:1. The breakdown of traditional students consists of 56% female, 44% male, 24% out of state, and 1% international from 9 different countries.

== Student life ==
Undergraduate demographics as of Fall 2023
Race and ethnicity	Total
White	53%
Black	21%
Hispanic	18%
Two or more races	4%
Asian	2%
Unknown	2%
International student	1%
Economic diversity
Low-income (Note: The percentage of students who received an income-based federal Pell grant intended for low-income students.)	41%
Affluent (Note: The percentage of students who are a part of the American middle class at the bare minimum.)	59%

=== Campus media ===
The student-run Calliope literary magazine publishes student fiction, poetry, creative non-fiction, art and photography, and electronic creative writing. Calliope appears both in print and online editions annually under the auspices of the Department of English. Founded in 1927, the student-run Stroud Courier student newspaper publishes news, feature stories, and opinions weekly on Tuesdays. It appears in print and online and is advised by the Department of English. Radio FM 90.3 WESS is a student operated, non-commercial, FCC-licensed radio station located on the campus of ESU. It has a diversified music format offering music and talk shows and broadcasts of Warriors' home football and basketball games.

== Athletics ==
East Stroudsburg University of Pennsylvania's colors are red and black, and the team nickname is the Warriors. For the 2008–09 academic year, the university's mascot was changed to Burgy the warrior bear. In 2017 a new mascot was unveiled, that of an ancient warrior. All teams compete in the NCAA Division II and within the Pennsylvania State Athletic Conference (PSAC).

There are currently seven male varsity sports available (baseball, basketball, cross country, football, soccer, track & field, and wrestling) and 11 female varsity sports (basketball, cross country, field hockey, golf, lacrosse, soccer, softball, swimming, tennis, track & field, and volleyball). Athletic Training services are provided for each intercollegiate sport.

== Notable alumni ==
- Andrew M. Niebel, Major general, U.S. Marine Corps
- Charlie Brenneman, former professional UFC mixed martial arts fighter
- Christine Donohue, justice of the Supreme Court of Pennsylvania
- Edwin Erickson, former Pennsylvania State Senator
- Vic Fangio, defensive coordinator, Philadelphia Eagles
- James Franklin, head college football coach, Virginia Tech
- Eric Frein, domestic terrorist and murderer behind 2014 Pennsylvania State Police barracks attack
- Patricia McMahon Hawkins, former U.S. ambassador to Togo
- Duane Johnson, professional basketball player, Novo Basquete Brasil
- Ruth Kramer, former All-American Girls Professional Baseball League player
- Marie Kruckel, former All-American Girls Professional Baseball League player
- Kelly Lewis, former Pennsylvania State Representative
- Sally McNeil, former amateur bodybuilder, erotic wrestler, and murderer
- Jane Moffet, former All-American Girls Professional Baseball League player
- Matt Riddle, mixed martial artist and professional wrestler
- Bob Rigby, former professional soccer player
- Jim Saxton, U.S. Congressman
- Jordan White, rock musician
- Ruth Williams, former All-American Girls Professional Baseball League player
