= Cheyney Wolves =

- University: Cheyney University of Pennsylvania
- Nickname: Wolves
- Conference: Independent
- Location: Cheyney, Pennsylvania
- Varsity teams: 3
- Football stadium: O'Shields-Stevenson Stadium
- Basketball arena: Cope Hall
- Colors: Blue and white
- Website: www.cheyneyathletics.com

The Cheyney Wolves are the athletic sports teams for Cheyney University. They compete as an independent and formerly played in the Pennsylvania State Athletic Conference (PSAC). Women's sports include basketball, cheerleading and volleyball. Basketball is the only men's sport the university currently offers as of 2019.

== Basketball ==
The men's basketball program is 7th all-time in NCAA win percentage, including 16 PSAC conference championships, four Final Fours, and one National Championship (1978), as coached by John Chaney, who coached from 1972 to 1982.

In 1982, coached by C. Vivian Stringer, the team competed in the championship game of the inaugural NCAA Division I women's basketball tournament despite being a Division II school. They are the only HBCU to reach a Division I Final Four. After Stringer left in 1983, she was replaced by Winthrop McGriff, who led them to the Final Four in the 1984 NCAA Division I women's basketball tournament, becoming the first Black man to lead a women's team to the Final Four and the only one for three decades.

Both Chaney and Stringer would be inducted into the Naismith Memorial Basketball Hall of Fame, making Cheyney one of three schools to have had future Naismith Hall of Fame men's and women's basketball head coaches employed at the same time.

== Probation ==
During the 2007–08 through 2010–11 academic years, the university violated NCAA rules in the certification of initial, transfer and continuing eligibility involving all sports programs. During the four-year period, numerous student-athletes competed while ineligible due to improper certification. In amateurism certification alone, 109 student-athletes practiced, competed and received travel expenses and/or athletically related financial aid before the university received their amateurism certification status from the NCAA Eligibility Center. The committee also concluded that a former compliance director failed to monitor when she did not follow proper procedures in the certification of student-athletes’ eligibility. The entire athletics program was on probation until August 2019.

For the 2018–19 academic year, Cheyney withdrew from the PSAC and Division II and played that season as an independent. The football team, suspended since being unable to afford the trip to the Turkey Day Classic in November 2017, did not play.

By 2019, the status quo from 2018 to 2019 continued; the Wolves offer only basketball and women's volleyball, both of which primarily play Division III and community college teams. By 2024, cross-country and track and field had been re-added for both men and women.
