= Seton Hill University =

Catholic university in Greensburg, Pennsylvania, US

Coordinates: 40.309°N 79.556°W

- Former names: Seton Hill Schools (1885–1914); Seton Hill Junior College (1914–1918); Seton Hill College (1918–2002)
- Motto: Hazard Yet Forward
- Type: Private university
- Established: 1885
- Affiliations: ACCU; NAICU; CIC; MSA
- Religious affiliation: Catholic Church (Sisters of Charity)
- Endowment: $62.9 million (2024)
- President: Mary C. Finger
- Students: 1,892 (fall 2025)
- Undergraduates: 1,484 (fall 2025)
- Postgraduates: 408 (fall 2025)
- Location: Greensburg, Pennsylvania, U.S.
- Campus: Suburban
- Colors: Crimson and gold
- Nickname: Griffins
- Sporting affiliations: NCAA Division II; PSAC (West)
- Mascot: Griffin
- Website: setonhill.edu
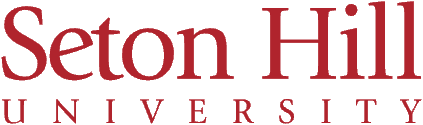

Seton Hill University is a private Catholic university in Greensburg, Pennsylvania, United States. Originally a women's college, it became a coeducational university in 2002 and enrolls about 2,200 students.

== History ==
The school was founded in 1885 by the Sisters of Charity. It is named for Elizabeth Ann Seton, who founded the Sisters of Charity and who, after her death, was canonized as the first US-born saint.

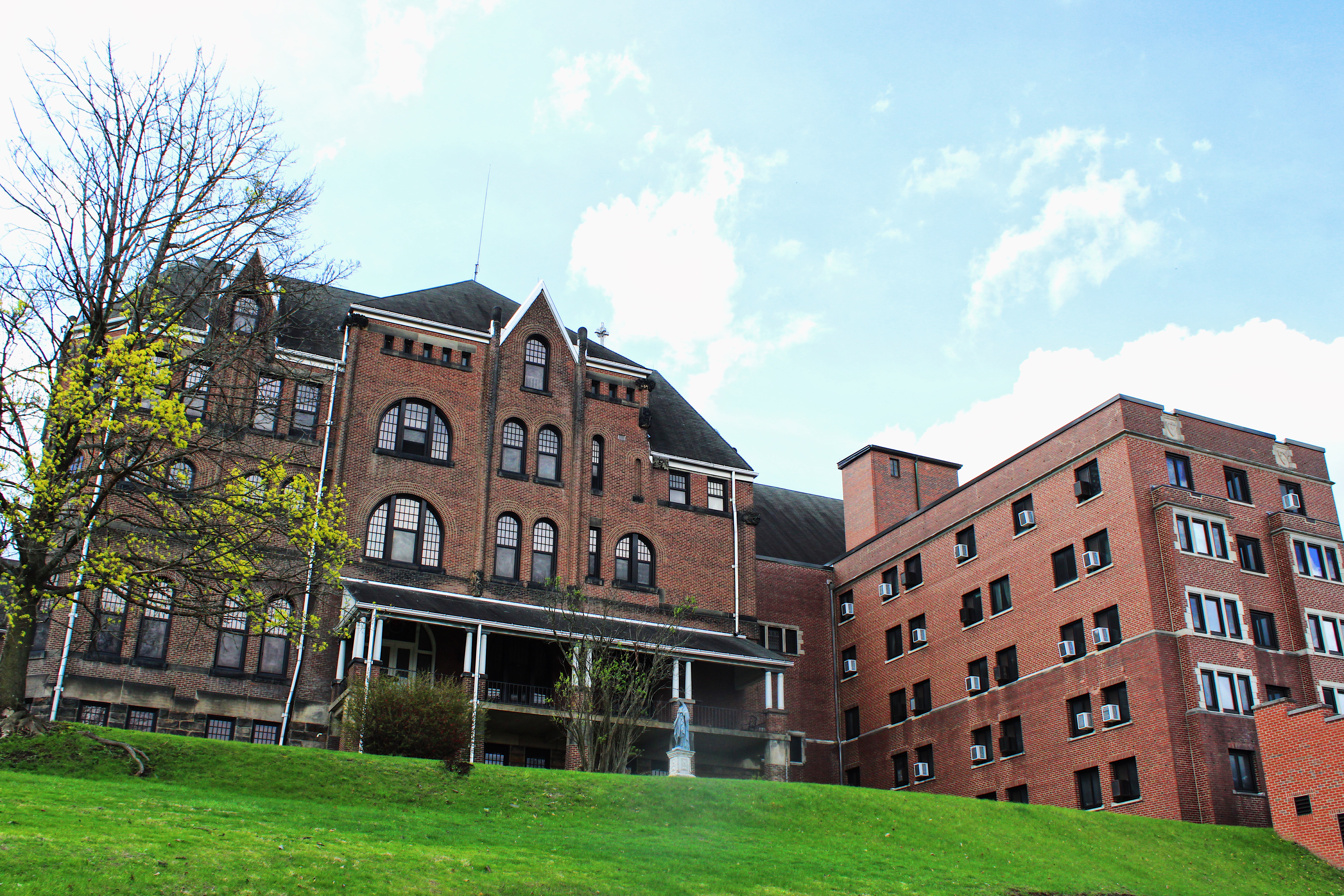
Administration building

In 1914, Seton Hill Junior college was opened by the Sisters of Charity. With the approval of the Commonwealth of Pennsylvania, Seton Hill College was created four years later.

In 1946, 40 male World War II veterans were accepted as students at Seton Hill. During the 1980s, men were regularly admitted to many programs at Seton Hill College, including music and theater. In 2002, Seton Hill was officially granted university status by the Pennsylvania Department of Education.

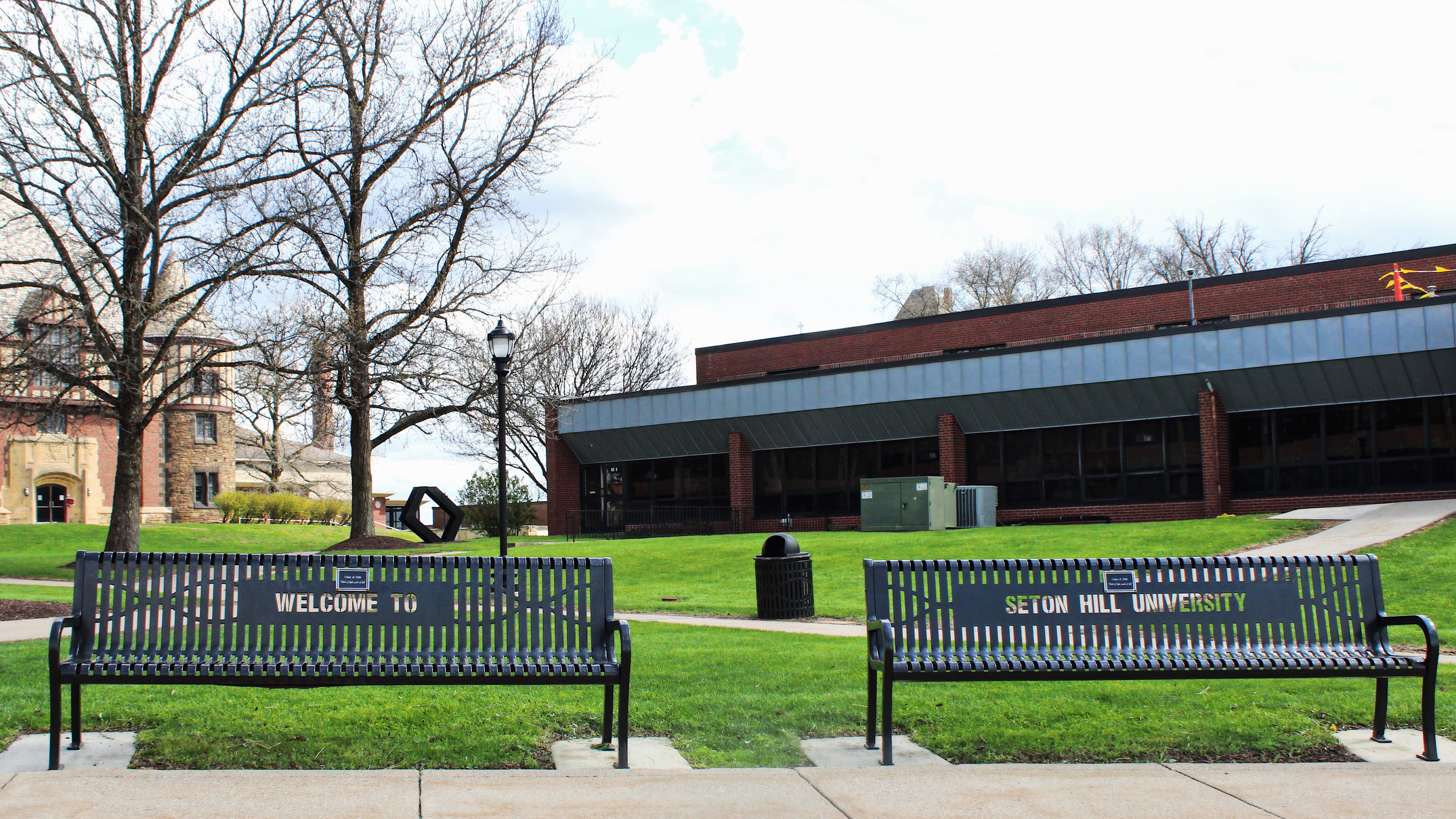
Benches outside of Harvey Hall

Seton Hill University received public attention after announcing a technology plan that includes providing an iPad to all full-time students, as well a 13" MacBook to all incoming freshmen. Upon graduation, students keep both devices.

== Academics ==
Seton Hill divides its undergraduate programs into six schools: Business, Education & Applied Social Sciences, Humanities, Natural & Health Sciences, and Visual & Performing Arts. In addition to their major, all students take liberal arts core classes in arts, mathematics, sciences, culture, history, and writing. The university also offers twelve graduate programs. Subjects include art, writing, education, therapy, business, orthodontics, and physician assistant studies.

The typical class size for courses in the major is about 20–25. Liberal arts core classes tend to be larger, at 30-45 students.

=== LECOM at Seton Hill ===
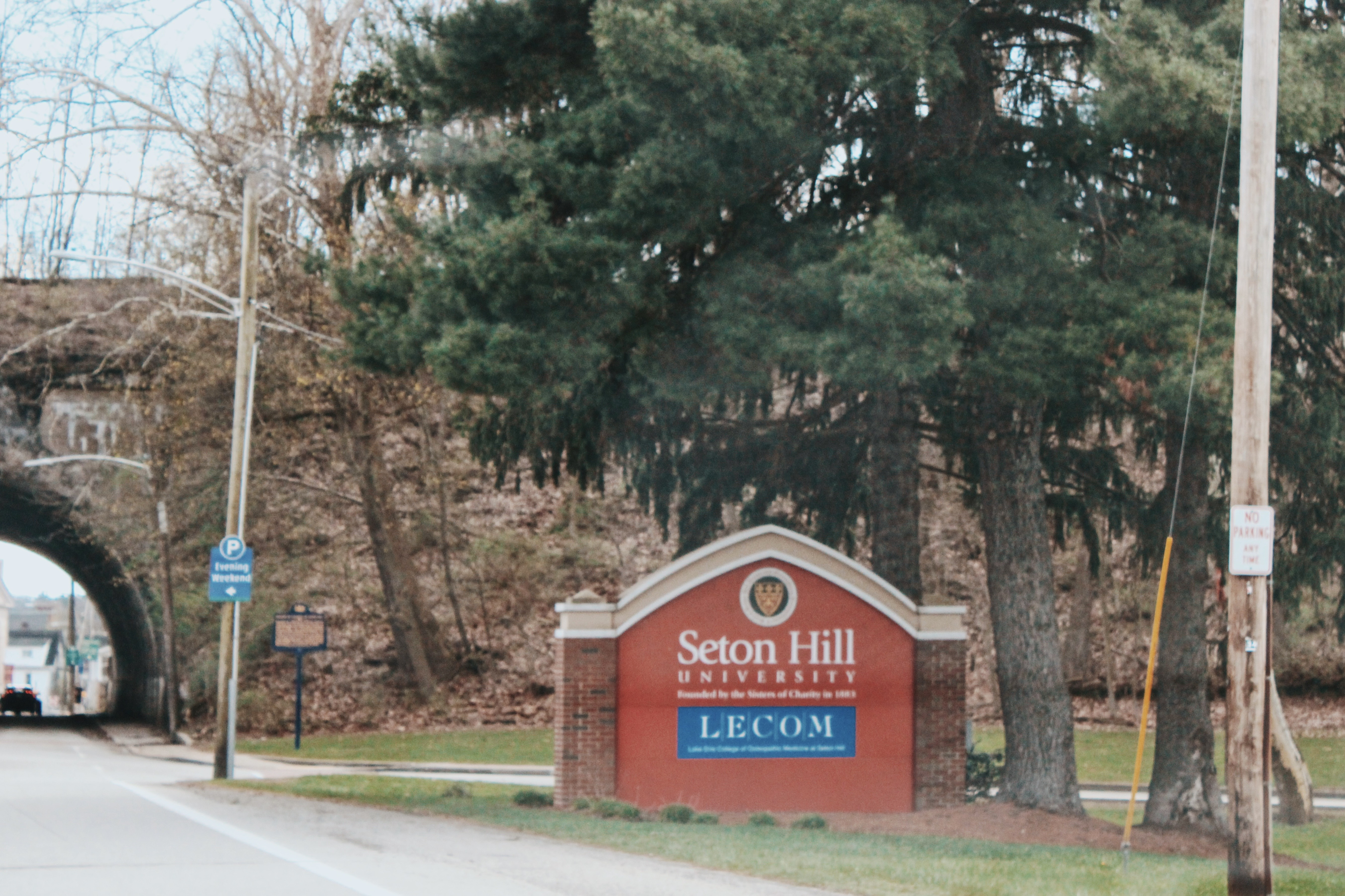
Main entrance sign

LECOM, one of the largest medical schools in the United States, entered a partnership with SHU and extended its LECOM Erie campus to the university in 2009. LECOM at Seton Hill added an additional 104 medical students to the first-year class, and, now, it has graduated more than 1,000 physicians since the first graduating class of 2013.

SHU is also one of LECOM's EAP (Early Acceptance Program) affiliates, allowing qualified high school seniors to apply for its combined BS/DO program and get accepted to LECOM before entering SHU or while studying in the underclassmen years at SHU.

== Athletics ==
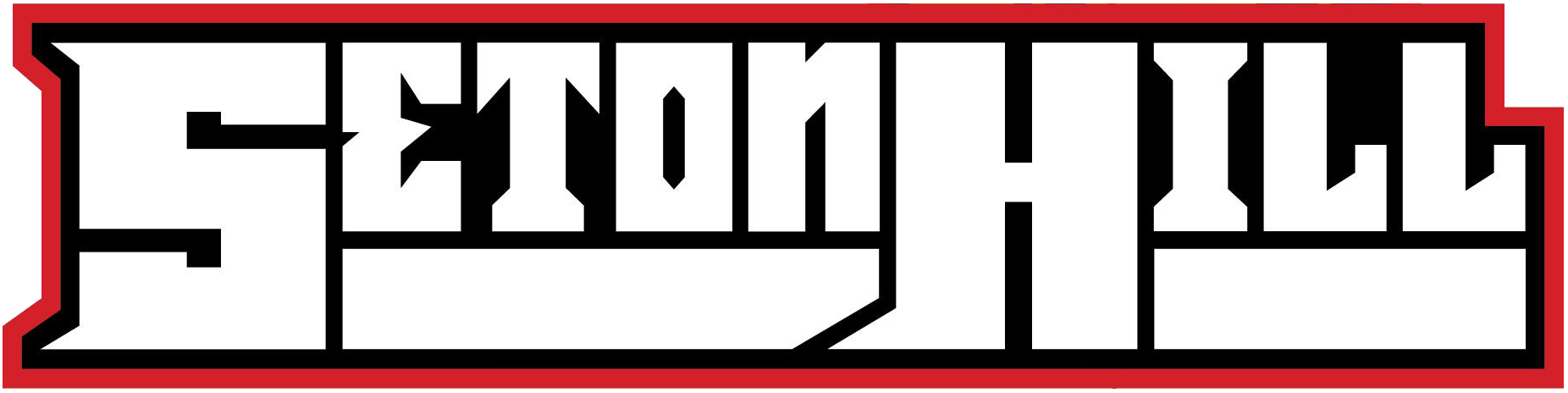
Seton Hill Griffins wordmark

The Seton Hill athletics teams are called the Griffins. The university is a member of the Division II ranks of the National Collegiate Athletic Association (NCAA), primarily competing in the Pennsylvania State Athletic Conference (PSAC) since the 2013–14 academic year. The Griffins previously competed as a member of the West Virginia Intercollegiate Athletic Conference (WVIAC) from 2006–07 to 2012–13; and in the American Mideast Conference of the National Association of Intercollegiate Athletics (NAIA) from 1999–2000 to 2006–07. During the 2006–07 school year, Seton Hill had dual membership with both the NAIA and the NCAA as part of the transition.

Seton Hill competes in 18 intercollegiate varsity sports: Men's sports include baseball, basketball, cross country, football, lacrosse, soccer, track & field and wrestling; while women's sports include basketball, cross country, equestrian, golf, lacrosse, soccer, softball, tennis, track & field and volleyball.

=== History ===
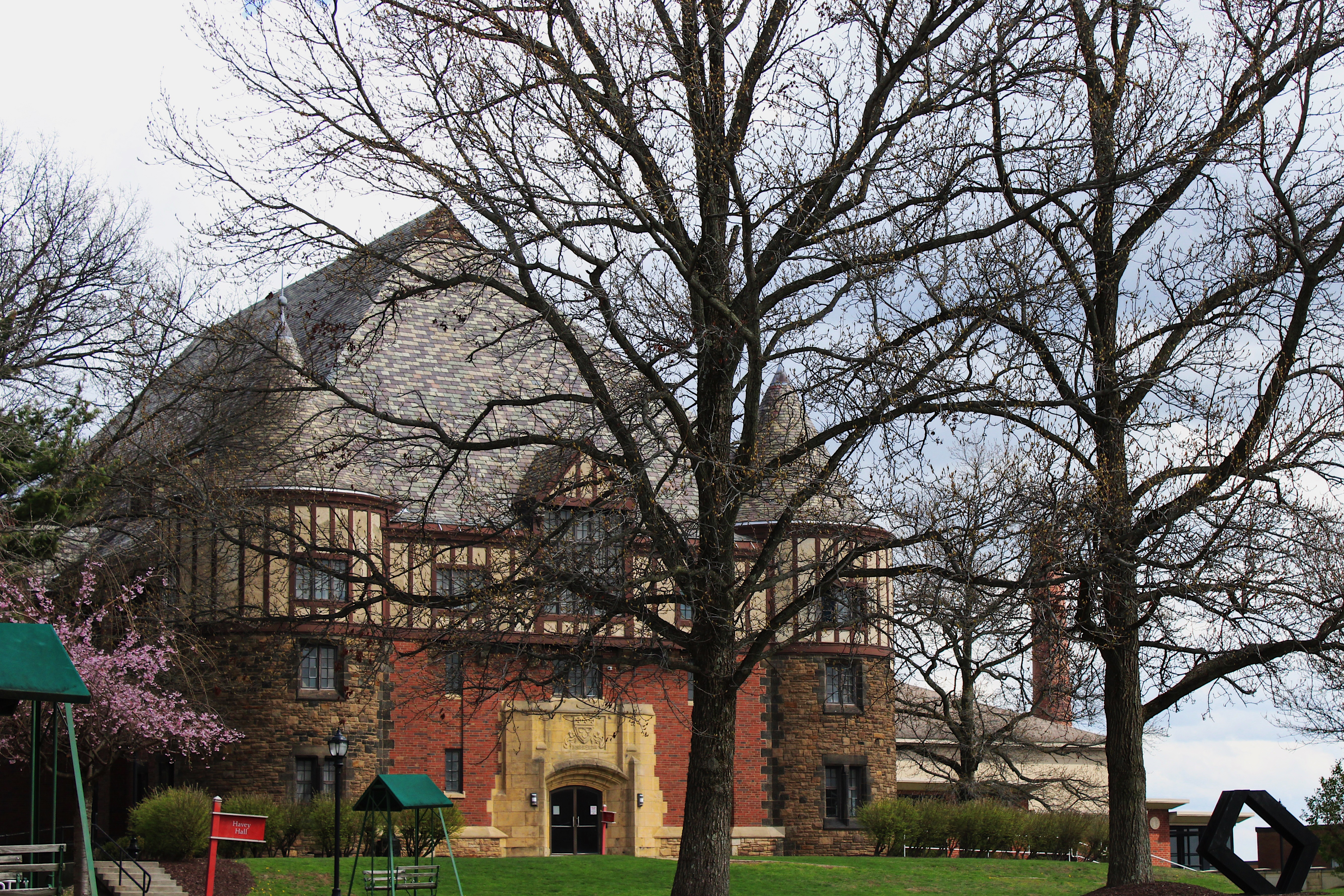
Harvey Hall

After president JoAnne Boyle formalized the school's new status as a university, the teams' nickname was changed from "Spirits" to "Griffins", and several men's athletics teams were added, including football. In 2006, Seton Hill announced it was transferring to NCAA Division II and joining the WVIAC as a provisional member (with full WVIAC competition in 2007–08). Prior to that, they had belonged to the NAIA and in the American Mideast.

As of July 1, 2013, following the breakup of the WVIAC, along with the University of Pittsburgh at Johnstown, also from the WVIAC, Seton Hill joined the PSAC.

In 2005, 60% of the entering class was male, due to an influx of male students who were interested in new sports programs such as football. In 2008, the football team had a 10–3 record. The football team and the men's soccer team each won the inaugural West Virginia Intercollegiate Athletic Conference's team sportsmanship award in 2008.

In 2006, the baseball team received a berth to the NAIA World Series in the program's third year of existence.

In 2014, the baseball team had its most successful season; winning the PSAC, the Atlantic Regional, and advancing to the College World Series. The team ended up finishing top six in the country.

In 2022, Seton Hill created their first Esports team. The team is co-ed and includes about 25 students.

In 2025, the school put the student newspaper, The Setonian, on an indefinite hiatus.

== Notable alumni ==
- Eileen DeSandre, actor
- Ronne Froman, Rear Admiral and Commander of Navy Region Southwest
- Patricia A. Gabow '65, CEO of Denver Health
- Hubertina D. Hogan '47, Army chemist
- Maureen O'Connor '73, first woman to serve as chief justice of the Ohio Supreme Court.
- Kameron Taylor, professional basketball player
- Stephanie M. Wytovich editor, novelist and poet
