= Mercyhurst Lakers football =

Intercollegiate American football team of Mercyhurst University

| 2026 Mercyhurst Lakers football team |
- First season: 1981; 45 years ago
- Head coach: Thomas Sydeski
- Location: Erie, Pennsylvania
- Stadium: Saxon Stadium (capacity: 2,300)
- NCAA division: Division I FCS
- Conference: NEC
- Colors: Forest green and navy blue
- All-time record: 213–236–4 (.475)

Conference championships
- PSAC: 2010
- Outfitter: Under Armour
- Website: Official website

The Mercyhurst Lakers football team represents Mercyhurst University in football. Mercyhurst is a member of the Northeast Conference (NEC).

The Lakers play in Saxon Stadium on the campus of Mercyhurst University in Erie, Pennsylvania, which has a seating capacity of 2,300.

== History ==
=== Classifications ===
- 1981–1992: NCAA Division III
- 1993–2023 NCAA Division II
- 2024–present: NCAA Division I FCS

=== Conference memberships ===
- 1981–1992: D-III Independent
- 1993–1997: D-II Independent
- 1998: Midwest Intercollegiate Football Conference
- 1999–2007: Great Lakes Intercollegiate Athletic Conference
- 2008–2023: Pennsylvania State Athletic Conference
- 2024–: Northeast Conference

== Head coaches ==
| Name | Seasons | Record | Win pct. |
| Tony DeMeo | 1981–1987 | 41–21–2 | 0.656 |
| Ken Brasington | 1988–1989 | 11–7 | 0.610 |
| Jim Chapman | 1990–1992 | 11–16–1 | 0.411 |
| Joe Kimball | 1993–2001 | 41–46–1 | 0.472 |
| Marty Schaetzle | 2002–2021 | 97–114 | 0.460 |
| Ryan Riemedio | 2022-2025 | 13–31 | 0.295 |
| Thomas Sydeski | 2026- | 0–0 | 0.000 |

== Playoffs ==
=== NCAA Division II ===
The Lakers appeared in the Division II playoffs one time, with an overall record of 1–1.

| Year | Round | Opponent | Result |
|---|---|---|---|
| 2010 | Second Round; Quarterfinals | Bloomsburg; Shepherd | W, 28–14; L, 14–49 |

== Future non-conference opponents ==
Announced schedules as of November 11, 2026.

| 2027 | 2028 | 2029 | 2030 |
|---|---|---|---|
| at Eastern Michigan | Youngstown State | at Akron | at Eastern Michigan |
| at Kent State | at San José State | | |
| at Utah State | | | |
| at Bowling Green | | | |
