= Lock Haven Bald Eagles football =

- First season: 1900; 126 years ago (Note: The team was founded in 1870; 156 years ago, but they played their first season in 1900.)
- Head coach: Joe Battaglia; 2nd season, 11–10 (.524)
- Location: Lock Haven, Pennsylvania
- Stadium: Hubert Jack Stadium (capacity: 3,500)
- Conference: Pennsylvania State Athletic Conference
- Division: East
- Colors: Crimson and white
- Website: golhu.com

The Lock Haven Bald Eagles football program is the intercollegiate American football team for Lock Haven University of Pennsylvania located in Lock Haven, Pennsylvania. The Bald Eagles play in the NCAA Division II and are members of the Pennsylvania State Athletic Conference.

== History ==
Lock Haven University of Pennsylvania was founded in 1870, and played their first football games in 1900, when the school was known as Central State Normal School. The team was very successful in the early 1930s, winning the "Pennsylvania State Teachers College football championship" in 1930, 1931, 1933, and 1936. They were founding members of the Pennsylvania State Athletic Conference, joining it in 1951, and won their first conference championship in 1957. They were coached that year by Hubert Jack, who their current stadium is named after. The school's most recent conference championship was in 1979, after compiling a 9–2 record and outscoring opponents 314–168. The team declined in the following years, and have compiled a record of 2–9 or worse in eight of their last ten seasons.

=== Classifications ===
- 1939–1972: NCAA College Division
- 1958–1969: NAIA
- 1970: NAIA Division II
- 1973–1979: NCAA Division III
- 1980–present: NCAA Division II

=== Conference memberships ===
- 1900–1933: Independent
- 1934–1950?: Pennsylvania State Teachers Conference
- 1951–present: Pennsylvania State Athletic Conference

== Alumni in the NFL ==
Lock Haven has had three alumni play in the National Football League (NFL): John Eisenhooth and Bret Shugarts as replacement players during the 1987 NFL strike, and Chris Collier in 2024.
