= Clarion Golden Eagles =

- University: PennWest Clarion
- Nickname: Golden Eagles
- NCAA: Division II (primary); Division I (wrestling)
- Conference: PSAC (primary); MAC (wrestling)
- Athletic director: Dr. Wendy Snodgrass
- Location: Clarion, Pennsylvania
- Varsity teams: 15 (6 men's, 9 women's)
- Football stadium: Memorial Stadium
- Basketball arena: Waldo S. Tippin Gymnasium
- Colors: Blue and gold
- Website: clariongoldeneagles.com

The Clarion Golden Eagles are the athletic teams that represent PennWest Clarion (known before July 2022 as Clarion University of Pennsylvania), located in Clarion, Pennsylvania, in NCAA Division II intercollegiate sports. The Golden Eagles are members of the Pennsylvania State Athletic Conference (PSAC) for 13 of 14 varsity sports; the wrestling team competes in the Mid-American Conference (MAC) as a member of the NCAA's Division I. The Golden Eagles have been a member of the PSAC since its foundation in 1951.

== History ==
Notable former Golden Eagles include Kurt Angle NCAA Division I Wrestling Champion and Olympic Wrestler; former UFC Champion Frankie Edgar who was a four-time NCAA Division I tournament qualifier; Reggie Wells, NFL offensive lineman; Cy Young winner Pete Vukovich; and Men's NCAA Division I Basketball Champion Coach at Kentucky John Calipari, a point guard for Clarion University from 1980-1982.

=== Conferences ===
- 1908–1950: Independent
- 1951–present: Pennsylvania State Athletic Conference

== Varsity teams ==
=== List of teams ===
Men's sports (6)

- Baseball
- Basketball
- Football
- Golf
- Swimming and diving
- Wrestling

Women's sports (9)

- Basketball
- Cross country
- Golf
- Soccer
- Softball
- Swimming and diving
- Tennis
- Track and field
- Volleyball

== National championships ==
=== Team ===
Association	Division	Sport	Year	Opponent/Runner-Up	Score
NCAA	Division II	Women's Swimming and Diving (3)	1984	UC Irvine	262–212
NCAA	Division II	Women's Swimming and Diving (3)	1984	UC Davis	285–227
NCAA	Division II	Women's Swimming and Diving (3)	1986	Cal State Northridge	428–283

== Individual sports ==
=== Football ===
Clarion has made one appearance in the NCAA Division II football playoffs; their record is 2–1.

Year	Round	Opponent	Result
1996	First Round; Quarterfinals; Semifinals	Bloomsburg; Ferris State; Northern Colorado	W, 42–29; W, 23–31; L, 18–19
Playoff Record			2–1

The team defeated the East Carolina Pirates in the 1952 Lions Bowl, 13–6.
