= 2012 Incarnate Word Cardinals football team =

American college football season

2012 Incarnate Word Cardinals football
- Conference: Lone Star Conference
- Record: 2–9 (1–7 Lone Star)
- Head coach: Larry Kennan (1st season)
- Offensive coordinator: Tony Marciano (3rd season)
- Offensive scheme: Multiple
- Defensive coordinator: Brian Gamble (1st season)
- Base defense: 3–4
- Home stadium: Gayle and Tom Benson Stadium

2012 Lone Star Conference football standings
	Conf.			Overall
Team	W		L	W		L
No. 16 Midwestern State +^	7	–	1	9	–	2
No. 4 West Texas A&M +^	7	–	1	12	–	3
Tarleton State	5	–	3	6	–	4
Texas A&M–Kingsville #	5	–	3	6	–	6
Abilene Christian	4	–	4	7	–	4
Angelo State	4	–	4	5	–	6
Eastern New Mexico †	2	–	6	3	–	7
Incarnate Word	1	–	7	2	–	9
Texas A&M–Commerce	1	–	7	1	–	9
+ – Conference co-champions; ^ – NCAA Division II playoff participant; # – Kanza Bowl participant † – Eastern New Mexico vacated all three wins; Rankings from AFCA poll

The 2012 Incarnate Word Cardinals football team represented the University of the Incarnate Word in the 2012 NCAA Division II football season. This was the Cardinals' final season in the Lone Star Conference as they began the transition to the Football Championship Subdivision (FCS) in 2013. Home games were played at Gayle and Tom Benson Stadium. They finished the season 2–9, 1–7 in Lone Star play to finish in a tie for eighth place.

== Schedule ==
Date	Time	Opponent	Site	Result	Attendance
September 1	7:00 p.m.	Texas College*	Gayle and Tom Benson Stadium; San Antonio, TX	W 19–12	4,522
September 8	6:00 p.m.	at No. 1 ^{(FCS)} Sam Houston State*	Bowers Stadium; Huntsville, TX	L 7–54	11,061
September 14	3:30 p.m.	vs. Eastern New Mexico	Cowboys Stadium; Arlington, TX	L 24–34	N/A
September 22	7:00 p.m.	No. 25 West Texas A&M	Gayle and Tom Benson Stadium; San Antonio, TX	L 0–24	4,755
September 29	7:00 p.m.	at No. 14 Midwestern State	Memorial Stadium; Wichita Falls, TX	L 7–34	6,742
October 6	7:00 p.m.	Texas A&M–Commerce	Gayle and Tom Benson Stadium; San Antonio, TX	W 31–9	2,200
October 13	7:00 p.m.	at Texas A&M–Kingsville	Javelina Stadium; Kingsville, TX	L 17–20	6,120
October 20	7:00 p.m.	McMurry*	Gayle and Tom Benson Stadium; San Antonio, TX	L 20–28	2,263
October 27	7:00 p.m.	Tarleton State^{†}	Gayle and Tom Benson Stadium; San Antonio, TX	L 20–45	2,069
November 3	2:00 p.m.	at Angelo State	San Angelo Stadium; San Angelo, TX	L 21–38	6,457
November 10	7:00 p.m.	Abilene Christian	Gayle and Tom Benson Stadium; San Antonio, TX	L 12–24	2,649
*Non-conference game; ^{†}Homecoming; Rankings from AFCA Poll released prior to the game; All times are in Central time

== TV and radio ==
All Incarnate Word games were broadcast on KKYX 680 AM with the voices of Gabe Farias and Shawn Morris. KKYX's broadcasts were available at their website. KUIW Radio produced a student media broadcast every week, that is available online, and they provided streaming of all non-televised home games were shown via UIW TV.
