= 2012 Angelo State Rams football team =

American college football season

2012 Angelo State Rams football
- Conference: Lone Star Conference
- Record: 5–6 (4–4 LSC)
- Head coach: Will Wagner (2nd season)
- Offensive coordinator: Theron Aych (1st season)
- Offensive scheme: Spread
- Defensive coordinator: Mike Walton (2nd season)
- Base defense: 3–4
- Home stadium: San Angelo Stadium

2012 Lone Star Conference football standings
	Conf.			Overall
Team	W		L	W		L
No. 16 Midwestern State +^	7	–	1	9	–	2
No. 4 West Texas A&M +^	7	–	1	12	–	3
Tarleton State	5	–	3	6	–	4
Texas A&M–Kingsville #	5	–	3	6	–	6
Abilene Christian	4	–	4	7	–	4
Angelo State	4	–	4	5	–	6
Eastern New Mexico †	2	–	6	3	–	7
Incarnate Word	1	–	7	2	–	9
Texas A&M–Commerce	1	–	7	1	–	9
+ – Conference co-champions; ^ – NCAA Division II playoff participant; # – Kanza Bowl participant † – Eastern New Mexico vacated all three wins; Rankings from AFCA poll

The 2012 Angelo State Rams football team represented Angelo State University in the 2012 NCAA Division II football season as a member of the Lone Star Conference.

== Schedule ==
Date	Time	Opponent	Site	Result	Attendance	Source
September 1	7:00 p.m.	Western State	San Angelo Stadium; San Angelo, TX	W 42–14	6,433	
September 8	2:00 p.m.	Chadron State	San Angelo Stadium; San Angelo, TX	L 7–19	6,202	
September 15	5:00 p.m.	vs. No. 18 Valdosta State	Cowboys Stadium; San Arlington, TX (LSC Football Festival)	L 10–43		
September 22	6:00 p.m.	No. 19 Abilene Christian	San Angelo Stadium; San Angelo, TX	W 28–23	7,320	
September 29	3:00 p.m.	at Eastern New Mexico	Greyhound Stadium; Portales, NM	W 49–19	3,127	
October 6	6:00 p.m.	No. 21 West Texas A&M	San Angelo Stadium; San Angelo, TX	L 9–35	4,822	
October 13	7:00 p.m.	at No. 13 Midwestern State	Memorial Stadium; Wichita Falls, TX	L 28–35	7,743	
October 20	4:00 p.m.	Texas A&M–Commerce^{†}	San Angelo Stadium; San Angelo, TX	W 17–16	6,345	
October 27	7:00 p.m.	at Texas A&M–Kingsville	Javelina Stadium; Kingsville, TX	L 21–34	9,065	
November 3	2:00 p.m.	Incarnate Word	San Angelo Stadium; San Angelo, TX	W 38–21	6,457	
November 10	7:00 p.m.	Tarleton State	Memorial Stadium; Stephenville, TX	L 27–54	6,348	
^{†}Homecoming; Rankings from AFCA Poll released prior to the game
