= 2012 Eastern New Mexico Greyhounds football team =

American college football season

2012 Eastern New Mexico Greyhounds football
- Conference: Lone Star Conference
- Record: 0–7, 3 wins vacated (0–6 LSC, 2 wins vacated)
- Head coach: Josh Lynn (1st season)
- Offensive coordinator: Kelley Lee (1st season)
- Offensive scheme: Gun option
- Base defense: 3–4
- Home stadium: Greyhound Stadium

2012 Lone Star Conference football standings
	Conf.			Overall
Team	W		L	W		L
No. 16 Midwestern State +^	7	–	1	9	–	2
No. 4 West Texas A&M +^	7	–	1	12	–	3
Tarleton State	5	–	3	6	–	4
Texas A&M–Kingsville #	5	–	3	6	–	6
Abilene Christian	4	–	4	7	–	4
Angelo State	4	–	4	5	–	6
Eastern New Mexico †	2	–	6	3	–	7
Incarnate Word	1	–	7	2	–	9
Texas A&M–Commerce	1	–	7	1	–	9
+ – Conference co-champions; ^ – NCAA Division II playoff participant; # – Kanza Bowl participant † – Eastern New Mexico vacated all three wins; Rankings from AFCA poll

The 2012 Eastern New Mexico Greyhounds football team represented Eastern New Mexico University in the 2012 NCAA Division II football season as a member of the Lone Star Conference (LSC). Led by first-year head coach Josh Lynn, the Greyhounds finished the season 3–7 overall with a conference mark of 2–6, placing seventh.

On September 1, 2015, it was announced that the program would have to vacate all of its win from 2008 to 2012 due to eligibility violations.

== Recruiting ==
Head coach Josh Lynn brought in 14 new recruits before the season started

College recruiting (2012)
Name	Hometown	School	Height	Weight	Commit date
Dustin Breeze; OL	Belen, New Mexico	Belen High School	6 ft 6 in (1.98 m)	310 lb (140 kg)	
Dustin Breeze; OL	Recruit ratings: No ratings found				
A. J. Canales; FS	El Paso, Texas	Canutillo High School	6 ft 2 in (1.88 m)	180 lb (82 kg)	
A. J. Canales; FS	Recruit ratings: No ratings found				
Jeremy Hathcock; OL	Aztec, New Mexico	Aztec High School	6 ft 2 in (1.88 m)	275 lb (125 kg)	
Jeremy Hathcock; OL	Recruit ratings: No ratings found				
Cody Jurek; OL	Gonzales, Texas	Gonzales High School	6 ft 3 in (1.91 m)	300 lb (140 kg)	
Cody Jurek; OL	Recruit ratings: No ratings found				
Idarious Ray; OL	Amarillo, Texas	Palo Duro High School	6 ft 6 in (1.98 m)	335 lb (152 kg)	
Idarious Ray; OL	Recruit ratings: No ratings found				
Jordan Wade; OL	Houston, Texas	Cy-Ridge High School	6 ft 3 in (1.91 m)	315 lb (143 kg)	
Jordan Wade; OL	Recruit ratings: No ratings found				
Michael Cowden; DT	Aztec, New Mexico	Aztec High School	6 ft 2 in (1.88 m)	335 lb (152 kg)	
Michael Cowden; DT	Recruit ratings: No ratings found				
Ricky Dickson; DL	Park Forest, Illinois	Rich East High School	6 ft 5 in (1.96 m)	280 lb (130 kg)	
Ricky Dickson; DL	Recruit ratings: No ratings found				
Jeremy Doucette; LB	Breaux Bridge, Louisiana	Cecilia High School	6 ft 1 in (1.85 m)	235 lb (107 kg)	
Jeremy Doucette; LB	Recruit ratings: No ratings found				
John Garcia; DB	Albuquerque, New Mexico	St. Pius X High School	5 ft 10 in (1.78 m)	180 lb (82 kg)	
John Garcia; DB	Recruit ratings: No ratings found				
Marcos Hinojos; DL	Plainview, Texas	Plainview High School	6 ft 1 in (1.85 m)	275 lb (125 kg)	
Marcos Hinojos; DL	Recruit ratings: No ratings found				
Landon Lock; LB	Gonzales, Texas	Gonzales High School	5 ft 11 in (1.80 m)	215 lb (98 kg)	
Landon Lock; LB	Recruit ratings: No ratings found				
Willie Riley; S	Amarillo, Texas	Palo Duro High School	5 ft 11 in (1.80 m)	175 lb (79 kg)	
Willie Riley; S	Recruit ratings: No ratings found				
Daniel Pena; DL	El Paso, Texas	El Paso-Austin High School	6 ft 3 in (1.91 m)	245 lb (111 kg)	
Daniel Pena; DL	Recruit ratings: No ratings found				
Overall recruit ranking:
Note: In many cases, Scout, Rivals, 247Sports, On3, and ESPN may conflict in their listings of height and weight.; In these cases, the average was taken. ESPN grades are on a 100-point scale.; Sources:

== Preseaon ==
Eastern New Mexico was picked to finish 8th in the 2012 LSC preseason poll.

== Schedule ==
Date	Time	Opponent	Site	Result	Attendance	Source
September 1	6:00 pm	at New Mexico Highlands*	Perkins Stadium; Las Vegas, NM	L 14–42	4,800	
September 8	2:00 pm	Sul Ross*	Greyhound Stadium; Portales, NM	W 38–35 (vacated)	4,127	
September 14	3:30 pm	vs. Incarnate Word	Cowboys Stadium; Arlington, TX (LSC Football Festival)	W 34–24 (vacated)	N/A	
September 22	7:00 pm	at Tarleton State	Memorial Stadium; Stephenville, TX	L 23–35	6,347	
September 29	3:00 pm	Angelo State^{†}	Greyhound Stadium; Portales, NM	L 19–49	3,127	
October 6	6:00 pm	at Abilene Christian	Shotwell Stadium; Abilene, TX	L 17–59	3,576	
October 20	6:00 pm	No. 17 West Texas A&M	Greyhound Stadium; Portales, NM (Wagon Wheel)	L 21–44	2,759	
October 27	7:00 pm	at No. 11 Midwestern State	Memorial Stadium; Wichita Falls, TX	L 28–51	3,129	
November 3	1:00 pm	Texas A&M–Commerce	Greyhound Stadium; Portales, NM	W 7–3 (vacated)	2,118	
November 10	7:00 pm	at Texas A&M–Kingsville	Javelina Stadium; Kingsville, TX	L 13–33	8,137	
*Non-conference game; ^{†}Homecoming; Rankings from American Football Coaches Association Poll released prior to the game; All times are in Mountain time

== Game summaries ==
=== At New Mexico Highlands ===
	1	2	3	4	Total
Greyhounds	0	14	0	0	14
Cowboys	0	7	14	21	42

Statistics	ENMU	NMHU
First downs	20	17
Total yards	248	345
Rushing yards	143	58
Passing yards	105	287
Turnovers	2	4
Time of possession	36:57	23:03

Team	Category	Player	Statistics
Eastern New Mexico	Passing	Wesley Wood	9/19, 77 yards
Eastern New Mexico	Rushing	Derek Kendall-Campbell	13 rushes, 56 yards, TD
Eastern New Mexico	Receiving	De'Coreyon Thomas	4 receptions, 55 yards
New Mexico Highlands	Passing	Taylor Genuser	24/37, 287 yards, 4 TD, 2 INT
New Mexico Highlands	Rushing	Keith Bellamy	7 rushes, 28 yards
New Mexico Highlands	Receiving	John Webster	7 receptions, 130 yards, TD

=== Sul Ross ===
	1	2	3	4	Total
Lobos	0	14	14	7	35
Greyhounds	7	10	0	21	38

Statistics	SRS	ENMU
First downs	19	29
Total yards	447	429
Rushing yards	270	301
Passing yards	177	128
Turnovers	1	0
Time of possession	27:16	32:44

Team	Category	Player	Statistics
Sul Ross Lobos	Passing	A. J. Springer	23/29, 177 yards, 4 TD
Sul Ross Lobos	Rushing	Dominique Carson	15 rushes, 146 yards, TD
Sul Ross Lobos	Receiving	Cordrick Mobley	8 receptions, 136 yards, 3 TD
Eastern New Mexico	Passing	Wesley Wood	13/15, 128 yards, TD
Eastern New Mexico	Rushing	Wesley Wood	23 rushes, 94 yards, 2 TD
Eastern New Mexico	Receiving	Chase Kyser	4 receptions, 54 yards, TD

=== Vs. Incarnate Word (LSC Football Festival) ===
	1	2	3	4	Total
Cardinals	14	0	7	3	24
Greyhounds	7	14	0	13	34

Statistics	UIW	ENMU
First downs	22	16
Total yards	449	373
Rushing yards	270	244
Passing yards	179	129
Turnovers	3	0
Time of possession	33:02	26:58

Team	Category	Player	Statistics
Incarnate Word	Passing	Zach Rhodes	17/30, 179 yards, 2 TD, 2 INT
Incarnate Word	Rushing	Zach Rhodes	8 rushes, 128 yards
Incarnate Word	Receiving	Dominic Hamilton	5 receptions, 69 yards, TD
Eastern New Mexico	Passing	Wesley Wood	7/12, 129 yards, TD
Eastern New Mexico	Rushing	De'Coreyon Thomas	16 rushes, 115 yards, TD
Eastern New Mexico	Receiving	Jacob Johnson	1 reception, 54 yards, TD

=== At Tarleton State ===
	1	2	3	4	Total
Greyhounds	0	10	7	6	23
Texans	0	21	0	14	35

Statistics	ENMU	TSU
First downs	18	30
Total yards	386	564
Rushing yards	139	324
Passing yards	247	240
Turnovers	0	2
Time of possession	29:28	30:32

Team	Category	Player	Statistics
Eastern New Mexico	Passing	Wesley Wood	10/20, 242 yards, 2 TD
Eastern New Mexico	Rushing	Christian Long	10 rushes, 55 yards
Eastern New Mexico	Receiving	Dillon Metzger	2 receptions, 131 yards, TD
Tarleton State	Passing	Aaron Doyle	19/34, 240 yards, 2 TD, 2 INT
Tarleton State	Rushing	Vaughn Smith	16 rushes, 167 yards, 2 TD
Tarleton State	Receiving	Clifton Rhodes III	10 receptions, 111 yards, TD

=== Angelo State ===
	1	2	3	4	Total
Rams	14	14	14	7	49
Greyhounds	3	3	13	0	19

Statistics	ASU	ENMU
First downs	21	17
Total yards	527	216
Rushing yards	157	137
Passing yards	370	79
Turnovers	1	1
Time of possession	26:41	33:19

Team	Category	Player	Statistics
Angelo State	Passing	Blake Hamblin	8/11, 175 yards, 2 TD
Angelo State	Rushing	Jermie Calhoun	20 rushes, 62 yards, TD
Angelo State	Receiving	C. J. Atkins	4 receptions, 160 yards, TD
Eastern New Mexico	Passing	Wesley Wood	10/14, 79 yards, TD, INT
Eastern New Mexico	Rushing	Wesley Wood	21 rushes, 79 yards
Eastern New Mexico	Receiving	Chase Kyser	2 receptions, 25 yards

=== At Abilene Christian ===
	1	2	3	4	Total
Greyhounds	7	3	0	7	17
Wildcats	14	17	21	7	59

Statistics	ENMU	ACU
First downs	20	24
Total yards	312	397
Rushing yards	244	136
Passing yards	68	261
Turnovers	4	1
Time of possession	34:56	25:04

Team	Category	Player	Statistics
Eastern New Mexico	Passing	Wesley Wood	9/19, 68 yards, 3 INT
Eastern New Mexico	Rushing	Wesley Wood	27 rushes, 128 yards, 2 TD
Eastern New Mexico	Receiving	Jacob Johnson	3 receptions, 32 yards
Abilene Christian	Passing	Mitchell Gale	18/28, 252 yards, 4 TD
Abilene Christian	Rushing	Marcel Threat	12 rushes, 70 yards, TD
Abilene Christian	Receiving	Taylor Gabriel	8 receptions, 112 yards

=== No. 17 West Texas A&M ===
	1	2	3	4	Total
Greyhounds	0	14	0	7	21
No. 17 Buffaloes	14	7	14	9	44

Statistics	WTAMU	ENMU
First downs	18	19
Total yards	454	391
Rushing yards	123	205
Passing yards	331	186
Turnovers	2	1
Time of possession	21:56	38:04

Team	Category	Player	Statistics
West Texas A&M	Passing	Dustin Vaughan	20/33, 321 yards, 2 TD, 2 INT
West Texas A&M	Rushing	Khiry Robinson	16 rushes, 131 yards, 4 TD
West Texas A&M	Receiving	Nathan Slaughter	7 receptions, 133 yards, TD
Eastern New Mexico	Passing	Wesley Wood	15/31, 188 yards, 2 TD
Eastern New Mexico	Rushing	Wesley Wood	15 rushes, 79 yards, TD
Eastern New Mexico	Receiving	Chase Kyser	7 receptions, 92 yards, 2 TD

=== At No. 11 Midwestern State ===
	1	2	3	4	Total
Greyhounds	0	14	7	7	28
No. 11 Mustangs	7	14	14	16	51

Statistics	ENMU	MSU
First downs	16	28
Total yards	353	516
Rushing yards	172	350
Passing yards	181	166
Turnovers	1	1
Time of possession	34:33	25:27

Team	Category	Player	Statistics
Eastern New Mexico	Passing	Wesley Wood	11/18, 181 yards, 3 TD
Eastern New Mexico	Rushing	Wesley Wood	26 rushes, 81 yards
Eastern New Mexico	Receiving	De'Coreyon Thomas	2 receptions, 73 yards
Midwestern State	Passing	Brandon Kelsey	10/13, 120 yards, 2 TD
Midwestern State	Rushing	Chauncey Harris	15 rushes, 157 yards, 2 TD
Midwestern State	Receiving	Mark Strange	2 receptions, 48 yards

=== Texas A&M–Commerce ===
	1	2	3	4	Total
Lions	3	0	0	0	3
Greyhounds	0	7	0	0	7

Statistics	TAMUC	ENMU
First downs	17	15
Total yards	275	283
Rushing yards	94	186
Passing yards	181	97
Turnovers	2	0
Time of possession	24:06	35:54

Team	Category	Player	Statistics
Texas A&M–Commerce	Passing	Kevin Vye	17/32, 181 yards, INT
Texas A&M–Commerce	Rushing	Jamar Mosley	11 rushes, 63 yards
Texas A&M–Commerce	Receiving	Garrett Smith	7 receptions, 91 yards
Eastern New Mexico	Passing	Wesley Wood	8/15, 87 yards, TD
Eastern New Mexico	Rushing	Christian Long	18 rushes, 81 yards
Eastern New Mexico	Receiving	Chase Kyser	4 receptions, 42 yards

=== At Texas A&M–Kingsville ===
	1	2	3	4	Total
Greyhounds	0	7	6	0	13
Javelinas	6	13	0	14	33

Statistics	ENMU	TAMUK
First downs	26	12
Total yards	353	362
Rushing yards	143	136
Passing yards	210	226
Turnovers	2	0
Time of possession	35:31	24:29

Team	Category	Player	Statistics
Eastern New Mexico	Passing	Wesley Wood	21/35, 210 yards, TD, INT
Eastern New Mexico	Rushing	Christian Long	12 rushes, 49 yards, TD
Eastern New Mexico	Receiving	Jacob Johnson	9 receptions, 120 yards
Texas A&M–Kingsville	Passing	Nate Poppell	14/24, 226 yards, 4 TD
Texas A&M–Kingsville	Rushing	Anthony Johnson	8 rushes, 85 yards
Texas A&M–Kingsville	Receiving	Robert Armstrong	6 receptions, 144 yards, 3 TD
