= 2012 West Texas A&M Buffaloes football team =

American college football season

2012 West Texas A&M Buffaloes football

LSC co-champion

NCAA Division II Semifinal, L 18–41 vs. Winston-Salem State
- Conference: Lone Star Conference

Ranking
- AFCA: No. 4
- Record: 12–3 (7–1 LSC)
- Head coach: Don Carthel (8th season)
- Offensive coordinator: Stephen Lee (2nd season)
- Offensive scheme: Air raid
- Defensive coordinator: Colby Carthel (7th season)
- Base defense: 3–4
- Home stadium: Kimbrough Memorial Stadium

2012 Lone Star Conference football standings
| | Conf. | | | Overall |
| Team | W | | L | W | | L |
|---|---|---|---|---|---|---|
| No. 16 Midwestern State +^ | 7 | – | 1 | 9 | – | 2 |
| No. 4 West Texas A&M +^ | 7 | – | 1 | 12 | – | 3 |
| Tarleton State | 5 | – | 3 | 6 | – | 4 |
| Texas A&M–Kingsville # | 5 | – | 3 | 6 | – | 6 |
| Abilene Christian | 4 | – | 4 | 7 | – | 4 |
| Angelo State | 4 | – | 4 | 5 | – | 6 |
| Eastern New Mexico † | 2 | – | 6 | 3 | – | 7 |
| Incarnate Word | 1 | – | 7 | 2 | – | 9 |
| Texas A&M–Commerce | 1 | – | 7 | 1 | – | 9 |
+ – Conference co-champions; ^ – NCAA Division II playoff participant; # – Kanza Bowl participant † – Eastern New Mexico vacated all three wins; Rankings from AFCA poll

The 2012 West Texas A&M Buffaloes football team represented West Texas A&M University in the 2012 NCAA Division II football season as a member of the Lone Star Conference. The Buffaloes ended the regular season with 9–2 record (7–1 in the LSC) which was enough to claim a share of the Lone Star Conference title and to qualify for the NCAA tournament as a six seed in region 4. West Texas A&M went on to win the NCAA Super Region Four Tournament but ended the season with a loss to Winston-Salem State in the National semi-final. With the 57–20 win over Western State on September 8, eighth-year head coach Don Carthel tied former head coach Joe Kerbel for the most wins in school history with 68, passing him a week later with a win over Texas A&M–Kingsville. The Buffaloes had multiple shutouts for first time since 2008.

West Texas A&M was ranked No. 24 the initial AFCA poll of the season.

== Dismissal of Don Carthel and NCAA investigation ==
This was Dan Carthel's final season as the Buffaloes head coach as he was fired by the university on August 22, 2013, two weeks before the first game of the 2013 season. According to the university's press release, Carthel misled university officials about buying tickets to a Texas Rangers game for two players on the football team and instructed the players to lie about who bought the tickets. The NCAA launched an investigation that lasted for almost two-and-a-half years; the investigation found other infractions, such as defensive coordinator Colby Carthel providing impermissible benefits to a student-athlete and an academic fraud violation that occurred during the 2014 season. As punishment, the program was placed on probation from March 23, 2016 to March 22, 2019, had to vacate four wins from the 2014 season, and was fined $5,000.

== Schedule ==
| Date | Time | Opponent | Rank | Site | TV | Result | Attendance |
|---|---|---|---|---|---|---|---|
| August 30 | 7:00 pm | at No. 6 CSU Pueblo* | No. 24 | DeRose ThunderBowl; Pueblo, CO | KCIT | L 34–44 | 6,457 |
| September 8 | 6:00 pm | Western State (CO)* | | Kimbrough Memorial; Canyon, TX | | W 57–20 | 8,432 |
| September 15 | 8:00 pm | vs. No. 14 Texas A&M–Kingsville | | Cowboys Stadium; Arlington, TX (LSC Football Festival) | KAMR | W 40–10 | 19,143 |
| September 22 | 7:00 pm | at Incarnate Word | No. 25 | Benson Stadium; San Antonio, TX | KAMR | W 24–0 | 4,755 |
| September 29 | 6:00 pm | Tarleton State | No. 23 | Kimbrough Memorial; Canyon, TX | | W 41–24 | 7,825 |
| October 6 | 6:00 pm | at Angelo State | No. 21 | San Angelo Stadium; San Angelo, TX | KCPN/KAMR | W 35–9 | 4,822 |
| October 13 | 6:00 pm | Abilene Christian^{†} | No. 20 | Kimbrough Memorial; Canyon, TX | FSSW.com | W 36–0 | 13,019 |
| October 20 | 6:00 pm | at Eastern New Mexico | No. 17 | Greyhound Stadium; Portales, NM (Wagon Wheel) | KAMR | W 44–21 | 2,759 |
| October 27 | 7:00 pm | at West Georgia* | No. 14 | University Stadium; Carrollton, GA (GSC–LSC First and Ten Challenge) | KAMR/CSSW | W 44–21 | 2,886 |
| November 3 | 6:00 pm | No. 10 Midwestern State | No. 12 | Kimbrough Memorial; Canyon, TX | | L 48–52 | 12,238 |
| November 10 | 2:00 pm | at Texas A&M–Commerce | No. 17 | Memorial Stadium; Commerce, TX (East Texas vs. West Texas) | KAMR | W 45–14 | 1,521 |
| November 17 | 2:00 pm | at No. 20 Chadron State* | No. 16 | Elliott Field; Chadron, NE (NCAA Division II First Round) | KCIT | W 38–30 | 1,490 |
| November 24 | 10:00 am | at No. 4 Ashland* | No. 16 | Jack Miller Stadium; Ashhland, OH (NCAA Division II Second Round) | KAMR | W 33–28 | 2,842 |
| December 1 | 5:30 pm | at No. 1 CSU Pueblo* | No. 16 | DeRose ThunderBowl; Pueblo, CO (NCAA Division II Quarterfinal) | KCIT | W 34–13 | 10,217 |
| December 8 | 5:30 pm | at No. 2 Winston-Salem State* | No. 16 | Bowman-Gray Stadium; Winston-Salem, NC (NCAA Division II Semifinal) | | L 18–41 | 8,612 |
*Non-conference game; ^{†}Homecoming; Rankings from AFCA Poll released prior to the game

== Rankings ==
Ranking movements Legend: ██ Increase in ranking ██ Decrease in ranking RV = Received votes
| | Week | | | | | | | | | | | | |
| Poll | Pre | 1 | 2 | 3 | 4 | 5 | 6 | 7 | 8 | 9 | 10 | 11 | Final |
|---|---|---|---|---|---|---|---|---|---|---|---|---|---|
| AFCA | 24 | RV | RV | 25 | 23 | 21 | 20 | 17 | 14 | 12 | 17 | 16 | 4 |

== Game summaries ==
=== At No. 6 CSU Pueblo ===
| | 1 | 2 | 3 | 4 | Total |
|---|---|---|---|---|---|
| No. 24 Buffaloes | 14 | 0 | 6 | 14 | 34 |
| No. 6 Thunderwolves | 14 | 10 | 6 | 14 | 44 |

| Statistics | WTAMU | CSUP |
|---|---|---|
| First downs | 25 | 27 |
| Total yards | 541 | 487 |
| Rushing yards | 75 | 265 |
| Passing yards | 466 | 222 |
| Turnovers | 2 | 1 |
| Time of possession | 25:45 | 34:15 |

| Team | Category | Player | Statistics |
|---|---|---|---|
| West Texas A&M | Passing | Dustin Vaughan | 30/47, 398 yards, 3 TD, INT |
| West Texas A&M | Rushing | Aaron Harris | 9 rushes, 28 yards, TD |
| West Texas A&M | Receiving | Torrence Allen | 9 receptions, 164 yards, TD |
| CSU Pueblo | Passing | Ross Dausin | 20/24, 222 yards, 2 TD |
| CSU Pueblo | Rushing | J. B. Matthews | 23 rushes, 153 yards, TD |
| CSU Pueblo | Receiving | J. B. Matthews | 4 receptions, 78 yards, TD |

=== Western State (CO) ===
| | 1 | 2 | 3 | 4 | Total |
|---|---|---|---|---|---|
| Mountaineers | 0 | 0 | 6 | 14 | 20 |
| Buffaloes | 21 | 13 | 14 | 9 | 57 |

| Statistics | WSCU | WTAMU |
|---|---|---|
| First downs | 16 | 29 |
| Total yards | 278 | 677 |
| Rushing yards | 65 | 170 |
| Passing yards | 213 | 507 |
| Turnovers | 2 | 0 |
| Time of possession | 30:38 | 29:22 |

| Team | Category | Player | Statistics |
|---|---|---|---|
| Western State | Passing | Brian Duboski | 15/30, 213 yards, 2 TD, INT |
| Western State | Rushing | Germaine Daniels | 19 rushes, 48 yards |
| Western State | Receiving | Lukas Adams | 4 receptions, 59 yards, 2 TD |
| West Texas A&M | Passing | Dustin Vaughan | 22/32, 409 yards, 5 TD |
| West Texas A&M | Rushing | Geremy Aldridge | 11 rushes, 102 yards |
| West Texas A&M | Receiving | Nate Slaughter | 6 receptions, 132 yards, TD |

=== Vs. No. 14 Texas A&M–Kingsville ===
| | 1 | 2 | 3 | 4 | Total |
|---|---|---|---|---|---|
| No. 14 Javelinas | 3 | 0 | 0 | 7 | 10 |
| Buffaloes | 7 | 3 | 14 | 16 | 40 |

| Statistics | TAMUK | WTAMU |
|---|---|---|
| First downs | 19 | 18 |
| Total yards | 285 | 368 |
| Rushing yards | 88 | 112 |
| Passing yards | 197 | 256 |
| Turnovers | 3 | 1 |
| Time of possession | 34:14 | 25:46 |

| Team | Category | Player | Statistics |
|---|---|---|---|
| Texas A&M–Kingsville | Passing | Nate Poppell | 19/32, 188 yards, TD, INT |
| Texas A&M–Kingsville | Rushing | Randall Toney | 10 rushes, 42 yards |
| Texas A&M–Kingsville | Receiving | Sherman Batiste | 6 receptions, 86 yards, TD |
| West Texas A&M | Passing | Dustin Vaughan | 19/29, 250 yards, 3 TD |
| West Texas A&M | Rushing | Khiry Robinson | 17 rushes, 110 yards, TD |
| West Texas A&M | Receiving | Lance Ratliff | 3 receptions, 76 yards, 2 TD |

=== At Incarnate Word ===
| | 1 | 2 | 3 | 4 | Total |
|---|---|---|---|---|---|
| No. 25 Buffaloes | 0 | 10 | 14 | 0 | 24 |
| Cardinals | 0 | 0 | 0 | 0 | 0 |

| Statistics | WTAMU | UIW |
|---|---|---|
| First downs | 18 | 10 |
| Total yards | 361 | 146 |
| Rushing yards | 105 | 15 |
| Passing yards | 256 | 131 |
| Turnovers | 3 | 1 |
| Time of possession | 24:43 | 35:17 |

| Team | Category | Player | Statistics |
|---|---|---|---|
| West Texas A&M | Passing | Dustin Vaughan | 19/32, 243 yards, 2 TD, INT |
| West Texas A&M | Rushing | Khiry Robinson | 13 rushes, 58 yards |
| West Texas A&M | Receiving | Torrence Allen | 9 receptions, 86 yards |
| Incarnate Word | Passing | Taylor Woods | 14/26, 123 yards, INT |
| Incarnate Word | Rushing | Trent Rios | 14 rushes, 66 yards |
| Incarnate Word | Receiving | Trent Rios | 6 receptions, 67 yards |

=== Tarleton State ===
| | 1 | 2 | 3 | 4 | Total |
|---|---|---|---|---|---|
| Texans | 7 | 0 | 14 | 0 | 21 |
| No. 23 Buffaloes | 7 | 17 | 10 | 7 | 41 |

| Statistics | TSU | WTAMU |
|---|---|---|
| First downs | 23 | 27 |
| Total yards | 389 | 502 |
| Rushing yards | 193 | 171 |
| Passing yards | 196 | 331 |
| Turnovers | 1 | 1 |
| Time of possession | 32:06 | 27:54 |

| Team | Category | Player | Statistics |
|---|---|---|---|
| Tarleton State | Passing | Aaron Doyle | 15/27, 196 yards, TD |
| Tarleton State | Rushing | Vaughn Smith | 24 rushes, 134 yards, TD |
| Tarleton State | Receiving | Arthur Buckingham | 4 receptions, 69 yards, TD |
| West Texas A&M | Passing | Dustin Vaughan | 23/37, 331 yards, 4 TD |
| West Texas A&M | Rushing | Khiry Robinson | 18 rushes, 125 yards |
| West Texas A&M | Receiving | Torrence Allen | 5 receptions, 104 yards, 2 TD |

=== At Angelo State ===
| | 1 | 2 | 3 | 4 | Total |
|---|---|---|---|---|---|
| No. 21 Buffaloes | 8 | 10 | 10 | 7 | 35 |
| Rams | 3 | 0 | 0 | 6 | 9 |

| Statistics | WTAMU | ASU |
|---|---|---|
| First downs | 17 | 23 |
| Total yards | 398 | 332 |
| Rushing yards | 154 | 49 |
| Passing yards | 244 | 283 |
| Turnovers | 2 | 3 |
| Time of possession | 29:23 | 30:37 |

| Team | Category | Player | Statistics |
|---|---|---|---|
| West Texas A&M | Passing | Dustin Vaughan | 17/32, 241 yards, 3 TD, INT |
| West Texas A&M | Rushing | Khiry Robinson | 17 rushes, 143 yards |
| West Texas A&M | Receiving | Alphonse Coleman | 3 receptions, 75 yards |
| Angelo State | Passing | Blake Hamblin | 23/50, 264 yards, TD, 2 INT |
| Angelo State | Rushing | Donovan Roberts | 7 rushes, 41 yards |
| Angelo State | Receiving | C. J. Akins | 7 receptions, 70 yards |

=== Abilene Christian ===
| | 1 | 2 | 3 | 4 | Total |
|---|---|---|---|---|---|
| Wildcats | 0 | 0 | 0 | 0 | 0 |
| No. 20 Buffaloes | 7 | 6 | 16 | 7 | 36 |

| Statistics | ACU | WTAMU |
|---|---|---|
| First downs | 15 | 26 |
| Total yards | 210 | 475 |
| Rushing yards | 3 | 92 |
| Passing yards | 207 | 383 |
| Turnovers | 2 | 0 |
| Time of possession | 28:59 | 31:01 |

| Team | Category | Player | Statistics |
|---|---|---|---|
| Abilene Christian | Passing | Mitchell Gale | 17/29, 207 yards, 2 INT |
| Abilene Christian | Rushing | Charcandrick West | 6 rushes, 17 yards |
| Abilene Christian | Receiving | Darian Hogg | 2 receptions, 75 yards |
| West Texas A&M | Passing | Dustin Vaughan | 32/46, 359 yards, 3 TD |
| West Texas A&M | Rushing | Khiry Robinson | 15 rushes, 102 yards, TD |
| West Texas A&M | Receiving | Jarrian Rhone | 9 receptions, 106 yards, TD |

=== At Eastern New Mexico ===
| | 1 | 2 | 3 | 4 | Total |
|---|---|---|---|---|---|
| No. 17 Buffaloes | 14 | 7 | 14 | 9 | 44 |
| Greyhounds | 0 | 14 | 0 | 7 | 21 |

| Statistics | WTAMU | ENMU |
|---|---|---|
| First downs | 18 | 19 |
| Total yards | 454 | 391 |
| Rushing yards | 123 | 205 |
| Passing yards | 331 | 186 |
| Turnovers | 2 | 1 |
| Time of possession | 21:56 | 38:04 |

| Team | Category | Player | Statistics |
|---|---|---|---|
| West Texas A&M | Passing | Dustin Vaughan | 20/33, 321 yards, 2 TD, 2 INT |
| West Texas A&M | Rushing | Khiry Robinson | 16 rushes, 131 yards, 4 TD |
| West Texas A&M | Receiving | Nate Slaughter | 7 receptions, 133 yards, TD |
| Eastern New Mexico | Passing | Wesley Wood | 15/31, 188 yards, 2 TD |
| Eastern New Mexico | Rushing | Wesley Wood | 15 rushes, 79 yards, TD |
| Eastern New Mexico | Receiving | Chase Kyser | 7 receptions, 92 yards, 2 TD |

=== At West Georgia ===
| | 1 | 2 | 3 | 4 | Total |
|---|---|---|---|---|---|
| No. 14 Buffaloes | 7 | 24 | 7 | 14 | 52 |
| Wolves | 14 | 0 | 14 | 0 | 28 |

| Statistics | WTAMU | UWG |
|---|---|---|
| First downs | 19 | 21 |
| Total yards | 463 | 267 |
| Rushing yards | 119 | 151 |
| Passing yards | 344 | 116 |
| Turnovers | 1 | 1 |
| Time of possession | 24:52 | 35:08 |

| Team | Category | Player | Statistics |
|---|---|---|---|
| West Texas A&M | Passing | Dustin Vaughan | 28/37, 331 yards, 5 TD |
| West Texas A&M | Rushing | Khiry Robinson | 15 rushes, 89 yards |
| West Texas A&M | Receiving | Torrence Allen | 4 receptions, 97 yards, TD |
| West Georgia | Passing | Dallas Dickey | 7/10, 112 yards, 2 TD |
| West Georgia | Rushing | David Bailey | 17 rushes, 70 yards, TD |
| West Georgia | Receiving | Joey Eliezer | 2 receptions, 45 yards, TD |

=== No. 10 Midwestern State ===
| | 1 | 2 | 3 | 4 | Total |
|---|---|---|---|---|---|
| No. 10 Mustangs | 14 | 14 | 3 | 21 | 52 |
| No. 12 Buffaloes | 10 | 21 | 10 | 7 | 48 |

| Statistics | MSU | WTAMU |
|---|---|---|
| First downs | 24 | 30 |
| Total yards | 565 | 525 |
| Rushing yards | 317 | 134 |
| Passing yards | 248 | 391 |
| Turnovers | 2 | 3 |
| Time of possession | 29:52 | 30:08 |

| Team | Category | Player | Statistics |
|---|---|---|---|
| Midwestern State | Passing | Brandon Kelsey | 14/22, 248 yards, TD |
| Midwestern State | Rushing | Keidrick Jackson | 20 rushes, 133 yards, 2 TD |
| Midwestern State | Receiving | Keivin Swanson | 6 receptions, 91 yards |
| West Texas A&M | Passing | Dustin Vaughan | 30/47, 391 yards, 3 TD, INT |
| West Texas A&M | Rushing | Khiry Robinson | 23 rushes, 147 yards, 3 TD |
| West Texas A&M | Receiving | Lance Ratliff | 11 receptions, 180 yards, TD |

=== At Texas A&M–Commerce ===
| | 1 | 2 | 3 | 4 | Total |
|---|---|---|---|---|---|
| No. 17 Buffaloes | 14 | 7 | 14 | 10 | 45 |
| Lions | 0 | 7 | 7 | 0 | 14 |

| Statistics | WTAMU | TAMUC |
|---|---|---|
| First downs | 28 | 16 |
| Total yards | 510 | 328 |
| Rushing yards | 199 | 111 |
| Passing yards | 311 | 217 |
| Turnovers | 1 | 1 |
| Time of possession | 27:35 | 32:25 |

| Team | Category | Player | Statistics |
|---|---|---|---|
| West Texas A&M | Passing | Dustin Vaughan | 20/29, 278 yards, 2 TD |
| West Texas A&M | Rushing | Khiry Robinson | 16 rushes, 110 yards, 2 TD |
| West Texas A&M | Receiving | Torrence Allen | 5 receptions, 113 yards, TD |
| Texas A&M–Commerce | Passing | Kevin Vye | 15/31, 217 yards |
| Texas A&M–Commerce | Rushing | Jamar Mosley | 12 rushes, 72 yards, TD |
| Texas A&M–Commerce | Receiving | Tyler Rawlings | 4 receptions, 81 yards |

=== At No. 20 Chadron State (NCAA Division II First Round) ===
| | 1 | 2 | 3 | 4 | Total |
|---|---|---|---|---|---|
| No. 16 Buffaloes | 0 | 17 | 7 | 14 | 38 |
| No. 20 Eagles | 14 | 0 | 6 | 10 | 30 |

| Statistics | WTAMU | CSC |
|---|---|---|
| First downs | 25 | 27 |
| Total yards | 580 | 455 |
| Rushing yards | 311 | 72 |
| Passing yards | 269 | 383 |
| Turnovers | 2 | 0 |
| Time of possession | 29:38 | 30:22 |

| Team | Category | Player | Statistics |
|---|---|---|---|
| West Texas A&M | Passing | Dustin Vaughan | 19/31, 269 yards, 2 TD, 2 INT |
| West Texas A&M | Rushing | Khiry Robinson | 30 rushes, 235 yards, 3 TD |
| West Texas A&M | Receiving | Torrence Allen | 7 receptions, 142 yards |
| Chadron State | Passing | John McLain | 32/49, 331 yards, 2 TD |
| Chadron State | Rushing | Michael Madkins | 11 rushes, 54 yards |
| Chadron State | Receiving | Nathan Ross | 8 receptions, 76 yards, TD |

=== At No. 4 Ashland (NCAA Division II Second Round) ===
| | 1 | 2 | 3 | 4 | Total |
|---|---|---|---|---|---|
| No. 16 Buffaloes | 10 | 9 | 14 | 0 | 33 |
| Eagles | 0 | 21 | 7 | 0 | 28 |

| Statistics | WTAMU | AU |
|---|---|---|
| First downs | 19 | 22 |
| Total yards | 451 | 366 |
| Rushing yards | 53 | 200 |
| Passing yards | 398 | 166 |
| Turnovers | 2 | 4 |
| Time of possession | 31:24 | 28:36 |

| Team | Category | Player | Statistics |
|---|---|---|---|
| West Texas A&M | Passing | Dustin Vaughan | 35/50, 398 yards, 4 TD, INT |
| West Texas A&M | Rushing | Khiry Robinson | 21 rushes, 58 yards |
| West Texas A&M | Receiving | Torrence Allen | 13 receptions, 185 yards, 3 TD |
| Ashland | Passing | Taylor Housewright | 20/34, 166 yards, 2 TD, 3 INT |
| Ashland | Rushing | Anthony Taylor | 22 rushes, 156 yards, TD |
| Ashland | Receiving | Logan Slavinski | 7 receptions, 43 yards |

=== At No. 1 CSU Pueblo (NCAA Division II Quarterfinal) ===
| | 1 | 2 | 3 | 4 | Total |
|---|---|---|---|---|---|
| No. 16 Buffaloes | 7 | 17 | 10 | 0 | 34 |
| No. 1 ThunderWolves | 0 | 3 | 3 | 7 | 13 |

| Statistics | WTAMU | CSUP |
|---|---|---|
| First downs | 24 | 17 |
| Total yards | 517 | 225 |
| Rushing yards | 193 | 32 |
| Passing yards | 324 | 193 |
| Turnovers | 2 | 2 |
| Time of possession | 31:09 | 28:51 |

| Team | Category | Player | Statistics |
|---|---|---|---|
| West Texas A&M | Passing | Dustin Vaughan | 24/38, 324 yards, 3 TD, INT |
| West Texas A&M | Rushing | Khiry Robinson | 26 rushes, 176 yards |
| West Texas A&M | Receiving | Nate Slaughter | 7 receptions, 170 yards, 2 TD |
| CSU Pueblo | Passing | Ross Dausin | 22/33, 193 yards, TD, INT |
| CSU Pueblo | Rushing | J. B. Matthews | 16 rushes, 75 yards |
| CSU Pueblo | Receiving | J. B. Matthews | 6 receptions, 58 yards |

=== At No. 2 Winston-Salem State (NCAA Division II Semifinal) ===
| | 1 | 2 | 3 | 4 | Total |
|---|---|---|---|---|---|
| No. 16 Buffaloes | 7 | 0 | 3 | 8 | 18 |
| No. 2 Rams | 6 | 14 | 7 | 14 | 41 |

| Statistics | WTAMU | WSSU |
|---|---|---|
| First downs | 19 | 28 |
| Total yards | 302 | 510 |
| Rushing yards | 133 | 261 |
| Passing yards | 169 | 249 |
| Turnovers | 2 | 0 |
| Time of possession | 27:02 | 32:58 |

| Team | Category | Player | Statistics |
|---|---|---|---|
| West Texas A&M | Passing | Dustin Vaughan | 21/35, 169 yards, TD, 2 INT |
| West Texas A&M | Rushing | Khiry Robinson | 20 rushes, 137 yards, TD |
| West Texas A&M | Receiving | Torrence Allen | 6 receptions, 74 yards |
| Winston-Salem State | Passing | Kameron Smith | 15/23, 233 yards, 2 TD |
| Winston-Salem State | Rushing | Maurice Lewis | 21 rushes, 118 yards, 2 TD |
| Winston-Salem State | Receiving | Jamal Williams | 5 receptions, 99 yards, TD |

== Personnel ==
2012 West Texas A&M Buffaloes football team roster
Players
Coaches
Offense

| Pos. | # | Name | Class |
|---|---|---|---|
| RB | 3 | Khiry Robinson | Sr |
| QB | 4 | Luke Halpin | Jr |
| RB | 5 | Aaron Harris | Jr |
| WR | 6 | Aarrhon Flores | Sr |
| WR | 7 | Sean Morris | Jr |
| WR | 8 | Nate Slaughter | Jr |
| QB | 10 | Dustin Vaughan | Jr |
| WR | 11 | Torrence Allen | Jr |
| QB | 12 | David Lehocky | So |
| WR | 14 | Jace Jackson | Jr |
| WR | 15 | Luke Russell | Jr |
| WR | 16 | Jeff Lavulo | Jr |
| WR | 17 | Lance Ratliff | Jr |
| QB | 29 | Preston Rabb | Fr |
| RB | 37 | Jullian Ward | Fr |
| FB | 39 | Aaron Hyman | So |
| RB | 42 | Calvin Burns | Fr |
| WR | 43 | Jarrian Rhone | Fr |
| RB | 44 | Blake Dean | Fr |
| RB | 45 | Geremy Alridge-Mitchell | Fr |
| OL | 55 | Aaron Mullane | Sr |
| OL | 59 | Austin Carson | Fr |
| OL | 60 | Josh Williams | Jr |
| OL | 62 | Chris Dobos | Fr |
| OL | 64 | Craig Watts | Jr |
| OL | 65 | Cody Kluge | Fr |
| OL | 67 | Manase Foketi | Sr |
| OL | 68 | Sergio Montejano | Fr |
| OL | 70 | Casey O'Conner | Sr |
| OL | 71 | Terrance Harris | Sr |
| OL | 72 | Juan Roman | Fr |
| OL | 73 | Marc Waller | Jr |
| OL | 74 | Emory Atterberry | Jr |
| OL | 75 | Larson Crume | Fr |
| OL | 76 | Stephan Dube | Jr |
| OL | 78 | Patrick Ward | Jr |
| OL | 79 | Justin Griego | Fr |
| WR | 80 | Alphonse Coleman | Sr |
| WR | 81 | Sidney Parket | Jr |
| WR | 82 | Trevor Hammargren | Jr |
| WR | 84 | Jacob Hancock | So |
| WR | 86 | Ryan Lenzy | Fr |
| WR | 87 | Andrew Kelley | Fr |
| WR | 88 | Dimitri Donald | Fr |
| WR | 89 | Lorenzo Mervin | So |

Defense

| Pos. | # | Name | Class |
|---|---|---|---|
| DB | 1 | Jordan Smith | Sr |
| DL | 2 | Tyrell Higgins | Sr |
| DB | 9 | Dwight Morrison | Jr |
| LB | 18 | Bryan Johnson | Jr |
| DB | 19 | John McSheffery | Jr |
| DB | 20 | Chris Ceazer | Fr |
| DB | 21 | Torian Oakley | So |
| DB | 22 | Curtis Slater | Jr |
| DB | 23 | Tarin Lee | Jr |
| DB | 24 | Mark Okoro | Sr |
| LB | 25 | LeBrandon Mosley | Jr |
| DB | 26 | Anthony Hayes | Fr |
| DB | 27 | Chris Metcalf | Jr |
| LB | 28 | Eric Finefeuiaki | Jr |
| LB | 30 | Victor Cuero | Jr |
| DB | 31 | Rickey White | So |
| LB | 32 | Taylor McCuller | Jr |
| DL | 33 | David Christmas | Jr |
| LB | 34 | Cameron Warren | Fr |
| LB | 35 | Christian McBride | Fr |
| DB | 36 | Kendrele Staten | Fr |
| DB | 38 | Ethan Morriss | Fr |
| LB | 40 | Chris Olson | Jr |
| LB | 46 | Kyle Voss | Jr |
| LB | 49 | Dionte Johnson | Fr |
| LB | 50 | Kevin McCluskey | Sr |
| LB | 51 | Nick Whitt | Jr |
| LB | 52 | Jamen Sisk | Fr |
| LB | 53 | Seth Culp | Fr |
| LB | 54 | Kyler Gregory | So |
| LB | 56 | Shane Sobnosky | So |
| DL | 57 | Zachary Miterko | Fr |
| DB | 85 | Ryan Baca | So |
| DL | 90 | Ethan Westbrooks | Jr |
| DL | 92 | Deone Bondurant | Jr |
| DL | 93 | Aaron Wampler | Sr |
| DL | 94 | Lawrence Lehauli | Jr |
| DL | 95 | Shane Pennix | Jr |
| DL | 96 | Joshua Hunt | Jr |
| DL | 97 | Randy George | Fr |
| DL | 98 | Ronald Gonzalez | Fr |
| DL | 99 | Jacob Laguna | Fr |

Special teams

| Pos. | # | Name | Class |
|---|---|---|---|
| P, K | 13 | Kevin Vanvoris | Jr |
| P, K | 41 | Sergio Castillo | Jr |
| DS | 58 | Josh Beal | Fr |

Head coach

- Don Carthel

Coordinators/assistant coaches

- Stephen Lee
  Offensive coordinator
- Colby Carthel
  Defensive coordinator
- Joel Hinton
  Wide receivers
- Nick Paremski
  Defensive backs
- Matt Storm
  Offensive line
- Caid Faske
  Defensive tackles

Legend

- (C) Team captain
- (S) Suspended
- (I) Ineligible
- Injured
- Redshirt

Roster
Last update: October 13, 2023

== TV and radio ==
West Texas A&M road games were brotcasted on KAMR-TV.
