= 2012 Tarleton State Texans football team =

American college football season

2012 Tarleton State Texans football
- Conference: Lone Star Conference
- Record: 6–4 (5–3 LSC)
- Head coach: Cary Fowler (3rd season)
- Offensive coordinator: Justin Carrigan (1st season)
- Offensive scheme: Spread
- Defensive coordinator: Henry Cofer (3rd season)
- Base defense: 3–4
- Home stadium: Memorial Stadium

2012 Lone Star Conference football standings
	Conf.			Overall
Team	W		L	W		L
No. 16 Midwestern State +^	7	–	1	9	–	2
No. 4 West Texas A&M +^	7	–	1	12	–	3
Tarleton State	5	–	3	6	–	4
Texas A&M–Kingsville #	5	–	3	6	–	6
Abilene Christian	4	–	4	7	–	4
Angelo State	4	–	4	5	–	6
Eastern New Mexico †	2	–	6	3	–	7
Incarnate Word	1	–	7	2	–	9
Texas A&M–Commerce	1	–	7	1	–	9
+ – Conference co-champions; ^ – NCAA Division II playoff participant; # – Kanza Bowl participant † – Eastern New Mexico vacated all three wins; Rankings from AFCA poll

The 2012 Tarleton State Texans football team represented Tarleton State University in the 2012 NCAA Division II football season as a member of the Lone Star Conference.

== Schedule ==
Date	Time	Opponent	Site	Result	Attendance	Source
September 8	7:00 p.m.	No. 4 Midwestern State	Memorial Stadium; Stephenville, TX	W 20–17	6,027	
September 15	4:00 p.m.	vs. No. 20 Abilene Christian	Cowboys Stadium; Arlington, TX	L 31–34	19,134	
September 22	7:00 p.m.	Eastern New Mexico	Memorial Stadium; Stephenville, TX	W 35–23	6,437	
September 29	6:00 p.m.	at No. 23 West Texas A&M	Kimbrough Memorial Stadium; Canyon, TX	L 21–41	7,825	
October 6	7:00 p.m.	Delta State*	Memorial Stadium; Stephenville, TX	L 35–38	2,218	
October 13	6:00 p.m.	at Texas A&M–Commerce	Memorial Stadium; Commerce, TX	W 10–43	2,105	
October 20	6:00 p.m.	Texas A&M–Kingsville^{†}	Memorial Stadium; Stephenville, TX	L 23–35	6,216	
October 27	7:00 p.m.	at Incarnate Word	Gayle and Tom Benson Stadium; San Antonio, TX	W 45–20	2,069	
November 3	3:00 p.m.	at North Alabama*	Braly Municipal Stadium; Florence, Ala	W 38–28	9,067	
November 10	7:00 p.m.	Angelo State	Memorial Stadium; Stephenville, TX	W 54–37	6,348	
*Non-conference game; ^{†}Homecoming; Rankings from AFCA Poll released prior to the game
