= 2012 Midwestern State Mustangs football team =

American college football season

2012 Midwestern State Mustangs football
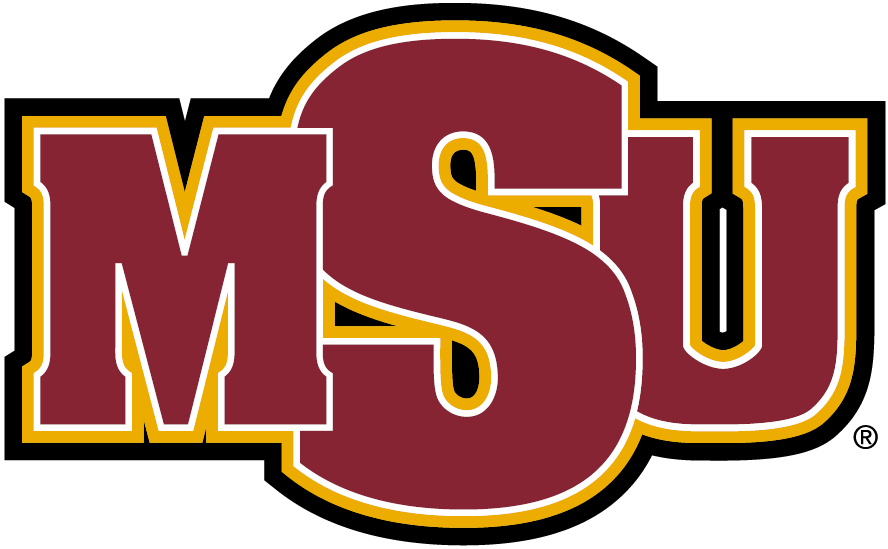

LSC co-champion

NCAA Division II First Round, L 14–31 at Indianapolis
- Conference: Lone Star Conference

Ranking
- AFCA: No. 16
- Record: 9–2 (8–1 LSC)
- Head coach: Bill Maskill (10th season)
- Offensive coordinator: Roderick Taylor (4th season)
- Offensive scheme: Multiple
- Defensive coordinator: Rich Renner (5th season)
- Base defense: 4–3
- Home stadium: Memorial Stadium

2012 Lone Star Conference football standings
	Conf.			Overall
Team	W		L	W		L
No. 16 Midwestern State +^	7	–	1	9	–	2
No. 4 West Texas A&M +^	7	–	1	12	–	3
Tarleton State	5	–	3	6	–	4
Texas A&M–Kingsville #	5	–	3	6	–	6
Abilene Christian	4	–	4	7	–	4
Angelo State	4	–	4	5	–	6
Eastern New Mexico †	2	–	6	3	–	7
Incarnate Word	1	–	7	2	–	9
Texas A&M–Commerce	1	–	7	1	–	9
+ – Conference co-champions; ^ – NCAA Division II playoff participant; # – Kanza Bowl participant † – Eastern New Mexico vacated all three wins; Rankings from AFCA poll

The 2012 Midwestern State Mustangs football team represented Midwestern State University in the 2012 NCAA Division II football season as a member of the Lone Star Conference.

== Schedule ==
Date	Time	Opponent	Rank	Site	Result	Attendance	Source
September 8	7:00 pm	at Tarleton State	No. 4	Memorial Stadium; Stephenville, TX	L 17–20	6,027	
September 13	7:06 pm	vs. Texas A&M–Commerce	No. 16	Cowboys Stadium; Arlington, TX	W 65–14	3,426	
September 22	7:05 pm	at Texas A&M–Kingsville	No. 15	Javelina Stadium; Kingsville, TX	W 45–28	8,136	
September 29	7:05 pm	Incarnate Word	No. 14	Memorial Stadium; Wichita Falls, TX	W 34–7	6,742	
October 4	6:35 pm	at No. 18 West Alabama*	No. 13	Tiger Stadium; Livingston, Ala	W 42–27	2,050	
October 13	7:00 pm	Angelo State	No. 13	Memorial Stadium; Wichita Falls, TX	W 35–28	7,743	
October 20	2:00 pm	at Abilene Christian	No. 13	Shotwell Stadium; Abilene, TX	W 35–31	7,212	
October 27	7:00 pm	Eastern New Mexico	No. 11	Memorial Stadium; Wichita Falls, TX	W 51–28	3,129	
November 3	6:00 pm	at No. 12 West Texas A&M	No. 10	Kimbrough Memorial; Canyon, TX	W 51–48	12,238	
November 10	1:00 pm	West Georgia*	No. 9	Memorial Stadium; Wichita Falls, TX	W 35–17	8,550	
November 17	12:00 pm	at No. 18 Indianapolis*	No. 8	Key Stadium; Indianapolis, IN (NCAA Division II First Round)	L 14–31	6,235	
*Non-conference game; Rankings from AFCA Poll released prior to the game

== Game summaries ==
=== At Tarleton State ===
	1	2	3	4	Total
No. 4 Mustangs	0	7	3	7	17
Texans	0	7	10	3	20

Statistics	MSU	TSU
First downs	21	23
Total yards	319	354
Rushing yards	146	217
Passing yards	173	137
Turnovers	3	1
Time of possession	26:16	33:44

Team	Category	Player	Statistics
Midwestern State	Passing	Brandon Kelsey	16/32, 173 yards, 2 INT
Midwestern State	Rushing	Brandon Kelsey	13 rushes, 71 yards, TD
Midwestern State	Receiving	Jared Freeman	4 receptions, 83 yards
Tarleton State	Passing	Aaron Doyle	18/26, 137 yards, INT
Tarleton State	Rushing	Jerome Regal	33 rushes, 152 yards, 2 TD
Tarleton State	Receiving	Clifton Rhodes III	4 receptions, 47 yards

=== Vs. Texas A&M–Commerce (LSC Football Festival) ===
	1	2	3	4	Total
Lions	0	0	14	0	14
No. 16 Mustangs	13	10	35	7	65

Statistics	TAMUC	MSU
First downs	13	24
Total yards	271	555
Rushing yards	89	376
Passing yards	182	179
Turnovers	7	1
Time of possession	30:10	29:50

Team	Category	Player	Statistics
Texas A&M–Commerce	Passing	Deric Davis	14/21, 129 yards, TD, INT
Texas A&M–Commerce	Rushing	Deric Davis	10 rushes, 49 yards, TD
Texas A&M–Commerce	Receiving	Garret Smith	5 receptions, 43 yards
Midwestern State	Passing	Brandon Kelsey	13/19, 154 yards, TD, INT
Midwestern State	Rushing	Chauncey Harris	4 rushes, 148 yards, 2 TD
Midwestern State	Receiving	Kendall Wren	3 receptions, 52 yards

=== At Texas A&M–Kingsville ===
	1	2	3	4	Total
No. 15 Mustangs	7	28	0	10	45
Javelinas	0	7	7	14	28

Statistics	MSU	TAMUK
First downs	24	28
Total yards	615	482
Rushing yards	421	58
Passing yards	194	424
Turnovers	1	2
Time of possession	29:52	30:08

Team	Category	Player	Statistics
Midwestern State	Passing	Brandon Kelsey	11/21, 194 yards, TD
Midwestern State	Rushing	Keidrick Jackson	18 rushes, 156 yards, 4 TD
Midwestern State	Receiving	Jared Freeman	4 receptions, 71 yards, TD
Texas A&M–Kingsville	Passing	Bryan Ehrlich	28/55, 415 yards, 3 TD, INT
Texas A&M–Kingsville	Rushing	Randall Toney	16 rushes, 39 yards
Texas A&M–Kingsville	Receiving	Sherman Batiste	8 receptions, 166 yards, 2 TD

=== Incarnate Word ===
	1	2	3	4	Total
Cardinals	7	0	0	0	7
No. 14 Mustangs	7	10	10	7	34

Statistics	UIW	MSU
First downs	17	21
Total yards	294	423
Rushing yards	148	260
Passing yards	146	163
Turnovers	2	2
Time of possession	33:17	26:43

Team	Category	Player	Statistics
Incarnate Word	Passing	Zach Rhodes	14/34, 100 yards, TD, INT
Incarnate Word	Rushing	Joseph Sadler	13 rushes, 68 yards
Incarnate Word	Receiving	Joseph Sadler	4 receptions, 47 yards
Midwestern State	Passing	Brandon Kelsey	11/20, 163 yards, TD, INT
Midwestern State	Rushing	Keidrick Jackson	24 rushes, 173 yards, 2 TD
Midwestern State	Receiving	Jared Freeman	5 receptions, 47 yards

=== At No. 18 West Alabama ===
	1	2	3	4	Total
No. 13 Mustangs	7	7	14	14	42
No. 18 Tigers	14	10	0	3	27

Statistics	MSU	UWA
First downs	23	19
Total yards	414	364
Rushing yards	348	188
Passing yards	66	176
Turnovers	2	1
Time of possession	27:03	32:57

Team	Category	Player	Statistics
Midwestern State	Passing	Brandon Kelsey	7/15, 66 yards
Midwestern State	Rushing	Keidrick Jackson	21 rushes, 193 yards, 3 TD
Midwestern State	Receiving	Joe Sanders	2 receptions, 24 yards
West Alabama	Passing	Gary Johnston	7/14, 106 yards, 2 TD
West Alabama	Rushing	Danny Hobbs	24 rushes, 109 yards, TD
West Alabama	Receiving	Marcus Brown	3 receptions, 74 yards, TD

=== Angelo State ===
	1	2	3	4	Total
Rams	3	10	8	7	28
No. 13 Mustangs	7	7	7	14	35

Statistics	ASU	MSU
First downs	20	21
Total yards	351	339
Rushing yards	168	280
Passing yards	183	59
Turnovers	1	3
Time of possession	32:45	27:15

Team	Category	Player	Statistics
Angelo State	Passing	Blake Hamblin	14/28, 183 yards, 3 TD, INT
Angelo State	Rushing	Blake Smith	13 rushes, 59 yards
Angelo State	Receiving	C. J. Akins	5 receptions, 90 yards, 2 TD
Midwestern State	Passing	Brandon Kelsey	6/16, 59 yards, TD, 2 INT
Midwestern State	Rushing	Brandon Kelsey	20 rushes, 153 yards, 2 TD
Midwestern State	Receiving	Keivin Swanson	3 receptions, 34 yards

=== At Abilene Christian ===
	1	2	3	4	Total
No. 13 Mustangs	14	0	14	7	35
Wildcats	14	3	7	7	31

Statistics	MSU	ACU
First downs	30	25
Total yards	510	427
Rushing yards	389	92
Passing yards	121	335
Turnovers	2	0
Time of possession	29:34	30:26

Team	Category	Player	Statistics
Midwestern State	Passing	Brandon Kelsey	12/16, 121 yards, INT
Midwestern State	Rushing	Keidrick Jackson	23 rushes, 197 yards, TD
Midwestern State	Receiving	Chauncey Harris	4 receptions, 57 yards
Abilene Christian	Passing	Mitchell Gale	26/38, 335 yards, 3 TD
Abilene Christian	Rushing	Charcandrick West	18 rushes, 63 yards, TD
Abilene Christian	Receiving	Taylor Gabriel	9 receptions, 116 yards, 2 TD

=== Eastern New Mexico ===
	1	2	3	4	Total
Greyhounds	0	14	7	7	28
No. 11 Mustangs	7	14	14	16	51

Statistics	ENMU	MSU
First downs	16	28
Total yards	353	516
Rushing yards	172	350
Passing yards	181	166
Turnovers	1	1
Time of possession	34:33	25:27

Team	Category	Player	Statistics
Eastern New Mexico	Passing	Wesley Wood	11/18, 181 yards, 3 TD
Eastern New Mexico	Rushing	Wesley Wood	26 rushes, 81 yards
Eastern New Mexico	Receiving	De'Coreyon Thomas	2 receptions, 73 yards
Midwestern State	Passing	Brandon Kelsey	10/13, 120 yards, 2 TD
Midwestern State	Rushing	Chauncey Harris	15 rushes, 157 yards, 2 TD
Midwestern State	Receiving	Mark Strange	2 receptions, 48 yards

=== At No. 12 West Texas A&M ===
	1	2	3	4	Total
No. 10 Mustangs	14	14	3	21	52
No. 12 Buffaloes	10	21	10	7	48

Statistics	MSU	WTAMU
First downs	24	30
Total yards	565	525
Rushing yards	317	134
Passing yards	248	391
Turnovers	2	3
Time of possession	29:52	30:08

Team	Category	Player	Statistics
Midwestern State	Passing	Brandon Kelsey	14/22, 248 yards, TD
Midwestern State	Rushing	Keidrick Jackson	20 rushes, 133 yards, 2 TD
Midwestern State	Receiving	Keivin Swanson	6 receptions, 91 yards
West Texas A&M	Passing	Dustin Vaughan	30/47, 391 yards, 3 TD, INT
West Texas A&M	Rushing	Khiry Robinson	23 rushes, 147 yards, 3 TD
West Texas A&M	Receiving	Lance Ratliff	11 receptions, 180 yards, TD

=== West Georgia ===
	1	2	3	4	Total
Wolves	0	3	7	7	17
No. 9 Mustangs	7	14	7	7	35

Statistics	UWG	MSU
First downs	21	28
Total yards	336	513
Rushing yards	187	470
Passing yards	149	43
Turnovers	1	2
Time of possession	32:31	27:29

Team	Category	Player	Statistics
West Georgia	Passing	Austin Trainor	15/32, 149 yards, INT
West Georgia	Rushing	Seth Hinsley	15 rushes, 86 yards, TD
West Georgia	Receiving	Bobby Burum	4 receptions, 48 yards
Midwestern State	Passing	Brandon Kelsey	4/11, 43 yards, INT
Midwestern State	Rushing	Chauncey Harris	16 rushes, 232 yards, 2 TD
Midwestern State	Receiving	Thomas Carper	1 reception, 15 yards

=== At No. 18 Indianapolis (NCAA Division II First Round) ===
	1	2	3	4	Total
No. 8 Mustangs	0	0	14	0	14
No. 18 Greyhounds	0	7	7	17	31

Statistics	MSU	IND
First downs	14	23
Total yards	280	338
Rushing yards	206	191
Passing yards	74	147
Turnovers	2	0
Time of possession	24:12	35:48

Team	Category	Player	Statistics
Midwestern State	Passing	Jake Glover	7/18, 56 yards, INT
Midwestern State	Rushing	Keidrick Jackson	16 rushes, 91 yards, 2 TD
Midwestern State	Receiving	Keivin Swanson	5 receptions, 39 yards
Indianapolis	Passing	Chris Mills	17/29, 147 yards
Indianapolis	Rushing	Matt Ripp	26 rushes, 143 yards, 2 TD
Indianapolis	Receiving	Mar'quone Edmonds	4 receptions, 42 yards
