= 2012 Texas A&M–Kingsville Javelinas football team =

American college football season

2012 Texas A&M–Kingsville Javelinas football

Kanza Bowl, L 38–45 vs. Emporia State
- Conference: Lone Star Conference
- Record: 6–6 (5–3 LSC)
- Head coach: Bo Atterberry (6th season)
- Defensive coordinator: David Calloway (6th season)
- Captains: Sherman Batiste; Zane Brown; Nate Poppell; Derek Tesch
- Home stadium: Javelina Stadium

2012 Lone Star Conference football standings
	Conf.			Overall
Team	W		L	W		L
No. 16 Midwestern State +^	7	–	1	9	–	2
No. 4 West Texas A&M +^	7	–	1	12	–	3
Tarleton State	5	–	3	6	–	4
Texas A&M–Kingsville #	5	–	3	6	–	6
Abilene Christian	4	–	4	7	–	4
Angelo State	4	–	4	5	–	6
Eastern New Mexico †	2	–	6	3	–	7
Incarnate Word	1	–	7	2	–	9
Texas A&M–Commerce	1	–	7	1	–	9
+ – Conference co-champions; ^ – NCAA Division II playoff participant; # – Kanza Bowl participant † – Eastern New Mexico vacated all three wins; Rankings from AFCA poll

The 2012 Texas A&M–Kingsville Javelinas football team represented Texas A&M University–Kingsville in the 2012 NCAA Division II football season as a member of the Lone Star Conference.

== Schedule ==
Date	Time	Opponent	Rank	Site	Result	Attendance	Source
September 1	7:00 p.m.	Central Washington*		Javelina Stadium; Kingsville, TX	W 35–7		
September 8	6:00 p.m.	at No. 9 Abilene Christian	No. 24	Shotwell Stadium; Abilene, TX	W 16–13	7,435	
September 15	8:00 p.m.	vs. West Texas A&M	No. 14	Cowboys Stadium; Arlington, TX	L 10–40	19,134	
September 22	7:00 p.m.	No. 15 Midwestern State		Javelina Stadium; Kingsville, TX	L 28-45	8,136	
September 29	6:00 p.m.	at Texas A&M–Commerce		Memorial Stadium; Commerce, TX	L 14–21 ^{OT}	924	
October 6	7:00 p.m.	North Alabama*		Javelina Stadium; Kingsville, TX	L 16–21		
October 13	7:00 p.m.	Incarnate Word		Javelina Stadium; Kingsville, TX	W 20–17	6,120	
October 20	6:00 p.m.	at Tarleton State		Tarleton Memorial; Stephenville, TX	W 35–23	6,216	
October 27	7:00 p.m.	Angelo State		Javelina Stadium; Kingsville, TX	W 34–21	9,065	
November 1	7:30 p.m.	at No. 24 Valdosta State*		Bazemore–Hyder Stadium; Valdosta, GA	L 31–38	3,711	
November 10	7:00 p.m.	Eastern New Mexico		Javelina Stadium; Kingsville, TX	W 33–13	8,137	
November 25	1:30 p.m.	No. 24 Emporia State*		Hummer Sports Park; Topeka, KS (Kanza Bowl)	L 38–45	4,300	
*Non-conference game; Rankings from AFCA Poll released prior to the game
