= 2012 NCAA Division II football season =

American college football season

- Total No. of teams: 167
- Regular season: September 1 – November 10, 2012
- Playoffs: November 17 – December 15, 2012
- National Championship: Braly Municipal Stadium; Florence, AL
- Champion: Valdosta State
- Harlon Hill Trophy: Zach Zulli, Shippensburg

The 2012 NCAA Division II football season, part of college football in the United States organized by the National Collegiate Athletic Association at the Division II level, began on September 1, 2012, and concluded with the NCAA Division II Football Championship on December 15, 2012 at Braly Municipal Stadium in Florence, Alabama, hosted by the University of North Alabama. The Valdosta State Blazers defeated the Winston-Salem State Rams, 35–7, to win their third Division II national title.

2012 was the final season for one of the division's oldest conferences, the West Virginia Intercollegiate Athletic Conference (WVIAC). Shortly before the start of the 2012–13 school year, the WVIAC's nine football-playing members announced plans to break away and form a new league. Before the new conference was announced, one of the nine breakaway schools (Seton Hill) chose instead to join the Pennsylvania State Athletic Conference; the remaining eight schools joined with three other football-playing schools and one non-football WVIAC member left out of the original split. The new league, officially unveiled in August 2012 as the Mountain East Conference, began play in 2013.

The Harlon Hill Trophy was awarded to Zach Zulli, quarterback from Shippensburg.

== Conference changes and new programs ==
- The Great Lakes Valley Conference began football play in 2012.

School	Former conference	New conference
Azusa Pacific	Independent (NAIA)	GNAC
Black Hills State	Independent	RMAC
Central Oklahoma	Independent	MIAA
Central State	Independent	GLVC
Indianapolis	GLIAC	GLVC
Kentucky Wesleyan	GLFC	GLVC
Lindenwood	Independent	MIAA
Malone	Independent (NAIA)	GLIAC
McKendree	Independent (NAIA)	GLVC
McMurry	American Southwest (D-III)	Independent
Minot State	Independent	NSIC
Missouri S&T	GLFC	GLVC
Nebraska–Kearney	RMAC	MIAA
Northeastern State	Independent	MIAA
Northwestern Oklahoma State	CSFL (NAIA)	Independent
Notre Dame (OH)	Independent	GLIAC
Quincy	MSFA (NAIA)	GLVC
Saint Joseph's	GLFC	GLVC
Shorter	Mid-South (NAIA)	Gulf South
Sioux Falls	Independent	NSIC
Southern Nazarene	CSFL (NAIA)	Independent
Southwest Baptist	Independent	MIAA
Urbana	GLFC	GLVC
Walsh	Independent (NAIA)	GLIAC
William Jewell	Independent	GLVC

Minot State, Notre Dame (OH), Simon Fraser, Sioux Falls, and William Jewell completed their transitions to Division II and became eligible for the postseason.

=== Regional realignment ===
The GNAC, MIAA, and Great American moved from Super Region 4 to Super Region 3, while the RMAC and GLIAC moved in the opposite direction; the GLVC, newly sponsoring football, was assigned to Super Region 4.

== Conference standings ==
=== Super Region 1 ===
2012 Central Intercollegiate Athletic Association football standings
	Conf.			Overall
Team	W		L	W		L
Northern
Elizabeth City State # xy	6	–	1	8	–	4
Chowan	5	–	2	6	–	4
Virginia Union	3	–	4	5	–	5
Virginia State	3	–	4	4	–	6
Bowie State	2	–	5	5	–	5
Lincoln (PA)	1	–	6	1	–	9
Southern
No. 2 Winston-Salem St. xy$^	7	–	0	14	–	1
Johnson C. Smith	5	–	2	6	–	4
St. Augustine's	4	–	3	6	–	4
Shaw	3	–	4	4	–	6
Livingstone	2	–	5	2	–	8
Fayetteville State	1	–	6	2	–	8
Championship: Winston-Salem State 34, Elizabeth City State 19
$ – Conference champion; x – Division champion/co-champions; y – Championship game participant; ^ – NCAA Division II playoff participant; # – Pioneer Bowl participant; Rankings from AFCA Poll

2012 Northeast-10 Conference football standings
	Conf.			Overall
Team	W		L	W		L
No. 8 New Haven y$^	8	–	0	10	–	1
American International y	7	–	1	7	–	3
Bentley	6	–	2	8	–	2
Stonehill	5	–	3	5	–	5
Merrimack	4	–	4	6	–	4
Assumption	3	–	5	3	–	7
Southern Connecticut	2	–	6	3	–	8
Saint Anselm	1	–	7	2	–	9
Pace	0	–	8	0	–	9
Championship: New Haven 37, American International 12
$ – Conference champion; y – Championship game participant; ^ – NCAA Division II playoff participant; Rankings from AFCA poll

2012 Pennsylvania State Athletic Conference football standings
	Conf.			Overall
Team	W		L	W		L
East
No. 14 Shippensburg xy^	7	–	0	11	–	2
No. 17 Bloomsburg ^	6	–	1	10	–	2
West Chester	4	–	3	7	–	4
East Stroudsburg	4	–	3	5	–	5
Kutztown	4	–	3	7	–	4
LIU Post	2	–	5	3	–	7
Millersville	1	–	6	2	–	9
Cheyney	0	–	7	1	–	10
West
No. 7 IUP xy$^	6	–	1	12	–	3
Mercyhurst x	6	–	1	9	–	2
California (PA)	5	–	2	8	–	3
Slippery Rock	5	–	2	6	–	5
Edinboro	3	–	4	4	–	6
Clarion	2	–	5	4	–	7
Gannon	1	–	6	3	–	8
Lock Haven	0	–	7	1	–	10
Championship: IUP 41, Shippensburg 10
$ – Conference champion; x – Division champion/co-champions; y – Championship game participant; ^ – NCAA Division II playoff participant; Rankings from AFCA poll

2012 West Virginia Intercollegiate Athletic Conference football standings
	Conf.			Overall
Team	W		L	W		L
No. 25 Shepherd $^	7	–	1	8	–	3
Charleston (WV)	6	–	2	9	–	2
Concord	6	–	2	7	–	4
Glenville State	6	–	2	6	–	5
West Liberty	4	–	4	6	–	5
Fairmont State	4	–	4	4	–	6
West Virginia Wesleyan	2	–	6	3	–	8
West Virginia State	1	–	7	2	–	9
Seton Hill	0	–	8	0	–	11
$ – Conference champion; ^ – NCAA Division II playoff participant; Rankings from AFCA Poll

=== Super Region 2 ===
2012 Gulf South Conference football standings
	Conf.			Overall
Team	W		L	W		L
No. 21 West Alabama $^	5	–	0	9	–	4
No. 1 Valdosta State ^	4	–	1	12	–	2
Shorter #	2	–	3	6	–	5
North Alabama	2	–	3	5	–	5
Delta State	1	–	4	3	–	7
West Georgia	1	–	4	3	–	7
$ – Conference champion; ^ – NCAA Division II playoff participant; # – Provisional NCAA Division II member; Rankings from AFCA Poll

2012 South Atlantic Conference football standings
	Conf.			Overall
Team	W		L	W		L
No. 20 Lenoir–Rhyne $^	6	–	1	9	–	3
No. 13 Carson–Newman ^	5	–	2	9	–	3
Mars Hill	5	–	2	6	–	4
Wingate	5	–	2	6	–	5
Newberry	3	–	4	5	–	6
Catawba	2	–	5	4	–	7
Brevard	1	–	6	2	–	9
Tusculum	1	–	6	2	–	9
$ – Conference champion; ^ – NCAA Division II playoff participant; Rankings from AFCA Poll

2012 Southern Intercollegiate Athletic Conference football standings
	Conf.			Overall
Team	W		L	W		L
East
Fort Valley State xy^	6	–	1	8	–	4
Albany State	5	–	2	6	–	4
Morehouse	2	–	5	3	–	7
Clark Atlanta	1	–	6	2	–	8
Benedict	1	–	6	1	–	9
West
No. 23 Tuskegee # xy$	7	–	0	10	–	2
Miles ^	6	–	1	8	–	2
Stillman	4	–	3	6	–	5
Lane	3	–	4	5	–	5
Kentucky State	0	–	7	2	–	8
Championship: Tuskegee 55, Fort Valley State 24
$ – Conference champion; x – Division champion/co-champions; y – Championship game participant; ^ – NCAA Division II playoff participant; # – Pioneer Bowl participant; Rankings from AFCA Poll

2012 NCAA Division II Super Region 2 independents football records
	Conf.			Overall
Team	W		L	W		L
UNC Pembroke		–		6	–	4
North Greenville		–		5	–	6
Rankings from AFCA Poll

=== Super Region 3 ===
2012 Great American Conference football standings
	Conf.			Overall
Team	W		L	W		L
No. 11 Henderson State $^	8	–	0	10	–	1
No. 19 Harding ^	7	–	1	9	–	2
Southern Arkansas #	5	–	3	7	–	4
Ouachita Baptis]	4	–	4	6	–	4
East Central	4	–	4	6	–	5
Arkansas Tech	3	–	5	5	–	6
SE Oklahoma State	2	–	6	4	–	6
SW Oklahoma State	2	–	6	3	–	7
Arkansas–Monticello	0	–	8	1	–	10
$ – Conference champion; ^ – NCAA Division II playoff participant; # – C.H.A.M.P.S. Heart of Texas Bowl participant; Rankings from AFCA poll

2012 Great Northwest Athletic Conference football standings
	Conf.			Overall
Team	W		L	W		L
Central Washington $	7	–	3	7	–	4
Humboldt State	6	–	4	7	–	4
Western Oregon	6	–	4	6	–	5
Simon Fraser	4	–	6	5	–	6
Azusa Pacific #	4	–	6	4	–	7
Dixie State	3	–	7	3	–	8
$ – Conference champion; # – Provisional Division II member; Rankings from AFCA Poll

2012 Mid-America Intercollegiate Athletics Association football standings
	Conf.			Overall
Team	W		L	W		L
No. 5 Missouri Western $^	9	–	1	12	–	2
No. 22 Emporia State #	9	–	2	10	–	2
No. 10 NW Missouri State ^	8	–	2	10	–	3
Pittsburg State	7	–	3	7	–	3
Lindenwood #*	7	–	3	8	–	4
Washburn	7	–	4	7	–	4
Central Missouri	6	–	4	6	–	4
Missouri Southern	5	–	5	6	–	5
Fort Hays State	4	–	6	5	–	6
Northeastern State	4	–	6	4	–	6
Truman	3	–	7	4	–	7
Southwest Baptist	3	–	8	3	–	8
Nebraska–Kearney	2	–	8	3	–	8
Central Oklahoma	2	–	8	2	–	8
Lincoln (MO)	1	–	10	1	–	10
$ – Conference champion; ^ – NCAA Division II playoff participant; # – bowl game participant (Emporia State: Kanza Bowl, Lindenwood: Mineral Water Bowl) * – provisional NCAA Division II member; Rankings from AFCA poll

2012 Northern Sun Intercollegiate Conference football standings
	Conf.			Overall
Team	W		L	W		L
North
No. 12 Minnesota–Duluth ^	10	–	1	10	–	2
Bemidji State	7	–	4	7	–	4
St. Cloud State	7	–	4	7	–	4
Northern State	6	–	5	6	–	5
Mary	4	–	7	4	–	7
Minot State	3	–	8	3	–	8
Minnesota–Crookston	2	–	9	2	–	9
MSU Moorhead	1	–	10	1	–	10
South
No. 3 Minnesota State $^	11	–	0	13	–	1
Winona State #	9	–	2	10	–	2
Sioux Falls	9	–	2	9	–	2
Wayne State (NE)	6	–	5	6	–	5
Augustana (SD)	5	–	6	5	–	6
SW Minnesota State	4	–	7	4	–	7
Concordia–St. Paul	2	–	9	2	–	9
Upper Iowa	2	–	9	2	–	9
$ – Conference champion; ^ – NCAA Division II playoff participant; # – Mineral Water Bowl participant; Rankings from AFCA Poll

=== Super Region 4 ===
2012 Great Lakes Intercollegiate Athletic Conference football standings
	Conf.			Overall
Team	W		L	W		L
North
Grand Valley State	7	–	3	8	–	3
Saginaw Valley State	7	–	3	8	–	3
Michigan Tech	7	–	3	7	–	3
Hillsdale	7	–	3	7	–	4
Ferris State	6	–	4	7	–	4
Wayne State (MI)	5	–	5	5	–	5
Northwood	4	–	6	5	–	6
Northern Michigan	4	–	6	5	–	6
South
No. 9 Ashland $^	10	–	0	11	–	1
Ohio Dominican	7	–	3	8	–	3
Findlay	7	–	3	7	–	3
Lake Erie	3	–	7	3	–	8
Notre Dame (OH)	2	–	8	3	–	8
Tiffin	2	–	8	3	–	8
Walsh *	2	–	8	3	–	8
Malone *	1	–	9	1	–	9
$ – Conference champion; ^ – NCAA Division II playoff participant; * – Provisional Division II member; Rankings from AFCA poll

2012 Great Lakes Valley Conference football standings
	Conf.			Overall
Team	W		L	W		L
No. 15 Indianapolis $^	8	–	0	10	–	3
No. 24 Missouri S&T	7	–	1	10	–	1
Urbana	5	–	3	7	–	4
Saint Joseph's (IN)	5	–	3	6	–	5
Quincy	4	–	4	4	–	7
McKendree #	3	–	5	3	–	7
William Jewell	2	–	6	3	–	8
Central State	2	–	6	2	–	9
Kentucky Wesleyan	0	–	8	2	–	9
$ – Conference champion; ^ – NCAA Division II playoff participant; # – Provisional Division II member; Rankings from AFCA Poll

2012 Lone Star Conference football standings
	Conf.			Overall
Team	W		L	W		L
No. 16 Midwestern State +^	7	–	1	9	–	2
No. 4 West Texas A&M +^	7	–	1	12	–	3
Tarleton State	5	–	3	6	–	4
Texas A&M–Kingsville #	5	–	3	6	–	6
Abilene Christian	4	–	4	7	–	4
Angelo State	4	–	4	5	–	6
Eastern New Mexico †	2	–	6	3	–	7
Incarnate Word	1	–	7	2	–	9
Texas A&M–Commerce	1	–	7	1	–	9
+ – Conference co-champions; ^ – NCAA Division II playoff participant; # – Kanza Bowl participant † – Eastern New Mexico vacated all three wins; Rankings from AFCA poll

2012 Rocky Mountain Athletic Conference football standings
	Conf.			Overall
Team	W		L	W		L
No. 6 CSU Pueblo $^	9	–	0	12	–	1
No. 18 Chadron State ^	8	–	1	9	–	3
New Mexico Highlands	7	–	2	8	–	3
Adams State	6	–	3	8	–	3
Colorado Mines	4	–	5	6	–	5
Colorado Mesa	4	–	5	4	–	7
Black Hills State #	3	–	6	4	–	7
Western New Mexico	3	–	6	4	–	7
Western State	1	–	8	1	–	10
Fort Lewis	0	–	9	0	–	10
$ – Conference champion; ^ – NCAA Division II playoff participant; # – Provisional Division II member; Rankings from AFCA Poll

2012 NCAA Division II Super Region 4 independents football records
	Conf.			Overall
Team	W		L	W		L
McMurry *#		–		8	–	3
Oklahoma Panhandle State		–		4	–	6
NW Oklahoma State *		–		3	–	7
South Dakota Mines *		–		2	–	9
Southern Nazarene *		–		2	–	9
# – C.H.A.M.P.S. Heart of Texas Bowl participant * – Provisional NCAA Division II member

=== Conference champions ===
Conference Champions

Central Intercollegiate Athletic Association – Winston-Salem State (14–1, 7–0)
Great American Conference – Henderson State
Great Lakes Intercollegiate Athletic Conference – Ashland
Great Lakes Valley Conference – Indianapolis
Great Northwest Athletic Conference – Central Washington
Gulf South Conference – West Alabama
Lone Star Conference – Midwestern State and West Texas A&M
Mid-America Intercollegiate Athletic Association – Missouri Western State
Northeast-10 Conference – New Haven
Northern Sun Intercollegiate Conference – Minnesota–Duluth (North) and Minnesota State–Mankato (South)
Pennsylvania State Athletic Conference – Indiana (PA)
Rocky Mountain Athletic Conference – CSU Pueblo
South Atlantic Conference – Lenoir-Rhyne
Southern Intercollegiate Athletic Conference – Tuskegee
West Virginia Intercollegiate Athletic Conference‡ – Shepherd

== Postseason ==
2012 NCAA Division II Football Championship
- Teams: 24
- Finals Site: Braly Municipal Stadium; Florence, AL
- Champion: Valdosta State; (3rd title, title game)
- Runner-up: Winston-Salem State; (1st title game)
- Semifinalists: West Texas A&M; Minnesota State–Mankato
- Winning coach: championship

The 2012 NCAA Division II Football Championship playoffs were the 39th single-elimination tournament to determine the national champion of men's NCAA Division II college football. The championship game was held at Braly Municipal Stadium in Florence, Alabama for the 25th time.

=== Seeded teams ===
- Ashland
- Carson–Newman
- CSU Pueblo
- Henderson State
- Minnesota State–Mankato
- New Haven
- Winston-Salem State
- Valdosta State

=== Playoff bracket ===
First Round; November 17; Campus Sites	Second Round; November 24; Campus Sites
*	Winston-Salem State	37
Shippensburg	14
*	Shippensburg	58
Bloomsburg	20
Super Region 1
*	New Haven	14
IUP	17
*	IUP	27
Shepherd	17
*	CSU Pueblo	28
Indianapolis	7
*	Indianapolis	31
Midwestern State	14
Super Region 4
*	Ashland	28
West Texas A&M	33
West Texas A&M	38
*	Chadron State	30
*	Valdosta State	49
West Alabama	21
*	West Alabama	41
Miles	7
Super Region 2
*	Carson–Newman	38
Lenoir–Rhyne	35
*	Lenoir–Rhyne	21
Fort Valley State	6
*	Minnesota State	38
Northwest Missouri State	35
*	NW Missouri State	35
Harding	0
Super Region 3
*	Henderson State	21
Missouri Western	45
*	Missouri Western †††	57
Minnesota–Duluth	55

Quarterfinals; December 1 Campus Sites
*	Winston-Salem State	21
IUP	17
*	CSU Pueblo	13
West Texas A&M	34
*	Valdosta State	48
Carson–Newman	26
*	Minnesota State	17
Missouri Western	10

Semifinals; December 8 Campus Sites
*	Winston-Salem State	41
West Texas A&M	18
Valdosta State	35
*	Minnesota State	19

National Championship Game; December 15; Braly Municipal Stadium; Florence, Alabama
Winston-Salem State	7
Valdosta State	35

* Home team † Overtime

== Awards and honors ==
=== Harlon Hill Trophy ===
The Harlon Hill Trophy is given to the year's most outstanding player.

Player	School	Position	1st	2nd	3rd	Total
Zach Zulli	Shippensburg	QB	52	14	18	202
Michael Hill	Missouri Western	RB	23	26	17	138
Franklyn Quiteh	Bloomsburg	RB	8	27	23	101
Dustin Vaughan	West Texas A&M	QB	10	14	10	68
Taylor Housewight	Ashland	QB	7	14	15	64

== See also ==
- 2013 NCAA Division I FBS football season
- 2013 NCAA Division I FCS football season
- 2013 NCAA Division III football season
- 2013 NAIA football season
