= Will Wagner (American football) =

American football player and coach

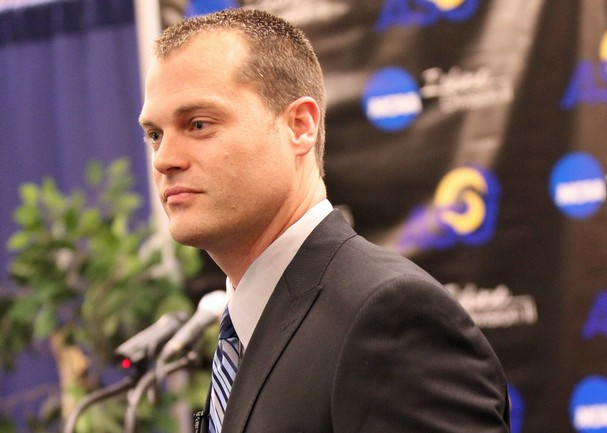
- Wagner at a press conference, 2011

Current position
- Title: Defensive line coach
- Team: Henderson State
- Conference: GAC

Playing career
- 1992–1995: Hardin–Simmons
- Position: Defensive back

Coaching career (HC unless noted)
- 1996–1997: Hardin–Simmons (GA)
- 1998–1999: Northwest Missouri (GA)
- 2000–2006: Northwest Missouri (DB)
- 2007–2010: Northwest Missouri (AHC)
- 2011–2018: Angelo State
- 2019: Abilene Christian (DA)
- 2020–2022: West Texas A&M (ST/LB/DB)
- 2023: Henderson State (ST/CB)
- 2024–present: Henderson State (DL)

Head coaching record
- Overall: 48–41
- Tournaments: 1–1 (NCAA D-II playoffs)

Will Wagner is an American college football coach and former player. He is the defensive line coach for Henderson State University, a position he has held since 2024. He served as the head football coach at the Angelo State University from 2011 until he was fired during the 2018 season. Wagner was hired as the seventh head football coach at Angelo State University on December 23, 2010. Prior to coming to Angelo State, he served as the defensive backs coach and assistant head coach at Northwest Missouri State University.

== High school and college ==
Wagner grew up in Odessa, Texas. He attended Permian High School, where as a defensive back and wide receiver he helped lead his team to win the state championship in 1991, his senior year. He went on to attend Hardin–Simmons University in Abilene, Texas, where he was a four-year starter, set the school record for interceptions in a season, set an American Southwest Conference record for career picks and earned All-American honors.

== Coaching career ==
After graduating with a degree in exercise science in 1996, Wagner stayed at Hardin–Simmons University and served as a graduate assistant for the 1997 season. Wagner then transferred to Northwest Missouri State to serve as a graduate assistant for Mel Tjeerdsma. He served as a graduate assistant for two years before being hired on as a defensive back coach in 2000. He was promoted to assistant head coach in 2006. While at Northwest Missouri coach Wagner helped oversee an incredibly successful team that had 15 consecutive winning seasons, 11 NCAA DII playoff appearances, 7 NCAA Division II National Championship Game appearances and 3 NCAA Division II National Championships during his tenure.

After the fall 2010 football season, Angelo State University fired previous head coach Dale Carr. After a national search, Wagner was named one of four finalists for the head coach position. On December 23, 2010, ASU athletic director Kathleen Brasfield announced the hiring of Wagner as the 6th head coach of the ASU Rams.

== Family ==
Wagner is married to Andrea Wagner. They have two sons and a daughter.

== Head coaching record ==
Year	Team	Overall	Conference	Standing	Bowl/playoffs	AFCA^{#}
Angelo State Rams (Lone Star Conference) (2011–2018)
2011	Angelo State	5–6	2–6	T–6th		
2012	Angelo State	5–6	4–4	T–5th		
2013	Angelo State	5–6	2–4	T–5th		
2014	Angelo State	9–3	5–2	T–2nd	L NCAA Division II Second Round	20
2015	Angelo State	7–4	3–3	T–3rd		
2016	Angelo State	5–6	4–5	7th		
2017	Angelo State	6–5	4–4	T–4th		
2018	Angelo State	6–5	4–4	T–4th		
Angelo State:		48–41	28–32			
Total:		48–41				
