= 2012 Abilene Christian Wildcats football team =

American college football season

2012 Abilene Christian Wildcats football
- Conference: Lone Star Conference
- Record: 7–4 (4–4 LSC)
- Head coach: Ken Collums (1st season)
- Offensive scheme: Spread
- Defensive coordinator: Darian Dulin (1st season)
- Base defense: 3–4
- Captains: Ryan Smith; Mitchell Gale; Reid Ware; L. B. Suggs
- Home stadium: Shotwell Stadium

2012 Lone Star Conference football standings
	Conf.			Overall
Team	W		L	W		L
No. 16 Midwestern State +^	7	–	1	9	–	2
No. 4 West Texas A&M +^	7	–	1	12	–	3
Tarleton State	5	–	3	6	–	4
Texas A&M–Kingsville #	5	–	3	6	–	6
Abilene Christian	4	–	4	7	–	4
Angelo State	4	–	4	5	–	6
Eastern New Mexico †	2	–	6	3	–	7
Incarnate Word	1	–	7	2	–	9
Texas A&M–Commerce	1	–	7	1	–	9
+ – Conference co-champions; ^ – NCAA Division II playoff participant; # – Kanza Bowl participant † – Eastern New Mexico vacated all three wins; Rankings from AFCA poll

The 2012 Abilene Christian Wildcats football team represented Abilene Christian University as a member of the Lone Star Conference (LSC) during the 2012 NCAA Division II football season. Led by first-year head coach Ken Collums, the Wildcats compiled an overall record of 7–4 with a mark of 4–4 in conference play, tying for fifth place in the LSC. The team played home games at Shotwell Stadium in Abilene, Texas.

Abilene Christian became just third program to have three consecutive 12,000-yard passers after Hawaii and Houston. The Wildcats had also the best punt returning in college football averaging 25.2 yards per return.

== Preseason ==
Abilene Christian was ranked No. 10 in the American Football Coaches' Association pre-season poll and No. 13 by Lindy's magazine. The ACU Wildcats were picked to finish 2nd in the conference behind Midwest State.

Mitchell Gale was not only awarded Lone Star Conference pre-season player of the year but also chosen pre-season NCAA DII offensive player of the year by Lindy's. Mitchell Gale and Morgan Lineberry (placekicker) were selected first team All-American and Taylor Gabriel (WR) made the third-team.

=== Transfers ===
Will Latu, offensive lineman, transferred from Oklahoma.

=== Recruiting ===
Abilene Christian signed 13 new players on national signing day

College recruiting information (2012)
Name	Hometown	School	Height	Weight	Commit date
Keith Barnett; CB	Converse, Texas	Converse Judson High School	6 ft 0 in (1.83 m)	180 lb (82 kg)	
Keith Barnett; CB	Recruit ratings: No ratings found				
Josh Bloom; DT	Kingwood, Texas	Kingwood Park High School	6 ft 1 in (1.85 m)	300 lb (140 kg)	
Josh Bloom; DT	Recruit ratings: No ratings found				
Tyler Chapa; CB	San Antonio, Texas	Warren High School	6 ft 1 in (1.85 m)	180 lb (82 kg)	
Tyler Chapa; CB	Recruit ratings: No ratings found				
Robbie Goldschmidt; LB	The Woodlands, Texas	The Woodlands High School	6 ft 0 in (1.83 m)	230 lb (100 kg)	
Robbie Goldschmidt; LB	Recruit ratings: No ratings found				
Chukwuma Oputa; LB	Dallas, Texas	Woodrow Wilson High School	5 ft 11 in (1.80 m)	230 lb (100 kg)	
Chukwuma Oputa; LB	Recruit ratings: No ratings found				
Parker McKenzie; QB	Spring Branch, Texas	Smithson Valley High School	5 ft 11 in (1.80 m)	175 lb (79 kg)	
Parker McKenzie; QB	Recruit ratings: No ratings found				
Chad Quisenberry; TE	Wolfforth, Texas	Frenship High School	6 ft 2 in (1.88 m)	235 lb (107 kg)	
Chad Quisenberry; TE	Recruit ratings: No ratings found				
Christian Rodriguez; OL	Los Fresnos, Texas	Los Fresnos High School	6 ft 5 in (1.96 m)	270 lb (120 kg)	
Christian Rodriguez; OL	Recruit ratings: No ratings found				
Cade Stone; QB	North Richland Hills, Texas	Fort Worth Christian High School	5 ft 11 in (1.80 m)	175 lb (79 kg)	
Cade Stone; QB	Recruit ratings: No ratings found				
Garrett Langthorp; OL	Conroe, Texas	Blinn College	6 ft 3 in (1.91 m)	290 lb (130 kg)	
Garrett Langthorp; OL	Recruit ratings: No ratings found				
Melvin Shead; DL	Cayuga, Texas	Kilgore College	6 ft 0 in (1.83 m)	290 lb (130 kg)	
Melvin Shead; DL	Recruit ratings: No ratings found				
Eric Frain; CB	Union, New Jersey	Los Angeles Pierce College	6 ft 2 in (1.88 m)	205 lb (93 kg)	
Eric Frain; CB	Recruit ratings: No ratings found				
Nick Finney; DL	Santa Fe Springs, California	Fullerton College	6 ft 0 in (1.83 m)	300 lb (140 kg)	
Nick Finney; DL	Recruit ratings: No ratings found				
Overall recruit ranking:
Note: In many cases, Scout, Rivals, 247Sports, On3, and ESPN may conflict in their listings of height and weight.; In these cases, the average was taken. ESPN grades are on a 100-point scale.; Sources:

== Schedule ==
Date	Time	Opponent	Rank	Site	TV	Result	Attendance	Source
September 1	6:00 p.m.	McMurry*	No. 10	Shotwell Stadium; Abilene, TX		W 51–0	11,337	
September 7	6:00 p.m.	No. 24 Texas A&M–Kingsville	No. 9	Shotwell Stadium; Abilene, TX (Action Sports Champions Classic)	KRBC-TV	L 13–16	7,435	
September 15	4:00 p.m.	vs. Tarleton State	No. 20	AT&T Stadium; Arlington, TX		W 34–31	19,134	
September 22	6:00 p.m.	at Angelo State	No. 19	San Angelo Stadium; San Angelo, TX		L 23–28	7,320	
September 27	6:36 p.m.	at Delta State*		McCool Stadium; Cleveland, MS		W 34–28	5,123	
October 6	6:00 p.m.	Eastern New Mexico		Shotwell Stadium; Abilene, TX		W 59–17	3,576	
October 13	6:00 p.m.	at No. 20 West Texas A&M		Kimbrough Memorial Stadium; Canyon, TX	FoxSportsSouthwest.com	L 0–36	13,019	
October 20	2:00 p.m.	No. 12 Midwestern State^{†}		Shotwell Stadium; Abilene, TX		L 31–35	7,212	
October 27	2:00 p.m.	at Texas A&M–Commerce		Memorial Stadium; Commerce, TX		W 24–17	5,224	
November 3	12:00 p.m.	No. 13 West Alabama*		Shotwell Stadium; Abilene, TX		W 22–16	3,517	
November 10	7:00 p.m.	at Incarnate Word		Gayle and Tom Benson Stadium; San Antonio, TX		W 24–12	2,649	
*Non-conference game; ^{†}Homecoming; Rankings from AFCA Poll released prior to the game

== Game summaries ==
=== McMurry ===
McMurry at Abilene Christian

Team	1	2	3	4	Total
War Hawks	0	0	0	0	0
• Wildcats	0	21	23	7	51

- Date: September 1
- Location: Shotwell Stadium
  Abilene, TX
- Game start: 6:00 p.m.
- Elapsed time: 2:57
- Game attendance: 11,337
- Game weather: 96 °F (36 °C), Wind: SSE 10mph, Sunny
- Referee: Andy Dunkin; Darrell Boyd (Umpire); Joe Stahmer(Linesman); Carlos Owens (Line judge); Jerry Bissett (Back judge); M. Rodriguez (Field judge); Michael Graham (Side judge); Chris Macaluso (Scorer)

Scoring summary
2	7:20	ACU	Charcandrick West 13 yd run (Morgan Lineberry kick) )	ACU 7–0
2	2:30	ACU	Travis Tarver II 2 yd run (Morgan Lineberry kick)	ACU 14–0
2	0:48	ACU	Taylor Gabriel 9 yd pass from Mitchell Gale (Morgan Lineberry kick)	ACU 21–0
3	8:30	ACU	Morgan Lineberry 25 yd field goal	ACU 24–0
3	6:42	ACU	Taylor Gabriel 7 yd run (Morgan Lineberry kick)	ACU 31–0
3	1:55	ACU	Marcel Threat 8 yd run (Morgan Lineberry kick failed)	ACU 37–0
3	0:35	ACU	Travis Tarver II 5 yd run (Morgan Lineberry kick)	ACU 44–0
4	8:44	ACU	Marcel Threat 12 yd run (Morgan Lineberry kick)	ACU 51–0

In the season, opener Abilene Christian played the NCAA Division II-newcomer and crosstown-rival McMurry Warhawks. It was the first game as head coach for Ken Collums. The wildcats enter the season ranked No. 10 ranked team while McMurry had one of the best offenses in NCAA Division III the previous season.

Defensive end Nick Richardson tied the school record with six sacks in Abilene Christian's first shutout since 2006.

Mitchell Gale completed 19 out of 28 passes for 290 yards and one touchdown. Marcel Threat ran for 88 yards on 14 carries, averaging 6.3 yards per carries, and scored two touchdowns. Taylor Gabriel caught seven passes for 108 yards and one touchdown.

Stats

Statistics	ACU	MCMURRY
Points	51	0
Total Plays	68	90
First downs	27	21
First downs from Rushing	11	2
First downs from Passing	13	15
First downs from Penalties	3	4
Total yards	461	301
Rushing yards	165	29
Passing yards	296	289
Rushing plays	39	29
Passing plays	29	61
Passing: Comp–Att–Int	20-29-1	38-61-1
Time of possession	30:12	29:48
Average Punt	32	28.3
3rd down conversion	5/10 (50%)	3/19 (16%)
4th down conversion	2/11 (18%)	0/0
Sacks	10	1
Red zone	0-2	8-8

Team	Category	Player	Statistics
Abilene Christian	Passing	Mitchell Gale	19/28, 290 yards, 1 TD
Abilene Christian	Rushing	Marcel Threat	14 carries, 88 yards, 2 TD
Abilene Christian	Receiving	Taylor Gabriel	7 receptions, 108 yards, 1 TD
McMurry	Passing	Jake Mullin	37/59, 288 yards, 0 TD
McMurry	Rushing	Chris Simpson	8 carries, 35 yards, 0 TD
McMurry	Receiving	Eric Shaffer	7 receptions, 55 yards

=== Texas A&M–Kingsville ===
Texas A&M–Kingsville at Abilene Christian

Team	1	2	3	4	Total
• Javelinas	0	10	3	3	16
Wildcats	6	0	0	7	13

- Date: September 8
- Location: Shotwell Stadium
  Abilene, TX
- Game start: 6:00 p.m.
- Elapsed time: 3:13
- Game attendance: 7,435
- Game weather: 84 °F (29 °C), Wind: NNE 14mph, Mostly Sunny
- Referee: Dwayne McKee; Stephen Borgman (Umpire); Brad Morrow (Linesman); Edgar Reed (Line judge); Keith Schoby (Back judge); Charles Colston (Field judge); Cory Hord (Side judge); Chris Macaluso (Scorer)
- Television network: KRBC-TV

Scoring summary
1	0:00	ACU	Taylor Gabriel 7 yd run (Morgan Lineberry kick failed)	ACU 6–0
2	9:31	TAMUK	R. Armstrong 22 yd pass from Nate Poppell (Matt Stoll kick)	TAMUK 7–6
2	1:09	TAMUK	Matt Stoll 35 yd field goal	TAMUK 10–6
3	7:06	TAMUK	Matt Stoll 29 yd field goal	TAMUK 13–6
4	14:57	TAMUK	Matt Stoll 31 yd field goal	TAMUK 16–6
4	14:45	ACU	Darr. Cantu-Harkless 65 yd run (Morgan Lineberry kick)	TAMUK 16–13

Both team enter the game ranked, ACU 9th and Texas A&M-Kingsville 24th, and with 1–0 record. ACU had won 8 straight against Javelinas. The Wildcats were without starting outside linebacker Chris Summers who suffered a right knee injury against McMurry and was out for the season.

Mitchell Gale arguably had his worst game in his college career with only 13 completed passes out of 31 for only 137 yards and his 23-game streak with a least one touchdown throw was snapped. A touchdown and three field goals was enough for Texas A&M-Kingsville to come away from Shotwell Stadium with a victory. This was the first time the Wildcats lost a home game in the regular season since 2009.

Darr. Cantu-Harkless rann for 70 yards in only 4 carries while catching 4 passes for 36 yards.

=== Tarleton State ===
Tarleton State vs Abilene Christian

Team	1	2	3	4	Total
Texans	14	6	0	11	31
• Wildcats	7	3	14	10	34

- Date: September 15
- Location: Cowboys Stadium
  Arlington, TX
- Game start: 4:00 p.m.
- Elapsed time: 3:03
- Game attendance: 19,134
- Game weather: 72 °F (22 °C), Wind: None, Indoors
- Referee: Dan Rankin; Erick Chapman (Umpire); Brad Morrow (Linesman); Eric Camouche (Line judge); Matt Horn (Back judge); Rory Bernard (Field judge); Jesse Mendoza (Side judge); Daniel Young (Scorer)

Scoring summary
1	08:37	ACU	Charcandrick West 1 yd run (Morgan Lineberry kick)	ACU 7–0
1	05:26	TARLETON	Jerome Regal 16 yd pass from Aaron Doyle (Blake Barnes kick)	7–7
1	00:27	TARLETON	Vaughn Smith 10 yd pass from Aaron Doyle (Blake Barnes kick)	TARLETON 14–7
2	12:17	TARLETON	Blake Barnes 28 yd field goal	TARLETON 17-7
2	04:24	TARLETON	Blake Barnes 41 yd field goal	TARLETON 20–7
2	01:53	ACU	Morgan Lineberry 27 yd field goal	TARLETON 20–10
3	08:29	ACU	Travis Tarver II 7 yd run (Morgan Lineberry kick)	TARLETON 20–17
3	04:03	ACU	Taylor Gabriel 6 yd pass from Mitchell Gale (Morgan Lineberry kick)	ACU 24–20
4	12:00	ACU	Morgan Lineberry 30 yd field goal	ACU 27–20
4	09:35	TARLETON	Blake Barnes 25 yd field goal	ACU 27–23
4	03:12	ACU	Taylor Gabriel 16 yd pass from Mitchell Gale (Morgan Lineberry kick)	ACU 34–23
4	01:02	TARLETON	Aaron Doyle 1 yd run (Will McLane pass from A. Doyle)	ACU 34–31

ACU had won six of the last eight meetings between the teams. The Wildcats enter the game 0–1 in the conference and 1-1 overall while Tarleton was still unbeaten after a win on opening day against Midwest State.

Despite being down 10 at half, the Wildcats clawed themselves back into the game and were able to take the lead late in the third quarter thanks to some great puntreturns and kept it for the rest of the game. ACU became only fourth team from the state of Texas to have won both in the Cowboys Stadium and the Cotton bowl. ACU and Gale have the most passing yards of any college teams and players in the Cowboys Stadium and Taylor Gabriel is the leading college wide receiver in the stadium in points (24).

Mitchell Gale was 27 out of 42 for 279 yards and 2 touchdowns. Mitchell Gale rushed for 38 yards in 11 carries and Darian Hogg did catch 8 balls for 67 yards.

=== Angelo State ===
Abilene Christian at Angelo State

Team	1	2	3	4	Total
Wildcats	9	0	0	14	23
• Rams	7	7	7	7	28

- Date: September 22
- Location: San Angelo Stadium
  San Angelo, TX
- Game start: 6:00 p.m.
- Elapsed time: 3:10
- Game attendance: 7,320
- Game weather: 93 °F (34 °C), Wind: SE 5, Clear skies
- Referee: Dwayne Mckee; Stephen Borgman (Umpire); Brad Morrow (Linesman); Cody Hord (Line judge); Matt Horn (Back judge); Rory Bernard (Field judge); Jesse Mendoza (Side judge); ASU Athletics (Scorer)

Scoring summary
1	13:16	ACU	Demarcus Thompson 33 yd pass from Mitchell Gale (Morgan Lineberry kick failed)	ACU 6–0
1	09:21	ACU	Morgan Lineberry 32 yd field goal	ACU 9–0
1	06:22	ASU	Blake Hamblin 1 yd run (Jarred Martin kick)	ACU 9–7
2	4:14	ASU	Donavan Roberts 8 yd run (Jarred Martin kick)	ASU 14-9
3	01:50	ASU	Blake Hamblin 3 yd run (Jarred Martin kick)	ASU 21–9
4	14:48	ACU	Elton Crochran 33 yd pass from Mitchell Gale (Morgan Lineberry kick)	ASU 21–16
4	09:11	ASU	Joey Knight 13 yd pass from Blake Hamblin (Jarred Martin kick)	ASU 28–16
4	07:55	ACU	Taylor Gabriel 17 yd pass from Mitchell Gale (Morgan Lineberry kick)	ASU 28–23

The first true road trip waited No.19 ACU (2-1) when they visited Angelo State in San Angelo, Texas. ACU had won 9 out 10 last meetings against the Rams.

Abilene Christian was held to only 9 rushing yards the whole game while giving up 7 sacks in the 23–28 loss to Angelo State.

== Personnel ==
=== Coaching staff ===
Abilene Christian Wildcats coaches

Head coach

- Ken Collums

Assistant coaches

- Mike Ribaudo – Linebackers coach
- Darian Dulin – Defensive coordinator and secondary coach
- Kendrick Holloway – Wide receivers coach
- Nathan Young – Running backs coach, quarterbacks coach, recruiting coordinator
- Sam Collins – offensive line coach

=== Roster ===
2012 Abilene Christian Wildcats
Quarterback: 12 Malcom Ruben – (redshirt) freshman; 14 Parker McKenzie – freshman; 15 Mitchell Gale – (redshirt) senior; 17 John David Baker – (redshirt) junior; Running back: 8 Marcel Threat – (redshirt) sophomore; 26 Charcandrik West – junior; 27 Travis Tarver II– (redshirt) freshman; Wide receiver: 1 Cade Stone – freshman; 4 Taylor Gabriel – junior; 6 DeMarcus Thompson – sophomore; 16 Drew Peters – (redshirt) sophomore; 23 Jace Hudson – (redshirt) freshman; 38 Darrel Cantu-Harkless – (redshirt) junior; 47 Darian Hogg – (redshirt) junior; 82 Monte Green-Avery – (redshirt) freshman; 83 Temi Ogunleye – (redshirt) freshman; Tight end: 19 Jonahtan Parker – sophomore; 86 Noah Chesier – (redshirt) sophomore; 87 Zack Agnew – (redshirt) sophomore; 88 Jamie Walker – (redshirt) freshman	Offensive line: 58 Reid Ware – junior; 61 Josh Perez – (redshirt) junior; 64 Garrett Langthorp – junior; 66 Ben Kittley – (redshirt) freshman; 70 Blake Spears – (redshirt) junior; 74 Tyler McIntosh – (redshirt) sophomore; 76 Colton Carnes – (redshirt) sophomore; 78 Logan Hoppenrath – (redshirt) sophomore; 79 Maxfield Priestley – (redshirt) freshman; Defensive line: 15 Ryan Smith – (redshirt) senior; 33 Rob Boyd – (redshirt) sophomore; 54 Kolby Rowe – (redshirt) sophomore; 55 Candon Canady – junior; 73 Ashton Thomas – (redshirt) sophomore; 95 Nick Finney – junior; 95 Juan Hull II – (redshirt) freshman; 99 Brandon Dornak – (redshirt) sophomore; Deep Snapper: 40 Brent Schroder – junior; Kickers: 81 Spencer Covey – (redshirt) senior; 85 Morgan Lineberry – senior	Linebacker: 2 Chris Summers – (redshirt) sophomore; 5 Nick Richardson – (redshirt) sophomore; 9 Thor Woerner – (redshirt) junior; 14 Jesse Harper – (redshirt) junior; 20 Justin Stephens – (redshirt) sophomore; 22 Elton Crochran – (redshirt) freshman; 36 Cy Wilson – (redshirt) freshman; 41 Blake Rudd – (redshirt) sophomore; 42 David Guinn – (redshirt) freshman; 45 Chuck Oputa – freshman; 46 Torren Davis – (redshirt) freshman; 51 Avery Alegeh – (redshirt) freshman; Defensive back: 3 Justin Steward – sophomore; 7 L.B. Suggs – (redshirt) senior; 18 Vicente Cantu-Harkless – sophomore; 21 Angel Lopes – (redshirt) sophomore; 24 Eric Frain – junior; 25 Mike Wallage – senior; 29 Tyler Chapa – freshman; 30 Keith Barnett – sophomore; 31 Steven Ford – senior; 32 Lynn Grady – sophomore; 34 Caleb Withrow – (redshirt) junior; 43 Dax Riley – (redshirt) sophomore

== Weekly awards ==
Week 1 defensive player of the week: Nick Richardson. He had six sacks against McMurry.

Week 1 honorably mention: Mitchell Gale completed 68 percent of his passes for 290 yards.

Week 3 offensive player of the week: Taylor Gabriel (WR), who had 5 catches for 50 yards and two touchdowns.

Week 3 honorable mention: L.B. Suggs tipped the ball that ended in the first half, preventing Tarleton State being more than 10 points up at the half. He had also a game-high 11 tackles.
