= Zach Zulli =

American gridiron football player (born 1991)

Profile
- Position: Quarterback

Personal information
- Born: May 1, 1991 (age 35); Schwenksville, Pennsylvania, U.S.
- Listed height: 6 ft 2 in (1.88 m)
- Listed weight: 208 lb (94 kg)

Career information
- High school: Collegeville (PA) Perkiomen Valley
- College: Shippensburg
- NFL draft: 2014: undrafted

Career history
- Montreal Alouettes (2014)*; Harrisburg Stampede (2015)*; Lehigh Valley Steelhawks (2015)
- * Offseason or practice squad member only

Awards and highlights
- Harlon Hill Trophy (2012)

Zach Zulli (born May 1, 1991) is an American former football quarterback. He played college football for the Shippensburg Red Raiders from 2009 to 2013. Zulli won the Harlon Hill Trophy as the top player in the NCAA Division II in 2012 in his junior year at Shippensburg University of Pennsylvania.

== College ==
In 2012, Zulli led Shippensburg to an overall record of eleven wins and two losses (11–2) and to the second round of the playoffs. During the season, he led all divisions of college football for the 2012 season with his 54 touchdown passes and 4,747 passing yards. He also tied the NCAA Division II record for touchdown passes in a single season and established new records for both total points scored (344) and total touchdowns (57). In recognition of his season, Zulli was awarded the 2012 Harlon Hill Trophy as the top player in NCAA Division II football. As he won the award as a junior, Zulli became only the seventh underclassman to win the award and the first since Danny Woodhead in 2006.

== Professional ==
After the 2014 NFL Draft Zulli received a phone call from the Seattle Seahawks to attend the 2014 rookie mini-camp on a tryout basis. Zulli was not signed after displaying an impressive win during the team scrimmage with stats of 12-19 for 132 yards and a touchdown. Although Zulli wasn't signed by the team, he made a good impression on head coach Pete Carroll. After Zulli's tryout with the Seahawks he signed a professional contract with the Montreal Alouettes on June 25, 2014, where he will be on their practice roster. After originally signing with the Harrisburg Stampede, Zulli became a free agent when the Stampede suspended operations on December 30, 2014. He was signed by the Lehigh Valley Steelhawks, also of the Professional Indoor Football League.
