= Nate Slaughter =

American football player (born 1992)

Profile
- Position: Wide receiver

Personal information
- Born: August 21, 1992 (age 34); Lubbock, Texas, U.S.
- Listed height: 5 ft 9 in (1.75 m)
- Listed weight: 185 lb (84 kg)

Career information
- High school: Lubbock
- College: West Texas A&M
- NFL draft: 2014: undrafted

Career history
- Houston Texans (2014); Jacksonville Jaguars (2014); Arizona Cardinals (2015)*
- * Offseason or practice squad member only
- Stats at Pro Football Reference

Nathan Slaughter (born August 21, 1992) is an American former football wide receiver.

== Early life ==
Slaughter attended Lubbock High School in Lubbock, Texas under Coach Mike Speck. As a sophomore, he recorded 14 receptions for 98 yards and two touchdowns and earned honorable mention honors. During his junior season, Slaughter recorded 37 catches for 430 yards and three touchdowns and earned honorable mention honors. In his senior season, Slaughter was named a first-team all-District and honorable mention all-State selection after recording 81 receptions for 898 yards and eight touchdowns. Slaughter was a multi-talented athlete, playing cornerback, free safety, wide receiver, and running back. Slaughter also lettered in track & field and basketball.

== College career ==
Slaughter attended West Texas A&M University between 2010-2012 and tallied 133 receptions for 1,563 yards and 11 touchdowns during his three years on the team. He also tallied 25 kick returns for 565 yards and three punt returns for 34 yards. Over his collegiate career, Slaughter amassed multiple honors, such as All-Lone Star Conference Honorable Mention team in 2011, LSC Offensive Player of the Week honoree in 2012, and Academic All-Conference and first-team CoSIDA/Capital One Academic All-America in 2012.

== Professional career ==
Slaughter was signed by the Houston Texans on May 16, 2014. He was released on May 19, 2014.

Slaughter was signed by the Jacksonville Jaguars on June 20, 2014. He was waived by the Jaguars on November 13, 2014.

Slaughter signed a two-year deal with the Arizona Cardinals on March 23, 2015. On May 7, 2015, Slaughter was waived by the Cardinals. He was the first player from the 2015 Veteran Combine to sign a contract.

== Coaching career ==
Slaughter began his Head coaching career at the high school level at Bishop Dunne Catholic School in 2020. He won a district championship during the 2022 season, finishing 7-4.
