= 2012 NCAA Division II football rankings =

The 2012 NCAA Division II football rankings are from the American Football Coaches Association (AFCA). This is for the 2012 season.

== Legend ==
	Increase in ranking
	Decrease in ranking
	Not ranked previous week
(#–#)	Win–loss record
(Italics)	Number of first place votes
т	Tied with team above or below also with this symbol

== American Football Coaches Association poll ==
	Preseason	Week 1 Sept 4	Week 2 Sept 11	Week 3 Sept 18	Week 4 Sept 25	Week 5 Oct 2	Week 6 Oct 9	Week 7 Oct 16	Week 8 Oct 23	Week 9 Oct 30	Week 10 Nov 6	Week 11 Nov 13	Week 12 Postseason	
1.	Pittsburg State (21)	Pittsburg State (1–0) (28)	Pittsburg State (2–0) (29)	Pittsburg State (3–0) (29)	Pittsburg State (4–0) (29)	Pittsburg State (4–0) (29)	Pittsburg State (5–0) (29)	CSU Pueblo (7–0) (23)	CSU Pueblo (8–0) (24)	CSU Pueblo (9–0) (24)	CSU Pueblo (10–0) (23)	CSU Pueblo (11–0) (24)	Valdosta State (12–2) (30)	1.
2.	Minnesota–Duluth (5)	Minnesota–Duluth (1–0)	Minnesota–Duluth (2–0)	Minnesota–Duluth (3–0)	Minnesota–Duluth (4–0)	CSU Pueblo (5–0)	CSU Pueblo (6–0)	Winston–Salem State (7–0) (6)	Winston–Salem State (8–0) (6)	Winston–Salem State (9–0) (6)	Winston–Salem State (10–0) (6)	Winston–Salem State (11–0) (6)	Winston–Salem State (14–1)	2.
3.	Northwest Missouri State (1)	Northwest Missouri State (1–0)	CSU Pueblo (2–0)	CSU Pueblo (3–0)	CSU Pueblo (4–0)	Grand Valley State (5–0)	Winston–Salem State (6–0) (1)	New Haven (6–0)	New Haven (7–0)	New Haven (8–0)	New Haven (9–0)	New Haven (10–0)	Minnesota State (13–1)	3.
4.	Midwestern State (1)	Midwestern State (0–0)	Grand Valley State (2–0)	Grand Valley State (3–0)	Grand Valley State (4–0)	Winston–Salem State (5–0) (1)	Missouri Western (6–0)	Bloomsburg (7–0)	Bloomsburg (8–0)	Northwest Missouri State (8–1)	Northwest Missouri State (9–1) (1)	Ashland (11–0)	West Texas A&M (12–3)	4.
5.	Wayne State (MI) (1)	Wayne State (MI) (0–0) (1)	Winston–Salem State (2–0) (1)	Winston–Salem State (3–0) (1)	Winston–Salem State (4–0) (1)	Missouri Western (5–0)	New Haven (5–0)	Northwest Missouri State (6–1) (1)	Northwest Missouri State (7–1)	Ashland (9–0)	Ashland (10–0)	Minnesota State (11–0)	Missouri Western (12–2)	5.
6.	CSU Pueblo	CSU Pueblo (1–0)	California (PA) (2–0)	California (PA) (3–0)	California (PA) (4–0)	New Haven (4–0)	Bloomsburg (6–0)	Ashland (7–0)	Ashland (8–0)	Minnesota State (9–0)	Minnesota State (10–0)	Henderson State (10–0)	CSU Pueblo (12–1)	6.
7.	Grand Valley State	Grand Valley State (1–0)	New Haven (2–0)	Missouri Western (3–0)	Missouri Western (4–0)	Bloomsburg (5–0)	Northwest Missouri State (5–1)	Minnesota–Duluth (6–1) т	Minnesota State (8–0)	Shippensburg (9–0)	Shippensburg (10–0)	Minnesota–Duluth (10–1)	IUP (12–2)	7.
8.	Valdosta State	Winston–Salem State (1–0) (1)	Missouri Western (2–0)	New Haven (3–0)	New Haven (4–0)	Northwest Missouri State (4–1)	Ashland (6–0)	Pittsburg State (5–1) т	Minnesota–Duluth (7–1)	Henderson State (9–0)	Henderson State (9–0)	Midwestern State (9–1)	New Haven (10–1)	8.
9.	Winston–Salem State (1)	Abilene Christian (1–0)	Washburn (2–0)	Washburn (3–0)	Humboldt State (4–0)	Ashland (5–0)	Minnesota–Duluth (5–1)	Minnesota State (7–0)	Henderson State (8–0)	Minnesota–Duluth (8–1)	Midwestern State (8–1)	Missouri Western (10–1)	Ashland (11–1)	9.
10.	Abilene Christian	California (PA) (1–0)	Saginaw Valley State (2–0)	Humboldt State (3–0)	Bloomsburg (4–0)	Minnesota–Duluth (4–1)	Minnesota State (6–0)	Ouachita Baptist (6–0)	Shippensburg (8–0)	Midwestern State (7–1)	Minnesota–Duluth (9–1)	Bloomsburg (10–1)	Northwest Missouri State (10–3)	10.
11.	California (PA)	Kutztown (1–0)	Humboldt State (2–0)	Bloomsburg (3–0)	Northwest Missouri State (3–1)	Ouachita Baptist (4–0)	Ouachita Baptist (5–0)	Henderson State (7–0)	Midwestern State (6–1)	Missouri Western (8–1)	Missouri Western (9–1)	IUP (10–1)	Henderson State (10–1)	11.
12.	Kutztown	New Haven (1–0)	Bloomsburg (2–0)	Northwest Missouri State (2–1)	Ouachita Baptist (3–0)	Minnesota State (5–0)	Henderson State (6–0)	Midwestern State (5–1)	Missouri Western (7–1)	West Texas A&M (8–1)	Bloomsburg (9–1)	Harding (9–1)	Minnesota–Duluth (10–2)	12.
13.	New Haven	West Alabama (1–0)	Northwest Missouri State (1–1)	Ouachita Baptist (2–0)	Ashland (4–0)	Midwestern State (3–1)	Midwestern State (4–1)	Shippensburg (7–0)	California (PA) (7–1)	Bloomsburg (8–1)	IUP (9–1)	Northwest Missouri State (9–2)	Carson–Newman (9–3)	13.
14.	Delta State	Missouri Western (1–0)	Texas A&M–Kingsville (2–0)	IUP (3–0)	Midwestern State (2–1)	Henderson State (5–0)	Grand Valley State (5–1)	California (PA) (6–1)	West Texas A&M (7–1)	IUP (8–1)	Harding (8–1)	Tuskegee (9–1)	Shippensburg (11–2)	14.
15.	West Alabama	Washburn (1–0)	Ouachita Baptist (2–0)	Midwestern State (1–1)	Minnesota State (4–0)	Saginaw Valley State (4–1)	California (PA) (5–1) т	Saginaw Valley State (6–1)	Emporia State (8–0)	Miles (8–1)	Grand Valley State (8–2)	Shippensburg (10–1)	Indianapolis (10–3)	15.
16.	St. Cloud State	Albany State (1–0)	Midwestern State (0–1)	Valdosta State (2–1)	Saginaw Valley State (3–1)	California (PA) (4–1)	Shippensburg (6–0) т	Missouri Western (6–1)	IUP (7–1) т	Harding (7–1)	Tuskegee (8–1)	West Texas A&M (9–2)	Midwestern State (9–2)	16.
17.	Hillsdale	Humboldt State (1–0)	IUP (2–0)	Ashland (3–0)	Henderson State (4–0)	Shippensburg (5–0)	Saginaw Valley State (5–1)	West Texas A&M (6–1)	Washburn (7–1) т	Sioux Falls (8–1)	West Texas A&M (8–2)	Valdosta State (8–2)	Bloomsburg (10–2)	17.
18.	Missouri Western	Saginaw Valley State (1–0)	Valdosta State (1–1)	Colorado Mines (3–0)	Wayne State (MI) (2–1)	West Alabama (4–1)	Wayne State (MI) (4–1)	Emporia State (7–0)	Miles (7–1)	Pittsburg State (6–2)	Valdosta State (8–2)	Indianapolis (9–2)	Chadron State (9–3)	18.
19.	Shepherd	Bloomsburg (1–0)	Wayne State (MI) (0–1)	Abilene Christian (2–1)	West Alabama (3–1)	Wayne State (MI) (3–1)	Washburn (5–1)	Washburn (6–1)	Harding (6–1)	Grand Valley State (7–2)	Indianapolis (8–2)	Missouri S&T (10–1)	Harding (9–2)	19.
20.	Washburn	Valdosta State (0–1)	Abilene Christian (1–1)	Saginaw Valley State (2–1)	Washburn (3–1)	Washburn (4–1)	West Texas A&M (5–1)	IUP (6–1)	Ouachita Baptist (6–1)	Emporia State (8–1)	Missouri S&T (9–1)	Chadron State (9–2)	Lenoir–Rhyne (9–3)	20.
21.	Humboldt State	Ouachita Baptist (1–0)	Kutztown (1–1)	Wayne State (MI) (1–1)	Shippensburg (4–0)	West Texas A&M (4–1)	Emporia State (6–0)	Miles (6–1)	Sioux Falls (7–1)	West Alabama (7–2)	Chadron State (8–2)	Sioux Falls (9–2)	West Alabama (9–4)	21.
22.	Albany State	Delta State (0–1)	Ashland (2–0)	Minnesota State (3–0) (Note: In the actual printed polls, Minnesota State was listed as Minnesota State–Mankato)	IUP (3–1)	IUP (4–1)	IUP (5–1)	Michigan Tech (5–1)	Pittsburg State (5–2)	California (PA) (7–2)	Sioux Falls (8–2)	Carson–Newman (8–2)	Emporia State (10–2)	22.
23.	North Greenville	IUP (1–0) (Note: In the actual printed polls, IUP was listed as Indiana (PA))	Colorado Mines (2–0)	West Alabama (2–1)	West Texas A&M (3–1)	Sioux Falls (5–0)	Harding (5–0)	Sioux Falls (6–1)	Grand Valley State (6–2)	Tuskegee (7–1)	Miles (8–2)	Miles (8–2)	Tuskegee (10–2)	23.
24.	West Texas A&M	Texas A&M–Kingsville (1–0)	West Alabama (1–1)	Henderson State (3–0)	Newberry (4–0)	Humboldt State (4–1)	UNC Pembroke (5–1)	Grand Valley State (5–2)	Hillsdale (6–2)	Valdosta State (7–2)	Carson–Newman (7–2)	Emporia State (9–2)	Missouri S&T (10–1)	24.
25.	Bloomsburg	Hillsdale (0–1)	Delta State (1–1)	West Texas A&M (2–1)	Sioux Falls (4–0)	Emporia State (5–0)	Shepherd (5–1)	Harding (5–1)	Charleston (7–1)	Washburn (7–2)	Emporia State (8–2)	Charleston (9–2) т	Shepherd (8–3)	25.
26.												Shepherd (8–2) т		26.
	Preseason	Week 1 Sept 4	Week 2 Sept 11	Week 3 Sept 18	Week 4 Sept 25	Week 5 Oct 2	Week 6 Oct 9	Week 7 Oct 16	Week 8 Oct 23	Week 9 Oct 30	Week 10 Nov 6	Week 11 Nov 13	Week 12 Postseason	
		Dropped: 16 St. Cloud State; 19 Shepherd; 23 North Greenville; 24 West Texas A&M	Dropped: 16 Albany State; 25 Hillsdale	Dropped: 14 Texas A&M–Kingsville; 21 Kutztown; 25 Delta State	Dropped: 16 Valdosta State; 18 Colorado Mines; 19 Abilene Christian	Dropped: 24 Newberry	Dropped: 18 West Alabama; 23 Sioux Falls; 24 Humboldt State	Dropped: 18 Wayne State (MI); 24 UNC Pembroke; 25 Shepherd	Dropped: 15 Saginaw Valley State; 22 Michigan Tech	Dropped: 20 Ouachita Baptist; 24 Hillsdale; 25 Charleston	Dropped: 18 Pittsburg State; 21 West Alabama; 22 California (PA); 25 Washburn	Dropped: 15 Grand Valley State	Dropped: 21 Sioux Falls; 23 Miles; 25 Charleston	
