= Javelina Stadium =

Sports venue in Kingsville, Texas

Coordinates: 27°31′44″N 97°52′48″W

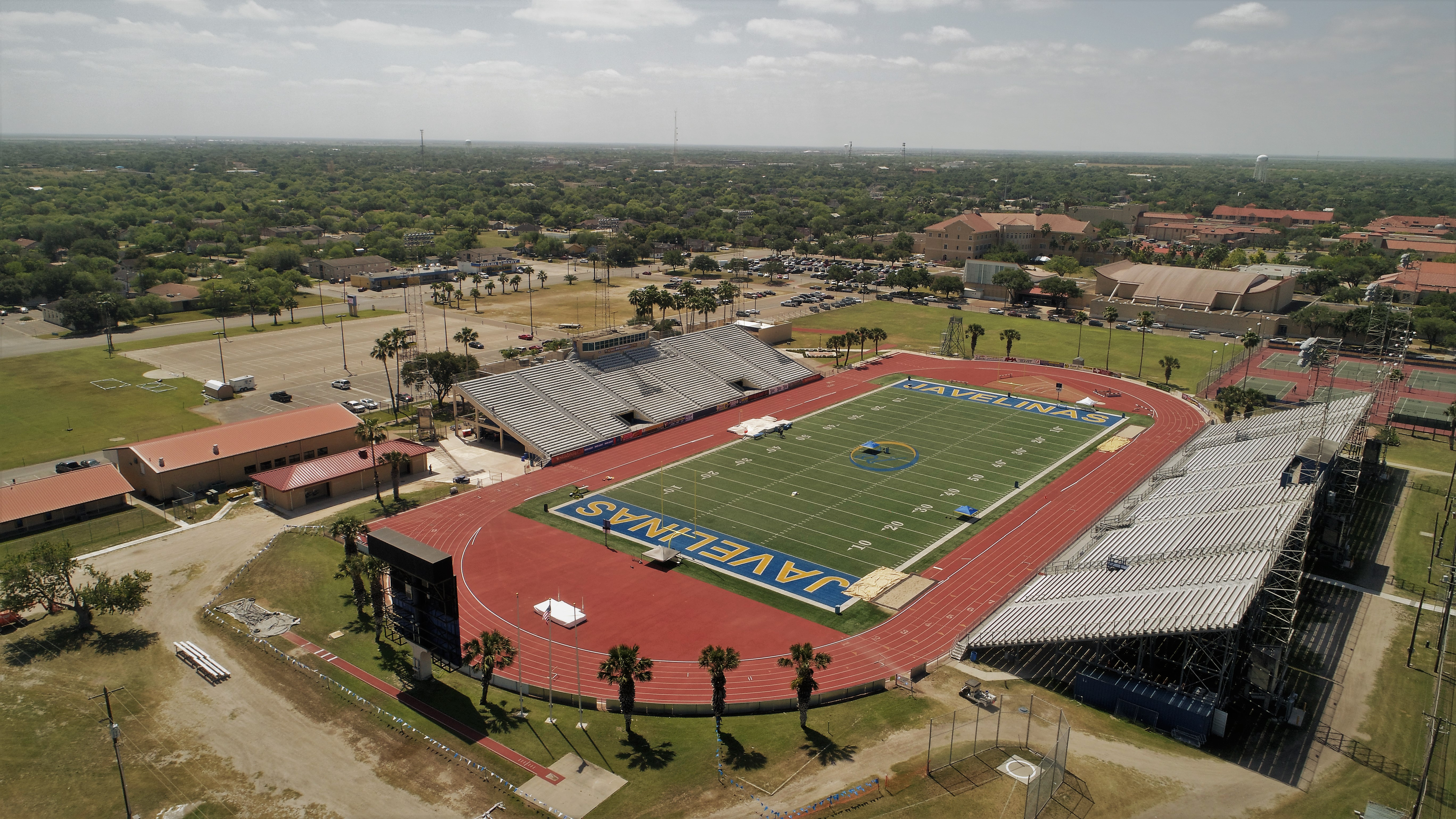
- Interactive map of Javelina Stadium
- Location: Kingsville, Texas
- Owner: Texas A&M University–Kingsville
- Operator: Texas A&M University–Kingsville
- Capacity: 15,000
- Surface: Artificial turf

Construction
- Opened: 1950

Tenant
- Texas A&M University–Kingsville Javelinas (NCAA Division II)

Javelina Stadium is a stadium in Kingsville, Texas. It is primarily used for American football, and is the home field of Texas A&M University–Kingsville. The stadium holds 15,000 people and opened in 1950.

A new scoreboard was installed during the 2006 football season. The scoreboard is the largest scoreboard in NCAA Division II. The scoreboard is 36 feet (11 m) wide and 36 feet (11 m) tall and stands 12 feet (3.7 m) off the ground. The video display is over 15 feet (5 m) tall and 20 feet (6 m) wide. It features a three camera system and a fully functional production room located under the east side grandstand.

As the home of the Javelinas, the stadium has seen Texas A&M-Kingsville win 7 National Championships in 1959, 1969, 1970, 1974, 1975, 1976, and 1979. Also of note, the Javelinas achieved a 42-game winning streak - undefeated and untied from their last game of 1973 through the third game of 1977.

In addition to college football, the stadium serves as the home of Henrietta M. King High School's football team and is often selected as a neutral site for high school football playoff games.

From 2001 to 2011, it hosted the Cactus Bowl, an all-star game for NCAA Division II seniors.

== Gallery ==
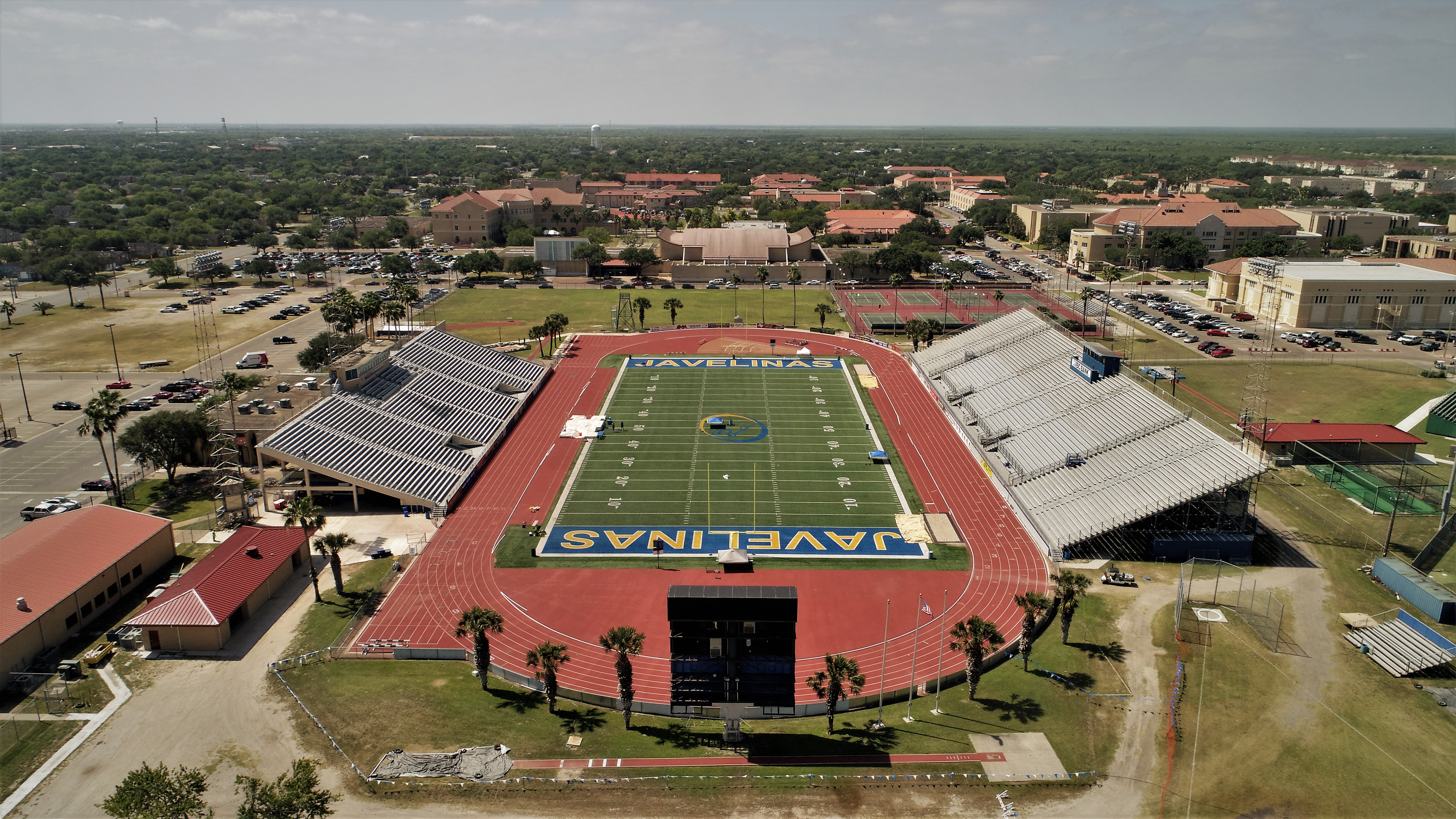

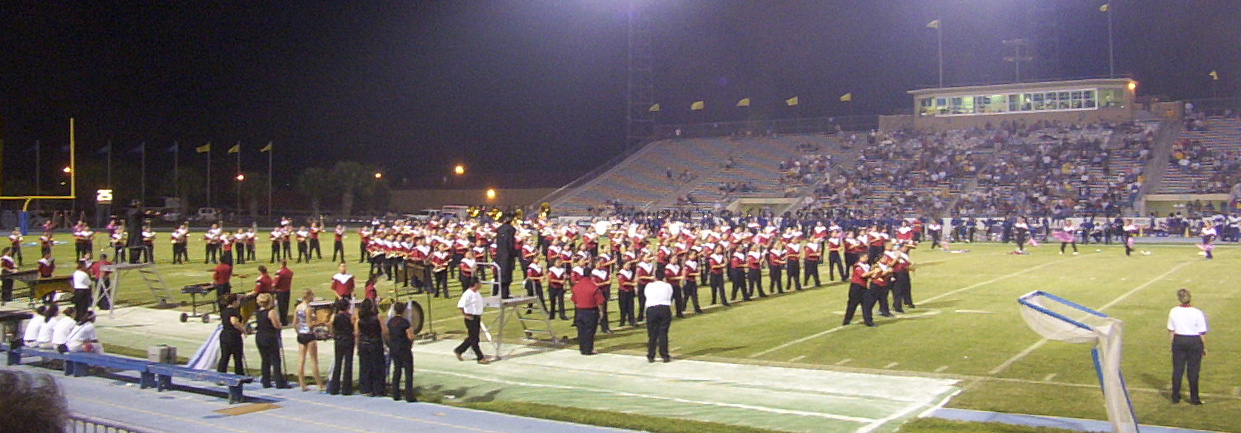

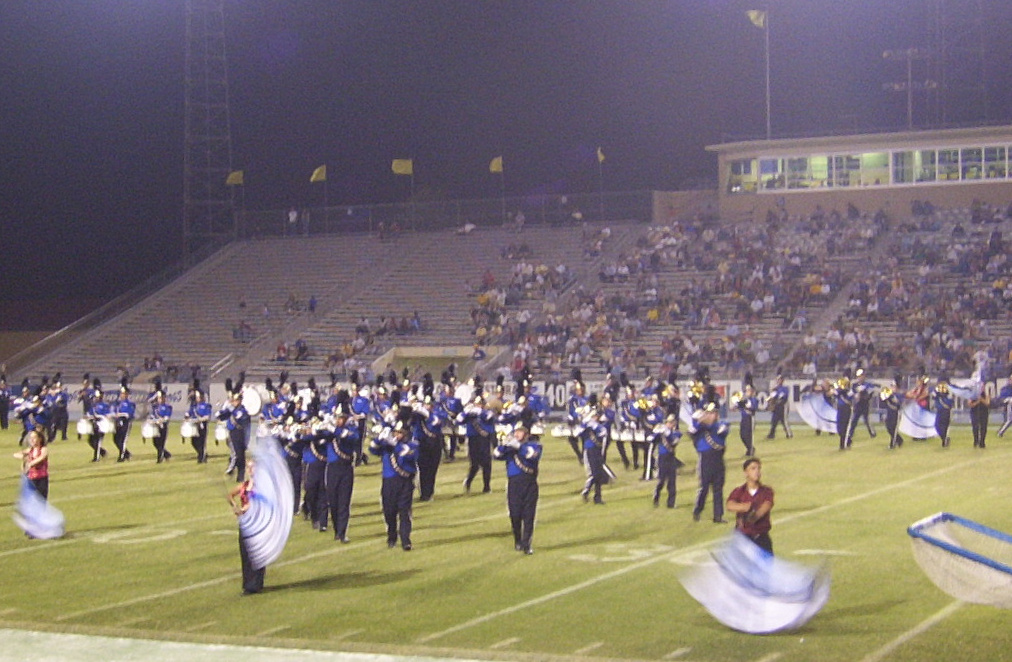
