= Kanza Bowl =

Coordinates: 39.060068°N 95.712805°W

Kanza Bowl (defunct)
- Stadium: Hummer Sports Complex
- Location: Topeka, Kansas; United States
- Operated: 2009–2012
- Conference tie-ins: LSC, MIAA

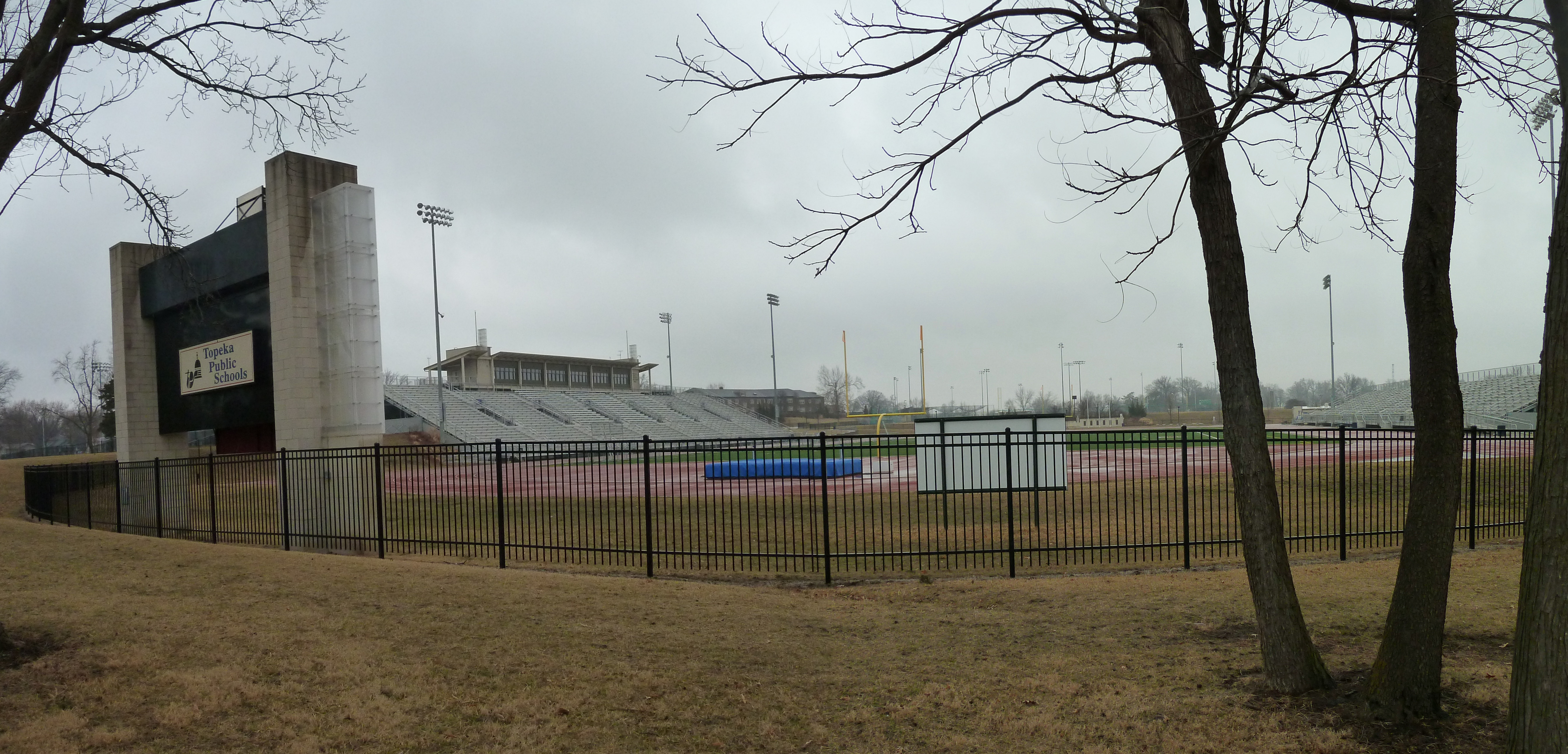
Hummer Sports Complex

The Kanza Bowl was an American NCAA Division II college football bowl game between teams from the Lone Star Conference (LSC) and the Mid-America Intercollegiate Athletics Association (MIAA). The game was played on the first Saturday of December from 2009 through 2012 in Topeka, Kansas. In 2010, it was rebranded as the Lower Inc. Kanza Bowl after being sponsored by local plumbing company Lower Inc.

== History ==
The game featured the top-placing teams in the Lone Star Conference (LSC) and Mid-America Intercollegiate Athletics Association (MIAA) not qualifying for the NCAA Division II National Football Championship playoffs. In the case of the MIAA, which at the time also sent a team to the Mineral Water Bowl in Excelsior Springs, Missouri, to play against a team from the Northern Sun Intercollegiate Conference (NSIC), the top non-playoff team had the option of choosing the Mineral Water Bowl over the Kanza Bowl; in that case, the MIAA bid to the Kanza Bowl would be offered to the league's next-highest ranking team.

During its brief existence, the Kanza Bowl joined the Mineral Water Bowl and Pioneer Bowl as the only three active Division II bowl games. (The Utah-based Dixie Rotary Bowl had ceased operations after the 2008 season.) The game was played at the recently developed Hummer Sports Complex, in a 6,000-seat football stadium built for Topeka public high schools. The $17.5 million facility opened in 2003 on the grounds of the former Topeka State Hospital.

When the game was established in 2009, the two conferences made a commitment to continue it for at least four seasons. The arrangement was allowed to lapse after that time. Due to financial difficulties and lack of a core sponsor, the 2013 Kanza Bowl was canceled in August 2013, and the game was never resumed.

The MIAA and LSC subsequently joined the new Great American Conference (GAC) in providing teams for the Live United Texarkana Bowl in Texarkana, Arkansas, and the Heritage Bowl in Corsicana, Texas.

== Game results ==
Date	Winner	Score	Loser	Score	Notes
December 5, 2009	West Texas A&M (LSC)	31	Nebraska–Omaha (MIAA)	25	
December 4, 2010	Washburn (MIAA)	45	Midwestern State (LSC)	14	
November 26, 2011	West Texas A&M (LSC)	26	Central Missouri (MIAA)	7	
November 25, 2012	Emporia State (MIAA)	45	Texas A&M–Kingsville (LSC)	38	
