= 2015 NCAA Division II Field Hockey Championship =

Tournament details
- Country: United States
- Teams: 6

Final positions
- Champions: East Stroudsburg (1st title)
- Runners-up: Merrimack (1st title match)

Tournament statistics
- Matches played: 5
- Goals scored: 16 (3.2 per match)

The 2015 NCAA Division II Field Hockey Championship was the 27th women's collegiate field hockey tournament to determine the top NCAA Division II college field hockey team in the United States. The semifinals and championship match were played at Steph Pettit Stadium at Bloomsburg University in Bloomsburg, Pennsylvania from November 20 to 22, 2015.

Millersville are the defending national champions.

== Qualified teams ==
- The total number of teams remained fixed at 6. Teams qualified for the tournament based on their regional rankings at the end of the season, with the top three teams from each region making the final bracket.

=== Atlantic Region ===
Rank	Team	Record
#1	East Stroudsburg	17–3
#2	Millersville	18–2
#3	West Chester	15–4

=== East Region ===
Rank	Team	Record
#1	Stonehill	14–6
#2	Merrimack	14–5
#3	Adelphi	14–5

== Bracket ==
First Round; November 14, 2015; Campus sites
East Region
E2	Merrimack*	2
E3	Adelphi	1
Atlantic Region
A2	Millersville*	1
A3	West Chester	2

Semifinals; November 20, 2015; Bloomsburg, PA
E1	Stonehill	0
E2	Merrimack	1
A1	East Stroudsburg	6
A3	West Chester	2

Championship; November 22, 2015; Bloomsburg, PA
E2	Merrimack	0
A1	East Stroudsburg	1

== See also ==
- NCAA Division I Field Hockey Championship
- NCAA Division III Field Hockey Championship
