= 1965 East Stroudsburg Warriors football team =

American college football season

1965 East Stroudsburg Warriors football
- Offensive backfield. Quarterback Glen Ray kneeling. Standing from left to right: halfback Barry Roach, fullback Steve Kun; and halfback Leo Reimer.

PSCAC champion PSCAC East Division champion

PSCAC Championship Game, W 26–10 vs. Indiana (PA)
- Conference: Pennsylvania State College Athletic Conference
- East Division
- Record: 10–0 (6–0 PSCAC)
- Head coach: Jack Gregory (7th season)
- Home stadium: Stroudsburg Memorial Stadium

1965 Pennsylvania State College Athletic Conference football standings
	Conf.					Overall
Team	W		L		T	W		L		T
East Division
No. 8/10 East Stroudsburg xy$	6	–	0	–	0	10	–	0	–	0
West Chester	5	–	1	–	0	5	–	3	–	0
Mansfield	4	–	2	–	0	4	–	5	–	0
Bloomsburg	3	–	3	–	0	4	–	4	–	0
Millersville	2	–	4	–	0	4	–	4	–	0
Cheyney	1	–	5	–	0	2	–	5	–	0
Kutztown	0	–	6	–	0	1	–	7	–	0
West Division
Indiana (PA) xy	5	–	1	–	0	7	–	3	–	0
Clarion	4	–	1	–	1	6	–	2	–	1
California (PA)	4	–	2	–	0	5	–	3	–	0
Lock Haven	3	–	3	–	0	5	–	3	–	0
Slippery Rock	2	–	3	–	1	4	–	3	–	1
Shippensburg	2	–	4	–	0	3	–	5	–	0
Edinboro *	0	–	6	–	0	6	–	2	–	1
Championship: East Stroudsburg 26, Indiana (PA) 10
$ – Conference champion; x – Division champion/co-champions; y – Championship game participant; * – Edinboro forfeited four conference victories—over IUP, Clarion, Shippensburg, and California—but NCAA and Edinboro records do not reflect the forfeits in the team's overall record.; Rankings from NAIA poll and AP small college poll

The 1965 East Stroudsburg Warriors football team was an American football team that represented East Stroudsburg State College (now known as East Stroudsburg University of Pennsylvania) as a member of the Pennsylvania State College Athletic Conference (PSCAC) during the 1965 NAIA football season. In their seventh year under head coach Jack Gregory, the Warriors compiled a perfect 10–0 record (6–0 against PSCAC opponents), won the PSCAC championship, and outscored opponents by a total of 273 to 63. The team received an invitation to play in the National Association of Intercollegiate Athletics (NAIA) Bowl in Bloomington, Minnesota, but declined the invitation.

The 1965 season was one of three perfect seasons in East Stroudsburg's football history, the others being 1942 (6–0) and 1975 (10–0).

Three East Stroudsburg players were selected as first-team players on the 1965 All-Pennsylvania college football team: offensive tackle Bob Ruckdeshel; defensive end Larry Helwig; and defensive back Barry Roach.

The team played its home games at the new Stroudsburg Memorial Stadium in East Stroudsburg, Pennsylvania.

== Schedule ==
Date	Opponent	Site	Result	Attendance	Source
September 18	at Southern Connecticut*	Bowen Field; New Haven, CT	W 30–16	7,500	
September 25	Montclair State*	Stroudsburg Memorial Stadium; East Stroudsburg, PA	W 7–6	4,000	
October 1	West Chester	Stroudsburg Memorial Stadium; East Stroudsburg, PA	W 13–6	5,500	
October 9	at Kutztown	Kutztown, PA	W 26–13		
October 16	at Cheyney	Cheyney, PA	W 40–0		
October 23	Mansfield State^{†}	Stroudsburg Memorial Stadium; East Stroudsburg, PA	W 26–6		
October 30	Millersville	Stroudsburg Memorial Stadium; East Stroudsburg, PA	W 33–6		
November 6	Cortland State*	Stroudsburg Memorial Stadium; East Stroudsburg, PA	W 34–0	4,000	
November 12	at Bloomsburg	Bloomsburg, PA	W 34–0	4,000	
November 20	Indiana (PA)	Stroudsburg Memorial Stadium; East Stroudsburg, PA (PSAC Championship Game)	W 26–10	7,500	
*Non-conference game; ^{†}Homecoming

== Players ==
- Gerry Brace, defensive guard
- Don Cassidy, defensive end
- Gayle Confer, offensive guard
- Dennis Deardorff, offensive guard
- Bruce Derr, offensive end
- Bob Dourand, linebacker and defensive tackle
- Jeff Forsythe, offensive tackle
- Larry Helwig, defensive end and defensive guard, senior, 5'10", 185 pounds, Hanover, Pennsylvania
- Mike Karnish, linebacker
- George Katchak, offensive tackle
- Steve Kun, fullback
- Pete Lee, linebacker
- Doug McNamee, defensive end
- Roy Miller, defensive tackle
- Frank Miriello, linebacker
- Glen Ray, quarterback
- Lee Reimer, halfback
- Barry Roach, halfback and defensive back, senior, 5'10", 172 pounds, Kingston, Pennsylvania
- Gibby Romaine, end
- Bob Ruckdeshel, offensive tackle, senior, 6'1", 229 pounds, Newburgh, New York
- Jim Scagliotto, placekicker
- Mike Thompson, center
- Jim Wolfe, defensive back
