= 1975 East Stroudsburg Warriors football team =

American college football season

1975 East Stroudsburg Warriors football

PSAC champion PSAC East Division champion

PSAC Championship Game, W 24–20 vs. Edinboro
- Conference: Pennsylvania State Athletic Conference
- Eastern Division
- Record: 10–0 (6–0 PSAC)
- Head coach: Dennis Douds (2nd season)
- Home stadium: Stroudsburg High School Stadium

1975 Pennsylvania State Athletic Conference football standings
	Conf.					Overall
Team	W		L		T	W		L		T
East Division
East Stroudsburg xy$	6	–	0	–	0	10	–	0	–	0
Millersville	4	–	2	–	0	6	–	3	–	0
West Chester	3	–	2	–	0	4	–	5	–	0
Kutztown	3	–	3	–	0	3	–	5	–	1
Mansfield	2	–	3	–	0	5	–	4	–	0
Cheyney	2	–	4	–	0	4	–	6	–	0
Bloomsburg	0	–	6	–	0	1	–	8	–	0
West Division
Edinboro xy	6	–	0	–	0	8	–	3	–	0
IUP	4	–	1	–	1	8	–	1	–	1
Clarion	3	–	2	–	1	6	–	2	–	1
Shippensburg	3	–	3	–	0	6	–	5	–	0
Slippery Rock	3	–	3	–	0	4	–	5	–	0
Lock Haven	1	–	5	–	0	1	–	8	–	0
California (PA)	0	–	6	–	0	0	–	8	–	0
Championship: East Stroudsburg 24, Edinboro 20
$ – Conference champion; x – Division champion/co-champions; y – Championship game participant

The 1975 East Stroudsburg Warriors football team was an American football team that represented East Stroudsburg State College (now known as East Stroudsburg University of Pennsylvania) as a member of the East Division of the Pennsylvania State Athletic Conference (PSAC) during the 1975 NCAA Division II football season. In their second year under head coach Dennis Douds, the Warriors compiled a perfect 10–0 record (6–0 against PSAC opponents), won the PSAC championship, and outscored opponents by a total of 226 to 95. The 1975 season was one of three perfect seasons in East Stroudsburg's football history, the others being 1942 (6–0) and 1965 (10–0).

Halfback Pete Radocha led the team 83 points scored. Quarterback Mike Terwilliger led the team in passing. Seven East Stroudsburg players received first-team honors on the 1975 All-Pennsylvania Conference Eastern Division football team: quarterback Mike Terwilliger; center Pat Flaherty; placekicker Bob Boyd; defensive lineman Rich Nichols; defensive end Mike Stambaugh; linebacker Jeff Johnson; and defensive back Willard Stem. Flaherty was also named the first-team center on the Associated Press All-Pennsylvania college football team.

== Schedule ==
Date	Time	Opponent	Site	Result	Attendance	Source
September 13		at Slippery Rock*	Slippery Rock, PA	W 7–0	8,000	
September 20		Montclair State*	Stroudsburg High School Stadium; Stroudsburg, PA	W 14–3	4,900	
September 27		West Chester	East Stroudsburg, PA	W 24–20	7,500	
October 4		at Kutztown	Kutztown, PA	W 35–6	3,500	
October 11		at Cheyney	Coatesville, PA (Steel Bowl)	W 17–7	2,000	
October 18		Mansfield^{†}	East Stroudsburg, PA	W 39–8	4,700	
October 25		Millersville	East Stroudsburg, PA	W 28–24	4,500	
November 1		at Cortland State*	Cortland, NY	W 10–7	300	
November 8		at Bloomsburg	Bloomsburg, PA	W 28–0	4,000	
November 16	1:30 p.m.	Edinboro*	Stroudsburg High School Stadium; Stroudsburg, PA (PSAC Championship Game)	W 24–20	7,700–7,800	
*Non-conference game; ^{†}Homecoming; All times are in Eastern time

== Players ==
- Bob Boyd, placekicker, senior, 5'9", 170 pounds
- Jeff Detzl, offensive tackle
- Pat Flaherty, center, senior, 6'0", 210 pounds
- Jeff Johnson, linebacker, freshman, 6'1", 215 pounds
- Rich Nichols, defensive line, senior, 6'1", 220 pounds
- Tom Palubinski, wide receiver
- Pete Radocha, halfback, 5'11, 200 pounds
- Doug Sheaffer, linebacker
- Mike Stambaugh, defensive end, junior, 6'0", 210 pounds
- Willard Stem, defensive back, senior, 5'11", 182 pounds
- Mike Terwilliger, quarterback, sophomore, 6'2", 180 pounds
