= 1981 NCAA Division II field hockey tournament =

1981 NCAA Division II Field Hockey Championship
Tournament details
- Country: United States
- Teams: 4

Final positions
- Champions: Pfeiffer (1st title)
- Runners-up: Bentley (1st title match)

Tournament statistics
- Matches played: 3
- Goals scored: 12 (4 per match)

The 1981 NCAA Division II Field Hockey Championship was the first annual NCAA-sponsored tournament to determine the top Division II women's college field hockey team in the United States.

The semifinals and championship of the inaugural event were played at Pfeiffer College in Misenheimer, North Carolina.

== Qualified teams ==
- Four teams qualified for the inaugural tournament.

| Team | Record | Appearance |
|---|---|---|
| Adelphi | 6–1–4 | 1st |
| Bentley | 6–5–5 | 1st |
| Chico State | 3–6–2 | 1st |
| Pfeiffer | 7–3–1 | 1st |

== Bracket ==
Semifinals; November 14, 1981; Campus sites
* | Pfeiffer (OT) | 1
Chico State | 0
Adelphi | 1
* | Bentley | 2

Championship; November 21, 1981; Misenheimer, NC
* | Pfeiffer | 5
Bentley | 3

== See also ==
- NCAA Division I Field Hockey Championship
- NCAA Division III Field Hockey Championship
