= 1942 East Stroudsburg Warriors football team =

American college football season

1942 East Stroudsburg Warriors football

PSTCC champion
- Conference: Pennsylvania State Teachers College Conference
- Record: 6–0 (4–0 PSTCC)
- Head coach: Eugene Martin (1st season)

1942 Pennsylvania State Teachers College Conference football standings
	Conf.					Overall
Team	W		L		T	W		L		T
East Stroudsburg $	4	–	0	–	0	6	–	0	–	0
Lock Haven	4	–	0	–	1	6	–	0	–	1
Indiana (PA)	4	–	2	–	0	5	–	3	–	0
Slippery Rock	2	–	2	–	0	4	–	2	–	0
Mansfield	2	–	2	–	1	2	–	2	–	1
West Chester	1	–	2	–	0	5	–	3	–	1
Clarion	1	–	2	–	0	1	–	3	–	0
Edinboro	1	–	2	–	0	1	–	3	–	0
Shippensburg	1	–	4	–	0	2	–	4	–	0
Kutztown	0	–	4	–	0	1	–	4	–	0
$ – Conference champion

The 1942 East Stroudsburg Warriors football team was an American football team that represented East Stroudsburg State Teachers College (now known as East Stroudsburg University of Pennsylvania) as a member of the Pennsylvania State Teachers College Conference (PSTCC) during the 1942 college football season. In their first year under head coach Eugene Martin, the Warriors compiled a perfect 6–0 record (4–0 against conference opponents), won the PSTC championship, shut out four of six opponents, and outscored all opponents by a total of 101 to 13.

The 1942 season was one of three perfect seasons in East Stroudsburg's football history, the others being 1965 (10–0) and 1975 (10–0).

== Schedule ==
Date	Opponent	Site	Result	Attendance	Source
October 10	at Shippensburg	Shippensburg, PA	W 12–0	1,100	
October 17	Kutztown	East Stroudsburg, PA	W 14–0		
October 24	Monclair State*^{†}	East Stroudsburg, PA	W 24–0		
October 31	at Mansfield	Mansfield, PA	W 12–6		
November 14	West Chester	East Stroudsburg, PA	W 26–0		
November 21	at Panzer*	East Orange, NJ	W 13–7		
*Non-conference game; ^{†}Homecoming

== Players ==
The team's starters, based on the game accounts referenced above, were as follows:

- Jimmy Clouser, halfback
- Fedorka, end
- Gaughan, halfback
- Johnny Goepfert, fullback
- Harding, guard
- Holdredge, halfback
- Horvat, guard
- Koval, tackle
- Pasko, end
- Ed Rushin/Ruskin, quarterback
- Robert Shumskis, center
- Sievers, tackle
- B. Williams, guard
