= 1981 NCAA Division III field hockey tournament =

1981 NCAA Division III Field Hockey Championship
Tournament details
- Country: United States
- Teams: 6

Final positions
- Champions: Trenton State; 1st title
- Runners-up: Franklin & Marshall; 1st title match

Tournament statistics
- Matches played: 5
- Goals scored: 16 (3.2 per match)

The 1981 NCAA Division III Field Hockey Championship was the first annual NCAA-sponsored tournament to determine the top Division III women's college field hockey team in the United States.

The semifinals and championship of the inaugural event were played at Westfield State College in Westfield, Massachusetts.

Trenton State (now TCNJ) defeated Franklin & Marshall in the final, 2–0, to win their first national title.

== Qualified teams ==
- Six teams qualified for the inaugural tournament.

Team	Record	Appearance
Elizabethtown	9–5–1	1st
Franklin & Marshall	8–5–1	1st
Frostburg State	7–3–3	1st
Trenton State	13–0–2	1st
Westfield State	9–4–3	1st
Wisconsin–Stevens Point	20–3–0	1st

== Bracket ==
Opening Round; November 14, 1981; Campus sites
Westfield State	2
*	Frostburg State	1
*	Elizabethtown	2
UW–Stevens Point	0

Semifinals; November 20, 1981; Westfield, MA
Trenton State	2
Westfield State	1
Elizabethtown	0
Franklin & Marshall	1

Championship; November 21, 1981; Westfield, MA
Trenton State	2
Franklin & Marshall	0
Third-place
Westfield State (2OT)	3
Elizabethtown	2

== See also ==
- NCAA Division I Field Hockey Championship
- NCAA Division II Field Hockey Championship
