= Dennis Douds =

American football player and coach (born 1941)

Biographical details
- Born: February 16, 1941 (age 85); Indiana, Pennsylvania, U.S.

Playing career
- 1960–1962: Slippery Rock
- Positions: Guard, nose tackle

Coaching career (HC unless noted)
- 1963–1964: McDowell HS (PA) (assistant)
- 1965: West Virginia (asst. freshmen)
- 1966–1967: East Stroudsburg(assistant)
- 1968–1973: East Stroudsburg (DC)
- 1974–2018: East Stroudsburg

Head coaching record
- Overall: 264–204–3
- Tournaments: 4–4 (NCAA D-II playoffs)

Accomplishments and honors

Championships
- 4 PSAC (1975–1976, 1978, 1982); 9 PSAC Eastern Division (1975–1976, 1978, 1980, 1982–1983, 1991, 2002–2003)

Dennis Douds (born February 16, 1941) is an American former football coach and former player. Until his retirement on October 27, 2018, he had been a football coach at East Stroudsburg University of Pennsylvania since 1966 and the head football coach there since 1974. With 230 career coaching wins, he ranks 11th in wins among all active college football coaches across all divisions of the NCAA and NAIA. He played football at Slippery Rock University of Pennsylvania, from which he graduated in 1963.

== Early years ==
Douds is a native of western Pennsylvania, having attended Indiana High School in Indiana, Pennsylvania, and Slippery Rock University in Slippery Rock, Pennsylvania. Douds played football for Slippery Rock University as a right guard on offense and a nose tackle on defense. He earned All-Conference, All-State and NAIA All-America honors, and was named Slippery Rock's outstanding senior athlete in 1962–1963. Douds graduated from Slippery Rock in 1963.

After graduating from Slippery Rock, Douds was hired as an assistant football coach at McDowell High School in suburban Erie, Pennsylvania. In 1965, he was hired as an assistant freshman football coach at West Virginia University while working on a master's degree in physical education.

== East Stroudsburg ==
In 1966, Douds joined the coaching staff at East Stroudsburg University of Pennsylvania in East Stroudsburg, Pennsylvania. He began coaching tight ends and linebackers and became the team's defensive coordinator in 1968. After eight years as an assistant coach under Charles Reese (45–21–2), Douds took over as East Stroudsburg's head football coach in 1974. Douds is also an assistant professor of sport studies at East Stroudsburg.

In his 37 years as head coach, Douds' East Stroudsburg football program has been one of the leading programs in NCAA Division II. Douds has had seven seasons in which his team has won at least nine games, including consecutive undefeated seasons in 1975 (10–0) and 1976 (9–0–1). The 1982 team (9–2) won the Lambert Cup as the top Division II football team in the East.

Douds' quarterback on the undefeated teams of 1975 and 1976 was Mike Terwilliger. Terwilliger joined Douds coaching staff after graduating, and has been Douds' assistant coach for more than 30 years. In 2006, Mike Terwilliger said of Douds, "The man hasn't changed any of his beliefs, any of his principles or the way he coaches football. What separates him from a lot of people around the game of football is that he realizes his job is bigger than what takes place on Saturday afternoons. The neat thing is to see guys came back after 30, 35 years and see the impact he's had on their lives."

Terwilliger's son, Jimmy Terwilliger, also played quarterback for Douds. The younger Terwilliger won the 2005 Harlon Hill Trophy and set 12 NCAA records at ESU, including tying the NCAA record for all levels with 148 career touchdown passes and setting a new Division II record with 16,064 yards of total offense. The 2005 East Stroudsburg team with Terwilliger at quarterback broke the school record with 11 wins, won the Lambert Trophy and produced five All-America selections. Douds said of Terwilliger, "Jimmy Terwilliger is simply the best football player ever in the PSAC, and I give you that with over 50 years of experience in the league."

NFL coach Harry Hiestand also got his start as an assistant coach working under Douds.

Douds won his 200th career victory in 2006, and in 2008, he became the winningest coach in Pennsylvania State Athletic Conference history. On the eve of his 200th win, Douds said, "I never scored a touchdown, never made a tackle, never threw a block, never threw a pass. This represents a great tribute to the thousands of guys who have played here, and the 100 or so coaches who have been with me here in that tenure." As he neared the PSAC coaching wins record, the Associated Press opened its story on Douds' drive to the PSAC coaching wins record as follows:

"Quick, name the Pennsylvania college football coach climbing a career wins list who has spent decades at the same university. The one not named Joe Paterno. He's East Stroudsburg coach Denny Douds, who is a victory away from having the most wins in Pennsylvania State Athletic Conference history."

Interviewed in 2006, Douds said he would stop coaching when it was no longer fun. Asked if he would still be coaching at age 82, like fellow Pennsylvania coaching legend, Joe Paterno, Douds responded, "Am I still breathing at that time?" In May 2010, the 69-year-old Douds gained attention for jumping with the Golden Knights, the United States Army Parachute Team. Douds described jumping from the plane at 13,500 feet as "magnificent." He noted, "I don't care if you're 16, 18 or 22, getting ready to play West Chester or Bloomsburg. If you're 69 and there's something you like to do, go ahead and do it."

Douds concluded his career on October 27, 2018, retiring on the field during the final seconds of a 48–35 loss to Ohio Dominican, walking off the field as the clock ran out.

== Awards and honors ==
Douds has received numerous awards for his accomplishments and contributions to the sport, including the following:

- Douds was named the Kodak College Division Coach of the Year in 1975, 1976, and 1982.
- He was named PSAC Eastern Division Coach of the Year in 1976, 1982, 2002.
- Douds has been inducted into the East Stroudsburg Athletic Hall of Fame (1998), the Slippery Rock University Athletic Hall of Fame, the Indiana County Athletic Hall of Fame and the Northeast Pennsylvania Athletic Hall of Fame.

== Family ==
Douds and his wife, Judy Douds, have a daughter, Jill, a son, Douglas, and five grandchildren.

== Head coaching record ==
Year	Team	Overall	Conference	Standing	Bowl/playoffs
East Stroudsburg Warriors (Pennsylvania State Athletic Conference) (1974–2018)
1974	East Stroudsburg	5–5	4–2	2nd (East)	
1975	East Stroudsburg	10–0	6–0	1st (East)	
1976	East Stroudsburg	9–0–1	6–0	1st (East)	
1977	East Stroudsburg	6–2	3–2	3rd (East)	
1978	East Stroudsburg	10–1	5–0	1st (East)	
1979	East Stroudsburg	7–3	3–2	T–3rd (East)	
1980	East Stroudsburg	6–4	4–1	T–1st (East)	
1981	East Stroudsburg	4–6	3–2	T–2nd (East)	
1982	East Stroudsburg	9–2	6–0	1st (East)	
1983	East Stroudsburg	7–4	5–1	1st (East)	
1984	East Stroudsburg	5–5	3–3	4th (East)	
1985	East Stroudsburg	2–8	2–4	T–4th (East)	
1986	East Stroudsburg	1–9	1–5	T–5th (East)	
1987	East Stroudsburg	4–6	2–4	T–5th (East)	
1988	East Stroudsburg	4–6	3–3	4th (East)	
1989	East Stroudsburg	6–4	4–2	T–2nd (East)	
1990	East Stroudsburg	6–4	3–2	2nd (East)	
1991	East Stroudsburg	8–3–1	5–0–1	1st (East)	L NCAA Division II First Round
1992	East Stroudsburg	8–2	5–1	2nd (East)	
1993	East Stroudsburg	7–2–1	4–2	T–2nd (East)	
1994	East Stroudsburg	5–5	2–4	5th (East)	
1995	East Stroudsburg	4–6	3–3	4th (East)	
1996	East Stroudsburg	6–4	4–2	T–2nd (East)	
1997	East Stroudsburg	4–6	3–3	T–4th (East)	
1998	East Stroudsburg	2–8	2–4	5th (East)	
1999	East Stroudsburg	4–7	2–4	5th (East)	
2000	East Stroudsburg	6–5	3–3	4th (East)	
2001	East Stroudsburg	7–3	5–1	2nd (East)	
2002	East Stroudsburg	8–2	5–1	T–1st (East)	
2003	East Stroudsburg	8–3	5–1	T–1st (East)	
2004	East Stroudsburg	10–2	5–1	2nd (East)	L NCAA Division II Second Round
2005	East Stroudsburg	11–3	4–2	3rd (East)	L NCAA Division II Semifinal
2006	East Stroudsburg	7–4	4–1	3rd (East)	
2007	East Stroudsburg	3–6	2–3	T–3rd (East)	
2008	East Stroudsburg	9–2	5–2	3rd (East)	
2009	East Stroudsburg	8–4	4–3	5th (East)	L NCAA Division II First Round
2010	East Stroudsburg	3–8	2–5	6th (East)	
2011	East Stroudsburg	3–8	1–6	7th (East)	
2012	East Stroudsburg	5–5	4–3	T–3rd (East)	
2013	East Stroudsburg	7–4	4–3	4th (East)	
2014	East Stroudsburg	6–5	5–4	T–3rd (East)	
2015	East Stroudsburg	6–5	4–3	5th (East)	
2016	East Stroudsburg	4–7	2–5	6th (East)	
2017	East Stroudsburg	3–8	2–5	T–6th (East)	
2018	East Stroudsburg	1–8 (Note: Douds served as head coach for the first nine games of the season before retiring. Jimmy Terwilliger was appointed interim head coach and led the team for the final two games of the season. East Stroudsburg finished the year 2–9 overall and 0–6 in the East Division of Pennsylvania State Athletic Conference, placing seventh.)	0–5	(East)	
East Stroudsburg:		264–204–3	159–113–1		
Total:		264–204–3			
National championship Conference title Conference division title or championship game berth

== See also ==
- List of college football career coaching wins leaders
