= NCAA Division II women's gymnastics championships =

- Founded: 1982
- Folded: 1986
- Most championships: Jacksonville State (2)
- Website: NCAA.com

The NCAA Division II women's gymnastics championships were the annual collegiate gymnastics championships for women organised by the National Collegiate Athletic Association (NCAA) for athletes competing at universities in Division II. The championship was founded in 1982, breaking away from the championship for Division I, but ceased after the 1986 championship when it was merged back into one single national championship again after just five years.

Athlete's individual performances in the various events earned points for their institution and the team with the most points received the NCAA team title. Individual championships were also awarded in certain events. The most successful team, with two national titles, were the Jacksonville State Gamecocks.

== Results ==
NCAA Division II women's gymnastics championships
Year	Site (host team)	Championship results			
Year	Site (host team)	Champion	Points	Runner-up	Points
1982	Springfield, MA (Springfield)	Cal State Northridge	138.10	Jacksonville State	134.05
1983	Davis, CA (UC Davis)	Denver	174.80	Cal State Northridge	174.35
1984	Springfield, MA (Springfield)	Jacksonville State	173.40	SE Missouri State	171.45
1985	Springfield, MA (Springfield)	Jacksonville State (2)	176.85	SE Missouri State	173.95
1986	Colorado Springs, CO (Air Force)	Seattle Pacific	175.80	Jacksonville State	175.15

== See also ==
- NCAA women's gymnastics championships
- NCAA men's gymnastics championships
- NCAA Division II men's gymnastics championships
- NAIA women's gymnastics championships
- Pre-NCAA gymnastics champions
- List of gymnastics terms
