= NCAA Division III field hockey tournament =

US annual women's hockey competition

- Association: NCAA
- Sport: College field hockey
- Founded: 1981; 45 years ago
- Division: Division III
- No. of teams: 24
- Country: United States
- Most recent champion: Christopher Newport (1st title)
- Most titles: TCNJ (11 titles)
- Broadcaster: ESPNU
- Website: NCAA

The NCAA Division III field hockey tournament is an annual single-elimination tournament conducted by the National Collegiate Athletic Association to determine the national champion of women's Division III collegiate field hockey in the United States. The tournament has been held every year since 1981.

From 1984 to 1991, the tournament also included teams from Division II due to a lack of programs in that division (that tournament would resume in 1992).

The most successful team has been The College of New Jersey, with 11 titles.

Tufts are the defending champions, defeating Johns Hopkins in the 2025 final, 2–1 (OT).

== Format ==
Currently, 24 teams compete in each national championship tournament. The first three rounds are played at campus sites on the fields of higher-seeded teams, and the semifinal and championship rounds are held at a pre-determined site.

== Results ==
NCAA Division III field hockey tournament
Year	Site (Host Team)	Championship			Third Place Final / Semifinalists		
Year	Site (Host Team)	Champion	Score	Runner-up	Third-place	Score	Fourth-place
1981; Details	Westfield, MA (Westfield State)	Trenton State	2–0	Franklin & Marshall	Westfield State	3–2 (2OT)	Elizabethtown
1982; Details	Elizabethtown, PA (Elizabethtown)	Ithaca	2–1 (2OT, PS)	Trenton State	Franklin & Marshall	2–0	Denison
1983; Details	Ithaca, NY (Ithaca)	Trenton State (2)	2–1	Ithaca	Franklin & Marshall	1–0	Denison
1984; Details	Trenton, NJ (Trenton State)	Bloomsburg	3–2	Messiah	Ithaca, Trenton State		
1985; Details	Madison, NJ (Drew)	Trenton State (3)	1–0	Millersville	Bloomsburg	4–1	Drew
1986; Details	Trenton, NJ (Trenton State)	Salisbury State	3–2	Bloomsburg	Trenton State	1–0	Bentley
1987; Details	Geneva, NY (William Smith)	Bloomsburg (2)	1–0	William Smith	Salisbury State	1–0	Southern Maine
1988; Details	Trenton, NJ (Trenton State)	Trenton State (4)	3–2 (2OT, PS)	Bloomsburg	Salisbury State	2–0	Cortland State
1989; Details	Cortland, NY (SUNY Cortland)	Lock Haven	2–1	Trenton State	Cortland State	3–2 (2OT, PS)	St. Lawrence
1990; Details	Bloomsburg, PA (Bloomsburg)	Trenton State (5)	2–1	Bloomsburg	Messiah	2–1	Lock Haven
1991; Details	Trenton, NJ (Trenton State)	Trenton State (6)	1–0	Bloomsburg	Hartwick	3–2	Lock Haven
1992; Details	Trenton, NJ (Trenton State)	William Smith	1–0	Trenton State	Messiah	1–0 (2OT)	Salisbury State
1993; Details	Fredericksburg, VA (Mary Washington)	Cortland State	1–0	Mary Washington	Trenton State	1–0	Trinity (CT)
1994; Details	Grantham, PA (Messiah)	Cortland State (2)	2–1	Trenton State	Messiah	1–0 (OT)	Middlebury
1995; Details	Trenton, NJ (TCNJ)	Trenton State (7)	2–1	Messiah	Eastern Mennonite	3–2 (2OT)	Wellesley
1996; Details	Trenton, NJ (TCNJ)	TCNJ (8)	2–1	Hartwick	Cortland State	3–0	Lebanon Valley
1997; Details	Annville, PA (Lebanon Valley)	William Smith (2)	3–0	Cortland State	Lebanon Valley and Messiah		
1998; Details	Geneva, NY (William Smith)	Middlebury	3–2 (OT)	William Smith	Rowan and Trinity (CT)		
1999; Details	Trenton, NJ (TCNJ)	TCNJ (9)	4–1	Amherst	Cortland State and Springfield		
2000; Details	Salisbury, MD (Salisbury)	William Smith (3)	1–0	Springfield	Rowan and Salisbury		
2001; Details	Springfield, MA (Springfield)	Cortland State (3)	1–0	Messiah	TCNJ and Skidmore		
2002; Details	Springfield, MA (Springfield)	Rowan	1–0	Messiah	TCNJ and Salisbury		
2003; Details	Annville, PA (Lebanon Valley)	Salisbury (2)	4–1	Middlebury	TCNJ and Cortland State		
2004; Details	Westfield, MA (Westfield State)	Salisbury (3)	6–3	Middlebury	Middlebury and William Smith		
2005; Details	Lexington, VA (Washington & Lee)	Salisbury (4)	1–0	Messiah	Bowdoin and Ursinus		
2006; Details	Geneva, NY (William Smith)	Ursinus	3–2	Messiah	Bowdoin and Lebanon Valley		
2007; Details	Collegeville, PA (Ursinus)	Bowdoin	4–3	Middlebury	Lebanon Valley and Salisbury		
2008; Details	Collegeville, PA (Ursinus)	Bowdoin (2)	3–2 (OT)	Tufts	Messiah and Ursinus		
2009; Details	South Hadley, MA (Mount Holyoke)	Salisbury (5)	1–0	Messiah	Tufts and Ursinus		
2010; Details	Newport News, VA (Christopher Newport)	Bowdoin (3)	2–1 (2OT, PS)	Messiah	Skidmore and Urisnus		
2011; Details	Dudley, MA (Nichols)	TCNJ (10)	3–1	Middlebury	Bowdoin and Ursinus		
2012; Details	Geneva, NY (William Smith)	Tufts	2–1	Montclair State	DePauw and Mary Washington		
2013; Details	Norfolk, VA (Old Dominion)	Bowdoin (4)	1–0	Salisbury	Christopher Newport and Skidmore		
2014; Details	Lexington, VA (Washington & Lee)	TCNJ (11)	2–0	Bowdoin	Middlebury and Salisbury		
2015; Details	Lexington, VA (Washington & Lee)	Middlebury (2)	1–0	Bowdoin	TCNJ and Ursinus		
2016; Details	Geneva, NY (William Smith)	Messiah	2–1 (2OT, PS)	Tufts	Babson and Salisbury		
2017; Details	Louisville, KY (Louisville)	Middlebury (3)	4–0	Messiah	Franklin & Marshall and TCNJ		
2018; Details	Manheim, PA (MAC/CC)	Middlebury (4)	2–0	Tufts	Johns Hopkins and Rowan		
2019; Details	Manheim, PA (MAC/CC)	Middlebury (5)	1–0	Franklin & Marshall	Johns Hopkins and Salisbury		
2020	Cancelled due to COVID-19 pandemic						
2021; Details	Hartford, CT (Trinity)	Middlebury (6)	4–1	Johns Hopkins	Trinity (CT) and Rowan		
2022; Details	Glassboro, NJ (Rowan)	Middlebury (7)	1–0 (1OT)	Johns Hopkins	Rowan and Williams		
2023; Details	Newport News, VA (Christopher Newport)	Middlebury (8)	2–0	Johns Hopkins	Babson and Kean		
2024; Details	Lexington, VA (Washington & Lee)	Middlebury (9)	2–1	Tufts	Williams and Salisbury		
2025; Details	Hartford, CT (Trinity)	Tufts (2)	2–1 (2OT)	Johns Hopkins	Christopher Newport and Babson		
2026; Details	Geneva, NY (William Smith)	Christopher Newport	2–0	Middlebury	Tufts and Amherst		

== Champions ==
NCAA Division III national championships, by school: 11, 9, 5, 4, 3, 2, 1

Team	Titles	Years
TCNJ (Trenton State)	11	1981, 1983, 1985, 1988, 1990, 1991, 1995, 1996, 1999, 2011, 2014
Middlebury	9	1998, 2015, 2017, 2018, 2019, 2021, 2022, 2023, 2024
Salisbury	5	1986, 2003, 2004, 2005, 2009
Bowdoin	4	2007, 2008, 2010, 2013
Cortland	3	1993, 1994, 2001
William Smith	3	1992, 1997, 2000
Tufts	2	2012, 2025
Messiah	1	2016
Ursinus	1	2006
Rowan	1	2002
Ithaca	1	1982
Christopher Newport	1	2026

=== Former Division III members ===
Team	Titles	Years
Bloomsburg	2	1984, 1987
Lock Haven	1	1989

== See also ==
- NCAA Division I field hockey tournament
- NCAA Division II field hockey tournament
- AIAW Intercollegiate Women's Field Hockey Champions
- USA Field Hockey Hall of Fame
