= 2025 NCAA Division III field hockey tournament =

2025 NCAA Division III Field Hockey Championship

Tournament details
- Country: United States
- Venue(s): Robin Sheppard Field at Trinity College, Hartford, Connecticut
- Dates: November 21–23, 2025

Final positions
- Champions: Tufts University (2nd national title)
- Runners-up: Johns Hopkins (4th title game)

Tournament statistics
- Matches played: 27
- Goals scored: 108 (4 per match)

The 2025 NCAA Division I Field Hockey Championship was the 44th women's collegiate field hockey tournament organized by the NCAA, to determine the national champion of Division III women's college field hockey in the United States.

The semifinals and championship match were played at Robin Sheppard Field at Trinity College in Hartford, Connecticut, from November 21–23.

== Qualified Teams ==
=== Automatic qualifiers ===
Conference	Champion	Record	Appearance	Last
Atlantic East	Marywood	11–9	3rd	2024
Centennial	Johns Hopkins	19–1	15th	2024
Conference of New England	Endicott	20–1	7th	2023
Empire 8	SUNY Geneseo	20–1	5th	2024
Great Northeast Athletic Conference	Dean	16–7	1st	—N/a
Landmark	Scranton	17–3	4th	2021
Liberty League	Vassar	13–6	3rd	2021
Little East	Keene State	15–6	15th	2024
MASCAC	Westfield State	18–3	3rd	2024
MAC Commonwealth	Stevenson	19–2	1st	—N/a
NESCAC	Bates	15–3	3rd	2024
NEWMAC	Babson	20–1	10th	2024
New Jersey Athletic Conference	Rowan	16–5	25th	2024
North Coast Athletic Conference	Denison	12–6	16th	2023
Old Dominion Athletic Conference	Lynchburg	16–4	22nd	2024
SUNYAC	Salisbury	17–2	40th	2024
United East	St. Mary's (Maryland)	13–5	3rd	2024

=== At-large qualifiers ===
Team	Conference	Record	Appearance	Last
Amherst	NESCAC	8–8	6th	2011
Bowdoin	NESCAC	9–7	15th	2021
Christopher Newport	Coast to Coast Athletic Conference	17–0	14th	2024
Dickinson	Centennial	18–3	1st	—N/a
Hamilton	NESCAC	11–5	2nd	2009
Middlebury	NESCAC	12–5	25th	2024
Tufts	NESCAC	14–3	16th	2024
Wesleyan (Connecticut)	NESCAC	14–4	2nd	2024
Williams	NESCAC	8–8	15th	2024
Worcester Polytechnic Institute	NEWMAC	14–5	5th	1992

== Bracket ==
First round November 12, 2025; Campus sites
Rowan*	2
Lynchburg	3
Salisbury*	5
Denison	0
Dickinson*	3
St. Mary's (MD)	1
Stevens*	1
Amherst (SO)	2
Tufts*	11
Dean	0
Williams*	4
Vassar	0
Stevenson*	0
WPI	1
Middlebury*	6
Westfield St.	0
Endicott*	9
Keene St.	0
Bowdoin*	7
Scranton	0
Wesleyan (CT)*	7
Marywood	0
Hamilton (2OT)*	2
SUNY Genesco	1

Second round November 15, 2025; Campus sites
Chris. Newport (OT)*	2
Lynchburg	1
Salisbury	5
Dickinson	0
Bates*	1
Amherst	0
Tufts (2OT)	2
Williams	1
Johns Hopkins*	6
WPI	0
Middlebury (2OT)	3
Endicott	2
Babson*	2
Bowdoin	1
Wesleyan (CT)	1
Hamilton	0

Third round November 16, 2025; Campus sites
Chris. Newport	1
Salisbury	0
Bates	1
Tufts	3
Johns Hopkins	3
Middlebury	0
Babson	1
Wesleyan (CT)	0

Semifinals; November 21, 2025; Hartford, Connecticut; Robin Sheppard Field
Chris. Newport	0
Tufts	1
Johns Hopkins (2OT)	2
Babson	1

Championship; November 23, 2025; Hartford, Connecticut; Robin Sheppard Field
Tufts (OT)	2
Johns Hopkins	1

== See also ==
- NCAA Division I field hockey tournament
- NCAA Division II field hockey tournament
