= NCAA Division II men's gymnastics championships =

Annual collegiate gymnastics championships

NCAA Division II Men's Gymnastics Championships
- Association: NCAA
- Sport: College gymnastics
- Founded: 1968; 58 years ago
- Folded: 1984; 42 years ago
- Division: Division II
- Country: United States
- Most titles: Cal State Fullerton (3); Southern Connecticut (3); Wisconsin–Oshkosh (3)
- Website: NCAA.com

The NCAA Division II men's gymnastics championships were the annual collegiate gymnastics championships for men organised by the National Collegiate Athletic Association for athletes competing at universities in Division II. The championship was founded in 1968, breaking away from the championship for Division I, but ceased after the 1984 championship when it was merged back into one single national championship again.

Athlete's individual performances in the various events earned points for their institution and the team with the most points received the NCAA team title. Individual championships were also awarded in certain events.

The most successful teams, with three national titles each, were Cal State Fullerton, Southern Connecticut State, and Wisconsin–Oshkosh.

The final championship was won by East Stroudsburg in 1984 before the event was disbanded.

== Results ==
NCAA Division II Men's Gymnastics Championships (NCAA College Division Gymnastics Championships)
| Year | Site (Host Team) | Championship Results | | | |
| Year | Site (Host Team) | Champion | Points | Runner-up | Points |
|---|---|---|---|---|---|
| 1968; Details | Springfield, MA (Springfield) | San Fernando Valley State | 179.400 | Springfield | 178.050 |
| 1969; Details | Northridge, CA (San Fernando Valley State) | San Fernando Valley State (2) | 151.800 | Southern Connecticut State | 145.075 |
| 1970; Details | Mankato, MN (Mankato State) | Northwestern State | 160.250 | Southern Connecticut State | 159.300 |
| 1971; Details | Chicago, IL (Illinois–Chicago) | Cal State Fullerton | 158.150 | Springfield | 156.987 |
| 1972; Details | Wheaton, IL (Wheaton) | Cal State Fullerton (2) | 160.550 | Southern Connecticut State | 153.050 |
| 1973; Details | San Francisco, CA (San Francisco State) | Southern Connecticut State | 160.750 | Cal State Northridge | 158.700 |
| 1974; Details | Springfield, MA (Springfield) | Cal State Fullerton (3) | 309.800 | Southern Connecticut State | 309.400 |
| 1975; Details | Macomb, IL (Western Illinois) | Southern Connecticut State (2) | 411.650 | Illinois–Chicago | 398.800 |
| 1976; Details | Cedar Falls, IA (Northern Iowa) | Southern Connecticut State (3) | 419.200 | Illinois–Chicago | 388.850 |
| 1977; Details | Wheaton, IL (Wheaton) | Springfield | 395.950 | Cal State Northridge | 381.250 |
| 1978; Details | Northridge, CA (Cal State Northridge) | Illinois–Chicago | 406.850 | Cal State Northridge | 400.400 |
| 1979; Details | Cedar Falls, IA (Northern Iowa) | Illinois–Chicago (2) | 418.550 | Wisconsin–Oshkosh | 385.650 |
| 1980; Details | Davis, CA (UC Davis) | Wisconsin–Oshkosh | 260.550 | Chico State | 256.050 |
| 1981; Details | Oshkosh, WI (Wisconsin–Oshkosh) | Wisconsin–Oshkosh (2) | 209.500 | Springfield | 201.550 |
| 1982; Details | Springfield, MA (Springfield) | Wisconsin-Oshkosh (3) | 216.050 | East Stroudsburg | 211.200 |
| 1983; Details | Davis, CA (UC Davis) | East Stroudsburg | 258.650 | Wisconsin–Oshkosh | 257.850 |
| 1984; Details | Springfield, MA (Springfield) | East Stroudsburg (2) | 270.800 | Cortland State | 246.350 |

== Champions ==
=== Active programs ===
| Team | Titles | Years |
|---|---|---|
| Springfield | 1 | 1977 |

=== Former programs ===
| Team | Titles | Years |
|---|---|---|
| Wisconsin–Oshkosh | 3 | 1980, 1981, 1982 |
| Cal State Fullerton | 3 | 1971, 1972, 1974 |
| Southern Connecticut | 3 | 1973, 1975, 1976 |
| East Stroudsburg | 2 | 1983, 1984 |
| UIC | 2 | 1978, 1979 |
| Cal State Northridge | 2 | 1968, 1969 |
| Northwestern State | 1 | 1970 |

== See also ==
- NCAA men's gymnastics championships
- NCAA Division II women's gymnastics championships
- NCAA women's gymnastics championships
- Pre-NCAA Gymnastics Champions
