= NAIA women's gymnastics championships =

- Sport: College gymnastics
- Founded: 1981
- Folded: 1989
- Most titles: Centenary (LA) (2); Georgia College (2); Winona State (2)
- Related competitions: NCAA women's gymnastics championships

The NAIA sponsored a women's gymnastics national championships between 1981 and 1988, when it was then discontinued.

== Results ==
=== Team competition ===
NAIA gymnastics championships
Year	Site (host team)	Championship results			
Year	Site (host team)	Champion	Points	Runner-up	Points
1981; Details:	Milledgeville, GA	Georgia College	130.20	Gustavus Adolphus	128.30
1982; Details:	Milledgeville, GA	Georgia College (2)	129.05	Southern Colorado	127.40
1983; Details:	Pueblo, CO	William & Mary	137.40	Centenary (LA)	137.20
1984; Details:	Milledgeville, GA	Centenary (LA)	139.95	Winona State	138.00
1985; Details:	Minot, ND	Winona State	140.60	Centenary (LA)	138.15
1986; Details:	Eau Claire, WI	UW-Oshkosh	137.40	Minot State	136.00
1987; Details:	Hays, KS	Winona State (2)	139.30	Centenary (LA)	138.75
1988; Details:	Minot, ND	Centenary (LA) (2)	141.20	Fort Hays State	137.40

=== Individual events ===
==== All-around ====
- 1981 Kim Buron, Adams State CO
- 1982 Stacey Aberle, Minot State ND
- 1983 Cindy Greer, Tarleton State TX
- 1984 Cindy Greer, Tarleton State TX
- 1985 Jean Schuler, Winona State MN
- 1986 Mary Leivian, Wisconsin-Oshkosh
- 1987 Mary Leivian, Wisconsin-Oshkosh
- 1988 Mary Leivian, Wisconsin-Oshkosh

==== Vaulting ====
- 1981 Kim Buron, Adams State CO
- 1982 Stacey Aberle, Minot State ND
- 1983 Cindy Greer, Tarleton State TX
- 1984 Margot Todd Evans, Centenary LA
- 1985 Renae Newman, Minot State ND
- 1986 Mary Leivian, Wisconsin-Oshkosh
- 1987 Jill McCall, Centenary LA
- 1988 Renae Newman, Minot State ND

==== Uneven bars ====
- 1981 Kim Buron, Adams State CO
- 1982 Greta Sjursen, Minot State ND
- 1983 Cindy Greer, Tarleton State TX
- 1984 Cindy Greer, Tarleton State TX
- 1985 Sylvia Ponce-Sawyer, Winona State MN
- 1986 Mary Leivian, Wisconsin-Oshkosh
- 1987 Mary Leivian, Wisconsin-Oshkosh
- 1988 Melissa Thomas, Georgia College

==== Balance beam ====
- 1981 Lisa Haugen, Gustavus Adolphus MN
- 1982 Janelle Tucker, Georgia College
- 1983 Meg Miderier, Clarion PA
- 1984 Cindy Greer, Tarleton State TX
- 1985 Sylvia Ponce-Sawyer, Winona State MN
- 1986 Robin Wheeler, Minot State ND
- 1987 Mary Leivian, Wisconsin-Oshkosh
- 1988 Nicole Lastrapes, Centenary LA

==== Floor exercise ====
- 1981 Nan Johnson, Gustavus Adolphus MN
- 1982 Janelle Tucker, Georgia College and Kim Villers, Southern Colorado
- 1983 Cindy Greer, Tarleton State TX
- 1984 Margot Todd Evans, Centenary LA
- 1985 Jean Schuler, Winona State MN
- 1986 Katie Dempsey, Winona State MN
- 1987 Katie Dempsey, Winona State MN
- 1988 Mary Leivian, Wisconsin-Oshkosh

== Summary ==
=== Individual titles ===
Rank	Team	Titles
1	Wisconsin-Oshkosh	9
2	Tarleton State	7
3	Winona State	6
3	Minot State	6
4	Adams State	3
4	Centenary	3
4	Georgia College	3
5	Gustavus Adolphus	2
6	Clarion (PA)	1
6	Southern Colorado	1

== See also ==
- NCAA women's gymnastics championships
- NCAA Division II women's gymnastics championships
