= Jimmy Terwilliger =

American football player and coach

East Stroudsburg Warriors
- Title: Head coach

Personal information
- Born: 1983 or 1984 (age 42–43); East Stroudsburg, Pennsylvania, U.S.
- Listed height: 5 ft 10 in (1.78 m)
- Listed weight: 170 lb (77 kg)

Career information
- High school: East Stroudsburg South
- College: East Stroudsburg
- NFL draft: 2007: undrafted

Career history

Playing
- Minnesota Vikings (2007)*
- * Offseason or practice squad member only

Coaching
- East Stroudsburg South HS (PA) (2007–2008) Assistant coach; Pleasant Valley HS (PA) (2009–2013) Head coach; Parkland HS (PA) (2014) Assistant coach; East Stroudsburg (2015–2017) Defensive backs coach; East Stroudsburg (2018) Associate head coach; East Stroudsburg (2018) Interim head coach; East Stroudsburg (2019–present) Head coach

Awards and highlights
- Harlon Hill Trophy (2005); All-American (2003–2006); PSAC East Player of the Year (2003–2005); Other Division II Records: Games with a Touchdown Pass – 47; Consecutive Games with a Touchdown Pass – 39; Seasons Gaining 4,000 Yards of Total Offense – 2, 2004 and 2005; Seasons Gaining 3,000 Yards of Total Offense – 4, 2003–06; Games with 300 Yards of Total Offense (Career) – 23; Games with 300 Yards of Total Offense (Season) – 9, 2004 and 2005; Games with 200 Yards Passing (Career) – 43; Games with 200 Yards Passing (Season) – 14, 2005; Games with 3 TD Passes – 30; Points by a QB (Career) – 796; Points by a QB (Season) – 324, 2005

Head coaching record
- Regular season: College: 41–25 (.621)
- Postseason: College: 0–2 (.000)
- Career: College: 41–27 (.603)

Jimmy Terwilliger (born 1983 or 1984) is an American college football coach and former player. He is the head football coach for East Stroudsburg University of Pennsylvania, a position he has held since 2019. From 2009 to 2013, he was the head football coach at Pleasant Valley High School. He played college football at East Stroudsburg, winning the 2005 Harlon Hill Trophy. Terwilliger graduated from East Stroudsburg with 17 NCAA Division II records.

== College career ==
Terwilliger ended his career at East Stroudsburg University of Pennsylvania as a four-time NCAA Division II All-American by the Football Gazette and the Division II National Player of the year in 2005, winning the Harlon Hill Trophy.

2005 statistics

GP	Efficiency	Att-Cmp-Int	Pct	Yards	TD	Long	Ave/G	Rush Att	Rush Yds	Ave	Yrd/G	Rush TD
12	186.08	424–262–11	61.8	4571	50	85	326.5	127	389	3.1	27.8	4

== Coaching career ==
Terwilliger began his coaching career in 2007 as an assistant at East Stroudsburg High School South. In 2009, he was hired as the head football coach at Pleasant Valley High School. In April 2014, Terwilliger stepped down as Pleasant Valley football coach. In July 2014, Terwilliger was hired as the quarterbacks coach for Parkland High School.

== Personal life ==
Terwilliger is the son of Mike and Kim Terwilliger of East Stroudsburg, Pennsylvania. He is a graduate of East Stroudsburg High School South and East Stroudsburg University, where he received a Bachelor of Science degree in health and physical education.

On July 4, 2009, Terwilliger married Ashlee Twigg of Sayre, Pennsylvania, a first-grade teacher at Pocono Mountain East Elementary School in Swiftwater.

== Head coaching record ==
=== College ===
Year	Team	Overall	Conference	Standing	Bowl/playoffs
East Stroudsburg Warriors (Pennsylvania State Athletic Conference) (2018–present)
2018	East Stroudsburg	1–1 (Note: Dennis Douds served as head coach for the first nine games of the season before retiring. Terwilliger was appointed interim head coach and led the team for the final two games of the season. East Stroudsburg the year finished 2–9 overall and 0–6 in the East Division of Pennsylvania State Athletic Conference.)	0–1	7th (East)	
2019	East Stroudsburg	6–5	2–5	6th (East)	
2020–21	No team—COVID-19				
2021	East Stroudsburg	5–6	3–4	5th (East)	
2022	East Stroudsburg	4–7	3–4	T–5th (East)	
2023	East Stroudsburg	9–3	5–2	T–2nd (East)	L NCAA Division II First Round
2024	East Stroudsburg	10–2	6–1	2nd (East)	L NCAA Division II First Round
2025	East Stroudsburg	8–3	5–2	3rd (East)	
East Stroudsburg:		43–27	23–19		
Total:		43–27			
