= 1962 NCAA soccer tournament =

Tournament details
- Country: United States
- Venue(s): Francis Olympic Field; St. Louis, Missouri
- Teams: 8

Final positions
- Champions: Saint Louis (3rd title)
- Runners-up: Maryland
- Semifinalists: Michigan State; Springfield College

Tournament statistics
- Matches played: 7
- Goals scored: 46 (6.57 per match)

Awards
- Best player: Gerry Balassi, Saint Louis (offensive); Don Ceresia, Saint Louis (defensive)

The 1962 NCAA soccer tournament was the fourth annual tournament organized by the National Collegiate Athletic Association to determine the national champion of men's college soccer among its members in the United States.

The tournament final was played at Francis Olympic Field in St. Louis, Missouri on November 24.

Hosts Saint Louis won their third title, defeating Maryland in the championship, 4–3.

== Qualifying ==
Qualified teams
School	Record	App.	Last Bid
Hartwick College	10–1	1st	Never
Howard	6–1	1st	Never
Maryland	8–0	4th	1961
Michigan State	8–1	1st	Never
Pittsburgh	6–0–2	1st	Never
Saint Louis	9–0–1	4th	1961
Springfield College	8–2–1	1st	Never
Stanford	10–1	1st	Never

== Bracket ==
First Round
Springfield College	2
Hartwick College	1
Maryland	4
Pittsburgh	3
Stanford	3
Saint Louis	9
Howard	1
Michigan State	9

Semifinals
Springfield College	0
Maryland	5
Saint Louis	2
Michigan State	0

Championship
Maryland	3
Saint Louis	4

== See also ==
- 1962 NAIA Soccer Championship
