= Pleasant Valley High School (Pennsylvania) =

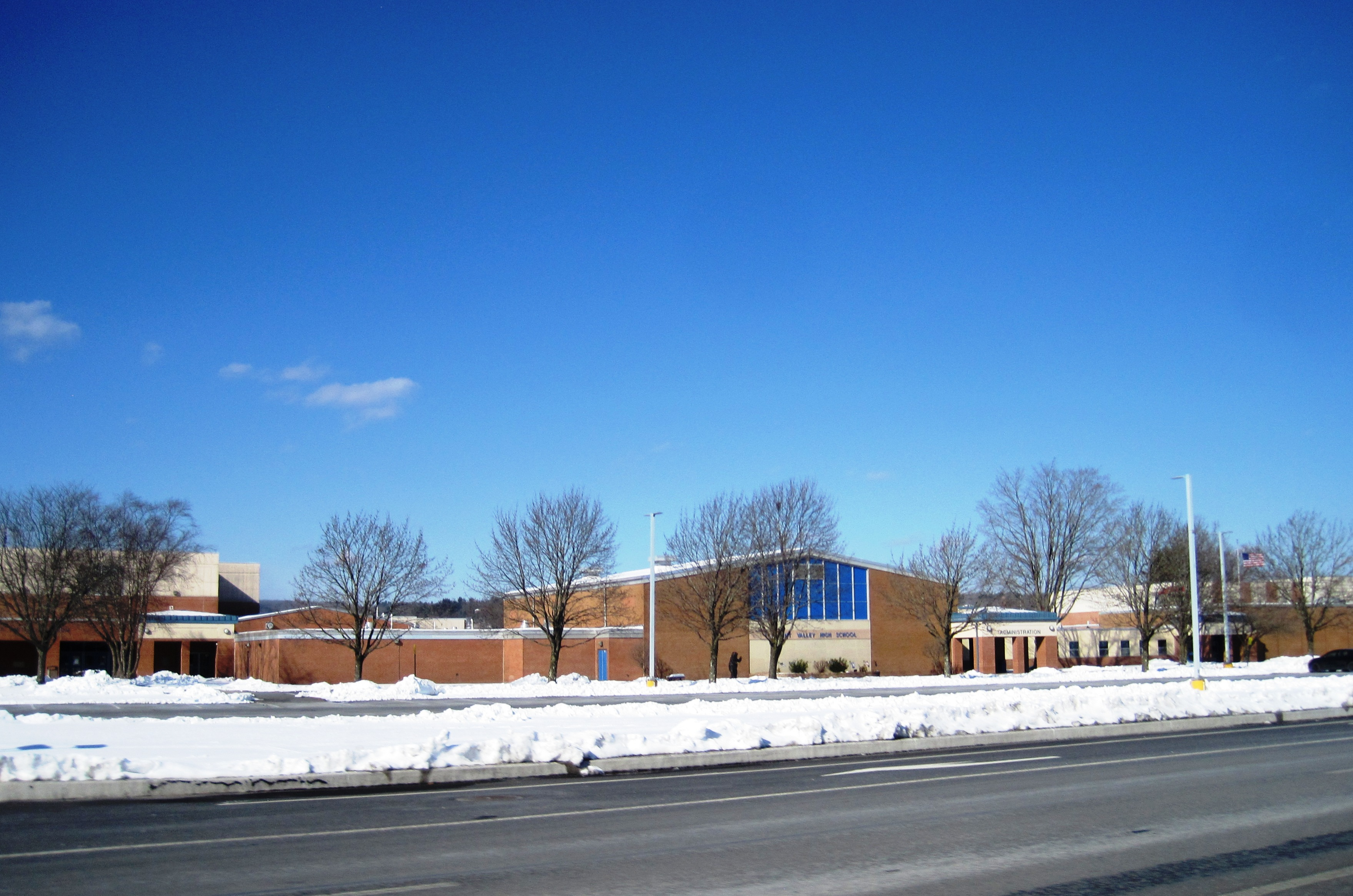

Location
- 1671 Route 209; Brodheadsville, Pennsylvania 18322; United States; 40°55′22.8″N 75°24′10.8″W

Information
- Type: Public high school
- Motto: "Excellence in Education: A Community Commitment"
- Established: 1960; 66 years ago
- School district: Pleasant Valley School District
- NCES School ID: 421929003210
- Principal: Brian Boylan
- Staff: 76.47 (on an FTE basis)
- Grades: 9-12
- Enrollment: 1,352 (2023–24)
- Student to teacher ratio: 17.68
- Colors: Blue and white
- Athletics conference: Eastern Pennsylvania Conference
- Mascot: Bear
- Rival: Pocono Mountain East High School
- Website: pvhs.pvbears.org

Pleasant Valley High School is a public high school in Brodheadsville, Pennsylvania (U.S.).

The school's name was given by its founder, John C. Mills, who took it from a common name for the area used by the locals. Pleasant Valley High School is located on U.S. Route 209. The building was built in 1960 and renovated in 2005. The school had 1,569 students as of the 2018–2019 school year.

== Arts ==
In 2010, Pleasant Valley High School Marching Band was crowned the USBands Group 4A Pennsylvania State Champions with their show "Western Portraits." The show included songs such as "The Magnificent Seven", Silverado, and Hoedown.

== Athletics ==
Pleasant Valley competes athletically in the Eastern Pennsylvania Conference (EPC) in District XI of the Pennsylvania Interscholastic Athletic Association (PIAA), one of the premier high school athletic divisions in the nation.

The district's varsity sports include:

Boys

- Baseball - AAAA
- Basketball- AAAA
- Cross Country - AAA
- Football - AAAA
- Golf - AAA
- Soccer - AAA
- Tennis - AAA
- Track and Field - AAA
- Wrestling - AAA

Girls

- Basketball - AAAA
- Cheerleading - AAAA
- Cross Country - AAA
- Field hockey - AAA
- Soccer (Fall) - AAA
- Softball - AAAA
- Tennis - AAA
- Track and Field - AAA
- Volleyball - AAA

According to PIAA directory July 2013 All of the school's teams participate in the Eastern Pennsylvania Conference.

=== Baseball ===
For over a dozen years, the baseball team was undefeated.

=== Football ===
The Pleasant Valley Football program was a major contender in the Mountain Valley Conference (MVC) for quite some time, winning the District 11 Championship in 1999 and numerous Conference Championships. Since then, they were MVC champions a few more times and continued to be a top competitor in the MVC. A new head football coach, Jimmy Terwilliger, was hired in March 2009.

Terwilliger, the former Harlon Hill Trophy winner (considered to be the Division II equivalent of the Heisman Trophy), tried to put the Bears back in the MVC race. The proudest part of Pleasant Valley Football's history is "The Old Oaken Bucket". It is an annual rivalry game between the Pocono Mountain East Cardinals and the PV Bears, which has been played since the 1960s. For 8 years, up until the 07–08 season, the Bears have kept the bucket, an individual record for the most times in a row either of the teams have had the bucket. Pleasant Valley currently holds "The Bucket" after an emotional game that came down to the last play. Pleasant Valley won 24–19. Pleasant Valley leads the series with Pocono Mountain.

=== Wrestling ===
The wrestling program is strong. During the 2002-2003 season, it was ranked top 10 in the PIAA AAA and the top 50 nationally. Two wrestlers medaled in 2010 PIAA states.
