= 1962 NAIA soccer championship =

1962 NAIA Soccer Championship

Tournament details
- Country: United States
- Teams: 4

Final positions
- Champions: East Stroudsburg State (1st title)
- Runners-up: Pratt (NY)

Tournament statistics
- Matches played: 4
- Goals scored: 17 (4.25 per match)

Awards
- Best player: Walt Schmotolocha, Pratt

The 1962 NAIA Soccer Championship was the fourth annual tournament held by the NAIA to determine the national champion of men's college soccer among its members in the United States.

East Stroudsburg State defeated Pratt in the final, 4–0, to win their first NAIA national title.

The final was played at Earlham College in Richmond, Indiana.

== Bracket ==
First Round
East Stroudsburg State	5
Park (MO)	0
Pratt (NY)	2
Castleton State	1

Championship; Richmond, IN
East Stroudsburg State	4
Pratt (NY)	0
Third Place
Park (MO)	2
Castleton State	3

== See also ==
- 1962 NCAA soccer tournament
