= NCAA Division II field hockey tournament =

- Founded: 1981; 45 years ago
- Region: United States
- Teams: 8
- Current champions: Shippensburg (6th)
- Most championships: Bloomsburg (13)
- Broadcaster: ESPNU
- Website: NCAA.com

The NCAA Division II field hockey tournament is an annual single-elimination tournament conducted by the National Collegiate Athletic Association to determine the national champion of women's Division II collegiate field hockey in the United States. The tournament was held from 1981 and 1983, discontinued from 1984 and 1991, was re-instated in 1992, and has been held every year since.

Between 1984 and 1991, Division II teams competed in the NCAA Division III Field Hockey Championship.

The most successful team are the Bloomsburg Huskies, with thirteen titles. Shippensburg are the current champions, winning their sixth national title in 2025.

Teams from Pennsylvania have historically dominated the tournament. Aside from 1981, every year that small college championships have been conducted (AIAW: 1979 to 1981, NCAA: 1981 to 2012), one or more teams from Pennsylvania have played in either or both Division II and Division III national title games, winning 29 of 38 such games.

== Format ==
Currently, eight teams compete in each national championship tournament. The first round is typically played on the campus of the higher-seeded teams, and the semifinal and championship rounds are held at a pre-determined site.

== Results ==
NCAA Division II field hockey tournament
Year	Site (Host Team)	Championship Results		
Year	Site (Host Team)	Champion	Score	Runner-up
1981; Details	Misenheimer, NC (Pfeiffer)	Pfeiffer	5–3	Bentley
1982; Details	Bloomsburg, PA (Bloomsburg)	Lock Haven	4–1	Bloomsburg
1983; Details	Lock Haven, PA (Lock Haven)	Bloomsburg	1–0	Lock Haven
1984–1991	Not held			
1992; Details	Lock Haven, PA (Lock Haven)	Lock Haven (2)	3–1	Bloomsburg
1993; Details	Bloomsburg, PA (Bloomsburg)	Bloomsburg (2)	2–1 (2 OTPS)	Lock Haven
1994; Details	Lock Haven, PA (Lock Haven)	Lock Haven (3)	2–1	Bloomsburg
1995; Details	Lock Haven, PA (Lock Haven)	Lock Haven (4)	1–0	Bloomsburg
1996; Details	Lock Haven, PA (Lock Haven)	Bloomsburg (3)	1–0	Lock Haven
1997; Details	Bloomsburg, PA (Bloomsburg)	Bloomsburg (4)	2–0	Kutztown
1998; Details	Lock Haven, PA (Lock Haven)	Bloomsburg (5)	4–3 (OT)	Lock Haven
1999; Details	Bloomsburg, PA (Bloomsburg)	Bloomsburg (6)	2–0	Bentley
2000; Details	Lock Haven, PA (Lock Haven)	Lock Haven	2–0	Bentley
2001; Details	Waltham, MA (Bentley)	Bentley	4–2	East Stroudsburg
2002; Details	Lock Haven, PA (Lock Haven)	Bloomsburg (7)	5–0	Bentley
2003; Details	Lowell, MA (UMass Lowell)	Bloomsburg (8)	4–1	UMass Lowell
2004; Details	Lowell, MA (UMass Lowell)	Bloomsburg (9)	3–2 (OT)	Bentley
2005; Details	Shippensburg, PA (Shippensburg)	UMass Lowell	2–1 (2OT)	Bloomsburg
2006; Details	Pensacola, FL	Bloomsburg (10)	2–1	Bentley
2007; Details	Lowell, MA (UMass Lowell)	Bloomsburg (11)	5–2	UMass Lowell
2008; Details	Bloomsburg, PA (Bloomsburg)	Bloomsburg (12)	6–2	UMass Lowell
2009; Details	North Easton, MA (Stonehill)	Bloomsburg (13)	3–2	UMass Lowell
2010; Details	Louisville, KY (Bellarmine)	UMass Lowell (2)	1–0	Shippensburg
2011; Details	Bloomsburg, PA (Bloomsburg)	West Chester	2–1	UMass Lowell
2012; Details	Lowell, MA (UMass Lowell)	West Chester (2)	5–0	UMass Lowell
2013; Details	Norfolk, VA (Old Dominion)	Shippensburg	2–1 (OT)	LIU Post
2014; Details	Louisville, KY (Bellarmine)	Millersville	1–0	LIU Post
2015; Details	Bloomsburg, PA (Bloomsburg)	East Stroudsburg	1–0	Merrimack
2016; Details	North Easton, MA (Stonehill)	Shippensburg (2)	2-1	LIU Post
2017; Details	Louisville, KY (Bellarmine)	Shippensburg (3)	4–1	LIU Post
2018; Details	Pittsburgh, PA (Duquesne)	Shippensburg (4)	1–0	East Stroudsburg
2019; Details	Millersville, PA (Millersville)	West Chester (3)	2–1	Saint Anselm
2020	Cancelled due to COVID-19 pandemic			
2021; Details	Millersville, PA (Millersville)	Shippensburg (5)	3–0	West Chester
2022; Details	Seattle, WA (Seattle Pacific)	East Stroudsburg (2)	1–0	Shippensburg
2023; Details	Manchester, NH (Saint Anselm)	Kutztown	2–1	East Stroudsburg
2024; Details	Gaffney, SC (Limestone)	Saint Anselm	1–0	Kutztown
2025; Details	Bloomsburg, PA (Bloomsburg)	Shippensburg	3–2 (OT)	Newberry
2026	Kansas City, MO (Pembroke Hill)			
2027	Wingate, NC (Wingate)			

== Champions ==
NCAA Division II National Championships by school: 13, 6, 5, 2, 1

School	Titles	Years
Bloomsburg	13	1983, 1993, 1996, 1997, 1998, 1999, 2002, 2003, 2004, 2006, 2007, 2008, 2009
Shippensburg	6	2013, 2016, 2017, 2018, 2021, 2025
Lock Haven	5	1982, 1992, 1994, 1995, 2000
East Stroudsburg	2	2015, 2022
Saint Anselm	1	2024
Kutztown	1	2023
Millersville	1	2014
Bentley	1	2001

=== Former Division II ===
School	Titles	Years
UMass Lowell	2	2005, 2010
Pfeiffer	1	1981

== See also ==
- NCAA Division I field hockey tournament
- NCAA Division III field hockey tournament
- AIAW Intercollegiate Women's Field Hockey Champions
- USA Field Hockey Hall of Fame
