= Millersville Marauders =

Athletic teams of Millersville University of Pennsylvania

- University: Millersville University of Pennsylvania
- NCAA: Division II
- Conference: Pennsylvania State Athletic Conference (PSAC)
- Athletic director: Kate Corcoran
- Location: Millersville, Pennsylvania
- Varsity teams: 18
- Football stadium: Chryst Field at Biemesderfer Stadium
- Basketball arena: Pucillo Gymnasium
- Baseball stadium: Bennett J. Cooper Park
- Softball stadium: Seaber Softball Stadium
- Soccer stadium: Pucillo Field
- Nickname: Marauders
- Colors: Black and gold
- Mascot: The Marauder and Skully the Parrot
- Website: millersvilleathletics.com
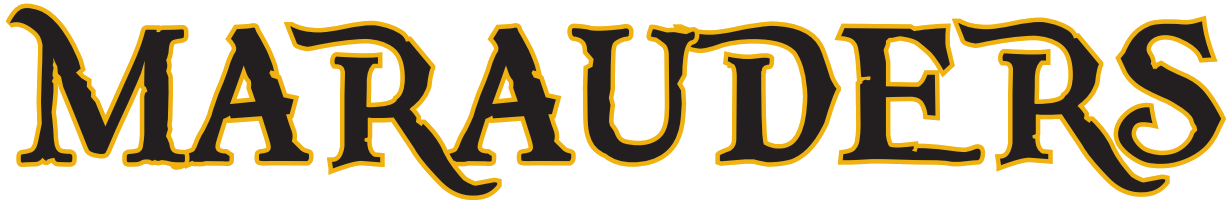

The Millersville Marauders are the athletic teams that represent Millersville University of Pennsylvania, located in Millersville, Pennsylvania, in NCAA Division II intercollegiate sports.

The Marauders are members of the Pennsylvania State Athletic Conference (PSAC) for all eighteen varsity sports. Millersville have been members of the PSAC since its foundation in 1951.

== Varsity teams ==
=== List of teams ===
Men's sports (7)

- Baseball
- Basketball
- Golf
- Football
- Soccer
- Tennis
- Wrestling

Women's sports (11)

- Basketball
- Cross country
- Field hockey
- Golf
- Lacrosse
- Soccer
- Softball
- Swimming and diving
- Tennis
- Track and field
- Volleyball

Phil Walker played basketball for the Millersville Marauders. He was a member of world champion 1977–78 Washington Bullets.

Chas McCormick played baseball for the Millersville Marauders. McCormick set Millersville career records in hits, runs, RBIs, and triples, became the Pennsylvania State Athletic Conference's all-time hits leader, was named All-PSAC East four times, was named the PSAC East Athlete of the Year, and was named an All-American.

== National championships ==
=== Team ===
Sport	Association	Division	Year	Opponent/Runner-up	Score
Men's cross country (1)	NCAA	Division II	1981	Edinboro	97–99 (-2)
Field hockey (1)	NCAA	Division II	2014	LIU Post	1–0

== Club sports ==
=== Ice Hockey (D2) ===
Program started in 1978, competing in the American College Hockey Association (ACHA) Division 2. Members of the DVCHC (1991–1999), MACH, GNCHC (2009–2014), CSCHC (2014–present)

- 1991-1992 DVCHC Co-Champions; ranked #8 nationally in ACHA rankings #1
- 1992-1993 DVCHC Champions; ACHA National Tournament invitation hosted by Iowa State University, but unable to participate
- 1993-1994 DVCHC Regular Season Champions; DVCHC Runner-Up; ranked #8 in ACHA national rankings (ranking #1 of the season); ranked #4 in ACHA national rankings (mid-season ranking); ranked #10 in ACHA national rankings (final of the season); ACHA National Tournament participant hosted by Siena College; March 9-12-1994; Pool D-Millersville, Southern Connecticut State, Calvin College. Others at nationals- Ferris State(champions), Drexel, Tennessee, Colorado State(Runner-up), Liberty, Siena, Kentucky, Illinois, Stanford.
- 1994-1995 DVCHC Champions
- 1996-1997 DVCHC Runner-Up
- 1998-1999 DVCHC Runner-Up
- 1999-2000 ranked #9 in ACHA North East region
- 2001-2002 ranked #14 in ACHA North East region
- 2011–2012 GNCHC Runner-up; GNCHC Western Division Champions; GNCHC Regular Season Champions
- 2012-2013 GNCHC Runner-Up
- 2013-2014 GNCHC Regular Season Champions; GNCHC Runner-Up
- 2014-2015 season: received ranking votes in final ranking period in ACHA South East Region; CSCHC Regular Season Champions
- 2015-2016 season: received ranking votes in final ranking period in ACHA South East Region
- 2018-2019 season: ranked #17 in ACHA southeast region (ranking period #2), #18 in ACHA southeast region (ranking period #1
- 2019-2020 season: ranked #14 in ACHA southeast region (ranking period #1)
- 2021-2022 season: #18 ACHA southeast (ranking period 1), #19 southeast region (ranking period 2), #13 southeast (ranking period 3), #17 southeast (ranking period 4), #20 southeast (ranking period 5), #16 southeast (ranking period 6), #19 southeast (ranking period 7), #18 southeast (ranking period 8), #18 southeast (ranking period 9), #20 southeast (final ranking period)
- 2022-2023 season: #15 ACHA southeast (ranking period 1) #15 (period 2), #12 (period 3), #16 (period 4), #15 (period 5), #18 (period 6), #18 (period 7), #17 (period 8), #17 (final ranking period); CSCHC playoff Runner-Up
- 2023-2024 season: CSCHC Regular Season Champions, CSCHC playoff Runner-Up
- 2024-2025 season: CSCHC Regular Season Champions, CSCHC Playoff Champions, ranked #22 in Northeast region (ranking period #8)
- 2025-2026 season: CSCHC playoff Runner-Up

All Americans

- 2012-2013- Northeast region First team Defense-Sean Nielsen
- 2015-2016- Andrew Quintois- ACHA Division 2 Academic All- American
- 2018-2019- ACHA D2 Academic All Americans, Cody Leisey and Kyle Milosek
- 2022-2023- Southeast Region Second Team, Forward- Cole McCulley
- 2025-2026- Northeast Region Third Team, Defense- Thor Martin

=== Ice Hockey (D3) ===
Established 2021

- 2021-2022-ranked #10 week #9 of Atlantic region, ranked #9 in Atlantic region in week 10 rankings, ranked #11 in Atlantic region in week 17 rankings, ranked #10 week 19 of Atlantic region, ranked #10 week 21 of Atlantic region, playing in the DVCHC, part of the College Hockey Federation (CHF)
- 2022-2023- ACHA D3 independent, ranked #88 in both 7th and final(8th) ranking periods
- 2023-2024- ACHA ACCHL D3 Elite - North Division
- 2024-2025- ACHA ACCHL D3 Premier - North Division

=== Baseball ===
- 2018-2019 NCBA Division 3 District 1 South Champions
- 2018-2019 NCBA Division 3 World Series Champions
- 2019-2020 season: moved to NCBA Division 2
- 2019-2020 season: ranked #15 in NCBA national poll.

=== Men's Running Club ===
- Previously Men's Cross Country - 1981 Division II National Champions) (and Track & Field)

== Individual sports ==
=== Field hockey ===
- 2014 Division II National Champions

=== Lacrosse ===
- 1982 AIAW Division III national champion

== Gallery ==
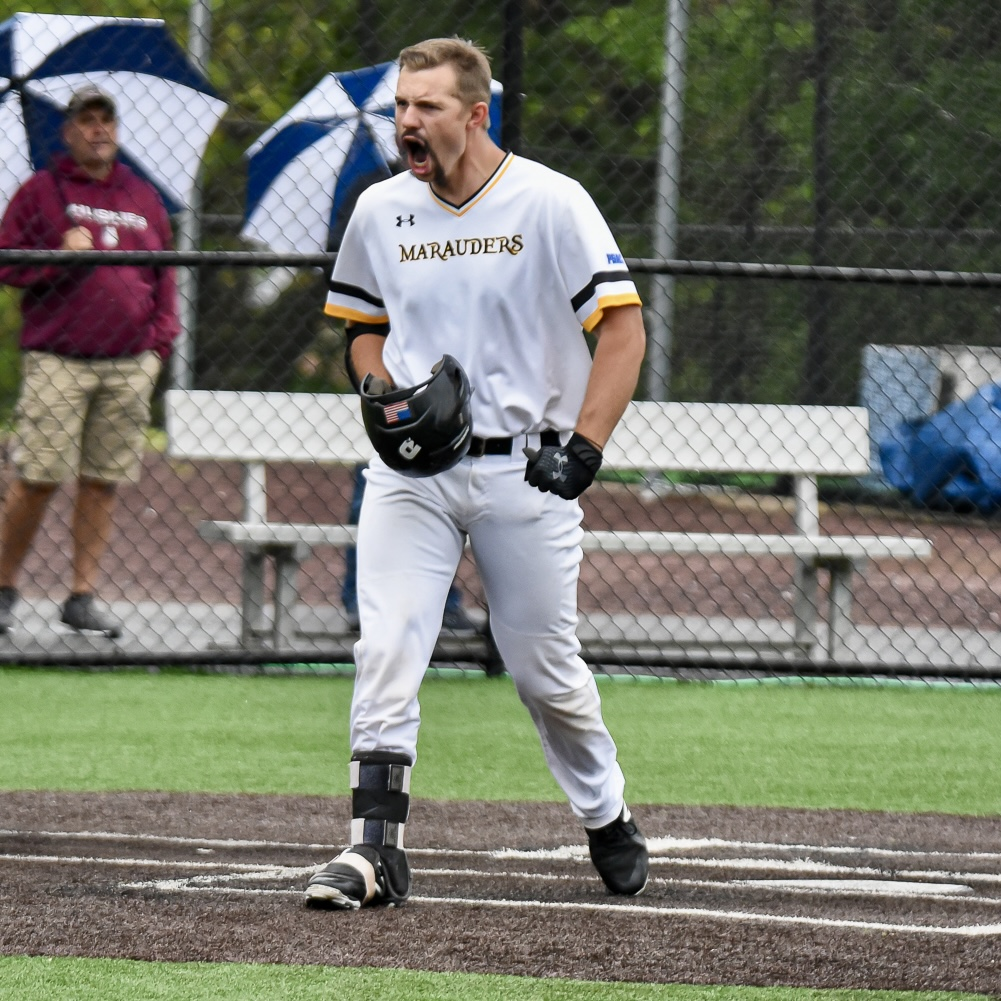
A Marauders baseball game in 2021

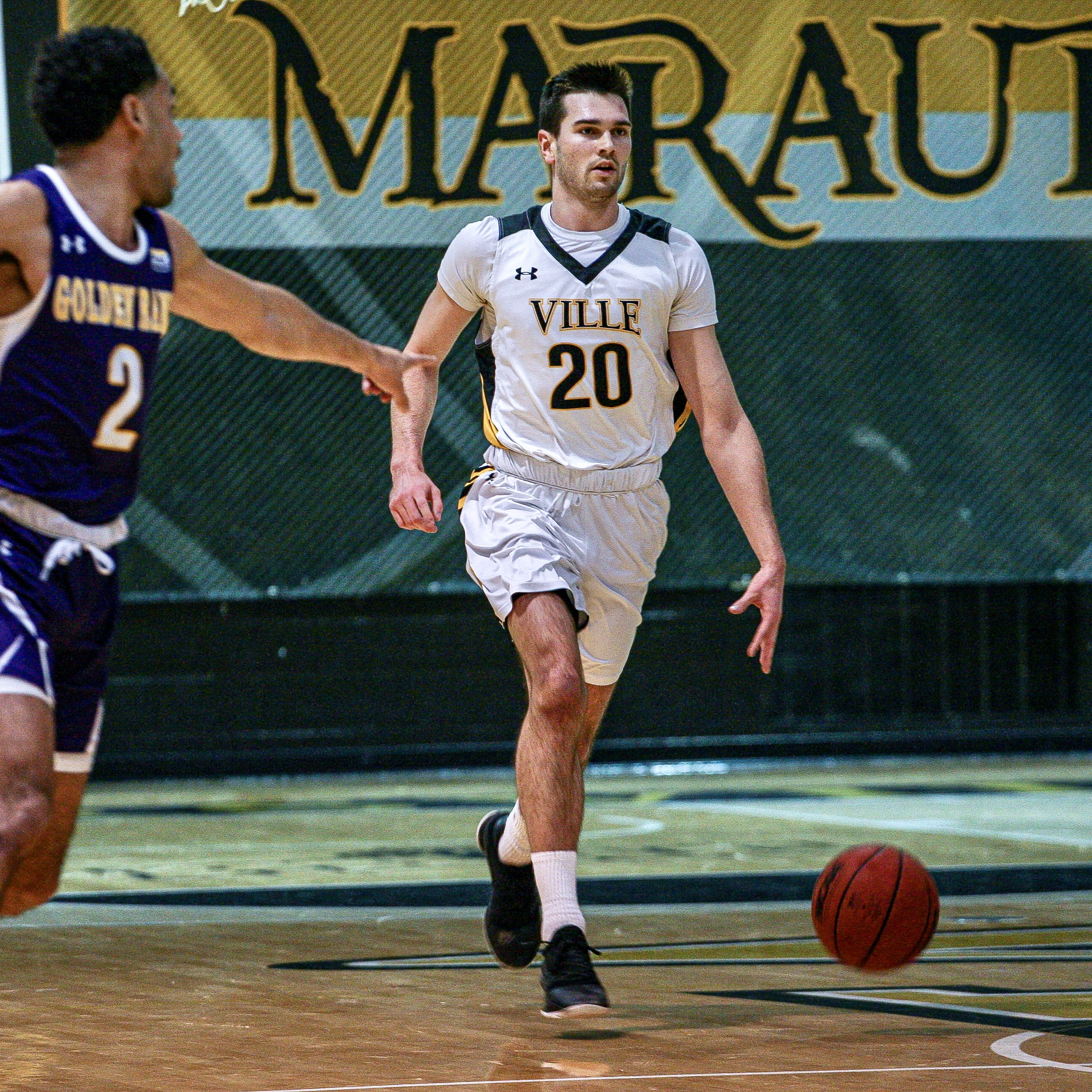
A Marauders men's basketball game in 2020

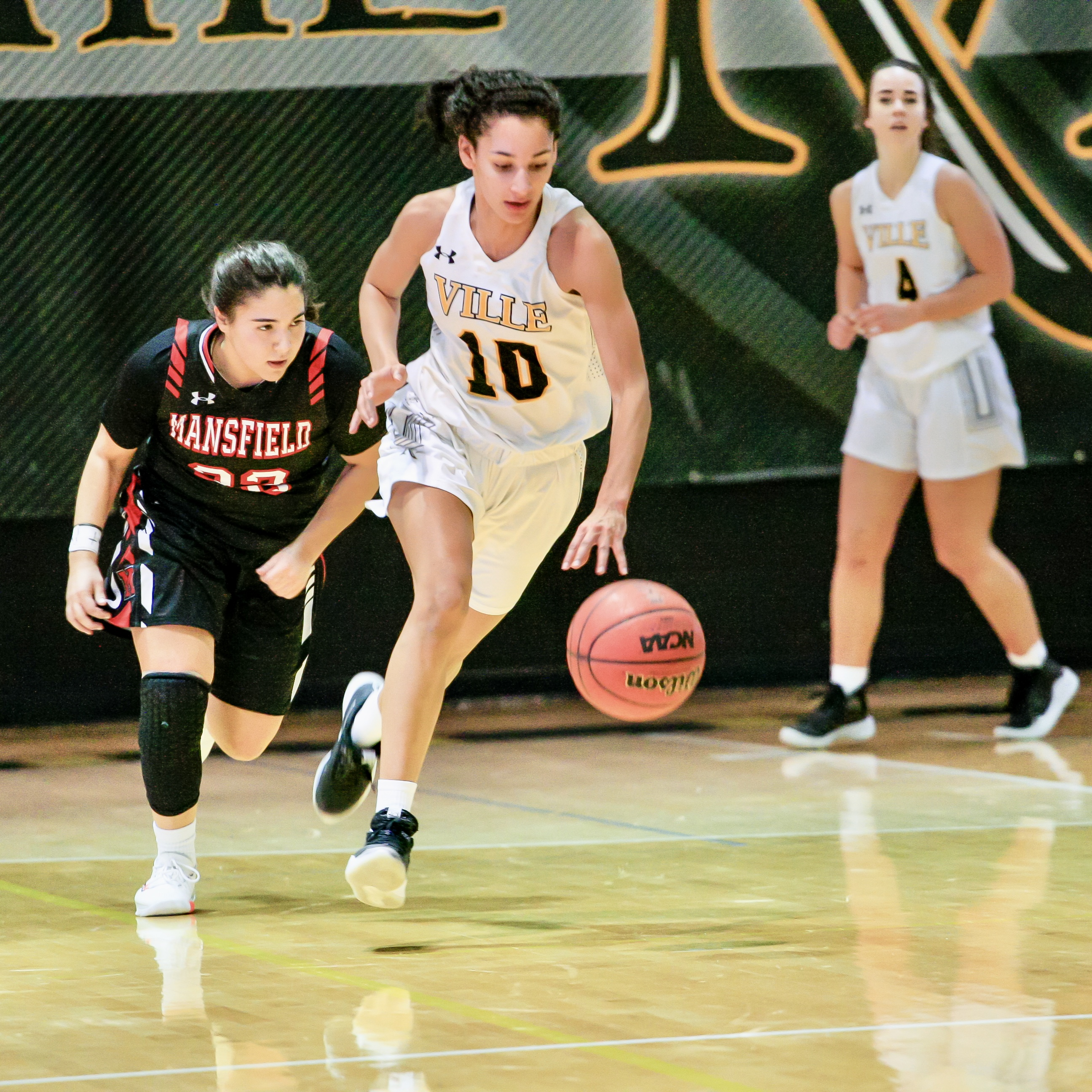
A Marauders women's basketball game in 2020

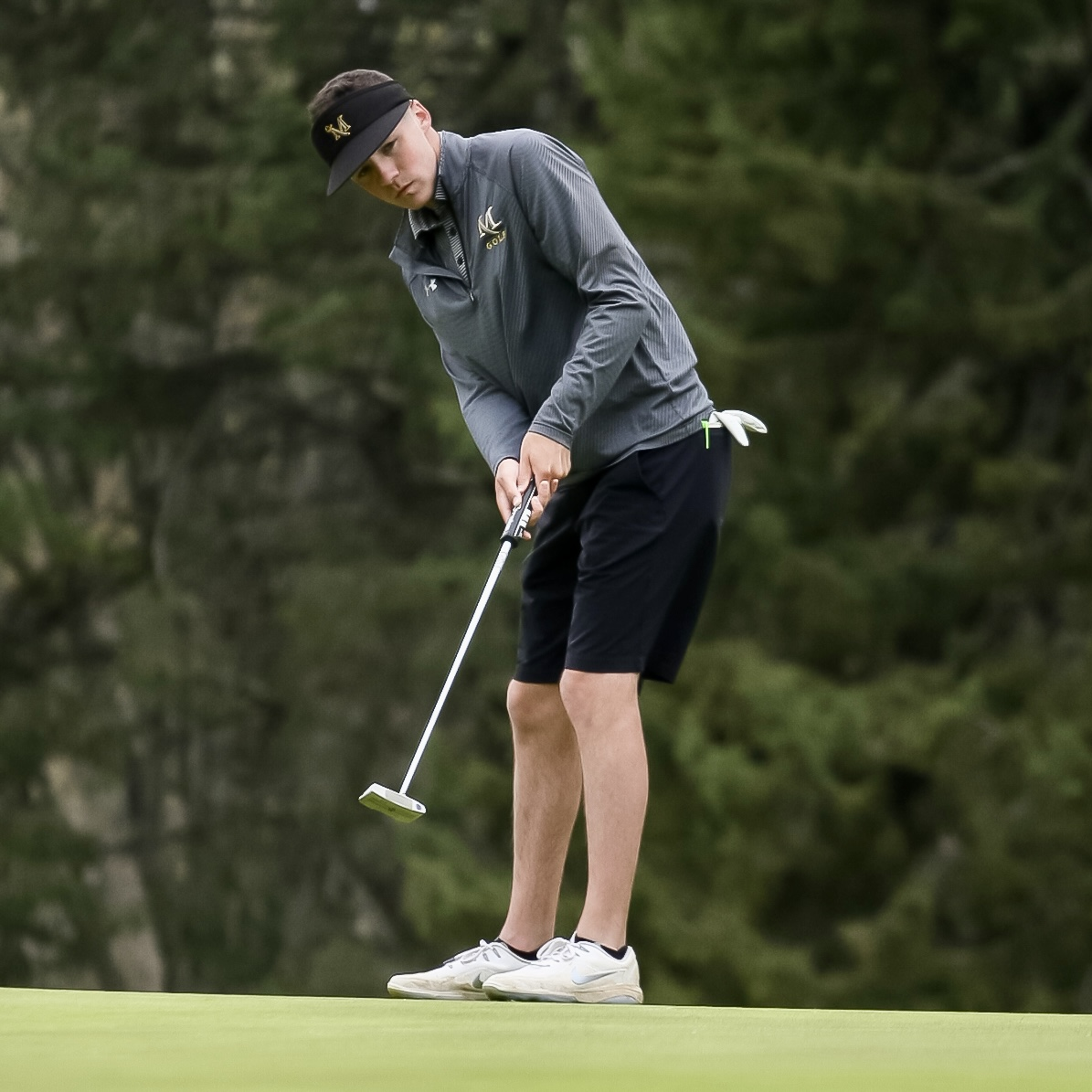
A Marauders golfer in 2021

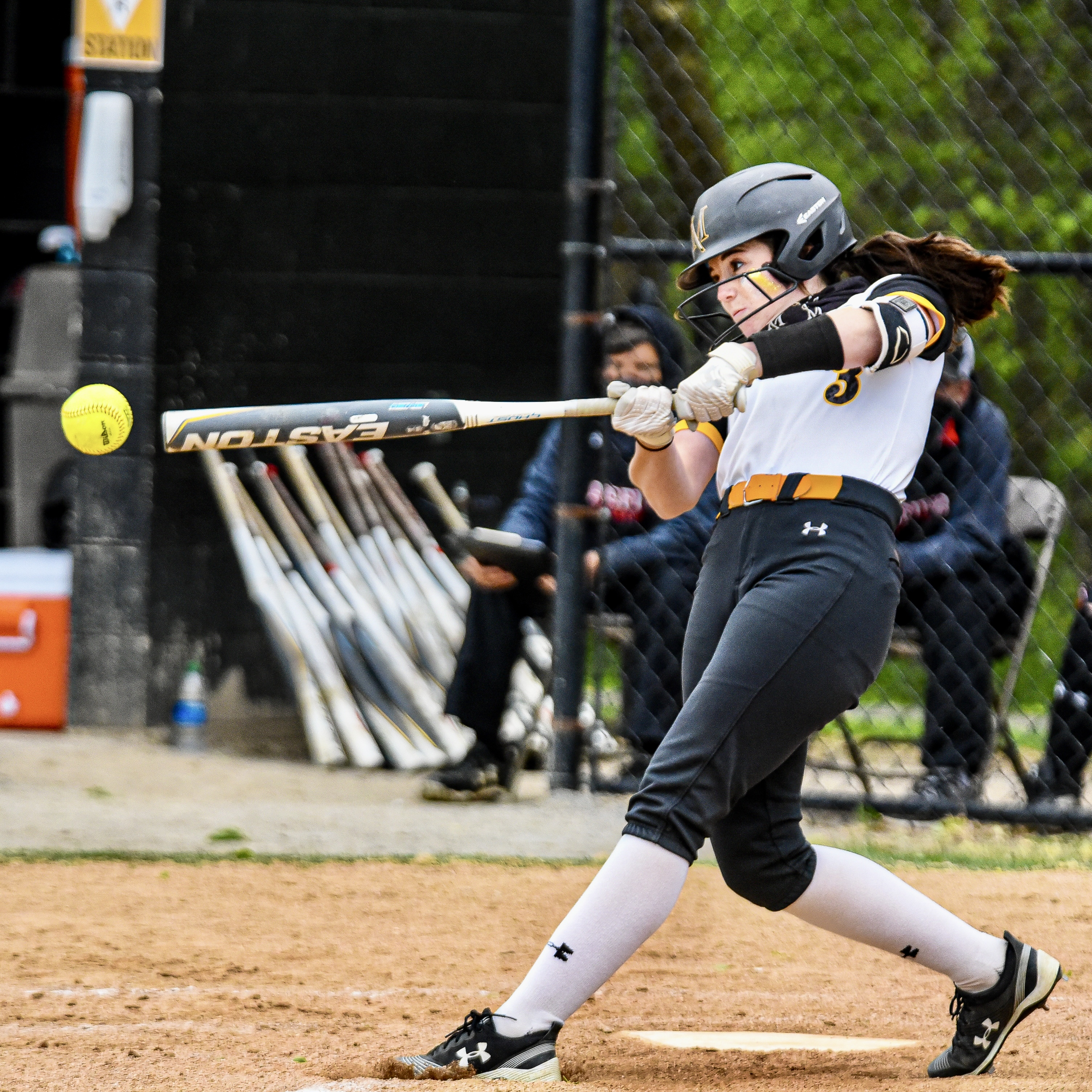
A Marauders softball game in 2021

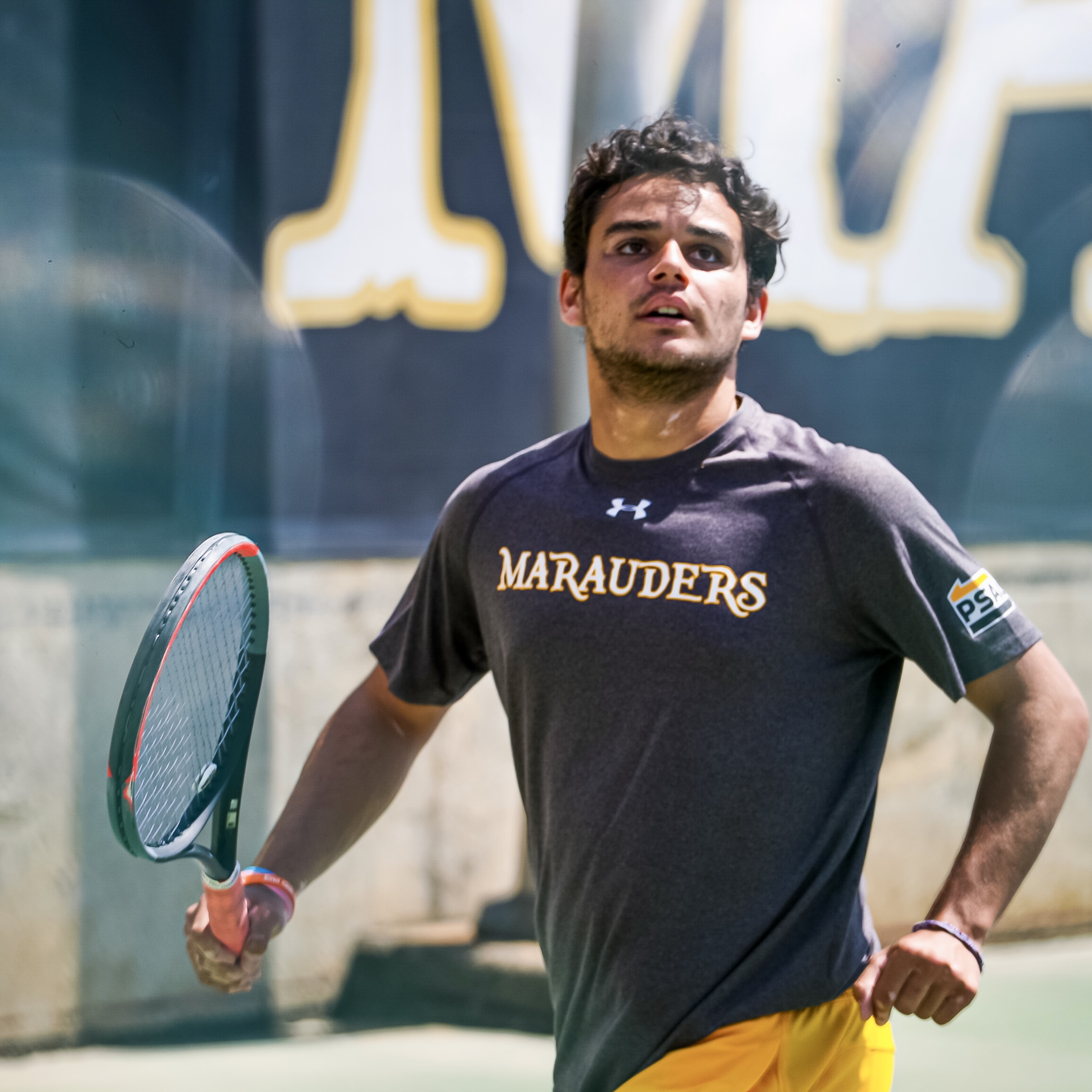
A Marauders men's tennis match in 2021

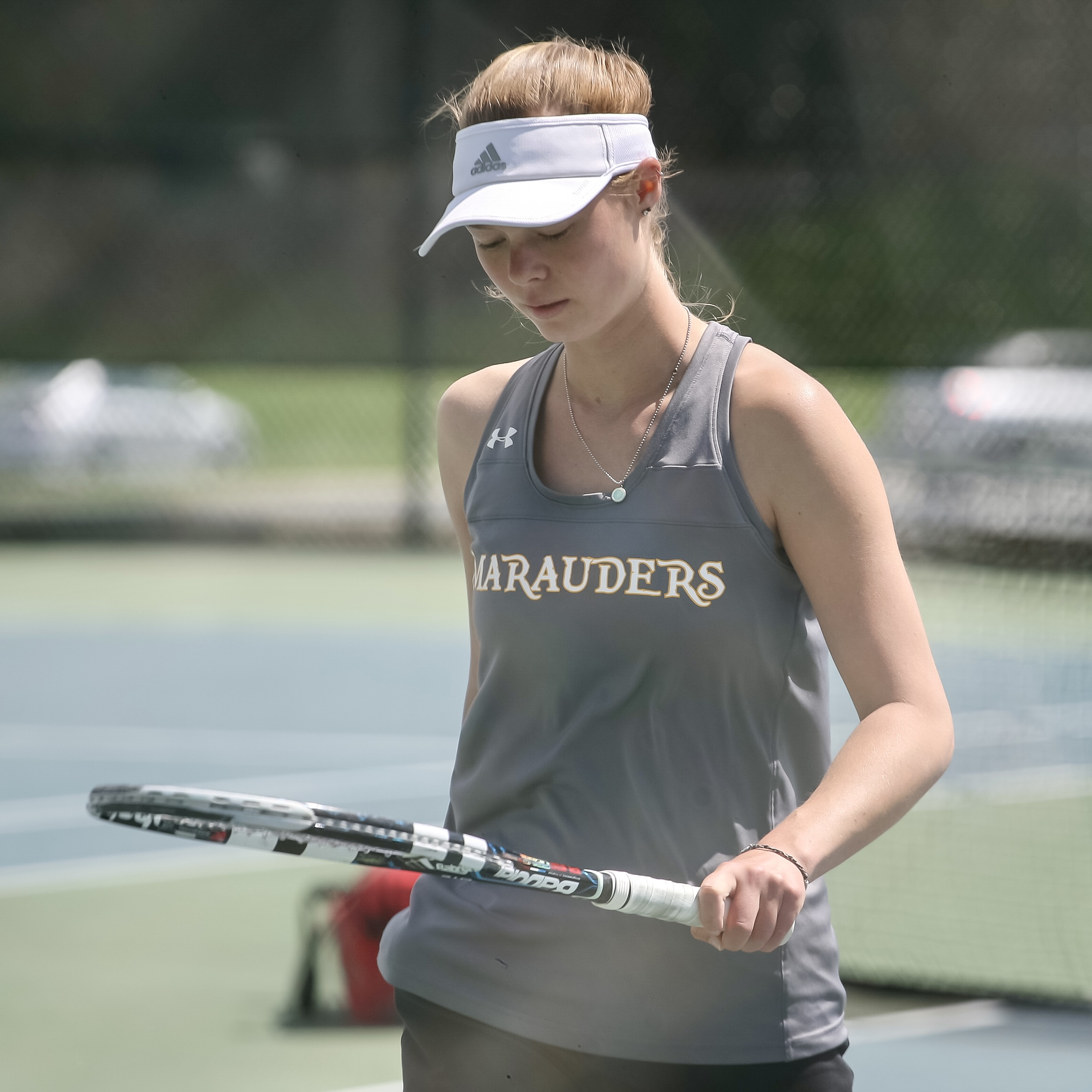
A Marauders women's tennis match in 2021

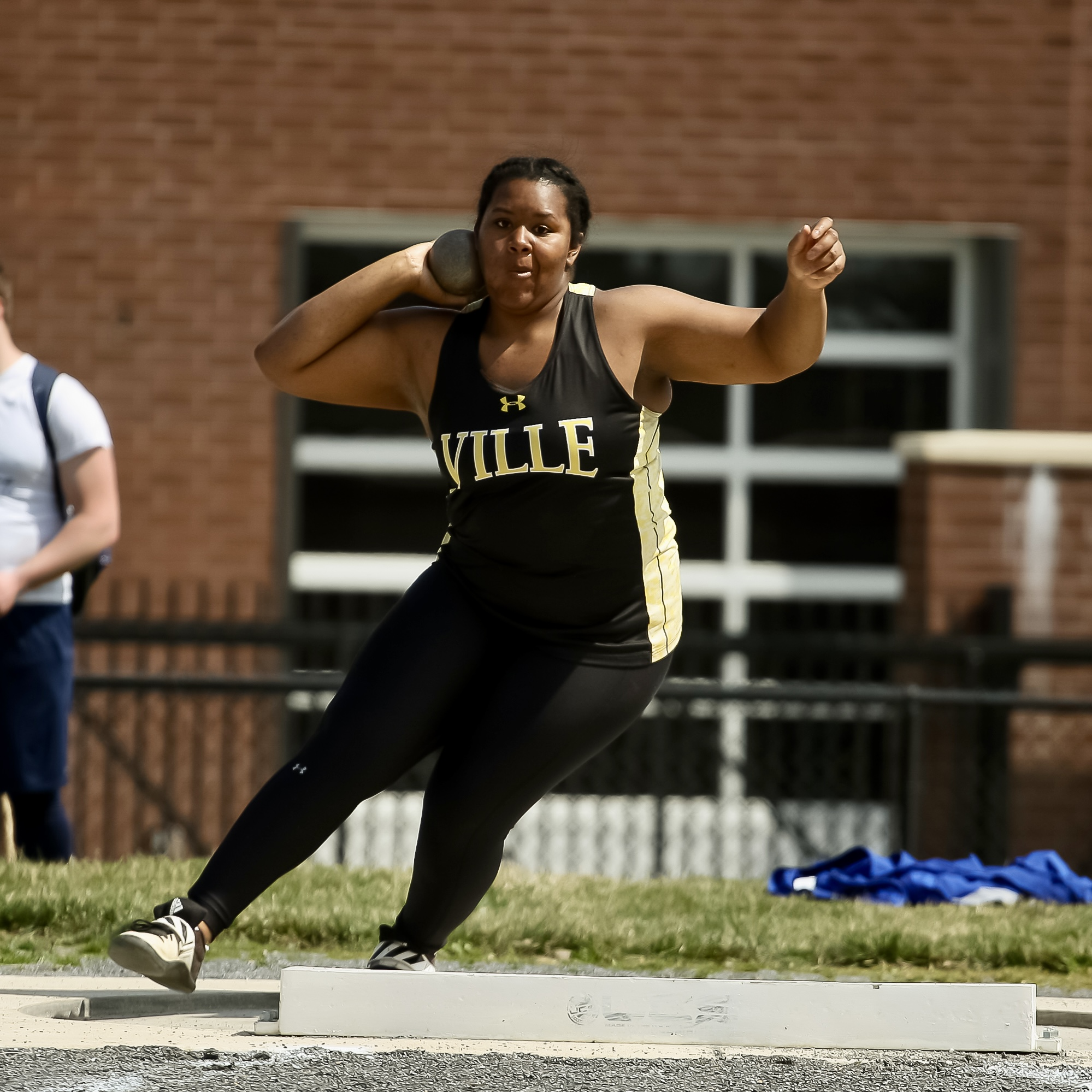
A Marauders women's shot putter during a track meet in 2021
