= East Stroudsburg Warriors =

Intercollegiate sports teams of East Stroudsburg University of Pennsylvania

- University: East Stroudsburg University of Pennsylvania
- Nickname: Warriors
- NCAA: Division II
- Conference: PSAC
- Athletic director: Dr. Allen G. Snook, Jr.
- Location: East Stroudsburg, Pennsylvania
- Varsity teams: 20 (7 men's, 13 women's)
- Football stadium: Eiler-Martin Stadium
- Basketball arena: Koehler Fieldhouse
- Baseball stadium: Hughes Field
- Softball stadium: Zimbar Field
- Lacrosse stadium: Whitenight Field
- Tennis venue: Wolbers Courts
- Colors: Red and black
- Website: esuwarriors.com
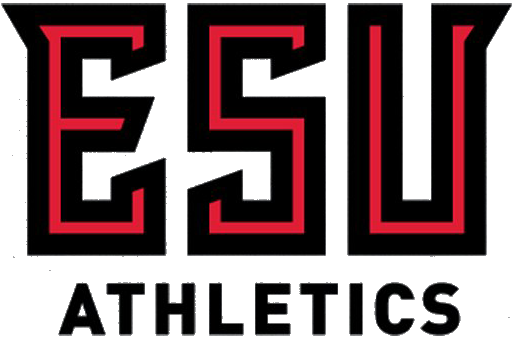

The East Stroudsburg Warriors are the athletic teams that represent East Stroudsburg University of Pennsylvania, located in East Stroudsburg, Pennsylvania, in NCAA Division II intercollegiate sports.

The Warriors are members of the Pennsylvania State Athletic Conference (PSAC) for all eighteen varsity sports and have been members of the PSAC since its foundation in 1951.

== Varsity teams ==
=== List of teams ===
Men's sports (7)

- Baseball
- Basketball
- Cross country
- Football
- Soccer
- Track and field
- Wrestling

Women's sports (11)

- Basketball
- Cross country
- Field hockey
- Golf
- Lacrosse
- Soccer
- Softball
- Swimming and diving
- Tennis
- Track and field
- Volleyball

== National championships ==
=== Team ===
Sport	Association	Division	Year	Runner-up	Score
Field hockey (1)	NCAA	Division II	2015	Merrimack	1–0
Men's soccer (1)	NAIA	Single	1962	Pratt	4–0

== Individual sports ==
=== Basketball ===
In 2018 the men's basketball team advanced to the Elite 8 quarterfinals.

=== Field hockey ===
- East Stroudsburg's 2001 women's field hockey team finished runner-up for the NCAA Division II Field Hockey Championship.
- East Stroudsburg's 2015 women's field hockey team won the NCAA Division II Field Hockey Championship.

=== Football ===
- East Stroudsburg's 2005 football team got to the Division II semi-finals & quarterback Jimmy Terwilliger won the Harlon Hill Trophy.
- James Franklin, the Head Coach of Virginia Tech, was quarterback from 1991 to 1994.

=== Gymnastics ===
- East Stroudsburg won the 1983 & 1984 NCAA Division II Men's Gymnastics Championships (runner-up in 1982, fifth place in 1981).
- East Stroudsburg won the 1985 Eastern Intercollegiate Gymnastics League championship (runner-up in 1984, third place in 1983).

=== Men's soccer ===
- East Stroudsburg won the 1962 NAIA national men's soccer championship.
- East Stroudsburg's 1972 men's soccer team produced Division I All-American goalkeeper Bob Rigby.

=== Softball ===
- East Stroudsburg's softball team appeared in two Women's College World Series in 1975 and 1976.

== Other sports ==
- East Stroudsburg's 2000 women's rugby team finished runner up for the rugby.
- East Stroudsburg's 2009 women's rugby team finished runner up for the NSCRO.
- East Stroudsburg's club archery team won numerous national collegiate team championships bestowed by the National Archery Association over an era extending into the 1970s.
