= 2012 IUP Crimson Hawks football team =

American college football season

2012 IUP Crimson Hawks football

PSAC champion PSAC West Division champion

PSAC Championship Game, W 41–10 vs. Shippensburg

NCAA Division II Quarterfinal, L 17–21 vs. Winston-Salem State
- Conference: Pennsylvania State Athletic Conference
- West Division

Ranking
- AFCA: No. 7
- Record: 12–2 (6–1 PSAC)
- Head coach: Curt Cignetti (2nd season)
- Offensive coordinator: Luke Getsy (2nd season)
- Defensive coordinator: Paul Tortorella (18th season)
- Home stadium: Miller Stadium

2012 Pennsylvania State Athletic Conference football standings
	Conf.			Overall
Team	W		L	W		L
East
No. 14 Shippensburg xy^	7	–	0	11	–	2
No. 17 Bloomsburg ^	6	–	1	10	–	2
West Chester	4	–	3	7	–	4
East Stroudsburg	4	–	3	5	–	5
Kutztown	4	–	3	7	–	4
LIU Post	2	–	5	3	–	7
Millersville	1	–	6	2	–	9
Cheyney	0	–	7	1	–	10
West
No. 7 IUP xy$^	6	–	1	12	–	3
Mercyhurst x	6	–	1	9	–	2
California (PA)	5	–	2	8	–	3
Slippery Rock	5	–	2	6	–	5
Edinboro	3	–	4	4	–	6
Clarion	2	–	5	4	–	7
Gannon	1	–	6	3	–	8
Lock Haven	0	–	7	1	–	10
Championship: IUP 41, Shippensburg 10
$ – Conference champion; x – Division champion/co-champions; y – Championship game participant; ^ – NCAA Division II playoff participant; Rankings from AFCA poll

The 2012 IUP Crimson Hawks football team was an American football team that represented Indiana University of Pennsylvania (IUP) of Indiana, Pennsylvania, as a member of the Pennsylvania State Athletic Conference (PSAC) West Division during the 2012 NCAA Division II football season. In their second season under head coach Curt Cignetti, the Crimson Howls compiled a 12–2 overall record, 6–1 in conference, won the PSAC championship, made it to the NCAA Division II Quarterfinal where they fell to Winston-Salem State 21–17, and outscored their opponents 471 to 175.

The team gained 3,630 rushing yards and 2,215 passing yards. On defense, they gave up 1,121 rushing yards and 2,489 passing yards. The team's individual leaders included:

- Running back Harvie Tuck led the team with 1,660 rushing yards on 269 carries.
- Redshirt junior quarterback Mike Box completed 111 of 214 passes for 1,747 yards, 13 touchdowns, and four interceptions.
- Junior wide receiver Terrill Barnes caught 43 passes for 764 yards and eight touchdowns.

The team's wide receivers coach was former NFL player Rod Rutherford.

The team played its home games at Miller Stadium in Indiana, Pennsylvania.

== Schedule ==
Date	Time	Opponent	Rank	Site	TV	Result	Attendance	Source
September 1	1:00 p.m.	Southern Connecticut*		Miller Stadium; Indiana, PA		W 33–6	2,585	
September 8	1:00 p.m.	at Cheyney*	No. 23	O'Shields-Stevenson Stadium; Cheyney, PA		W 56–0	463	
September 15	4:00 p.m.	Lock Haven	No. 17	Miller Stadium; Indiana, PA		W 42–0	1,860	
September 22	3:30 p.m.	at No. 6 California (PA)	No. 14	Adamson Stadium; California, PA (Coal Bowl)	WPCW	L 24–26	6,127	
September 29	1:00 p.m.	at Millersville*	No. 22	Biemesderfer Stadium; Millersville, PA		W 41–7	2,471	
October 6	2:00 p.m.	Slippery Rock	No. 22	Miller Stadium; Indiana, PA (rivalry)		W 33–16	3,912	
October 13	12:00 p.m.	at Edinboro	No. 22	Sox Harrison Stadium; Edinboro, PA		W 26–10	3,245	
October 20	1:00 p.m.	Mercyhurst	No. 20	Miller Stadium; Indiana, PA		W 31–13	1,896	
October 27	1:00 p.m.	Clarion	No. 16	Miller Stadium; Indiana, PA		W 45–0	2,930	
November 3	12:00 p.m.	at Gannon	No. 14	Gannon University Field; Erie, PA		W 38–35	756	
November 10	2:00 p.m.	No. 7 Shippensburg	No. 13	Miller Stadium; Indiana, PA (PSAC Championship Game)		W 41–10	4,576	
November 17	12:00 p.m.	No. 25 Shepherd	No. 11	Miller Stadium; Indiana, PA (NCAA Division II First Round)		W 27–17	1,617	
November 24	12:00 p.m.	at No. 8 New Haven	No. 7	Ralph F. DellaCamera Stadium; West Haven, CT (NCAA Division II Second Round)		W 17–14	2,034	
December 1	12:00 p.m.	at No. 2 Winston-Salem State	No. 7	Bowman Gray Stadium; Winston-Salem, NC (NCAA Division II Quarterfinal)		L 17–21	5,212	
*Non-conference game; Rankings from AFCA Poll released prior to the game; All times are in Eastern time
