= 2016 California Vulcans football team =

American college football season

2016 California Vulcans football
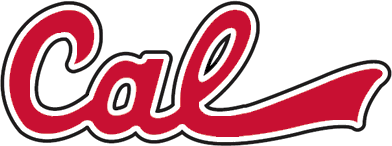

PSAC champion PSAC West Division champion

NCAA Third Round
- Conference: Pennsylvania State Athletic Conference
- West Division
- Record: 11–1 (7–0 PSAC)
- Head coach: Gary Dunn (1st season)
- Offensive coordinator: Chad Salisbury (8th season)
- Home stadium: Hepner–Bailey Field at Adamson Stadium

2016 Pennsylvania State Athletic Conference football standings
	Conf.			Overall
Team	W		L	W		L
Eastern
Kutztown xy	7	–	0	7	–	4
West Chester	6	–	1	8	–	3
Shippensburg	4	–	3	7	–	4
Bloomsburg	4	–	3	6	–	5
Lock Haven	4	–	3	4	–	7
East Stroudsburg	2	–	5	4	–	7
Millersville	1	–	6	2	–	9
Cheyney	0	–	7	1	–	10
Western
No. 7 California (PA) xy$^	7	–	0	11	–	1
No. 12 IUP ^	6	–	1	10	–	2
Edinboro	5	–	2	9	–	2
Slippery Rock	3	–	4	7	–	4
Clarion	3	–	4	4	–	7
Seton Hill	2	–	5	5	–	6
Gannon	1	–	6	5	–	6
Mercyhurst	1	–	6	3	–	8
Championship: California (PA) 49, Kutztown 7
$ – Conference champion; x – Division champion/co-champions; y – Championship game participant; ^ – NCAA Division II playoff participant; Rankings from AFCA poll

The 2016 California Vulcans football team represented California University of Pennsylvania during the 2016 NCAA Division II football season.

The Vulcans recorded an 11–1 record overall and a 7–0 mark in Pennsylvania State Athletic Conference (PSAC) games. The Vulcans were PSAC West and league champions and made it to the Third Round of the NCAA Division II football championship.

== Schedule ==
Date	Time	Opponent	Rank	Site	TV	Result	Attendance
September 10	1:00 p.m.	at Cheyney*	No. 19	O'Shields Stevenson Stadium; Cheyney, PA		W 79–3	1,117
September 17	1:00 p.m.	Millersville*	No. 15	Hepner–Bailey Field at Adamson Stadium; California, PA		W 61–0	3,225
September 24	3:00 p.m.	at Seton Hill	No. 13	Offutt Field; Greensburg, PA		W 59–17	1,345
October 1	1:00 p.m.	Slippery Rock	No. 11	Hepner–Bailey Field at Adamson Stadium; California, PA		W 52–26	2,769
October 8	7:00 p.m.	No. 5 IUP	No. 9	Hepner–Bailey Field at Adamson Stadium; California, PA (Coal Bowl)	PCN	W 31–28	5,015
October 15	6:00 p.m	at Clarion	No. 7	Memorial Stadium; Clarion, PA		W 48–20	2,034
October 22	3:00 p.m.	Gannon^{†}	No. 8	Hepner–Bailey Field at Adamson Stadium; California, PA		W 35–14	2,412
October 29	12:00 p.m.	at Mercyhurst	No. 3	Tullio Field; Erie, PA		W 55–14	1,372
November 5	1:00 p.m.	No. 7 Edinboro	No. 1	Hepner–Bailey Field at Adamson Stadium; California, PA		W 52–7	4,458
November 12	12:00 p.m.	No. 25 Kutztown*	No. 1	Hepner–Bailey Field at Adamson Stadium; California, PA (PSAC Championship Game)	PCN	W 49–7	6,324
November 26	1:00 p.m.	No. 5 IUP*	No. 1	Hepner–Bailey Field at Adamson Stadium; California, PA (NCAA Division II Second Round)	ESPNNews	W 44–23	1,126
December 3	1:00 p.m.	Shepherd*	No. 1	Hepner–Bailey Field at Adamson Stadium; California, PA (NCAA Division II Quarterfinal)	ESPN3	L 30–41	3,724
*Non-conference game; ^{†}Homecoming; Rankings from AFCA Poll released prior to the game; All times are in Eastern time

== Roster ==
2016 California Vulcans football team roster
Players
Coaches
Offense

Pos.	#	Name	Class
RB	1	Jimmy Wheeler	So
WR	6	Luke Smorey	Jr
WR	8	Tom Greene	Jr
WR	9	Garry Brown	Sr
QB	12	Marcus Prather	Jr
WR	14	Jordan Dandridge	So
QB	15	Michael Keir	Jr
QB	16	Darius Gibson	Fr
TE	87	Paul Butler
WR	88	Montell Britton	Fr
WR	89	Tyson Hill	Fr

Defense

Pos.	#	Name	Class
DB	2	Aaron Terry	Sr
DB	3	Brendan Edwards	So
LB	5	Brendan Blair	So
CB	7	Arnel Farmer Jr.	Sr
DB	10	Jordan Bowman	Sr
DB	13	Bryant Harper	Jr
DB	20	Vondel Bell	Jr
LB	21	DeVonte Suber	Jr
DB	22	Isaiah Scott	So
DB	26	Vincent Alimenti	So

Special teams

Pos.	#	Name	Class
K	97	Tristan Williams	Fr
K	99	Will Brazill	Jr

Head coach

- Gary Dunn

Coordinators/assistant coaches

- Chad Salisbury (Offensive coordinator / quarterbacks)
- Mike Craig (Defensive coordinator)

Legend

- (C) Team captain
- (S) Suspended
- (I) Ineligible
- Injured
- Redshirt

Roster

== Season leaders ==
=== Offense ===
Rushing

Player	G	Att.	Yds.	Avg.	TD
Nick Grissom	12	192	1,035	5.3	9
Jalen Bell	11	73	371	4.8	4
Jimmy Wheeler	9	40	282	6.7	1

Passing

Player	G	Att-Comp	Yds	TD	Int
Michael Keir	12	364-233	3,222	41	11
Marcus Prather	8	4-13	57	1	0

Receiving

Player	G	Rec	Yds	TD
Garry Brown	12	91	1,475	22
Tom Greene	11	51	717	6
Luke Smorey	12	35	446	6
Jordan Dandridge	11	20	222	2
Paul Butler	12	15	173	3

=== Defense ===
Only stats of players with 10 or more tackles

Player	Games	Tackles				Sacks	Fumbles			Pass defense		
	GP	Solo	Ast	Tot	TFL	Tot	Rec	Yds	FF	Int	Yds	PD
Luke Hrapchak	12	59	42	101	12.0	6.5	1	0	2	1	15	4
DeVonte Suber	12	36	25	61	6.5	3.0	0	0	0	0	0	3
Jawan Turner	12	23	26	49	12.0	6.5	3	42	4	0	0	4
Arnel Farmer Jr.	12	32	17	49	0	0	1	0	1	1	-1	3
Aaron Terry	12	29	15	44	6.0	0	1	0	1	3	80	6
Jordan Bowman	12	26	15	41	5.5	2.5	1	0	0	2	121	3
Justin Baker	12	14	22	36	5.0	2.5	0	0	1	0	0	0
Vondel Bell	12	30	5	35	1.0	0	0	0	0	2	78	7
Nigel Garnett	12	30	5	35	1.0	0	0	0	0	0	0	2
Cameron Tarver	12	16	18	34	12.0	5.5	3	0	1	0	0	4
Malik Akins	12	12	21	33	4.0	2.0	0	0	0	0	0	0
Jordan Lardani	12	15	15	30	16.0	9.5	0	0	3	0	0	3
Aaron Brown	12	16	11	27	1.0	0	0	0	0	1	5	5
Vincent Alimenti	12	18	8	26	2.0	0	0	0	0	0	0	1
Brendan Blair	11	9	6	15	6.5	3.0	1	12	1	1	20	2
Anthony Camp	11	6	7	13	3.0	.5	0	0	0	0	0	0
Bryant Harper	12	6	7	13	1.0	0	0	0	0	0	0	0
Corey Bopp	8	4	9	13	1.0	0	0	0	0	0	0	0
Dymond Thomas	11	6	6	12	1.5	1.0	0	0	0	1	13	2
Brendan Edwards	8	6	4	10	0	0	0	0	0	1	13	1

=== Special teams ===
Punting

Player	GP	Yds	Avg	Lng
Ian Patterson	12	594	37.1	55
Michael Keir	11	527	37.6	47

Punt returns

Player	Yds	Avg	Lng	TD
Garry Brown	273	13.6	53	2
Aaron Terry	218	12.8	37	0

Kick returns

Player	Yds	Avg	Lng	TD
Garry Brown	416	29.7	98	1
Jalen Bell	196	21.8	69	0
