= 2018 California Vulcans football team =

American college football season

2018 California Vulcans football
- Conference: Pennsylvania State Athletic Conference
- West Division
- Record: 7–4 (5–2 PSAC)
- Head coach: Gary Dunn (3rd season)
- Offensive coordinator: Chad Salisbury (10th season)
- Defensive coordinator: Mike Craig
- Home stadium: Hepner–Bailey Field at Adamson Stadium

2018 Pennsylvania State Athletic Conference football standings
	Conf.			Overall
Team	W		L	W		L
East
No. 17 West Chester xy$^	6	–	0	10	–	1
Kutztown ^	5	–	1	9	–	2
Bloomsburg	4	–	2	6	–	5
Shippensburg	3	–	3	6	–	5
Millersville	2	–	4	2	–	9
Lock Haven	1	–	5	2	–	9
East Stroudsburg	0	–	6	2	–	9
West
No. 12 Slippery Rock xy^	7	–	0	11	–	3
IUP	5	–	2	8	–	3
California (PA)	5	–	2	7	–	4
Edinboro	3	–	4	6	–	5
Mercyhurst	3	–	4	5	–	6
Clarion	2	–	5	4	–	7
Gannon	2	–	5	2	–	9
Seton Hill	1	–	6	1	–	10
Championship: West Chester 33, Slippery Rock 10
$ – Conference champion; x – Division champion/co-champions; y – Championship game participant; ^ – NCAA Division II playoff participant; Rankings from AFCA poll

The 2018 California Vulcans football team represented California University of Pennsylvania during the 2018 NCAA Division II football season as a member of the Pennsylvania State Athletic Conference (PSAC).

== Background ==
=== Previous season ===
In the 2017 season the Vulcan went 9–3 overall (5–2 PSAC) and lost in the first round of the NCAA Division II Football Championship to Assumption College, 31–40.

=== Departures ===
Player	Position	Reason left	Hometown
Vondel Bell	DB	Graduated	Wheeling, WV
Tom Greene	WR	Graduated	Pittsburgh, PA
Nick Grissom	RB	Graduated	Cincinnati, OH
Luke Smorey	WR	Graduated	Pittsburgh, PA
DeVonte Suber	LB	Graduated	Coatesville, PA
Michael Keir	QB	Graduated	Philadelphia, PA
Bryant Harper	DB	Graduated	McKeesport, PA
Cameron Tarver	LB	Graduated	Columbus, OH

== Schedule ==
Date	Time	Opponent	Site	Result	Attendance
August 31	7:00 p.m.	at No. 23 Ohio Dominican*	Panther Stadium; Columbus, OH	L 23–28	1,513
September 8	12:00 p.m.	at Kutztown*	Andre Reed Stadium; Kutztown, PA	L 31–34	3,162
September 15	1:00 p.m.	at Shippensburg*	Seth Grove Stadium; Shippensburg, PA	W 57–14	5,311
September 22	1:00 p.m.	Edinboro	Hepner–Bailey Field at Adamson Stadium; California, PA	W 40–35	4,523
September 29	6:00 p.m.	No. 2 IUP	Hepner–Bailey Field at Adamson Stadium; California, PA (Coal Bowl)	W 36–24	4,902
October 6	2:00 p.m.	at Clarion	Memorial Stadium; Clarion, PA	W 41–27	2,100
October 13	3:00 p.m.	Gannon^{†}	Hepner–Bailey Field at Adamson Stadium; California, PA	L 15–29	2,720
October 20	12:00 p.m.	Mercyhurst	Louis J Tullio Field; Erie, PA	W 23–0	1,082
October 27	1:00 p.m.	Slippery Rock	Hepner–Bailey Field at Adamson Stadium; California, PA	L 21–44	1,984
November 3	12:00 p.m.	Seton Hill	Offutt Field; Greensburg, PA	W 49–34	650
November 10	1:00 p.m.	West Chester	Hepner–Bailey Field at Adamson Stadium; California, PA	W 28–13	741
*Non-conference game; ^{†}Homecoming; Rankings from AFCA Poll; All times are in Eastern time

== Rankings ==
Ranking movements
	Week												
Poll	Pre	1	2	3	4	5	6	7	8	9	10	11	Final
AFCA Coaches													
D2football													

== Coaching staff ==
Name	Position
Gary Dunn	Head coach
Chad Salisbury	Offensive coordinator
Mike Craig	Defensive coordinator
Peter Davila	Defensive backs
Larry Wilson	Wide receivers/Special teams
Dave Durich	Offensive line
