= 2012 Little All-America college football team =

The 2012 Little All-America college football team is composed of college football players from Division II, III, and NAIA schools who were selected by the Associated Press (AP) as the best players at each position.

== First team ==
| Position | Player | Team |
|---|---|---|
Offense
| Quarterback | Zach Zulli | Shippensburg |
| Running back | Franklyn Quiteh | Bloomsburg |
| Running back | Michael Hill | Missouri Western |
| Running back | James Clay | Mount St. Joseph |
| Wide receiver | Jeff Janis | Saginaw Valley State |
| Wide receiver | Isaiah Voegeli | Merrimack |
| Offensive line | Garth Heikkinen | Minnesota Duluth |
| Offensive line | Manase Foketi | West Texas A&M |
| Offensive line | Mark Jackson | Glenville State |
| Offensive line | Ryan Schraeder | Valdosta State |
| Offensive line | Curtis James | St. Thomas (Minn.) |
Defense
| Defensive line | Brandon Williams | Missouri Southern |
| Defensive line | Ethan Westbrooks | West Texas A&M |
| Defensive line | B.J. Stevens | California (Pa.) |
| Defensive line | D.J. Chappell | Huntingdon |
| Linebacker | Corey Johnson | Catawba |
| Linebacker | Leron Furr | Fort Valley State |
| Linebacker | Ronnell Williams | West Chester |
| Defensive back | Rontez Miles | California (Pa.) |
| Defensive back | Nick Driskill | Mount Union |
| Defensive back | Jack Moro | St. Cloud State |
| Defensive back | Trelan Taylor | Chadron State |
Special Teams
| Kicker | Sergio Castillo | West Texas A&M |
| Punter | John Brown | Pittsburg State |
| All-purpose | Taylor Accardi | Colorado Mines |

== See also ==
- 2012 College Football All-America Team
