= 2015 California Vulcans football team =

American college football season

2015 California Vulcans football
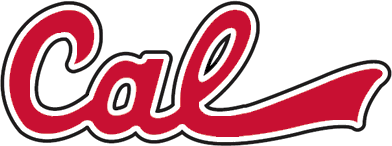
- Conference: Pennsylvania State Athletic Conference
- West Division
- Record: 8–3 (5–2 PSAC)
- Head coach: Mike Kellar (4th season)
- Offensive coordinator: Chad Salisbury (7th season)
- Home stadium: Hepner–Bailey Field at Adamson Stadium

2015 Pennsylvania State Athletic Conference football standings
	Conf.			Overall
Team	W		L	W		L
East
West Chester xy	6	–	1	7	–	4
Shippensburg	5	–	2	8	–	3
Bloomsburg	5	–	2	7	–	4
Kutztown	5	–	2	7	–	4
East Stroudsburg	4	–	3	6	–	5
Lock Haven	2	–	5	2	–	9
Millersville	1	–	6	2	–	9
Cheyney	0	–	7	0	–	11
West
No. 7 Slippery Rock xy$^	6	–	1	11	–	1
No. 19 IUP x^	6	–	1	9	–	2
California (PA)	5	–	2	8	–	3
Clarion	4	–	3	7	–	4
Gannon	3	–	4	6	–	5
Mercyhurst	2	–	5	5	–	6
Seton Hill	2	–	5	3	–	8
Edinboro	0	–	7	0	–	11
Championship: Slippery Rock 61, West Chester 12
$ – Conference champion; x – Division champion/co-champions; y – Championship game participant; ^ – NCAA Division II playoff participant; Rankings from AFCA poll

The 2015 California Vulcans football team represented California University of Pennsylvania during the 2015 NCAA Division II football season.

== Schedule ==
Date	Time	Opponent	Site	Result	Attendance	Source
September 5	1:00 p.m.	at Virginia State*	Rogers Stadium; Ettrick, VA	W 35–16	4,000	
September 12	1:00 p.m.	Bloomsburg*	Adamson Stadium; California, PA	L 13–20	2,366	
September 19	1:00 p.m.	Shippensburg*	Adamson Stadium; California, PA	W 34–26	2,707	
September 26	12:00 p.m.	at Edinboro	Sox Harrison Stadium; Edinboro, PA	W 37–30	1,913	
October 3	1:00 p.m.	Seton Hill	Adamson Stadium; California, PA	W 38–34	1,526	
October 10	2:00 p.m.	at Slippery Rock	Mihalik–Thompson Stadium; Slippery Rock, PA	L 21–56	9,643	
October 17	6:00 p.m.	at IUP	Miller Stadium; Indiana, PA (Coal Bowl)	L 15–20	2,473	
October 24	3:00 p.m.	No. 25 Clarion^{†}	Adamson Stadium; California, PA	W 42–28	3,286	
October 31	12:00 p.m.	at Gannon	McConnell Family Stadium; Erie, PA	W 42–21	1,154	
November 7	1:00 p.m.	Mercyhurst	Adamson Stadium; California, PA	W 31–21	1,793	
November 14	1:00 p.m.	at Lock Haven*	Hubert Jack Stadium; Lock Haven, PA	W 56–24	946	
*Non-conference game; ^{†}Homecoming; Rankings from AFCA Poll released prior to the game; All times are in Eastern time

== Game summaries ==
=== At Virginia State ===
	1	2	3	4	Total
Cal U Vulcans	14	14	7	0	35
VSU Trojans	0	9	0	7	16

Scoring summary

Quarter	Time	Drive			Team	Scoring information	Score	
Quarter	Time	Plays	Yards	TOP	Team	Scoring information	Cal U	VSU
1	14:45	1	50	0:07	Cal U	K. Scott 50-yard touchdown reception from J. Harris, W. Brazill kick good	7	0
1	7:15	2	87	1:07	Cal U	G. Brown 90-yard touchdown reception from J. Harris, W. Brazill kick good	14	0
2	14:48	3	90	1:01	Cal U	G. Brown 87-yard touchdown reception from J. Harris, W. Brazill kick good	21	0
2	11:35	8	80	3:13	VSU	T. Ayres 20-yard touchdown reception from W. Stubblefield, 2-point pass failed	21	6
2	10:29	3	63	1:02	Cal U	J. Franklin 3-yard touchdown run, W. Brazill kick good	28	6
2	0:00	5	32	2:11	VSU	23-yard field goal by M. Hillquist	28	9
3	3:37	13	89	6:19	Cal U	L. Smorey 31-yard touchdown reception from J. Harris, W. Brazill kick good	35	9
4	0:45	4	60	1:00	VSU	W. Stubblefield 27-yard touchdown reception from T. Ayres, M. Hillquist kick good	35	16
"TOP" = time of possession. For other American football terms, see Glossary of American football.							35	16

Statistics	Cal U	VSU
First downs	14	24
Total yards	476	334
Rushes–yards	32–89	37–70
Passing yards	387	264
Passing: Comp–Att–Int	12–14–0	16–28–1
Time of possession	25:10	34:50

Team	Category	Player	Statistics
Cal U	Passing	J. Harris	12/14, 387 yds, 4 TD
Cal U	Rushing	J. Franklin III	12 car, 53 yds, 1 TD
Cal U	Receiving	G. Brown	4 rec, 203 yds, 2 TD
VSU	Passing	T. Ayres	15/26, 244 yds, 1 TD, 1 INT
VSU	Rushing	K. Bellamy	14 car, 32 yds
VSU	Receiving	W. Stubblefield	4 rec, 90 yds, 1 TD

=== Bloomsburg ===
	1	2	3	4	Total
BU Huskies	0	3	10	7	20
Cal U Vulcans	7	6	0	0	13

Scoring summary

Quarter	Time	Drive			Team	Scoring information	Score	
Quarter	Time	Plays	Yards	TOP	Team	Scoring information	BU	Cal U
1	3:36	10	91	4:15	Cal U	J. Franklin 3-yard touchdown run, W. Brazill kick good	0	7
2	8:49	13	59	6:27	Cal U	37-yard field goal by W. Brazill	0	10
2	2:53	5	25	1:11	Cal U	33-yard field goal by W. Brazill	0	13
2	0:51	8	61	1:55	BU	35-yard field goal by T. Smith	3	13
3	9:02	13	50	5:52	BU	38-yard field goal by T. Smith	6	13
3	2:42	9	41	4:45	BU	T. Kelly 1-yard touchdown run, T. Smith kick good	13	13
4	2:40	7	45	4:00	BU	L. Elliott 24-yard touchdown run, T. Smith kick good	20	13
"TOP" = time of possession. For other American football terms, see Glossary of American football.							20	13

Statistics	BU	Cal U
First downs	20	17
Total yards	326	358
Rushes–yards	55–255	29–95
Passing yards	71	263
Passing: Comp-Att-Int	10–24–1	17–33–3
Time of possession	37:07	22:53

Team	Category	Player	Statistics
BU	Passing	T. Kelly	10/24, 71 yds, 1 INT
BU	Rushing	L. Elliott Jr.	26 car, 166 yds, 1 TD
BU	Receiving	C. Hoffman	4 rec, 38 yds
Cal U	Passing	J. Harris	17/33, 263 yds, 3 INT
Cal U	Rushing	J. Franklin III	14 car, 77 yds, 1 TD
Cal U	Receiving	G. Brown	4 rec, 63 yds

=== Shippensburg ===
	1	2	3	4	Total
SU Red Raiders	7	3	13	3	26
Cal U Vulcans	7	27	0	0	34

=== At Edinboro ===
	1	2	3	4	Total
Cal U Vulcans	13	3	14	7	37
EU Fighting Scots	2	7	14	7	30

=== Seton Hill ===
	1	2	3	4	Total
SHU Griffins	7	14	10	3	34
Cal U Vulcans	3	0	21	14	38

=== At Slippery Rock ===
	1	2	3	4	Total
Cal U Vulcans	7	0	0	14	21
SRU The Rock	14	21	14	7	56

=== At IUP ===
	1	2	3	4	Total
Cal U Vulcans	9	0	0	6	15
IUP Crimson Hawks	7	6	7	0	20

=== No. 25 Clarion ===
	1	2	3	4	Total
CU Golden Eagles	7	7	0	14	28
Cal U Vulcans	21	7	14	0	42

=== At Gannon ===
	1	2	3	4	Total
Cal U Vulcans	21	14	0	7	42
GU Golden Knights	0	7	7	7	21

=== Mercyhurst ===
	1	2	3	4	Total
MU Lakers	0	0	7	14	21
Cal U Vulcans	10	7	7	7	31

=== At Lock Haven ===
	1	2	3	4	Total
Cal U Vulcans	14	21	14	7	56
LHU Bald Eagles	10	7	7	0	24
