= 2016 PSAC Football Championship Game =

Kutztown Golden Bears	California Vulcans
(7–3)	(9–0)
7	49
	1	2	3	4	Total
Kutztown	0	0	0	7	7
California	7	21	14	7	49
- Date: November 12, 2016
- Season: 2016
- Stadium: Hepner–Bailey Field at Adamson Stadium
- Location: California, Pennsylvania
- Referee: Mike Serach
- Attendance: 6,324

United States TV coverage
- Network: ESPN2

The 2016 PSAC Football Championship Game was held on November 12, 2016 at a Hepner–Bailey Field at Adamson Stadium. The two teams from each division (East and West) played for the PSAC Championship and an automatic bid into the NCAA Division II Football Championship.

== Box score ==
Scoring summary

Quarter	Time	Drive			Team	Scoring information	Score	
Quarter	Time	Plays	Yards	TOP	Team	Scoring information	KUTZ	CAL
1	3:27	6	56	2:10	CAL	John Franklin 1-yard touchdown run, Will Brazill kick good	0	7
2	9:09	9	54	4:05	CAL	Garry Brown 12-yard touchdown reception from Michael Keir, Will Brazill kick good	0	14
2	1:12	10	58	5:12	CAL	Luke Smorey 23-yard touchdown reception from Michael Keir, Will Brazill kick good	0	21
2	00:23	3	44	0:22	CAL	Chad Livingston 8-yard touchdown reception from Michael Keir, Will Brazill kick good	0	28
3	1:59	1	9	0:05	CAL	Garry Brown 9-yard touchdown reception from Michael Keir, Will Brazill kick good	0	35
4	12:04	9	50	3:29	CAL	Tom Greene 21-yard touchdown reception from Michael Keir, Will Brazill kick good	0	42
4	4:19	3	42	1:22	CAL	Jimmy Wheeler 20-yard touchdown run, Will Brazill kick good	0	49
4	00:49	11	78	3:21	KUTZ	Kellen Williams 19-yard touchdown reception from Collin DiGalbo, Brandon Keffer kick good	7	49
"TOP" = time of possession. For other American football terms, see Glossary of American football.							7	49

=== Stats ===
Statistic	KUTZ	CAL
Plays	74	69
First downs	15	21
Rushing Yds	109	190
Passing Yds	217	251
Total Yds	270	421
