= 2012 California Vulcans football team =

American college football season

2012 California Vulcans football
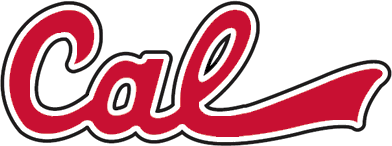
- Conference: Pennsylvania State Athletic Conference
- West Division
- Record: 8–3 (5–2 PSAC)
- Head coach: Mike Kellar (1st season)
- Offensive coordinator: Chad Salisbury (4th season)
- Home stadium: Adamson Stadium

2012 Pennsylvania State Athletic Conference football standings
	Conf.			Overall
Team	W		L	W		L
East
No. 14 Shippensburg xy^	7	–	0	11	–	2
No. 17 Bloomsburg ^	6	–	1	10	–	2
West Chester	4	–	3	7	–	4
East Stroudsburg	4	–	3	5	–	5
Kutztown	4	–	3	7	–	4
LIU Post	2	–	5	3	–	7
Millersville	1	–	6	2	–	9
Cheyney	0	–	7	1	–	10
West
No. 7 IUP xy$^	6	–	1	12	–	3
Mercyhurst x	6	–	1	9	–	2
California (PA)	5	–	2	8	–	3
Slippery Rock	5	–	2	6	–	5
Edinboro	3	–	4	4	–	6
Clarion	2	–	5	4	–	7
Gannon	1	–	6	3	–	8
Lock Haven	0	–	7	1	–	10
Championship: IUP 41, Shippensburg 10
$ – Conference champion; x – Division champion/co-champions; y – Championship game participant; ^ – NCAA Division II playoff participant; Rankings from AFCA poll

The 2012 California Vulcans football team represented California University of Pennsylvania in the 2012 NCAA Division II football season. They were led by first year head coach Mike Kellar and played their home games at Adamson Stadium. They were a member of the Pennsylvania State Athletic Conference. They finished the season 8–3, 5–2 in PSAC West play to finish in a tie for third place along with Slippery Rock.

== Schedule ==
Date	Time	Opponent	Rank	Site	TV	Result	Attendance
August 30	5:00 p.m.	No. 17 Hillsdale*	No. 11	Adamson Stadium; California, PA		W 30–22	4,236
September 8	6:00 p.m.	at No. 11 Kutztown*	No. 10	University Field; Kutztown, PA		W 48–45	2,348
September 15	6:00 p.m.	at Edinboro	No. 6	Sox Harrison Stadium; Edinboro, PA	WPCW	W 24–14	4,837
September 22	3:30 p.m.	No. 14 Indiana (PA)	No. 6	Adamson Stadium; California, PA (Coal Bowl)	WPCW	W 26–24	6,127
September 29	3:30 p.m.	West Chester*	No. 6	Adamson Stadium; California, PA	WPCW	L 34–37	2,348
October 6	2:00 p.m.	at Clarion	No. 16	Memorial Stadium; Clarion, PA		W 41–22	5,505
October 13	3:30 p.m.	Lock Haven^{†}	No. 15	Adamson Stadium; California, PA		W 30–0	4,562
October 20	12:00 p.m.	at Gannon	No. 14	Gannon University Field; Erie, PA		W 41–0	1,024
October 27	3:30 p.m.	Slippery Rock	No. 13	Adamson Stadium; California, PA	WPCW	L 26–28	2,354
November 3	12:00 p.m.	at Mercyhurst	No. 22	Louis J. Tullio Field; Erie, PA		L 7–40	800
November 10	3:30 p.m.	Millersville*		Adamson Stadium; California, PA		W 56–28	1,573
*Non-conference game; ^{†}Homecoming; Rankings from Coaches' Poll released prior to the game; All times are in Eastern time

- Source: Schedule

== Game summaries ==
=== Hillsdale ===
Hillsdale at California (PA)

Team	1	2	3	4	Total
#17 Chargers	14	0	0	8	22
• #11 Vulcans	7	14	6	3	30

- Date: August 30
- Location: Adamson Stadium
  California, PA
- Game start: 5:00 PM EDT
- Elapsed time: 2:50
- Game attendance: 4,236
- Game weather: 84 °F (29 °C) • SSW 2 mph (3.2 km/h) • Sunny
- Referee: Jeff Pumphrey

Scoring summary
1	7:12	Hillsdale	Anthony Mifsud 19 yard run (Colin McGreecy kick), Drive: 9 plays, 92 yards, 4:19	0–7
1	5:29	California (PA)	Mike Williams 39 yard pass from Peter Lalich (Cody Nuzzo kick), Drive: 4 plays, 54 yards, 1:35	7–7
1	2:45	Hillsdale	Cam White 1 yard run (Colin McGreecy kick), Drive: 6 plays, 80 yards, 2:37	7–14
2	14:51	California (PA)	Trey Johnson 6 yard pass from Peter Lalich (Cody Nuzzo kick), Drive: 7 plays, 76 yards, 2:50	14–14
2	0:28	California (PA)	Mike Williams 5 yard pass from Peter Lalich (Cody Nuzzo kick), Drive: 4 plays, 57 yards, 0:57	21–14
3	12:05	California (PA)	Trey Johnson 7 yard pass from Peter Lalich (Cody Nuzzo kick failed), Drive: 6 plays, 18 yards, 1:52	28–14
4	14:04	California (PA)	Cody Nuzzo 25 yard field goal, Drive: 12 plays, 66 yards, 5:10	30–14
4	3:56	Hillsdale	Mike Carter 5 yard pass from Anthony Mifsud (Mike Carter pass from Anthony Mifsud for two-point conv.), Drive: 15 plays, 99 yards, 4:53	30–22

=== At Kutztown ===
California (PA) at Kutztown

Team	1	2	3	4	Total
• #10 Vulcans	20	7	0	21	48
#11 Golden Bears	0	17	21	7	45

- Date: September 8
- Location: University Stadium
  Kutztown, PA
- Game start: 6:05 PM EDT
- Elapsed time: 3:39
- Game attendance: 2,348
- Game weather: 75 °F (24 °C) • SW 16 mph (26 km/h) • Rain
- Referee: Steven Keller

Scoring summary
1	9:04	California (PA)	Lamont Smith 9 yard run (Cody Nuzzo kick), Drive: 7 plays, 42 yards, 2:42	7–0
1	3:12	California (PA)	Nadir Brown 3 yard pass from Peter Lalich (Cody Nuzzo kick failed), Drive: 7 plays, 62 yards, 3:41	13–0
1	0:45	California (PA)	Cody Cook 7 yard run (Cody Nuzzo kick), Drive: 4 plays, 69 yards, 1:04	20–0
2	11:59	California (PA)	Peter Lalich 1 yard run (Cody Nuzzo kick), Drive: 5 plays, 22 yards, 1:44	27–0
2	10:18	Kutztown	Brett Fox 19 yard pass from Kevin Morton (Jack Ruggieri kick), Drive: 4 plays, 73 yards, 1:41	27–7
2	2:26	Kutztown	Josh Mastromatto 16 yard pass from Kevin Morton (Jack Ruggieri kick), Drive: 3 plays, 13 yards, 1:22	27–14
2	0:01	Kutztown	Jack Ruggieri 31 yard field goal, Drive: 6 plays, 66 yards, 0:40	27–17
3	13:01	Kutztown	Colby Tuell 29 yard pass from Kevin Morton (Jack Ruggieri kick), Drive: 7 plays, 75 yards, 1:59	27–24
3	8:15	Kutztown	Josh Mastromatto 6 yard run (Jack Ruggieri kick), Drive: 1 plays, 6 yards, 0:05	27–31
3	3:43	Kutztown	Colby Tuell 10 yard pass from Kevin Morton (Jack Ruggieri kick), Drive: 3 plays, 2 yards, 0:00	27–38
4	12:24	California (PA)	Jeff Knox Jr. 6 yard run (two-point pass conv. failed), Drive: 4 plays, 21 yards, 0:31	33–38
4	4:10	California (PA)	Jeff Knox Jr. 4 yard run (Blake Williamson pass from Peter Lalich for two-point conv.), Drive: 10 plays, 61 yards, 3:16	41–38
4	1:51	Kutztown	Curtis Wortham 2 yard run (Jack Ruggieri kick), Drive: 7 plays, 35 yards, 2:19	41–45
4	1:02	California (PA)	Kowan Scott 39 yard pass from Peter Lalich (Cody Nuzzo kick), Drive: 4 plays, 67 yards, 0:49	48–45

=== At Edinboro ===
California (PA) at Edinboro

Team	1	2	3	4	Total
• #6 Vulcans	3	7	0	14	24
Fighting Scots	0	7	0	7	14

- Date: September 15
- Location: Sox Harrison Stadium
  Edinboro, PA
- Game start: 6:09 PM EDT
- Elapsed time: 3:13
- Game attendance: 4,837
- Game weather: 65 °F (18 °C) • 10 mph (16 km/h) • Partly cloudy
- Referee: Dennis Beck
- TV announcers (WPCW): Stan Savran (play-by-play)
  John Sanders (color)

Scoring summary
1	12:37	California (PA)	Cody Nuzzo 22 yard field goal, Drive: 7 plays, 60 yards, 2:23	3–0
2	11:04	Edinboro	John Washington 1 yard run (Sean Seefeldt kick), Drive: 7 plays, 41 yards, 2:19	3–7
2	0:39	California (PA)	Mike Williams 32 yard pass from Peter Lalich (Cody Nuzzo kick), Drive: 6 plays, 63 yards, 0:50	10–7
4	13:24	California (PA)	Nadir Brown 27 yard pass from Peter Lalich (Cody Nuzzo kick), Drive: 7 plays, 60 yards, 2:34	17–7
4	10:34	Edinboro	Duane McKelvin 12 yard pass from Cody Harris (Sean Seefeldt kick), Drive: 7 plays, 75 yards, 2:50	17–14
4	9:23	California (PA)	Lamont Smith 6 yard run (Cody Nuzzo kick), Drive: 3 plays, 55 yards, 1:11	24–14

=== IUP ===
IUP at California (PA)

Team	1	2	3	4	Total
#14 Crimson Hawks	3	7	0	14	24
• #6 Vulcans	7	10	0	9	26

- Date: September 22
- Location: Adamson Stadium
  California, PA
- Game start: 3:30 PM EDT
- Elapsed time: 3:40
- Game attendance: 6,127
- Game weather: 70 °F (21 °C) • W 20 mph (32 km/h) • Clear
- Referee: Charlie Lebran
- TV announcers (WPCW): Stan Savran (play-by-play)
  John Sanders (color)

Scoring summary
1	11:13	California (PA)	Mike Williams 5 yard pass from Peter Lalich (Cody Nuzzo kick), Drive: 10 plays, 75 yards, 3:47	7–0
2	12:23	IUP	Harvie Tuck 14 yard run (Brett Ullman kick), Drive: 4 plays, 35 yards, 2:08	7–7
2	6:00	California (PA)	R.J. Thomas 20 yard pass from Peter Lalich (Cody Nuzzo kick), Drive: 6 plays, 63 yards, 2:17	14–7
2	3:01	IUP	Brett Ullman 41 yard field goal, Drive: 5 plays, 53 yards, 2:54	14–10
2	0:00	California (PA)	Cody Nuzzo 20 yard field goal, Drive: 11 plays, 73 yards, 2:54	17–10
4	10:14	IUP	Harvie Tuck 3 yard run (Brett Ullman kick), Drive: 7 plays, 35 yards, 2:25	17–17
4	6:58	IUP	Pat Brewer 8 yard pass from Mike Box (Brett Ullman kick), Drive: 5 plays, 51 yards, 2:14	17–24
4	0:52	California (PA)	Nadir Brown 80 yard pass from Peter Lalich (Cody Nuzzo kick failed), Drive: 1 plays, 80 yards, 0:11	24–24
4	0:03	California (PA)	Cody Nuzzo 30 yard field goal, Drive: 6 plays, 31 yards, 0:48	26–24

=== West Chester ===
West Chester at California (PA)

Team	1	2	3	4	Total
• Golden Rams	14	13	0	10	37
#6 Vulcans	0	13	14	7	34

- Date: September 29
- Location: Adamson Stadium
  California, PA
- Game start: 3:30 PM EDT
- Elapsed time: 3:32
- Game attendance: 2,348
- Game weather: 64 °F (18 °C) • W 2 mph (3.2 km/h) • Mostly cloudy
- Referee: Michael Davis
- TV announcers (WPCW): Stan Savran (play-by-play)
  John Sanders (color)

Scoring summary
1	12:52	West Chester	John O'Donnell 48 yard fumble recovery (Shawn Leo kick)	0–7
1	6:17	West Chester	Jim Kelly 7 yard pass from Mike Mattei (Shawn Leo kick), Drive: 12 plays, 56 yards, 5:37	0–14
2	7:55	California (PA)	Jeff Knox Jr. 2 yard run (Cody Nuzzo kick), Drive: 5 plays, 28 yards, 1:33	7–14
2	3:23	West Chester	Rondell White 22 yard pass from Mike Mattei (Shawn Leo kick), Drive: 10 plays, 65 yards, 4:25	7–21
2	1:57	California (PA)	Kowan Scott 44 yard pass from Peter Lalich (Cody Nuzzo kick failed), Drive: 5 plays, 77 yards, 1:21	13–21
2	1:26	West Chester	Jim Kelly 51 yard pass from Mike Mattei (Shawn Leo kick failed), Drive: 4 plays, 74 yards, 0:27	13–27
3	8:13	California (PA)	Jeff Knox Jr. 3 yard run (Cody Nuzzo kick failed), Drive: 10 plays, 47 yards, 4:37	19–27
3	3:29	California (PA)	Trey Johnson 12 yard pass from Peter Lalich (Mike Williams pass from Peter Lalich for two-point conv.) Drive: 8 plays, 66 yards, 3:14	27–27
4	7:28	West Chester	Shawn Leo 43 yard field goal, Drive: 8 plays, 51 yards, 2:22	27–30
4	3:22	West Chester	Rondell White 1 yard run (Shawn Leo kick), Drive: 6 plays, 60 yards, 3:12	27–37
4	2:16	California (PA)	Trey Johnson 15 yd pass from Peter Lalich (Cody Nuzzo kick), Drive: 5 plays, 78 yards, 0:57	34–37

=== At Clarion ===
California (PA) at Clarion

Team	1	2	3	4	Total
• #16 Vulcans	14	21	0	6	41
Golden Eagles	0	7	7	8	22

- Date: October 6
- Location: Memorial Stadium
  Clarion, PA
- Game start: 2:00 PM EDT
- Elapsed time: 2:52
- Game attendance: 5,505
- Game weather: 52 °F (11 °C) • WNW 10 mph (16 km/h) • Overcast
- Referee: Joe Caruso

Scoring summary
1	11:46	California (PA)	Lamont Smith 5 yard run (Cody Nuzzo kick), Drive: 7 plays, 48 yards, 2:16	7–0
1	5:51	California (PA)	Mike Williams 37 yard pass from Peter Lalich (Cody Nuzzo kick), Drive: 5 plays, 60 yards, 2:29	14–0
2	12:09	California (PA)	Blake Williamson 24 yard pass from Peter Lalich (Cody Nuzzo kick), Drive: 8 plays, 53 yards, 3:25	21–0
2	9:40	California (PA)	Trey Johnson 67 yard pass from Peter Lalich (Cody Nuzzo kick), Drive: 1 plays, 67 yards, 0:11	28–0
2	6:16	Clarion	Ben Fiscus 2 yard run (Nathan Conway kick), Drive: 7 plays, 75 yards, 3:16	28–7
2	1:36	California (PA)	Jeff Knox Jr. 2 yard run (Cody Nuzzo kick), Drive: 9 plays, 59 yards, 4:33	35–7
3	1:13	Clarion	Nick Perry 12 yard pass from Ben Fiscus (Nathan Conway kick), Drive: 9 plays, 35 yards, 3:13	35–14
4	7:40	California (PA)	Lamont Smith 12 yard run (Cody Nuzzo kick failed), Drive: 5 plays, 83 yards, 1:57	41–14
4	1:33	Clarion	Anthony Becoate 1 yard pass from Ben Fiscus (Aaron Barlow pass from Ben Fiscus for two-point conv.), Drive: 7 plays, 28 yards, 2:28	41–22

=== Lock Haven (homecoming) ===
Lock Haven at California (PA)

Team	1	2	3	4	Total
Bald Eagles	0	0	0	0	0
• #15 Vulcans	7	10	6	7	30

- Date: October 13
- Location: Adamson Stadium
  California, PA
- Game start: 3:30 PM EDT
- Elapsed time: 2:37
- Game attendance: 4,562
- Game weather: 66 °F (19 °C) • SSW 9 mph (14 km/h) • Clear, cool
- Referee: Russ Lickfield

Scoring summary
1	7:03	California (PA)	Kowan Scott 68 yard pass from Cody Schroeder (Cody Nuzzo kick), Drive: 4 plays, 94 yards, 1:50	7–0
2	14:52	California (PA)	R.J. Thomas 10 yard pass from Cody Schroeder (Cody Nuzzo kick), Drive: 8 plays, 72 yards, 3:46	14–0
2	1:47	California (PA)	Cody Nuzzo 23 yard field goal, Drive: 14 plays, 76 yards, 7:10	17–0
3	11:04	California (PA)	Cody Nuzzo 30 yard field goal, Drive: 9 plays, 42 yards, 3:52	20–0
3	5:42	California (PA)	Cody Nuzzo 25 yard field goal, Drive: 9 plays, 34 yards, 3:28	23–0
4	14:35	California (PA)	Mike Williams 6 yard pass from Cody Schroeder (Cody Nuzzo kick), Drive: 9 plays, 50 yards, 4:22	30–0

=== At Gannon ===
California (PA) at Gannon

Team	1	2	3	4	Total
• #14 Vulcans	6	14	7	14	41
Golden Knights	0	0	0	0	0

- Date: October 20
- Location: Gannon University Field
  Erie, PA
- Game start: 12:00 PM EDT
- Elapsed time: 3:00
- Game attendance: 2,354
- Game weather: 50s • SW 15–25 • Cloudy, Rain at times
- Referee: Joe Caruso

Scoring summary
1	9:52	California (PA)	Cody Nuzzo 46 yard field goal, Drive: 4 plays, 0 yards, 0:22	3–0
1	6:43	California (PA)	Cody Nuzzo 26 yard field goal, Drive: 5 plays, 10 yards, 1:49	6–0
2	3:24	California (PA)	Jeff Knox Jr. 3 yard run (Cody Nuzzo kick), Drive: 2 plays, 3 yards, 0:40	13–0
2	2:48	California (PA)	Darnell Harding 32 yard fumble recovery (Cody Nuzzo kick)	20–0
3	12:05	California (PA)	Jeff Knox Jr. 23 yard run (Cody Nuzzo kick), Drive: 11 plays, 75 yards, 2:55	27–0
4	12:36	California (PA)	Cody Cook 2 yard run (Cody Nuzzo kick), Drive: 12 plays, 70 yards, 4:55	34–0
4	2:08	California (PA)	Jake Forsythe 14 yard run (Cody Nuzzo kick), Drive: 4 plays, 13 yards, 1:42	41–0

=== Slippery Rock ===
Slippery Rock at California (PA)

Team	1	2	3	4	Total
• The Rock	7	7	14	0	28
#13 Vulcans	3	7	3	13	26

- Date: October 27
- Location: Adamson Stadium
  California, PA
- Game start: 3:30 PM EDT
- Elapsed time: 3:21
- Game attendance: 2,354
- Game weather: 53 °F (12 °C) • Cool, Windy, Rainy
- Referee: Dan Boyle
- TV announcers (WPCW): Stan Savran (play-by-play)
  John Sanders (color)

Scoring summary
1	6:35	California (PA)	Cody Nuzzo 42 yard field goal, Drive: 18 plays, 56 yards, 8:25	3–0
1	3:39	Slippery Rock	Nigel Barksdale 9 yard run (Kurt Brackman kick), Drive: 8 plays, 70 yards, 2:54	3–7
2	12:13	California (PA)	Rontez Miles 31 yard fumble recovery (Cody Nuzzo kick)	10–7
2	0:11	Slippery Rock	Andrew Bridgeforth 4 yard pass from Nigel Barksdale (Kurt Brackman kick), Drive: 17 plays, 84 yards, 5:27	10–14
3	11:48	Slippery Rock	Brett Crenshaw 2 yard run (Kurt Brackman kick), Drive: 8 plays, 73 yards, 3:07	10–21
3	5:24	California (PA)	Cody Nuzzo 21 yard field goal, Drive: 14 plays, 64 yards, 4:38	13–21
3	3:53	Slippery Rock	Brett Crenshaw 4 yard run (Kurt Brackman kick), Drive: 5 plays, 65 yards, 1:31	13–28
4	14:00	California (PA)	Mike Williams 2 yard pass from Cody Schroeder (Cody Nuzzo kick), Drive: 14 plays, 71 yards, 4:47	20–28
4	7:06	California (PA)	Jeff Knox Jr. 0 yd punt return (two-point pass conv. failed)	26–28

=== At Mercyhurst ===
California (PA) at Mercyhurst

Team	1	2	3	4	Total
Vulcans	0	7	0	0	7
• Lakers	7	24	9	0	40

- Date: November 3
- Location: Louis J. Tullio Field
  Erie, PA
- Game start: 12:00 PM EDT
- Elapsed time: 2:53
- Game attendance: 800
- Game weather: 40s • SE 10–15 • Partly cloudy
- Referee: Mike Zyglis

Scoring summary
1	8:49	Mercyhurst	Paris Bruner 48 yard pass from Anthony Vendemia (Steven Wakefield kick), Drive: 6 plays, 92 yards, 3:02	0–7
2	12:04	Mercyhurst	Allen Jones II 1 yard run (Steven Wakefield kick), Drive: 8 plays, 80 yards, 3:58	0–14
2	4:43	Mercyhurst	Brandon Brown-Dukes 3 yard run (Steven Wakefield kick), Drive: 10 plays, 64 yards, 6:24	0–21
2	4:26	Mercyhurst	Linnell Robinson 52 yard interception (Steven Wakefield kick)	0–28
2	1:45	California (PA)	Jeff Knox Jr. 1 yard run (Cody Nuzzo kick), Drive: 8 plays, 83 yards, 2:37	7–28
2	0:00	Mercyhurst	Steven Wakefield 44 yard field goal, Drive: 7 plays, 52 yards, 1:37	7–31
3	10:20	Mercyhurst	Brandon Brown-Dukes 13 yard run (Steven Wakefield kick failed), Drive: 3 plays, 53 yards, 1:36	7–37
3	8:20	Mercyhurst	Steven Wakefield 31 yard field goal, Drive: 4 plays, 6 yards, 1:54	7–40

=== Millersville ===
Millersville at California (PA)

Team	1	2	3	4	Total
Marauders	7	0	0	21	28
• Vulcans	21	21	0	14	56

- Date: November 10
- Location: Adamson Stadium
  California, PA
- Game start: 3:30 PM EST
- Elapsed time: 2:57
- Game attendance: 1,573
- Game weather: 65 °F (18 °C) • Partly cloudy
- Referee: Mike Serach

Scoring summary
1	14:49	California (PA)	Terrell Roberson 92 yard kickoff return (Cody Nuzzo kick)	7–0
1	11:25	California (PA)	Jeff Knox Jr. 4 yard run (Cody Nuzzo kick), Drive: 8 plays, 58 yards, 2:33	14–0
1	3:47	Millersvile	Ian Sadon 2 yard run (Anthony Kassab kick), Drive: 7 plays, 56 yards, 3:10	14–7
1	3:31	California (PA)	Mike Williams 68 yard pass from Peter Lalich (Cody Nuzzo kick), Drive: 1 plays, 68 yards, 0:10	21–7
2	9:21	California (PA)	Mike Williams 9 yard pass from Peter Lalich (Cody Nuzzo kick), Drive: 10 plays, 72 yards, 4:31	28–7
2	5:28	California (PA)	Mike Williams 39 yard pass from Peter Lalich (Cody Nuzzo kick), Drive: 3 plays, 51 yards, 1:15	35–7
2	1:01	California (PA)	Trey Johnson 30 yard pass from Peter Lalich (Cody Nuzzo kick), Drive: 7 plays, 75 yards, 1:38	42–7
4	13:46	Millersville	Dominic Sanders 10 yard pass from Ted Stachitas (Anthony Kassab kick), Drive: 12 plays, 80 yards, 4:50	42–14
4	11:27	California (PA)	Lamont Smith 20 yard run (Cody Nuzzo kick), Drive: 5 plays, 46 yards, 2:11	49–14
4	5:58	Millersville	Ian Sadon 2 yard run (Anthony Kassab kick), Drive: 12 plays, 77 yards, 5:22	49–21
4	4:20	California (PA)	Casey Teagarden 36 yard pass from Cody Schroeder (Cody Nuzzo kick), Drive: 3 plays, 47 yards, 1:30	56–21
4	0:46	Millersville	Ian Sadon 1 yard run (Anthony Kassab kick), Drive: 9 plays, 69 yards, 3:28	56–28
