= 2018 Mercyhurst Lakers football team =

College football season

2018 Mercyhurst Lakers football
- Conference: Pennsylvania State Athletic Conference
- West Division
- Record: 5–6 (3–4 PSAC)
- Head coach: Marty Schaetzle (18th season)
- Defensive coordinator: Dave Kotulski (2nd season)
- Home stadium: Tullio Field

2018 Pennsylvania State Athletic Conference football standings
	Conf.			Overall
Team	W		L	W		L
East
No. 17 West Chester xy$^	6	–	0	10	–	1
Kutztown ^	5	–	1	9	–	2
Bloomsburg	4	–	2	6	–	5
Shippensburg	3	–	3	6	–	5
Millersville	2	–	4	2	–	9
Lock Haven	1	–	5	2	–	9
East Stroudsburg	0	–	6	2	–	9
West
No. 12 Slippery Rock xy^	7	–	0	11	–	3
IUP	5	–	2	8	–	3
California (PA)	5	–	2	7	–	4
Edinboro	3	–	4	6	–	5
Mercyhurst	3	–	4	5	–	6
Clarion	2	–	5	4	–	7
Gannon	2	–	5	2	–	9
Seton Hill	1	–	6	1	–	10
Championship: West Chester 33, Slippery Rock 10
$ – Conference champion; x – Division champion/co-champions; y – Championship game participant; ^ – NCAA Division II playoff participant; Rankings from AFCA poll

The 2018 Mercyhurst Lakers football team represented Mercyhurst University as a member of the Pennsylvania State Athletic Conference (PSAC) during the 2018 NCAA Division II football season. The Lakers, led by 18th-year head coach Marty Schaetzle, played their home games at Tullio Field in Erie, Pennsylvania.

== Schedule ==
Date	Time	Opponent	Site	Result	Attendance	Source
September 1	7:00 p.m.	at Hillsdale*	Frank "Muddy" Waters Stadium; Hillsdale, MI	L 9–14	1,963	
September 8	12:00 p.m.	Tiffin*	Tullio Field; Erie, PA	L 20–24	1,274	
September 15	1:00 p.m.	Bloomsburg*	Tullio Field; Erie, PA	W 14–10	1,739	
September 22	4:00 p.m.	at No. 3 IUP	George P. Miller Stadium; Indiana, PA	L 7–34	3,406	
September 29	6:00 p.m.	at Slippery Rock	Mihalik-Thompson Stadium; Slippery Rock, PA	L 21–41	5,936	
October 6	12:00 p.m.	Edinboro	Tullio Field; Erie, PA	W 24–6	1,505	
October 13	12:00 p.m.	at Seton Hill	Offutt Field; Greensburg, PA	L 33–34	500	
October 20	12:00 p.m.	California (PA)	Tullio Field; Erie, PA	Suspended		
October 21	12:00 p.m.	California (PA)	Tullio Field; Erie, PA	L 0–23	1,082	
October 27	12:00 p.m.	at Gannon	McConnell Family Stadium; Erie, PA	W 38–21	1,001	
November 3	12:00 p.m.	Clarion	Tullio Field; Erie, PA	W 14–7	1,723	
November 10	1:00 p.m.	Millersville	Tullio Field; Erie, PA	W 35–14	834	
*Non-conference game; Rankings from DII Coaches Poll; All times are in Eastern time
