= 2012 North Alabama Lions football team =

American college football season

2012 North Alabama Lions football
- Conference: Gulf South Conference
- Record: 5–5 (2–3 GSC)
- Head coach: Bobby Wallace (11th season)
- Offensive coordinator: Cody Gross (1st season)
- Defensive coordinator: Chris Willis (1st season)
- Home stadium: Braly Municipal Stadium

2012 Gulf South Conference football standings
	Conf.			Overall
Team	W		L	W		L
No. 21 West Alabama $^	5	–	0	9	–	4
No. 1 Valdosta State ^	4	–	1	12	–	2
Shorter #	2	–	3	6	–	5
North Alabama	2	–	3	5	–	5
Delta State	1	–	4	3	–	7
West Georgia	1	–	4	3	–	7
$ – Conference champion; ^ – NCAA Division II playoff participant; # – Provisional NCAA Division II member; Rankings from AFCA poll

The 2012 North Alabama Lions football team represented the University of North Alabama as a member of the Gulf South Conference (GSC) during the 2012 NCAA Division II football season. Led by 11th-year head Bobby Wallace, the Lions compiled an overall record of 5–5 with a mark of 2–3 in conference play, placing fourth in the GCS. North Alabama failed to qualify for the NCAA Division II football championship playoffs first the first time since 2004, after seven straight appearances. The team played home games at Braly Municipal Stadium in Florence, Alabama.

Wallace returned to North Alabama for his second stint as head coach, having helmed the program from 1988 to 1997 before served as head football coach at Temple University and the University of West Alabama in the interim.

== Schedule ==
Date	Time	Opponent	Site	Result	Attendance
September 2		at Miles*	Legion Field; Birmingham, AL	W 31–30	22,268
September 8	6:00 p.m.	Harding*	Braly Municipal Stadium; Florence, AL	L 10–31	10,872
September 15		Kentucky Christian*	Braly Municipal Stadium; Florence, AL	W 39–0	10,913
September 22	6:00 p.m.	at Delta State	McCool Stadium; Cleveland, MS	W 20–12	8,943
September 29		Shorter	Braly Municipal Stadium; Florence, AL	W 41–0	9,323
October 6	7:00 p.m.	at Texas A&M–Kingsville*	Javelina Stadium; Kingsville, TX	W 21–16	9,468
October 13	6:00 p.m.	Valdosta State	Braly Municipal Stadium; Florence, AL	L 21–24	8,816
October 18	1:00 p.m.	at West Georgia	University Stadium; Carrollton, GA	L 23–38	3,602
November 3	3:00 p.m.	Tarleton State*	Braly Municipal Stadium; Florence, AL	L 28–38	9,067
November 8	6:30 p.m.	at West Alabama	Tiger Stadium; Livingston, AL (rivalry)	L 27–42	2,613
*Non-conference game; All times are in Central time
