= 2018 Pennsylvania State Athletic Conference football season =

- League: NCAA Division II Football
- Sport: Football
- Teams: 16
- TV partner(s): ESPN3, ESPNNews including multiple local broadcasting partners

Regular season

Seasons
- ← 2017 2019 →

2018 Pennsylvania State Athletic Conference football standings
	Conf.			Overall
Team	W		L	W		L
East
No. 17 West Chester xy$^	6	–	0	10	–	1
Kutztown ^	5	–	1	9	–	2
Bloomsburg	4	–	2	6	–	5
Shippensburg	3	–	3	6	–	5
Millersville	2	–	4	2	–	9
Lock Haven	1	–	5	2	–	9
East Stroudsburg	0	–	6	2	–	9
West
No. 12 Slippery Rock xy^	7	–	0	11	–	3
IUP	5	–	2	8	–	3
California (PA)	5	–	2	7	–	4
Edinboro	3	–	4	6	–	5
Mercyhurst	3	–	4	5	–	6
Clarion	2	–	5	4	–	7
Gannon	2	–	5	2	–	9
Seton Hill	1	–	6	1	–	10
Championship: West Chester 33, Slippery Rock 10
$ – Conference champion; x – Division champion/co-champions; y – Championship game participant; ^ – NCAA Division II playoff participant; Rankings from AFCA poll

The 2018 Pennsylvania State Athletic Conference football season was the 54th season of college football of the Pennsylvania State Athletic Conference (PSAC).

2018 was to be the year that the PSAC has partnered with ESPN. Approximately four to six PSAC football games were to be aired on ESPN2 ESPN3, ESPNews. The league also renewed the contract with Pennsylvania sports station PCN and entered into the first year of an agreement between AT&T SportsNet and schools in the West Division.

== Rankings ==
Legend
NR	Not ranked; not receiving votes
RV	Receiving votes
		Improvement in ranking
		Drop in ranking
		Not ranked previous week
		No change in ranking from previous week
		**All Rankings from AFCA Coaches and Regional Rankings polls**

		Pre	Wk 1	Wk 2	Wk 3	Wk 4	Wk 5	Wk 6	Wk 7	Wk 8	Wk 9	Wk 10	Wk 11	Final
Bloomsburg	AFCA Coaches													
Bloomsburg	Regional													
Cheyney	AFCA Coaches													
Cheyney	Regional													
East Stroudsburg	AFCA Coaches	NR	NR	NR	NR	NR	NR	NR	NR	NR	NR	NR	NR	NR
East Stroudsburg	Regional	NR	NR	NR	NR	NR	NR	NR	NR	NR	NR	NR	NR	NR
Kutztown	AFCA Coaches											NR	NR	RV
Kutztown	Regional											NR	NR	RV
Lock Haven	AFCA Coaches	NR												NR
Lock Haven	Regional	NR												NR
Millersville	AFCA Coaches													
Millersville	Regional													
Shippensburg	AFCA Coaches	NR												NR
Shippensburg	Regional	NR												NR
West Chester	AFCA Coaches													
West Chester	Regional													
California (PA)	AFCA Coaches									NR				
California (PA)	Regional									NR				
Clarion	AFCA Coaches	NR												NR
Clarion	Regional	NR												NR
Edinboro	AFCA Coaches													
Edinboro	Regional													
Gannon	AFCA Coaches	NR												
Gannon	Regional	NR												
Indiana (PA)	AFCA Coaches													
Indiana (PA)	Regional													
Mercyhurst	AFCA Coaches													
Mercyhurst	Regional													
Seton Hill	AFCA Coaches	NR	NR	NR	NR	NR	NR	NR	NR	NR	NR	NR	NR	NR
Seton Hill	Regional	NR	NR	NR	NR	NR	NR	NR	NR	NR	NR	NR	NR	NR
Slippery Rock	AFCA Coaches	NR	NR	NR	NR	NR	NR	NR	RV	RV	RV	25	24	23
Slippery Rock	Regional	NR	NR	NR	NR	NR	NR	RV	RV	RV	RV	24	24	24
