= 2012 Delta State Statesmen football team =

American college football season

2012 Delta State Statesmen football
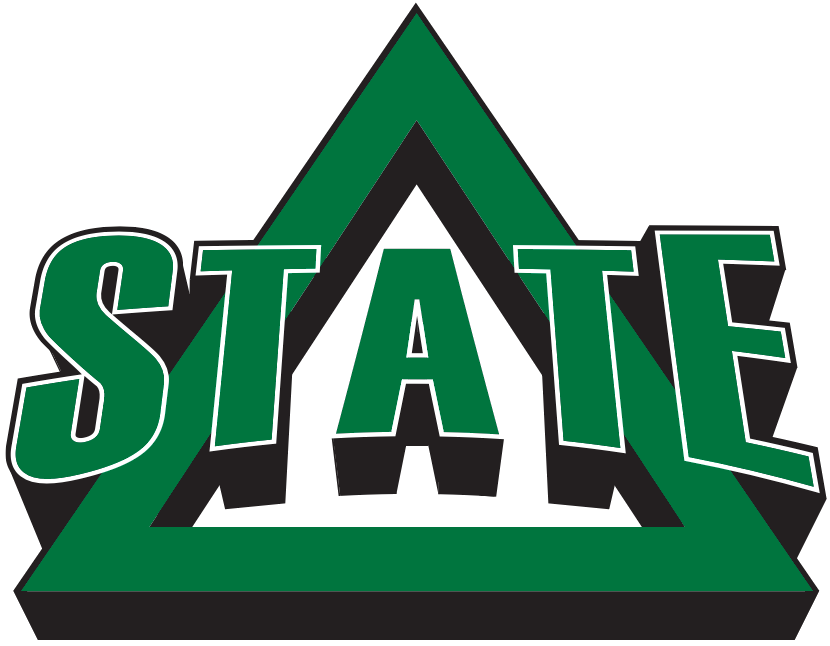
- Conference: Gulf South Conference
- Record: 3–7 (1–4 GSC)
- Head coach: Jamey Chadwell (1st season)
- Offensive coordinator: Gabe Giardina (1st season)
- Defensive coordinator: Chad Staggs (1st season)
- Home stadium: McCool Stadium

2012 Gulf South Conference football standings
	Conf.			Overall
Team	W		L	W		L
No. 21 West Alabama $^	5	–	0	9	–	4
No. 1 Valdosta State ^	4	–	1	12	–	2
Shorter #	2	–	3	6	–	5
North Alabama	2	–	3	5	–	5
Delta State	1	–	4	3	–	7
West Georgia	1	–	4	3	–	7
$ – Conference champion; ^ – NCAA Division II playoff participant; # – Provisional NCAA Division II member; Rankings from AFCA poll

The 2012 Delta State Statesmen football team represented Delta State University in the 2012 NCAA Division II football season as a member of the Gulf South Conference.

== Schedule ==
Date	Time	Opponent	Rank	Site	Result	Attendance	Source
September 1	12:06 p.m.	Fort Valley State*	No. 14	McCool Stadium; Cleveland, MS	L 23–31	6,321	
September 8	6:00 p.m.	at Elizabeth City State*	No. 22	Roebuck Stadium; Elizabeth City, NC	W 26–7	3,868	
September 22	6:00 p.m.	North Alabama	No. 25	McCool Stadium; Cleveland, MS	L 12–20	8,943	
September 27	6:36 p.m.	Abilene Christian		McCool Stadium; Cleveland, MS	L 28–34	5,123	
October 6	7:00 p.m.	at Tarleton State		Memorial Stadium; Stephenville, TX	W 38–35	2,218	
October 13	6:00 p.m.	West Georgia		McCool Stadium; Cleveland, MS	W 33–22	2,653	
October 20	3:00 p.m.	Valdosta State		Bazemore–Hyder Stadium; Valdosta, GA	L 41–59	6,672	
October 27	4:05 p.m.	No. 15 West Alabama^{†}		McCool Stadium; Cleveland, MS	L 7–37	3,210	
November 3	6:05 p.m.	at Indianapolis*		Key Stadium; Indianapolis, IN	L 18–33	3,232	
November 10	1:30 p.m.	at Shorter		Barron Stadium; Rome, GA	L 21–32		
*Non-conference game; ^{†}Homecoming; Rankings from AFCA Poll released prior to the game
