= Mike Kellar =

American football player and coach

Current position
- Title: Head coach
- Team: West Virginia Wesleyan
- Conference: MEC
- Record: 3–6

Biographical details
- Born: Shinnston, West Virginia, U.S.
- Education: Fairmont State University; West Virginia University

Playing career
- 1990–1991: Glenville State
- 1992–1993: Fairmont State
- Position: Quarterback

Coaching career (HC unless noted)
- 1994–2001: Fairmont State (OC/QB)
- 2002–2003: Northern Michigan (OC)
- 2004–2008: California (PA) (OC)
- 2009–2010: Concord
- 2011: California (PA) (associate HC)
- 2012–2015: California (PA)
- 2016–2017: Lenoir–Rhyne
- 2018: West Liberty (OC)
- 2019–2025: Glenville State
- 2026–present: West Virginia Wesleyan

Head coaching record
- Overall: 90–73

Mike Kellar is an American college football coach and former player. He is the head football coach for West Virginia Wesleyan College, a position he had held since 2025. Kellar previously served as the head football coach at Concord University in Athens, West Virginia (2009–2010), California University of Pennsylvania (2012–2015), Lenoir–Rhyne University in Hickory, North Carolina (2016–2017), and Glenville State University in Glenville, West Virginia (2019–2025).

== Head coaching record ==
Year	Team	Overall	Conference	Standing	Bowl/playoffs
Concord Mountain Lions (West Virginia Intercollegiate Athletic Conference) (2009–2010)
2009	Concord	6–5	4–4	5th	
2010	Concord	8–3	5–3	4th	
Concord:		14–8	9–7		
California Vulcans (Pennsylvania State Athletic Conference) (2012–2015)
2012	California	8–3	5–2	3rd (West)	
2013	California	7–4	4–3	T–3rd (West)	
2014	California	8–2	6–2	T–3rd (West)	
2015	California	8–3	5–2	3rd (West)	
California:		31–12	20–9		
Lenoir–Rhyne Bears (South Atlantic Conference) (2016–2017)
2016	Lenoir–Rhyne	3–8	3–4	T–4th	
2017	Lenoir–Rhyne	3–7	2–5	7th	
Lenoir–Rhyne:		6–15	5–9		
Glenville State Pioneers (Mountain East Conference) (2019–2025)
2019	Glenville State	7–4	6–4	6th	
2020–21	Glenville State	0–4	0–4	6th (South)	
2021	Glenville State	3–7	3–7	10th	
2022	Glenville State	7–4	6–4	T–4th	
2023	Glenville State	6–4	5–4	6th	
2024	Glenville State	7–4	7–2	2nd	
2025	Glenville State	6–5	5–3	T–3rd	
Glenville State:		36–32	32–28		
West Virginia Wesleyan Bobcats (Mountain East Conference) (2026–present)
2026	West Virginia Wesleyan	3–6	2–4		
West Virginia Wesleyan:		3–6	2–4		
Total:		90–73			
