= 2012 Winston-Salem State Rams football team =

American college football season

2012 Winston-Salem State Rams football

Black college national champion CIAA champion

CIAA Championship Game, W 34–19 vs. Elizabeth City State

NCAA Division II Championship Game, L 7–35 vs. Valdosta State
- Conference: Central Intercollegiate Athletic Association

Ranking
- AFCA: No. 2
- Record: 14–1 (7–0 CIAA)
- Head coach: Connell Maynor (3rd season)
- Home stadium: Bowman Gray Stadium

2012 Central Intercollegiate Athletic Association football standings
	Conf.			Overall
Team	W		L	W		L
Northern Division
Elizabeth City State # xy	6	–	1	8	–	4
Chowan	5	–	2	6	–	4
Virginia Union	3	–	4	5	–	5
Virginia State	3	–	4	4	–	6
Bowie State	2	–	5	5	–	5
Lincoln (PA)	1	–	6	1	–	9
Southern Division
No. 2 Winston-Salem State xy$^	7	–	0	14	–	1
Johnson C. Smith	5	–	2	6	–	4
St. Augustine's	4	–	3	6	–	4
Shaw	3	–	4	4	–	6
Livingstone	2	–	5	2	–	8
Fayetteville State	1	–	6	2	–	8
Championship: Winston-Salem State 34, Elizabeth City State 19
$ – Conference champion; x – Division champion/co-champions; y – Championship game participant; ^ – NCAA Division II playoff participant; # – Pioneer Bowl participant; Rankings from AFCA poll

The 2012 Winston-Salem State Rams football team represented Winston-Salem State University as a member of the Central Intercollegiate Athletic Association (CIAA) during the 2012 NCAA Division II football season. Led by third-year head coach Connell Maynor, the Rams compiled an overall record of 14–1, with a conference record of 7–0, and finished as CIAA champion. At the conclusion of the season, Winston-Salem State were also recognized as black college national champion.

== Schedule ==
Date	Time	Opponent	Rank	Site	Result	Attendance	Source
September 1	6:00 p.m.	UNC Pembroke*	No. 9	Bowman Gray Stadium; Winston-Salem, NC	W 28–23	4,337	
September 8	1:00 p.m.	at Concord*	No. 8	Callaghan Stadium; Athens, WV	W 30–22	1,112	
September 15	12:00 p.m.	vs. Morehouse*	No. 5	Cleveland Browns Stadium; Cleveland, OH (Cleveland Classic)	W 55–21	10,000	
September 22	6:00 p.m.	Virginia Union	No. 5	Bowman Gray Stadium; Winston-Salem, NC	W 35–6	6,133	
September 29	1:00 p.m.	at Bowie State	No. 5	Bulldogs Stadium; Bowie, MD	W 35–3	2,964	
October 6	4:00 p.m.	at Johnson C. Smith	No. 4	American Legion Memorial Stadium; Charlotte, NC	W 63–7	6,147	
October 13	1:30 p.m.	St. Augustine's^{†}	No. 3	Bowman Gray Stadium; Winston-Salem, NC	W 56–37	9,321	
October 20	1:30 p.m.	Livingstone	No. 2	Bowman Gray Stadium; Winston-Salem, NC	W 58–0	17,123	
October 27	1:00 p.m.	at Shaw	No. 2	Durham County Memorial Stadium; Durham, NC	W 62–31	2,561	
November 3	1:30 p.m.	at Fayetteville State	No. 2	Luther "Nick" Jeralds Stadium; Fayetteville, NC	W 41–8	3,732	
November 10	1:00 p.m.	vs. Elizabeth City State	No. 2	Durham County Memorial Stadium; Durham, NC (CIAA Championship Game)	W 34–19	6,673	
November 24	12:00 p.m.	No. 15 Shippensburg*	No. 2	Bowman Gray Stadium; Winston-Salem, NC (NCAA Division II Second Round)	W 37–14	3,248	
December 1	12:00 p.m.	No. 11 IUP*	No. 2	Bowman Gray Stadium; Winston-Salem, NC (NCAA Division II Quarterfinal)	W 21–17	5,212	
December 8	6:30 p.m.	No. 16 West Texas A&M*	No. 2	Bowman Gray Stadium; Winston-Salem, NC (NCAA Division II Semifinal)	W 41–18	8,612	
December 15	1:00 p.m.	vs. No. 17 Valdosta State*	No. 2	Braly Municipal Stadium; Florence, AL (NCAA Division II Championship Game)	L 7–35	7,527	
*Non-conference game; ^{†}Homecoming; Rankings from AFCA Poll released prior to the game
