= Gary Dunn (American football coach) =

American football player and coach

Current position
- Title: Head coach
- Team: California (PA)
- Conference: PSAC
- Record: 75–28

Biographical details
- Born: 1973 or 1974 (age 52–53); Pittsburgh, Pennsylvania, U.S.

Playing career
- 1991–1994: California (PA)
- Position: Offensive lineman

Coaching career (HC unless noted)
- 1995: California (PA) (GA)
- 1996–1997: Morehead State (OL/TE)
- 1998–2008: Morehead State (OC)
- 2009–2015: Duquesne (OC)
- 2016–present: California (PA)

Head coaching record
- Overall: 75–28
- Tournaments: 4–4 (NCAA D-II playoffs)

Accomplishments and honors

Championships
- 1 PSAC (2016); 3 PSAC West Division (2016, 2021, 2024)

Gary Dunn is an American college football coach. He is the head football coach for California University of Pennsylvania, a position he has held since 2016. In his first season as head coach, in 2016, he led the California Vulcans to a Pennsylvania State Athletic Conference (PSAC) championship and a birth in the NCAA Division II Football Championship.

== Coaching career ==
While at Morehead State, Dunn served as the offensive coordinator for 11 seasons after spending two seasons as the offensive line and tight ends coach. In 2000, the Morehead State Eagles led the NCAA Division I Football Championship Subdivision (FCS) with 41.6 points and 523.9 yards of total offense behind the play of quarterback Dave Dinkins, a native of Pittsburgh. Morehead State matched the winningest season in school history in 2002, finishing with a 9–3 overall record behind an offense that ranked ninth in the country with 425.7 yards of total offense per game.

In 2011, the Duquesne Dukes registered their winningest season in nearly a decade with a 9–2 mark. Duquesne led the Northeast Conference (NEC) with 212.8 rushing yards per game and ranked second in the league with 33.7 points and 415.3 yards of total offense per game.

In 2015, the Dukes finished with an 8–4 overall record and made the program's first appearance in the FCS playoffs. Dunn worked with the top-ranked offense in the (NEC), as Duquesne led the league with 30.7 points, 416.5 yards of total offense, 171.8 rushing yards and 244.8 passing yards per game. Dunn helped Duquesne post a winning season five times in his six years with the program, while earning at least a share of three NEC titles (2011, 2013, 2015).

== Head coaching record ==
Year	Team	Overall	Conference	Standing	Bowl/playoffs	AFCA^{#}	D2^{°}
California Vulcans (Pennsylvania State Athletic Conference) (2016–present)
2016	California	11–1	7–0	1st (West)	L NCAA Division II Quarterfinal	6	
2017	California	9–3	5–2	2nd (West)	L NCAA Division II First Round		
2018	California	7–4	5–2	T–2nd (West)			
2019	California	7–4	5–2	3rd (West)			
2020–21	No team—COVID-19						
2021	California	9–1	5–1	T–1st (West)		21	
2022	California	6–5	4–3	4th (West)			
2023	California	7–3	6–1	2nd (West)			
2024	California	10–3	6–0	1st (West)	L NCAA Division II Quarterfinal	12	10
2025	California	9–4	3–3	T–3rd (West)	L NCAA Division II Second Round	22	21
California:		75–28	46–14				
Total:		75–28					
National championship Conference title Conference division title or championship game berth
