= 2012 Valdosta State Blazers football team =

American college football season

2012 Valdosta State Blazers football

NCAA Division II champion

NCAA Division II Championship Game, W 35–7 vs. Winston–Salem
- Conference: Gulf South Conference

Ranking
- AFCA: No. 1
- Record: 12–2 (4–1 GSC)
- Head coach: David Dean (6th season)
- Offensive coordinator: Robby Brown (4th season)
- Co-defensive coordinators: Earl Chambers (1st season); Seth Wallace (3rd season)
- Home stadium: Bazemore–Hyder Stadium

2012 Gulf South Conference football standings
	Conf.			Overall
Team	W		L	W		L
No. 21 West Alabama $^	5	–	0	9	–	4
No. 1 Valdosta State ^	4	–	1	12	–	2
Shorter #	2	–	3	6	–	5
North Alabama	2	–	3	5	–	5
Delta State	1	–	4	3	–	7
West Georgia	1	–	4	3	–	7
$ – Conference champion; ^ – NCAA Division II playoff participant; # – Provisional NCAA Division II member; Rankings from AFCA poll

The 2012 Valdosta State Blazers football team represented Valdosta State University as a member of the a member of the Gulf South Conference during the 2012 NCAA Division II football season. They were led by sixth-year head coach David Dean and played their home games at Bazemore–Hyder Stadium in Valdosta, Georgia. After a 2–2 start, Valdosta State won their next 10 games and defeated Winston–Salem, 35–7, in the title game of the NCAA Division II National Football Championship. The championship was the school's seventh national title, and the third in football. Dean was recognized as the AFCA Division II Coach of the Year. The national championship was Dean's second at Valdosta State, having led the Blazers to the NCAA Division II title in 2007, his first year as head coach. The Blazers finished the season 12–2 overall and 4–1 in conference play, placing second in the Gulf South behind West Alabama, who beat Valdosta State in regular season, but then fell to the Blazers in the second round of the NCAA Division II playoffs.

== Schedule ==
Date	Time	Opponent	Rank	Site	TV	Result	Attendance
September 1	7:00 p.m.	at Saginaw Valley State*	No. 8	Wickes Stadium; University Center, MI		L 28–24	4,891
September 8	7:00 p.m.	Fort Valley State*	No. 20	Bazemore–Hyder Stadium; Valdosta, GA		W 62–14	5,298
September 15	1:00 p.m.	vs. Angelo State*	No. 18	Cowboys Stadium; Arlington, TX (Lone Star Football Festival)		W 43–10	
September 22	7:00 p.m.	No. 23 West Alabama	No. 16	Bazemore–Hyder Stadium; Valdosta, GA		L 28–39	5,783
September 29	7:00 p.m.	Edward Waters*		Bazemore–Hyder Stadium; Valdosta, GA		W 58–10	4,728
October 6	2:00 p.m.	West Georgia		University Stadium; Carrollton, GA (rivalry)		W 42–7	7,644
October 13	7:00 p.m.	at North Alabama		Braly Municipal Stadium; Florence, AL		W 24–21	8,816
October 20	3:00 p.m.	Delta State^{†}		Bazemore–Hyder Stadium; Valdosta, GA		W 59–41	6,672
October 25	7:30 p.m.	at Shorter		Brannon Stadium; Rome, GA	GSC–TV LIVE	W 37–6	3,800
November 1	7:30 p.m.	Texas A&M–Kingsville*	No. 24	Bazemore–Hyder Stadium; Valdosta, GA	GSC–TV LIVE	W 38–31	3,711
November 24	12:00 p.m.	West Alabama*	No. 17	Bazemore–Hyder Stadium; Valdosta, GA (NCAA Division II Second Round)		W 49–21	1,984
December 1	12:00 p.m.	No. 22 Carson–Newman*	No. 17	Bazemore–Hyder Stadium; Valdosta, GA (NCAA Division II Quarterfinal)		W 48–26	3,699
December 8	3:00 p.m.	No. 5 Minnesota State*	No. 17	Blakeslee Stadium; Mankato, MN (NCAA Division II Semifinal)	ESPN3	W 35–19	3,356
December 15	1:00 p.m.	No. 2 Winston–Salem*	No. 17	Braly Municipal Stadium; Florence, AL (NCAA Division II Championship Game)	ESPN2, ESPN3	W 35–7	7,527
*Non-conference game; ^{†}Homecoming; Rankings from American Football Coaches Association Poll released prior to the game; All times are in Eastern time
