= Marty Schaetzle =

American football coach

Playing career

Football
- 1980–1982: Bucknell

Baseball
- 1983: Bucknell
- Positions: Offensive lineman (football); Catcher (baseball)

Coaching career (HC unless noted)

Football
- 1983: Albany (GA)
- 1984–1985: Arizona (GA)
- 1986–1988: Sonoma State (OC/OL)
- 1989: Northern Arizona (OL)
- 1990–1996: Shippensburg (assistant)
- 1997–2001: Bucknell (assistant)
- 2002–2021: Mercyhurst

Head coaching record
- Overall: 97–114
- Tournaments: 1–1 (NCAA D-II playoffs)

Accomplishments and honors

Championships
- 1 PSAC (2010); 2 PSAC Western Division (2010, 2012)

Martin Schaetzle is an American former college football coach. He served as the head football coach at Mercyhurst University in Erie, Pennsylvania from 2002 to 2021, compiling a record of 97–114.

Schaetzle played high school football at St. Francis Preparatory School in Queens and college football at Bucknell University in Lewisburg, Pennsylvania. He was co-captain of the 1982 Bucknell Bison football team. After graduating from Bucknell in 1983, Schaetzle earned a master's degree in business education at University at Albany, SUNY, where he also worked as an assistant football coach. He was a graduate assistant at the University of Arizona from 1984 to 1985 before moving to Sonoma State University in 1986 as an assistant football coach. Schaetzle spent 1989 as offensive line coach at Northern Arizona University. He returned to Pennsylvania when he was hired in March 1990 as an assistant coach at Shippensburg University of Pennsylvania under head football coach Rocky Rees.

== Head coaching record ==
Year	Team	Overall	Conference	Standing	Bowl/playoffs	AFCA^{#}
Mercyhurst Lakers (Great Lakes Intercollegiate Athletic Conference) (2002–2007)
2002	Mercyhurst	2–9	1–9	12th		
2003	Mercyhurst	5–6	4–6	T–8th		
2004	Mercyhurst	4–7	4–6	T–7th		
2005	Mercyhurst	3–7	3–7	T–9th		
2006	Mercyhurst	3–7	3–7	T–10th		
2007	Mercyhurst	4–7	3–7	T–10th		
Mercyhurst Lakers (Pennsylvania State Athletic Conference) (2008–2021)
2008	Mercyhurst	7–4	5–2	T–2nd (West)		
2009	Mercyhurst	4–7	3–4	T–4th (West)		
2010	Mercyhurst	10–3	6–1	T–1st (West)	L NCAA Division II Quarterfinal	11
2011	Mercyhurst	4–7	2–5	T–6th (West)		
2012	Mercyhurst	9–2	6–1	T–1st (West)		
2013	Mercyhurst	7–4	4–3	T–3rd (West)		
2014	Mercyhurst	7–4	6–3	T–3rd (West)		
2015	Mercyhurst	5–6	2–5	T–6th (West)		
2016	Mercyhurst	3–8	1–6	T–7th (West)		
2017	Mercyhurst	5–6	3–4	T–5th (West)		
2018	Mercyhurst	5–6	3–4	T–4th (West)		
2019	Mercyhurst	6–5	3–4	T–4th (West)		
2020–21	Mercyhurst	0–2	0–0	N/A		
2021	Mercyhurst	4–7	3–4	T–4th (West)		
Mercyhurst:		97–114	65–88			
Total:		97–114				
National championship Conference title Conference division title or championship game berth
