= Coal Bowl =

American college football rivalry

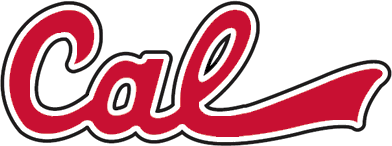
- California Vulcans IUP Crimson Hawks
- Sport: Football
- First meeting: October 17, 1908; Tie, 0–0
- Latest meeting: October 24, 2026; Cal U, 49–0
- Next meeting: 2027
- Trophy: Coal Miners Pail Trophy

Statistics
- Total meetings: 101
- All-time series: IUP leads, 66–32–3
- Trophy series: Cal U leads, 11–6
- Largest victory: IUP, 69–0 (1912)
- Longest win streak: IUP, 20 (1985–2004)
- Current win streak: Cal U, 1 (2026–present)
- Locations in Pennsylvania

The Coal Bowl is an American college football game between Pennsylvania Western University California and Indiana University of Pennsylvania. The two universities, both members of the Pennsylvania State System of Higher Education and the Pennsylvania State Athletic Conference (PSAC). The two universities first competed in 1918. The name was added to the rivalry in 2009. The winner will earn the Coal Miners Pail Trophy, sponsored by the Pennsylvania Coal Association.

The trophy was established by brothers Barry "Buck" and Bob Lippencott. Buck played football at Indiana (IUP) and Bob played at California, competing against each other in 1963 and 1964. The brothers made a donation to their universities to establish an athletic scholarship. In addition, proceeds from sponsorship of the Pennsylvania Coal Association will be split between the two schools.

== Game results ==
Cal U victories	IUP victories	Tie games	Forfeits

No.	Date	Location	Winning team		Losing team	
1	1908	California, PA	Tie	0	Tie	0
2	1912		IUP	69	Cal U	0
3	1918		IUP	20	Cal U	2
4	1918		IUP	19	Cal U	16
5	1919		IUP	21	Cal U	0
6	1921		Cal U	14	IUP	0
7	1922	Indiana, PA	IUP	6	Cal U	0
8	1927		Cal U	18	IUP	0
9	1928	Indiana, PA	IUP	6	Cal U	0
10	1929	California, PA	IUP	12	Cal U	7
11	1930	Indiana, PA	IUP	8	Cal U	6
12	1931	California, PA	Tie	0	Tie	0
13	1932	Indiana, PA	Cal U	9	IUP	8
14	1933	California, PA	Cal U	7	IUP	0
15	1934	Indiana, PA	IUP	41	Cal U	7
16	1935	California, PA	IUP	17	Cal U	6
17	1936	Indiana, PA	IUP	20	Cal U	0
18	1937	California, PA	IUP	19	Cal U	0
19	1939	Brownsville, PA	IUP	19	Cal U	6
20	1940	Indiana, PA	IUP	33	Cal U	0
21	1946	California, PA	Cal U	18	IUP	6
22	1947	Indiana, PA	IUP	27	Cal U	7
23	1948	California, PA	Cal U	14	IUP	12
24	1949	Indiana, PA	Cal U	27	IUP	7
25	1950	California, PA	IUP	20	Cal U	0
26	1951	Indiana, PA	IUP	13	Cal U	6
27	1952	California, PA	Cal U	28	IUP	19
28	1953	Indiana, PA	IUP	28	Cal U	20
29	1954	California, PA	Cal U	18	IUP	7
30	1955	Indiana, PA	IUP	14	Cal U	7
31	1956	California, PA	IUP	6	Cal U	0
32	1957	Indiana, PA	IUP	14	Cal U	13
33	1958	California, PA	Cal U	13	IUP	0
34	1959	Indiana, PA	Cal U	18	IUP	7
35	1960	California, PA	Cal U	33	IUP	14
36	1961	Indiana, PA	Cal U	13	IUP	7
37	1962	Indiana, PA	Tie	14	Tie	14
38	1963	California, PA	IUP	7	Cal U	0
39	1964	Indiana, PA	IUP	26	Cal U	13
40	1965	California, PA	IUP	43	Cal U	27
41	1966	Indiana, PA	IUP	24	Cal U	0
42	1967	California, PA	Cal U	27	IUP	20
43	1968	Indiana, PA	IUP	41	Cal U	0
44	1969	California, PA	IUP	46	Cal U	6
45	1970	Indiana, PA	Cal U	14	IUP	6
46	1971	California, PA	IUP	34	Cal U	0
47	1972	Indiana, PA	IUP	28	Cal U	14
48	1973	California, PA	IUP	34	Cal U	28
49	1974	Indiana, PA	IUP	20	Cal U	0
50	1975	California, PA	IUP	35	Cal U	26
51	1976	Indiana, PA	IUP	16	Cal U	0
52	1977	California, PA	IUP	47	Cal U	7

No.	Date	Location	Winning team		Losing team	
53	1978	Indiana, PA	IUP	28	Cal U	6
54	1979	California, PA	IUP	38	Cal U	16
55	1980	Indiana, PA	IUP	28	Cal U	14
56	1981	California, PA	Cal U	35	IUP	16
57	1982	Indiana, PA	Cal U^{†}	24	IUP	10
58	1983	California, PA	IUP	35	Cal U	21
59	1984	Indiana, PA	Cal U	31	IUP	14
60	1985	California, PA	IUP	28	Cal U	0
61	1986	Indiana, PA	IUP	39	Cal U	0
62	1987	California, PA	IUP	24	Cal U	0
63	1988	Indiana, PA	IUP	34	Cal U	0
64	1989	California, PA	IUP	17	Cal U	14
65	1990	Indiana, PA	IUP	42	Cal U	15
66	1991	California, PA	IUP	10	Cal U	8
67	1992	Indiana, PA	IUP	36	Cal U	20
68	1993	California, PA	IUP	52	Cal U	13
69	1994	Indiana, PA	IUP	62	Cal U	33
70	1995	California, PA	IUP	44	Cal U	20
71	1996	Indiana, PA	IUP	42	Cal U	6
72	1997	California, PA	IUP	20	Cal U	10
73	1998	California, PA	IUP	31	Cal U	0
74	1999	Indiana, PA	IUP	42	Cal U	14
75	2000	California, PA	IUP	24	IUP	7
76	2001	Indiana, PA	IUP	41	Cal U	0
77	2002	Indiana, PA	IUP	20	Cal U	9
78	2003	California, PA	IUP	14	Cal U	7
79	2004	California, PA	IUP	35	Cal U	23
80	2005	Indiana, PA	Cal U	38	IUP	23
81	2006	California, PA	IUP	21	Cal U	17
82	2007	Indiana, PA	Cal U	38	IUP	12
83	2008	California, PA	Cal U	21	IUP	19
84	2009	Indiana, PA	Cal U	41	IUP	28
85	2010	California, PA	Cal U	18	IUP	15^{OT}
86	2011	Indiana, PA	Cal U	28	IUP	10
87	2012	California, PA	Cal U	26	IUP	24
88	2013	Indiana, PA	IUP	20	Cal U	7
89	2014	California, PA	Cal U	21	IUP	13
90	2015	Indiana, PA	IUP	20	Cal U	15
91	2016	California, PA	Cal U	31	IUP	28
92	2016^	California, PA	Cal U	44	IUP	23
93	2017	Indiana, PA	IUP	26	Cal U	10
94	2018	California, PA	Cal U	36	IUP	24
95	2019	Indiana, PA	IUP	17	Cal U	6
96	2021	Indiana, PA	Cal U	38	IUP	34
97	2022	California, PA	IUP	22	Cal U	21
98	2023	Indiana, PA	Cal U	30	IUP	20
99	2024	California, PA	Cal U	16	IUP	13^{OT}
100	2025	Indiana, PA	IUP	38	Cal U	30
101	2026	California, PA	Cal U	49	IUP	0
Series: IUP leads 66–32–3
† Cal U forfeited win.^Coal Miners Pail Trophy was not at stake in the 2016 playoff game.

== See also ==
- List of NCAA college football rivalry games
