= Hepner–Bailey Field at Adamson Stadium =

American football stadium in California, Pennsylvania

Coordinates: 40.0491191°N 79.8991656°W

Adamson Stadium
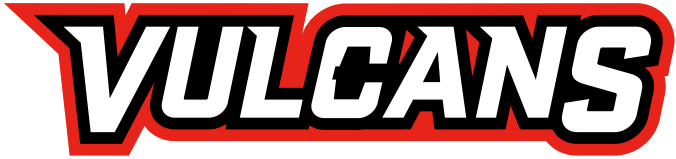

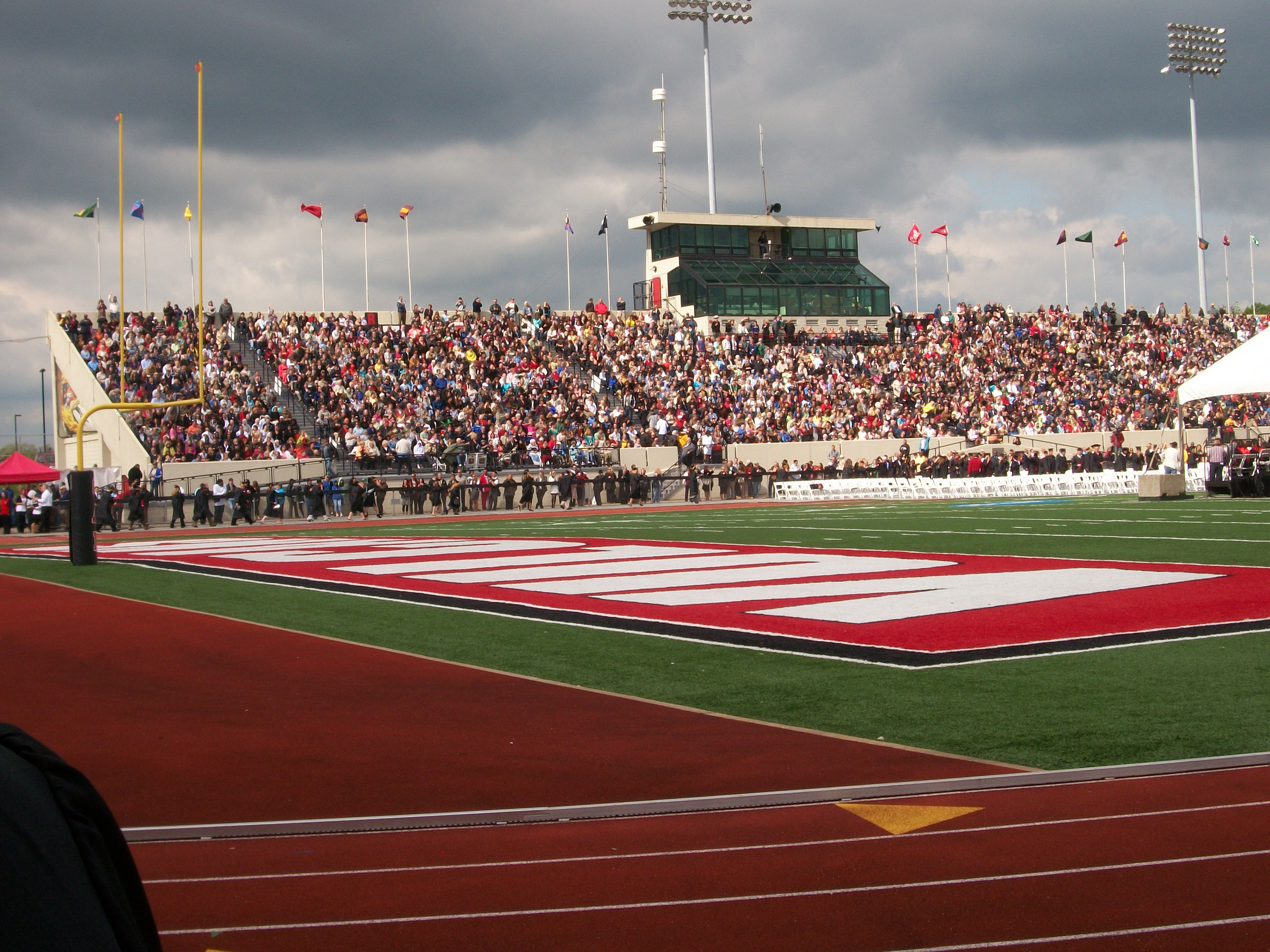
- The stadium from field level during 2010 graduation ceremonies
- Interactive map of Adamson Stadium
- Full name: Hepner-Bailey Field at Adamson Stadium
- Former names: James Adamson Stadium
- Address: California, PA; United States
- Owner: Pennsylvania Western University
- Operator: PennWest California
- Capacity: 6,500
- Type: Stadium
- Surface: ProGrass
- Current use: Football

Construction
- Opened: September 19, 1971; 55 years ago

Tenant
- California Vulcans football (NCAA D-II)

Website
- calvulcans.com/adamson-stadium

Hepner–Bailey Field at Adamson Stadium is an American football stadium, located in California, Pennsylvania on the campus of Pennsylvania Western University, California (PennWest California; known before July 2022 as California University of Pennsylvania, or Cal U). The stadium has a 6,500 seat capacity. In 2006, the playing field was renamed for two of California University's distinguished alumni and most recognizable athletic figures, Bill Hepner and Mitch Bailey. Adamson Stadium includes an eight-lane all-weather track, as well as field facilities which were renovated in 2002. The stadium includes a two-level press box that can accommodate radio and television broadcasters as well as two large varsity locker rooms, two sets of public restrooms, concession stand, scoreboard with message board capabilities, ticket booths, training room and an equipment room. Just outside Adamson Stadium is the area for track & field throwing events (javelin, discus, shot put and hammer).

PennWest California's television station, CUTV, as well as WCAL 91.9 FM broadcasts most Vulcan football games from Adamson Stadium. Root Sports Pittsburgh has carried a couple games per season from the stadium as well. In 2007, ESPNU televised the National Semi-final game live from Adamson Stadium

In 2007, the stadium hosted its first three NCAA-DII Football Playoff games, including the Northeast Regional Championship and the National Semi-final game in which California fell to Valdosta State 28–24. The stadium also hosted an NCAA National Semi-final game in 2008. California was again defeated, this time by Minnesota Duluth, 45–7.

The stadium, as well as the surrounding Roadman Park, are undergoing renovations. The former baseball field, adjacent to Adamson Stadium, has been replaced with a larger parking lot that spans the entire 'home side' of the stadium. Also, a new concession stand has been built to better serve the spectators at Adamson. Before the start of the 2009 season, a WaveCam was installed for permanent use at Adamson Stadium, the WaveCam has since been dismantled and is no longer in use. A color video board was also installed before the start of the 2009 season.
