= 2022 BC Lions season =

CFL team season

- General manager: Rick Campbell; Neil McEvoy
- President: Rick LeLacheur
- Head coach: Rick Campbell
- Home stadium: BC Place Stadium

Results
- Record: 12–6
- Division place: 2nd, West
- Playoffs: Lost West Final
- Team MOP: Nathan Rourke
- Team MODP: Garry Peters
- Team MOC: Nathan Rourke
- Team MOOL: Joel Figueroa
- Team MOST: Sean Whyte
- Team MOR: Emmanuel Rugamba

Uniform

The 2022 BC Lions season was the 64th season for the team in the Canadian Football League (CFL) and their 68th overall. The Lions improved upon their 5–9 record from 2021, with their sixth win in their seventh game. The team then qualified for the playoffs following losses by both the Hamilton Tiger-Cats and the Ottawa Redblacks, in week 16, on September 24, 2022. The Lions clinched a home playoff game on October 22, 2022, for the first time since the 2016 season, following their Week 20 win over the Edmonton Elks. However, after defeating the Calgary Stampeders in the West Semi-Final, the team lost to the Winnipeg Blue Bombers in the West Final.

The 2022 season was the second season with Rick Campbell as the team's head coach and the second season with Campbell and Neil McEvoy as co-general managers.

== Offseason ==
=== CFL global draft ===
The 2022 CFL global draft took place on May 3, 2022. With the format being a snake draft, the Lions selected third in the odd-numbered rounds and seventh in the even-numbered rounds.

Round	Pick	Player	Position	University/Club Team	Nationality
1	3	Karlis Brauns	DL	Panthers Wrocław	Latvia
2	16	Marcel Dabo	DB	Stuttgart Surge	Germany
3	21	John-Levi Kruse	FB	Hamburg Sea Devils	Germany

== CFL national draft ==
The 2022 CFL draft took place on May 3, 2022. The Lions had the third selection in each of the eight rounds of the draft after recording the third-worst record in 2021. The Lions obtained another third-round pick after trading the rights for Sergio Castillo to the Winnipeg Blue Bombers.

Round	Pick	Player	Position	School	Hometown
1	3	Nathan Cherry	DL	Saskatchewan	Saskatoon, SK
2	12	Noah Zerr	OL	Saskatchewan	Langenburg, SK
3	23	Joshua Archibald	DL	McGill	Montreal, QC
3	29	Ryder Varga	LB	Regina	Regina, SK
4	32	Adrian Greene	DB	Saint Mary's	Toronto, ON
5	41	Riley Pickett	DL	Saskatchewan	Saskatoon, SK
6	50	Fredenick Eveillard	WR	Ottawa	Gatineau, QC
7	59	John Metchie III	WR	Alabama	Brampton, ON
8	68	Adam Wallace	DL	Ottawa	North Bay, ON

== Preseason ==
=== Schedule ===
Week	Game	Date	Kickoff	Opponent	Results		TV	Venue	Attendance	Summary
Week	Game	Date	Kickoff	Opponent	Score	Record	TV	Venue	Attendance	Summary
A	1	Sat, May 28	1:00 p.m. PDT	at Calgary Stampeders	L 6–41	0–1	None	McMahon Stadium	18,440	Recap
B	2	Fri, June 3	7:00 p.m. PDT	vs. Saskatchewan Roughriders	W 20–18	1–1	TSN	BC Place		Recap

# Games played with colour uniforms.

== Regular season ==
=== Standings ===
West Division
Team	GP	W	L	T	Pts	PF	PA	Div	Stk	
Winnipeg Blue Bombers	18	15	3	0	30	538	370	10–1	W1	Details
BC Lions	18	12	6	0	24	525	405	8–4	L1	Details
Calgary Stampeders	18	12	6	0	24	533	373	7–5	W2	Details
Saskatchewan Roughriders	18	6	12	0	12	370	440	3–8	L7	Details
Edmonton Elks	18	4	14	0	8	354	599	1–11	L4	Details

=== Schedule ===
Week	Game	Date	Kickoff	Opponent	Results		TV	Venue	Attendance	Summary
Week	Game	Date	Kickoff	Opponent	Score	Record	TV	Venue	Attendance	Summary
1	1	Sat, June 11	7:00 p.m. PDT	vs. Edmonton Elks	W 59–15	1–0	TSN	BC Place	34,082	Recap
2	Bye									
3	2	Sat, June 25	7:00 p.m. PDT	vs. Toronto Argonauts	W 44–3	2–0	TSN/ESPN2	BC Place	14,006	Recap
4	3	Thu, June 30	4:30 p.m. PDT	at Ottawa Redblacks	W 34–31	3–0	TSN/RDS/ESPN2	TD Place Stadium	20,132	Recap
5	4	Sat, July 9	4:00 p.m. PDT	vs. Winnipeg Blue Bombers	L 22–43	3–1	TSN/ESPNews	BC Place	17,603	Recap
6	Bye									
7	5	Thu, July 21	7:00 p.m. PDT	vs. Hamilton Tiger-Cats	W 17–12	4–1	TSN	BC Place	16,155	Recap
8	6	Fri, Jul 29	6:00 p.m. PDT	at Saskatchewan Roughriders	W 32–17	5–1	TSN/ESPN2	Mosaic Stadium	27,283	Recap
9	7	Sat, Aug 6	7:00 p.m. PDT	vs. Edmonton Elks	W 46–14	6–1	TSN/ESPN2	BC Place	16,342	Recap
10	8	Sat, Aug 13	4:00 p.m. PDT	at Calgary Stampeders	W 41–40	7–1	TSN	McMahon Stadium	22,229	Recap
11	9	Fri, Aug 19	7:00 p.m. PDT	at Saskatchewan Roughriders	W 28–10	8–1	TSN	Mosaic Stadium	28,442	Recap
12	10	Fri, Aug 26	7:30 p.m. PDT	vs. Saskatchewan Roughriders	L 16–23	8–2	TSN/ESPNews	BC Place	23,129	Recap
13	Bye									
14	11	Fri, Sept 9	4:30 p.m. PDT	at Montreal Alouettes	L 10–31	8–3	TSN/RDS	Molson Stadium	15,511	Recap
15	12	Sat, Sept 17	4:00 p.m. PDT	at Calgary Stampeders	W 31–29 (OT)	9–3	TSN	McMahon Stadium	22,319	Recap
16	13	Sat, Sept 24	7:00 p.m. PDT	vs. Calgary Stampeders	L 11–25	9–4	TSN	BC Place	19,323	Recap
17	14	Fri, Sep 30	7:30 p.m. PDT	vs. Ottawa Redblacks	W 34–19	10–4	TSN/ESPN2	BC Place	17,069	Recap
18	15	Sat, Oct 8	1:00 p.m. PDT	at Toronto Argonauts	L 20–23	10–5	TSN	BMO Field	11,089	Recap
19	16	Sat, Oct 15	7:00 p.m. PDT	vs. Winnipeg Blue Bombers	W 40–32	11–5	TSN	BC Place	24,280	Recap
20	17	Fri, Oct 21	6:30 p.m. PDT	at Edmonton Elks	W 31–14	12–5	TSN	Commonwealth Stadium	25,723	Recap
21	18	Fri, Oct 28	5:30 p.m. PDT	at Winnipeg Blue Bombers	L 9–24	12–6	TSN	IG Field	23,685	Recap

# Games played with colour uniforms.
# Games played with white uniforms.
# Games played with alternate uniforms.

== Post-season ==
=== Schedule ===
Game	Date	Kickoff	Opponent	Results		TV	Venue	Attendance	Summary
Game	Date	Kickoff	Opponent	Score	Record	TV	Venue	Attendance	Summary
West Semi-Final	Sun, Nov 6	1:30 p.m. PST	vs. Calgary Stampeders	W 30–16	1–0	TSN/RDS/ESPN2	BC Place	30,114	Recap
West Final	Sun, Nov 13	1:30 p.m. PST	at Winnipeg Blue Bombers	L 20–28	1–1	TSN/RDS/ESPNews	IG Field	30,319	Recap

# Games played with white uniforms.
# Games played with alternate uniforms.

== Roster ==
2022 BC Lions final roster
**Quarterbacks**: 8 Vernon Adams; 17 Antonio Pipkin; 12 Nathan Rourke; **Running backs**: 24 James Butler; 34 David Mackie; 35 Mario Villamizar; **Receivers**: 16 Bryan Burnham; 86 Jevon Cottoy; 84 Keon Hatcher; 13 Alexander Hollins; 88 Daniel Petermann; 19 Dominique Rhymes; 82 Jacob Scarfone; 87 Terry Williams	**Offensive linemen**: 69 Jarell Broxton T; 65 Sukh Chungh G; 61 Joel Figueroa T; 51 Peter Godber C; 54 Andrew Peirson G/C; 59 Kent Perkins T; **Defensive linemen**: 94 Joshua Archibald DE; 92 Josh Banks DT; 58 Woody Baron DT; 90 Mathieu Betts DE; 91 Nathan Cherry DT; 49 Tibo Debaillie DT; 56 David Ménard DE; 47 Sione Teuhema DE	**Linebackers**: 2 Kevin Francis; 44 Isaiah Guzylak-Messam; 46 Ben Hladik; 20 Bo Lokombo; 32 Maxime Rouyer; 21 Jordan Williams; 3 Josh Woods; **Defensive backs**: 29 Jalon Edwards-Cooper; 39 Adrian Greene; 6 T. J. Lee; 1 Garry Peters; 0 Loucheiz Purifoy; 33 Emmanuel Rugamba; 14 Marcus Sayles	**Special teams**: 40 Tanner Doll LS; 41 Stefan Flintoft P; 49 Sean Whyte K; **Practice roster**: 25 Bruce Anderson RB; 26 Tyneil Cooper DB; 42 Jacob Firlotte LB; 36 Quincy Mauger DB; 62 Tyler Packer G; 96 Riley Pickett DE; 57 Tristen Taylor T; 84 Jamarius Way WR	**Injured list**: 23 Delvin Breaux DB; 99 Miles Fox DT; 98 Obum Gwacham DE; 18 Hakeem Johnson DB; 66 David Knevel T/G; 50 Phillip Norman G; 11 Michael O'Connor QB; 89 Josh Pearson WR; 8 Steven Richardson DT; 80 Shai Ross WR; 7 Lucky Whitehead WR; 55 Noah Zerr G; **Suspended**: Kyle Clarot DB; Cam Kitchen DT; Boqiao Li DE; Taquan Mizzell RB; De'Anthony Thomas WR; Michael Warren RB; Tim Williams DE
Italics indicate American player • **Bold** indicates Global player

== Coaching staff ==
BC Lions staff
Front Office and Support Staff: Owner – Amar Doman; President and CEO – Rick LeLacheur; Vice President, Business – George Chayka; Chief Operating Officer – Duane Vienneau; General Managers – Rick Campbell and Neil McEvoy; Director of Football Operations – Neil McEvoy; Assistant General Manager and Director of Player Personnel – Ryan Rigmaiden; Director of Canadian Scouting & CFL Draft Coordinator – Rob Ralph; Video Coordinator – Derek Oswalt; Head Athletic Therapist – Tristan Sandhu; Equipment Manager – Aaron Yeung	Head Coaches: Head Coach – Rick Campbell; Offensive Coaches: Offensive Coordinator & Quarterbacks – Jordan Maksymic; Receivers – Jason Tucker; Offensive Line – Kelly Bates; Offensive Assistant – Trysten Dyce; Defensive Coaches: Defensive Coordinator & Defensive Backs – Ryan Phillips; Defensive Line – John Bowman; Linebackers – Travis Brown; Defensive Assistant – Tanya Walter; Special Teams Coaches: Special Teams Coordinator – Don Yanowsky; → Coaching staff
