= Philip Norman =

Philip or Phillip Norman may refer to:

- Philip Norman (artist) (1842–1931), British artist, author and antiquary
- Philip Norman (author), (born 1943), British dramatist and novelist
- Phillip Norman (musician)
- Phillip Norman (Canadian football)
