= 2017 Texas A&M–Commerce Lions football team =

American college football season

2017 Texas A&M–Commerce Lions football

NCAA Division II champion

NCAA Division II Championship Game, W 37–27 vs. West Florida
- Conference: Lone Star Conference

Ranking
- Coaches: No. 1
- Record: 14–1 (7–1 LSC)
- Head coach: Colby Carthel (5th season)
- Offensive coordinator: Matt Storm (5th season)
- Co-offensive coordinator: Jared May (5th season)
- Offensive scheme: Spread
- Defensive coordinator: Justin Deason (5th season)
- Base defense: 3–4
- Home stadium: Memorial Stadium

2017 Lone Star Conference football standings
	Conf.			Overall
Team	W		L	W		L
No. 11 Midwestern State $^	8	–	0	10	–	1
No. 1 Texas A&M–Commerce ^	7	–	1	14	–	1
Eastern New Mexico	6	–	2	8	–	2
Tarleton State #	4	–	4	6	–	6
Angelo State #	4	–	4	6	–	5
Western New Mexico	3	–	5	4	–	7
Texas A&M–Kingsville	2	–	6	4	–	7
West Texas A&M	1	–	7	3	–	8
UT Permian Basin	1	–	7	2	–	9
$ – Conference champion; ^ – NCAA Division II playoff participant; # – bowl participant (Tarleton State - Heritage Bowl, Angelo State - C.H.A.M.P.S. Heart of Texas Bowl); Rankings from AFCA poll

The 2017 Texas A&M–Commerce Lions football team represented Texas A&M University–Commerce in the 2017 NCAA Division II football season. They were led by head coach Colby Carthel, who was in his fifth season at Texas A&M-Commerce. The Lions played their home games at Memorial Stadium and were members of the Lone Star Conference. The Lions won the NCAA Division II Football Championship. Quarterback Luis Perez also won the Harlon Hill Trophy.

== Preseason ==
=== LSC media poll ===
The LSC media poll was released on August 22, 2017. The Lions were predicted to finish first in the conference.

== Schedule ==
Texas A&M–Commerce announced its 2017 football schedule on December 12, 2016. The schedule consisted of five home and away games in the regular season. The Lions hosted LSC foes Angelo State, Eastern New Mexico, UT Permian Basin, and Western New Mexico and traveled to Midwestern State, Tarleton State, Texas A&M–Kingsville, and West Texas A&M

The Lions hosted one of the two non-conference games against William Jewell from the Great Lakes Valley Conference and traveled to North Alabama from the Gulf South Conference.

Date	Time	Opponent	Rank	Site	TV	Result	Attendance
September 1 (Note: Game was originally scheduled for August 31, but was postponed due to Hurricane Harvey.)	6:00 p.m	at No. 6 North Alabama*	No. 5	Braly Municipal Stadium; Florence, AL		W 8–7	6,892
September 9	6:00 p.m	William Jewell*	No. 3	Memorial Stadium; Commerce, TX		W 59–6	10,108
September 16	6:00 p.m.	Eastern New Mexico	No. 3	Memorial Stadium; Commerce, TX		W 51–22	9,233
September 23	7:00 p.m.	at Texas A&M–Kingsville	No. 3	Javelina Stadium; Kingsville, TX (Chennault Cup)		W 38–7	4,324
October 7	7:00 p.m.	at No. 10 Midwestern State	No. 2	Memorial Stadium; Wichita Falls, TX		L 42–47	9,201
October 14	4:00 p.m.	Western New Mexico^{†}	No. 11	Memorial Stadium; Commerce, TX		W 52–3	8,675
October 21	4:00 p.m.	Angelo State	No. 10	Memorial Stadium; Commerce, TX		W 34–20	6,214
October 28	6:00 p.m.	at West Texas A&M	No. 9	Kimbrough Memorial Stadium; Canyon, TX (East Texas vs. West Texas)		W 35–16	3,896
November 4	4:00 p.m.	UT Permian Basin	No. 9	Memorial Stadium; Commerce, TX		W 52–0	7,132
November 11	2:00 p.m.	at Tarleton State	No. 8	Memorial Stadium; Stephenville, TX (President's Cup)		W 33–21	4,231
November 18	1:00 p.m.	at No. 12 Winona State*	No. 8	Maxwell Field at Warrior Stadium; Winona, MN (NCAA Division II First Round)		W 20–6	1,624
November 25	12:00 p.m.	at No. 7 Central Washington*	No. 8	Tomlinson Stadium; Ellensburg, WA (NCAA Division II Second Round)		W 34–31 ^{2OT}	4,226
December 2	12:00 p.m.	at No. 1 Minnesota State*	No. 8	Blakeslee Stadium; Mankato, MN (NCAA Division II Quarterfinal)		W 31–21	2,803
December 9	2:30 p.m.	Harding*	No. 8	Memorial Stadium; Commerce, TX (NCAA Division II Semifinal)	ESPN3	W 31–17	10,120
December 16	5:00 p.m.	vs. West Florida*	No. 8	Children's Mercy Park; Kansas City, KS (NCAA Division II Football Championship Game)	ESPN2	W 37–27	4,259
*Non-conference game; ^{†}Homecoming; Rankings from AFCA Poll released prior to the game; All times are in Central time

Schedule source:

== Roster ==
2017 Texas A&M–Commerce Football Roster
Quarterbacks: 12 Luis Perez – senior (6'3, 220); 14 Gunnar Palacios – freshman (6'0, 190); 16 Gabriel Rodriguez – senior (5'11, 205); 18 Chase Pemberton – senior (6'4, 190); 19 Preston Wheeler – (redshirt) sophomore (6'3, 200); 29 Jacob Norton – senior (6'6, 225); Running backs: 26 Carandal Hale – (redshirt) freshman (5'11, 190); 32 Richard Whitaker – senior (5'10, 180); 35 Ovie Urevbu – senior (5'11, 210); 38 E.J. Thompson – freshman (5'9, 200); 46 Antonio Lealli'ie'e – (redshirt) freshman (5'11, 210); Wide receivers: 2 Marquis Wimberly – junior (6'2, 205); 3 Darrion Landry – junior (6'3, 200); 4 Buck Wilson – senior (6'0, 185); 5 Shawn Hooks – senior (5'8, 165); 7 D'Arthur Cowan – senior (6'3, 185); 11 Chochy Luce – junior (6'1, 200); 13 Calvin Jones – senior (6'0, 185); 80 Derique Ryan – freshman (6'1, 195); 82 Kareem Adeniyi – (redshirt) freshman (6'5, 215); 83 Kelan Smith – (redshirt) freshman (6'1, 170); 84 Sadavion Matthews – (redshirt) freshman (6'0, 185); 85 Chance Cooper – freshman (6'3, 200); 86 Kenneth Adams – (redshirt) freshman (6'3, 195); 87 D.K. Ward – (redshirt) freshman (6'2, 190); 88 Lorenzo Rosario – junior (6'3, 200); Tight ends: 15 Vincent Hobbs – junior (6'3, 255); 40 Drake Flores – (redshirt) freshman (6'3, 240); 45 Corey Smallwood – (redshirt) freshman (6'3, 215); 81 Austin Jordan – senior (6'5, 225); 96 Justin Barlow – junior (6'7, 245); Long snapper: 63 Addison Medigovich – freshman (6'4, 220)	Offensive linemen: 53 Christian Hernandez – (redshirt) freshman (6'1, 265); 56 Jon Aguilar – senior (6'1, 285); 64 Josh McCullough – junior (6'3, 275); 65 Jonah Brown – (redshirt) sophomore (6'5, 315); 66 Ken Holmes – (redshirt) sophomore (6'4, 275); 68 Jackson Webb – (redshirt) freshman (6'0, 270); 69 Kendall Mathis – (redshirt) freshman (6'3, 300); 70 Abdul Shammaa – (redshirt) sophomore (6'5, 310); 71 Malik Ellis – junior (6'6, 280); 72 Brian Taylor – (redshirt) sophomore (6'2, 275); 73 Ryan Peschka – (redshirt) sophomore (6'2, 290); 74 Jared Machorro – senior (6'7, 280); 75 Lane Hasse – (redshirt) sophomore (6'7, 280); 76 Amon Smion – (redshirt) freshman (6'5, 275); 77 Jordan Smith – junior (6'4, 315); 78 Daronte Shaw – junior (6'5, 320); 79 Poet Thomas – senior (6'6, 325); Defensive linemen: 36 Michael Wallace – junior (6'4, 220); 49 D.D. Fletcher – (redshirt) sophomore (6'1, 270); 51 Josh Reynolds – junior (6'4, 210); 52 Peyton Searcy – junior (6'0, 275); 55 Pierre Leonard – sophomore (5'10, 300); 58 Kieston Carter – senior (5'11, 280); 60 Demondre Lauderdale – sophomore (6'2, 240); 91 Elijah Earls – (redshirt) freshman (6'0, 240); 92 Jaylon Hodge – (redshirt) freshman (6'0, 275); 93 Anthony Ameperosa – senior (6'1, 285); 94 Norman Moimoi – junior (6'2, 280); 95 Kade Satterwhite – sophomore (6'4, 250); 97 Devonta Leary – senior (5'11, 240); 98 Deionte Haywood – junior (6'3, 225); 99 Michael Onuoha – junior (6'5, 255)	Linebackers: 9 Brucks Saathoff – junior (6'0, 215); 28 Mark Westbrook – sophomore (5'11, 195); 31 Jay Bias – (redshirt) freshman (5'9, 190); 33 Neema Behbahani – (redshirt) sophomore (6'1, 230); 37 Anthony Smith – senior (6'2, 200); 39 Tristen Slaughter – junior (6'2, 210); 43 Jaquorous Smith – (redshirt) freshman (5'9, 195); 44 Dayne Douglass – freshman (6'2, 220); 46 Dorian Andrews – freshman (6'2, 200); 48 Travon Blanchard – (redshirt) senior (6'2, 205); 50 Xavier Morris – (redshirt) freshman (6'1, 220); 54 Garret Blubaugh – (redshirt) sophomore (6'2, 230); 57 Brazos Hesskew – (redshirt) freshman (5'11, 200); Defensive backs: 1 Javon Tillman – junior (6'2, 180); 6 Danny Huckaby – junior (6'1, 180); 8 Trey Porter – senior (5'10, 170); 10 Alex Shillow – (redshirt) freshman (5'9, 185); 14 Sammy Gray – junior (5'11, 180); 17 Dominiqe Ramsey – (redshirt) freshman (5'9, 180); 21 Yusef Sterling-Lowe – senior (6'2, 170); 22 Darent White – junior (6'1, 160); 23 Kader Kohou – (redshirt) freshman (5'9, 190); 24 Chris Smith – junior (6'1, 170); 25 Reggie Kincade – junior (5'11, 170); 27 Jalon Edwards-Cooper – (redshirt) sophomore (5'11, 175); 34 Isaiah Fields – (redshirt) freshman (5'8, 170); 41 Rashad Fisher – (redshirt) freshman (5'10, 180); 42 Kendrick Welsh – (redshirt) freshman (5'10, 160); 47 Brent Walker – junior (5'11, 165); Placekickers: 59 Jake Viquez – (redshirt) freshman (5'10, 190); 61 Andrew Gomez – freshman (6'10, 210); 89 Kristov Martinez – junior (5'6, 135); Punters: 37 Tristan Perry – freshman (6'1, 200); 59 Jake Viquez – (redshirt) freshman (5'10, 190)

== Game summaries ==
=== At No. 6 North Alabama ===
No. 5 Texas A&M–Commerce Lions at No. 6 North Alabama Lions

Quarter	1	2	3	4	Total
No. 5 TAMUC Lions	0	0	3	5	8
No. 6 UNA Lions	7	0	0	0	7

at Braly Municipal Stadium, Florence, AL

- Date: September 1
- Game time: 6:00 p.m.
- Game weather: Temperature: 72 °F (22 °C) • Weather: partly sunny • Wind: W 12 MPH
- Game attendance: 6,892
- Referee: Matthew Nicks

Game information

First quarter

- UNA – Dre Hall 20-yard pass from Blake Hawkins (Chandlr Carrera kick), 2:39. UNA 7–0. Drive: 4 plays, 67 yards, 1:06.

Second quarter

- No scoring plays

Third quarter

- TAMUC – Kristov Martinez 30-yard field goal, 7:15. UNA 7–3. Drive: 13 plays, 75 yards, 5:52.

Fourth quarter

- TAMUC – Blake Hawkins tackled by Chris Smith, 4:18. UNA 7–5.
- TAMUC – Kristov Martinez 30-yard field goal, 1:12. TAMUC 8–7. Drive: 6 plays, 23 yards, 2:59.

Top passers

- TAMUC – Luis Perez – 23/37, 179 yards, 3 INT
- UNA – Blake Hawkins – 20/36, 242 yards, TD

Top rushers

- TAMUC – Richard Whitaker – 9 rushes, 38 yards
- UNA – Damon Cox – 15 rushes, 37 yards

Top receivers

- TAMUC – Shawn Hooks – 6 receptions, 43 yards
- UNA – Dre Hall – 6 receptions, 94 yards, TD

The Lions started the 2017 season on the road against the no. 6 North Alabama Lions from the Gulf South Conference. The game was originally scheduled to be played a day earlier, on August 31, but was postponed due to Hurricane Harvey.

The first half was a defensive battle between the two teams, with only two drives not ending in a punt, both by North Alabama. The first drive was in the first quarter when Dre Hall caught a 20-yard pass from Blake Hawkins to put North Alabama up 7–0 following Chandlr Carrera's kick. The second drive occurred in the second quarter when Carrera missed a 37-yard field goal. Commerce would finally get on the board on its first drive of the second half, with Kristov Martinez making a 30-yard field goal. On North Alabama's following possession, Carrera would miss another field goal, this time from 42 yards. Commerce's next three drives would end with Luis Perez throwing an interception. Commerce would score again with 4:18 left when Blake Hawkins was tackled in his own endzone by Chris Smith, resulting in a safety. On the following drive, Martinez would make a 30-yard field goal to give Commerce a 8–7 lead with 1:12 left. North Alabama attempted a 55-yard field goal on the next drive, this time by Joe Gurley, but the kicked was blocked and recovered by Commerce with 12 seconds remaining in the game.

=== William Jewell ===
William Jewell Cardinals at No. 3 Texas A&M–Commerce Lions

Quarter	1	2	3	4	Total
Cardinals	0	0	0	6	6
No. 3 Lions	21	14	17	7	59

at Memorial Stadium, Commerce, TX

- Date: September 9
- Game time: 6:00 p.m.
- Game weather: Temperature: 83 °F (28 °C) • Weather: clear • Wind: ENE 8 MPH
- Game attendance: 10,108
- Referee: Bill Tilley

Game information

First quarter

- TAMUC – Gabriel Rodriguez 13-yard run (Kristov Martinez kick), 12:41. Lions 7–0. Drive: 6 plays, 32 yards, 2:19.
- TAMUC – Darrion Landry 6-yard pass from Luis Perez (Kristov Martinez kick), 8:01. Lions 14–0. Drive: 3 plays, 13 yards, 1:07.
- TAMUC – Garrett Blubaugh 11-yard interception return (Kristov Martinez kick), 3:35. Lions 21–0.

Second quarter

- TAMUC – Buck Wilson 16-yard pass from Luis Perez (Kristov Martinez kick), 11:05. Lions 28–0. Drive: 11 plays, 72 yards, 4:28.
- TAMUC – Shawn Hooks 39-yard pass from Luis Perez (Kristov Martinez kick), 2:24. Lions 35–0. Drive: 7 plays, 72 yards, 2:40.

Third quarter

- TAMUC – Kristov Martinez 19-yard field goal, 11:38. Lions 38–0. Drive: 7 plays, 59 yards, 2:03.
- TAMUC – Buck Wilson 18-yard pass from Luis Perez (Kristov Martinez kick), 7:32. Lions 45–0. Drive: 2 plays, 40 yards, 0:36.
- TAMUC – Carandal Hale 7-yard run (Kristov Martinez kick), 5:38. Lions 52–0. Drive: 2 plays, 19 yards, 0:34.

Fourth quarter

- TAMUC – E.J. Thompson 17-yard run (Kristov Martinez kick), 13:01. Lions 59–0. Drive: 5 plays, 66 yards, 2:28.
- WJC – Nick Fisher 8-yard pass from Bard Strauss, 0:00. Lions 59–6. Drive: 8 plays, 53 yards, 1:35.

Top passers

- WJC – Brad Strauss – 28/44, 206 yards, TD, 3 INT
- TAMUC – Luis Perez – 20/29, 236 yards, 4 TD

Top rushers

- WJC – Brad Strauss – 9 rushes, 20 yards
- TAMUC – E.J. Thompson – 7 rushes, 69 yards, TD

Top receivers

- WJC – Bulla Graft – 5 receptions, 40 yards
- TAMUC – Vincent Hobbs – 6 receptions, 81 yards

=== Eastern New Mexico ===
Eastern New Mexico Greyhounds at No. 3 Texas A&M–Commerce Lions

Quarter	1	2	3	4	Total
Greyhounds	3	12	7	0	22
No. 3 Lions	13	28	7	3	51

at Memorial Stadium, Commerce, TX

- Date: September 16
- Game time: 6:00 p.m.
- Game weather: Temperature: 89 °F (32 °C) • Weather: clear • Wind: SSE 9 MPH
- Game attendance: 9,233
- Referee: Joe Horn

Game information

First quarter

- TAMUC – Carandal Hale 3-yard run (Kristov Martinez kick), 12:06. Lions 7–0. Drive: 7 plays, 75 yards, 2:54.
- ENMU – Bailey Hale 48-yard field goal, 5:15. Lions 7–3. Drive: 12 plays, 36 yards, 6:38.
- TAMUC – Vincnet Hobbs 56-yard pass from Luis Perez (kick blocked), 3:45. Lions 13–3. Drive: 4 plays, 75 yards, 1:30.

Second quarter

- ENMU – D'Maujeric Tucker 11-yard run (kick blocked), 14:22. Lions 13–9. Drive: 10 plays, 72 yards, 4:23.
- TAMUC – Darrion Landry 64-yard pass from Luis Perez (Kristov Martinez kick), 13:53. Lions 20–9. Drive: 1 play, 59 yards, 0:22.
- TAMUC – D'Arthur Cowan 54-yard pass from Luis Perez (Kristov Martinez kick), 11:18. Lions 27–9. Drive: 1 play, 54 yards, 0:20.
- TAMUC – Buck Wilson 15-yard pass from Luis Perez (Kristov Martinez kick), 6:16. Lions 34–9. Drive: 8 plays, 54 yards, 3:24.
- ENMU – Dakota Montoya 4-yard interception return (pass failed), 0:50. Lions 34–15.
- TAMUC – Darrion Landry 23-yard pass from Luis Perez (Kristov Martinez kick), 0:19. Lions 41–15. Drive: 2 plays, 23 yards, 0:19.

Third quarter

- ENMU – Wyatt Strand 2-yard run (Bailey Hale kick), 8:15. Lions 41–22. Drive: 14 plays, 75 yards, 6:45.
- TAMUC – Luis Perez 6-yard run (Kristov Martinez kick), 5:14. Lions 48–22. Drive: 8 plays, 39 yards, 2:59.

Fourth quarter

- TAMUC – Kristov Martinez 25-yard field goal, 7:07. Lions 51–22. Drive: 11 plays, 75 yards, 5:56.

Top passers

- ENMU – Wyatt Strand – 7/10, 68 yards
- TAMUC – Luis Perez – 20/24, 357 yards, 5 TD, INT

Top rushers

- ENMU – Kamal Cass – 25 rushes, 118 yards
- TAMUC – Carandal Hale – 8 rushes, 62 yards, TD

Top receivers

- ENMU – Clayton Smith – 4 receptions, 52 yards
- TAMUC – Darrion Landry – 7 receptions, 112 yards, 2 TD

=== At Texas A&M–Kingsville ===
No. 3 Texas A&M–Commerce Lions at Texas A&M–Javelinas

Quarter	1	2	3	4	Total
No. 3 Lions	14	7	10	7	38
Javelinas	0	0	7	0	7

at Javelina Stadium, Kingsville, TX

- Date: September 23
- Game time: 7:00 p.m.
- Game weather: Temperature: 89 °F (32 °C) • Weather: clear and sunny • Wind: E 18 MPH
- Game attendance: 4,324
- Referee: Bryant Thompson

Game information

First quarter

- TAMUC – Darrion Landry 55-yard pass from Luis Perez (Kristov Martinez kick), 13:04. Lions 7–0. Drive: 2 plays, 62 yards, 0:35.
- TAMUC – D'Arthur Cowan 6-yard pass from Luis Perez (Kristov Martinez kick), 8:26. Lions 14–0. Drive: 6 plays, 30 yards, 2:38.

Second quarter

- TAMUC – Gabriel Rodriguez 2-yard run (Kristov Martinez kick), 14:00. Lions 21–0. Drive: 6 plays, 39 yards, 2:53.

Third quarter

- TAMUK – Nico Brown 4-yard pass from Cade Dyal (J. De la Garza kick), 10:01. Lions 21–7. Drive: 8 plays, 33 yards, 3:26.
- TAMUC – D'Arthur Cowan 51-yard pass from Luis Perez (Kristov Martinez kick), 8:44. Lions 28–7. Drive: 3 plays, 75 yards, 1:17.
- TAMUC – Kristov Martinez 44-yard field goal, 0:20. Lions 31–7. Drive: 9 plays, 17 yards, 3:23.

Fourth quarter

- TAMUC – Shawn Hooks 20-yard pass from Luis Perez (Kristov Martinez kick), 14:09. Lions 38–7. Drive: 2 plays, 20 yards, 0:09.

Top passers

- TAMUC – Luis Perez – 24/32, 319 yards, 4 TD
- TAMUK – Cade Dyal – 17/30, 118 yards, TD, 3 INT

Top rushers

- TAMUC – E.J. Thompson – 8 rushes, 21 yards
- TAMUK – Marcus Younger – 11 rushes, 23 yards

Top receivers

- TAMUC – Darrion Landry – 4 receptions, 98 yards, TD
- TAMUK – Jordan Thomas – 8 receptions, 72 yards

=== At No. 10 Midwestern State ===
No. 2 Texas A&M–Commerce Lions at No. 10 Midwestern State Mustangs

Quarter	1	2	3	4	Total
No. 2 Lions	0	14	7	21	42
No. 10 Mustangs	6	21	20	0	47

at Memorial Stadium, Wichita Falls, TX

- Date: October 7
- Game time: 7:00 p.m.
- Game weather: Temperature: 78 °F (26 °C) • Weather: clear • Wind: ESE 2 MPH
- Game attendance: 9,201
- Referee: John Belcher

Game information

First quarter

- MSU – Xavier Land 22-yard pass from Layton Rabb (kick blocked), 1:13. Mustangs 6–0. Drive: 6 plays, 78 yards, 2:14.

Second quarter

- MSU – Tyrique Edwards 23-yard pass from Layton Rabb (Mitchell Henton kick), 11:17. Mustangs 13–0. Drive: 10 plays, 76 yards, 3:34.
- MSU – Vincent Johnson 3-yard run (Mitchell Henton kick), 6:50. Mustangs 20–0. Drive: 6 plays, 44 yards, 2:47.
- TAMUC – E.J. Thompson 1-yard run (Kristov Martinez kick), 3:01. Mustangs 20–7. Drive: 7 plays, 45 yards, 3:41.
- MSU – Vincent Johnson 65-yard run (Mitchell Henton kick), 1:54. Mustangs 27–7. Drive: 3 plays, 74 yards, 0:54.
- TAMUC – Buck Wilson 20-yard pass from Luis Perez (Kristov Martinez kick), 0:30. Mustangs 27–14. Drive: 7 plays, 77 yards, 1:17.

Third quarter

- MSU – Marcus Wilkerson 54-yard fumble return (Mitchell Henton kick), 10:23. Mustangs 34–14.
- MSU – Vincent Johnson 4-yard run (kick failed), 4:26. Mustangs 40–14. Drive: 10 plays, 81 yards, 3:48.
- TAMUC – Buck Wilson 26-yard pass from Luis Perez (Kristov Martinez kick), 2:18. Mustangs 40–21. Drive: 6 plays, 63 yards, 2:01.
- MSU – DeAndre Black 56-yard pass from Layton Rabb (Mitchell Henton kick), 1:46. Mustangs 47–21. Drive: 2 plays, 75 yards, 0:25.

Fourth quarter

- TAMUC – Marquis Wimberly 10-yard pass from Luis Perez (Kristov Martinez kick), 13:46. Mustangs 47–28. Drive: 8 plays, 70 yards, 2:51.
- TAMUC – D'Arthur Cowan 3-yard pass from Luis Perez (Vincent Hobbs pass), 7:41. Mustangs 47–36. Drive: 5 plays, 25 yards, 2:08.
- TAMUC – Carandal Hale 15-yard run (pass failed), 4:33. Mustangs 47–42. Drive: 4 plays, 72 yards, 1:19.

Top passers

- TAMUC – Luis Perez – 43/55, 437 yards, 4 TD, 2 INT
- MSU – Layton Rabb – 16/28, 265 yards, 3 TD

Top rushers

- TAMUC – Carandal Hale – 9 rushes, 62 yards, TD
- MSU – Vincent Johnson – 19 rushes, 133 yards, 3 TD

Top receivers

- TAMUC – Vincent Hobbs – 7 receptions, 105 yards
- MSU – Tyrique Edwards – 7 receptions, 94 yards, TD

=== Western New Mexico ===
Western New Mexico Mustangs at No. 11 Texas A&M–Commerce Lions

Quarter	1	2	3	4	Total
Mustangs	0	3	0	0	3
No. 11 Lions	17	0	21	14	52

at Memorial Stadium, Commerce, TX

- Date: October 14
- Game time: 4:00 p.m.
- Game weather: Temperature: 90 °F (32 °C) • Weather: clear • Wind: S 12 MPH
- Game attendance: 8,675
- Referee: Wayne Elliott

Game information

First quarter

- TAMUC – Kristov Martinez 27-yard field goal, 10:58. Lions 3–0. Drive: 9 plays, 37 yards, 4:02.
- TAMUC – Buck Wilson 48-yard pass from Luis Perez (Kristov Martinez kick), 7:35. Lions 10–0. Drive:3 plays, 62 yards, 0:41.
- TAMUC – Shawn Hooks 16-yard pass from Luis Perez (Kristov Martinez kick), 4:47. Lions 17–0. Drive: 2 plays, 16 yards, 0:44.

Second quarter

- WNMU – Collin Grady 39-yard field goal, 0:01. Lions 17–3. Drive: 11 plays, 30 yards, 3:13.

Third quarter

- TAMUC – Gabriel Rodriguez 1-yard run (Kristov Martinez kick), 12:14. Lions 24–3. Drive: 6 plays, 44 yards, 1:20.
- TAMUC – D'Arthur Cowan 41-yard pass from Luis Perez (Kristov Martinez kick), 2:56. Lions 31–3. Drive: 2 plays, 45 yards, 0:31.
- TAMUC – Darrion Landry 24-yard pass from Luis Perez (Kristov Martinez kick), 1:06. Lions 38–3. Drive: 3 plays, 13 yards, 1:43.

Fourth quarter

- TAMUC – Buck Wilson 28-yard pass from Luis Perez (Kristov Martinez kick), 12:38. Lions 45–3. Drive: 4 plays, 55 yards, 0:45.
- TAMUC – Jay Bias 5-yard blocked punt return, 6:33. Lions 52–3.

Top passers

- WNMU – Matt Hommel – 17/35, 124 yards, 2 INT
- TAMUC – Luis Perez – 23/32, 358 yards, 5 TD

Top rushers

- WNMU – Justin Harris – 16 rushes, 75 yards
- TAMUC – Darrius Webb – 7 rushes, 54 yards

Top receivers

- WNMU – D'Angelo Bowie – 3 receptions, 36 yards
- TAMUC – D'Arthur Cowan – 4 receptions, 87 yards, TD

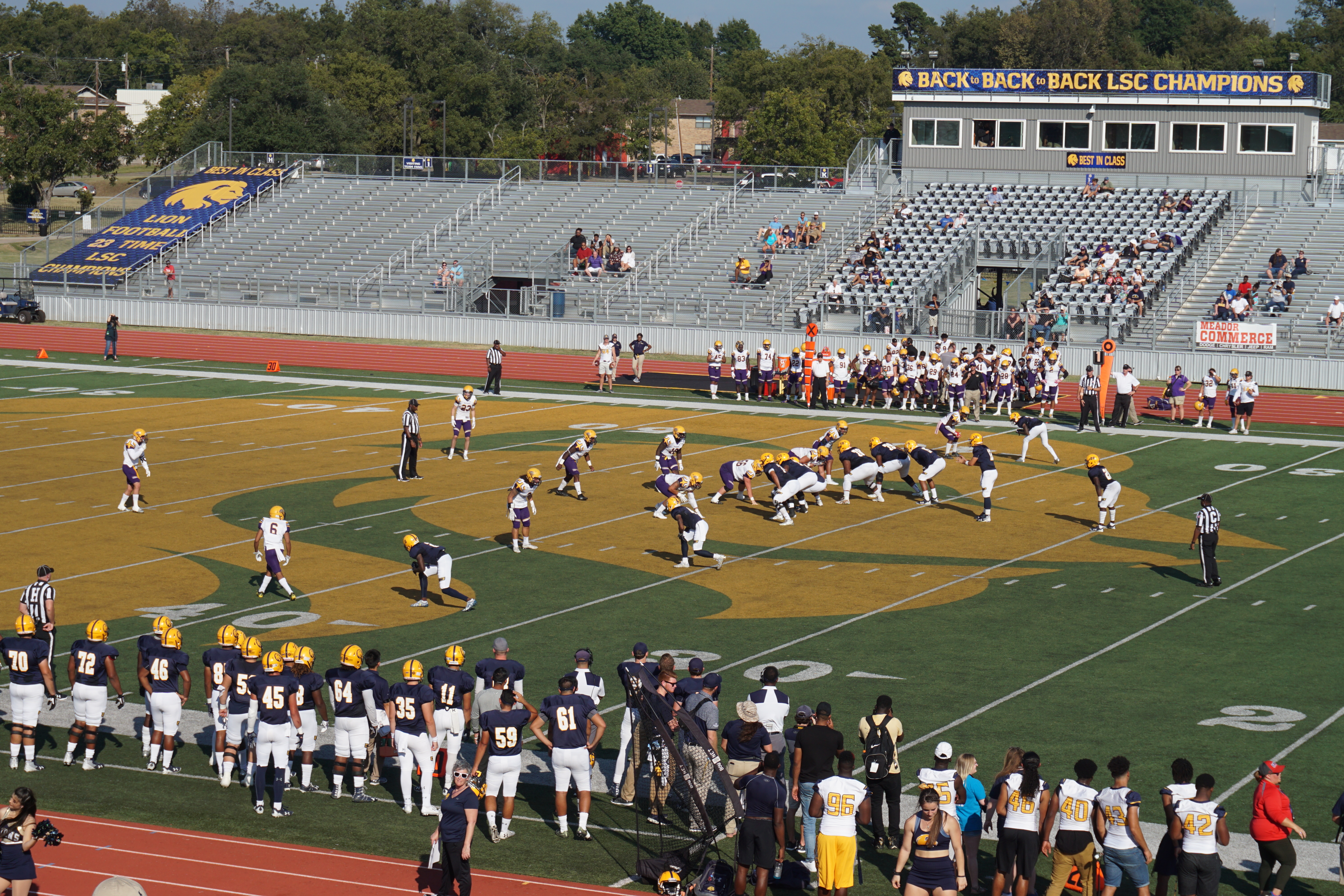
A&M–Commerce in action against the Western New Mexico Mustangs

=== Angelo State ===
Angelo State Rams at No. 10 Texas A&M–Commerce Lions

Quarter	1	2	3	4	Total
Rams	3	7	7	3	20
No. 10 Lions	7	10	7	10	34

at Memorial Stadium, Commerce, TX

- Date: October 21
- Game time: 4:00 p.m.
- Game weather: Temperature: 80 °F (27 °C) • Weather: cloudy • Wind: S 15 MPH
- Game attendance: 6,214
- Referee: Dan Rankin

Game information

First quarter

- ASU – Connor Flanigan 45-yard field goal, 4:20. Rams 3–0. Drive: 12 plays, 53 yards, 4:05.
- TAMUC – Darrion Landry 49-yard pass from Luis Perez (Kristov Martinez kick), 2:51. Lions 7–3. Drive: 5 plays, 75 yards, 1:29.

Second quarter

- TAMUC – Kristov Martinez 23-yard field goal, 11:28. Lions 10–3. Drive: 8 plays, 34 yards, 2:37.
- TAMUC – Marquis Wimberly 11-yard pass from Luis Perez (Kristov Martinez kick), 4:11. Lions 17–3. Drive: 2 plays, 11 yards, 0:47.
- ASU – Wesley Lewis 23-yard pass from Charlie Rotherham (Connor Flanigan kick), 1:44. Lions 17–10. Drive: 11 plays, 75 yards, 2:27.

Third quarter

- TAMUC – Marquis Wimberly 7-yard pass from Luis Perez (Kristov Martinez kick), 6:41. Lions 24–10. Drive: 6 plays, 74 yards, 3:15.
- ASU – Charlie Rotherham 3-yard run (Connor Flanigan kick), 0:48. Lions 24–17. Drive: 9 plays, 71 yards, 2:33.

Fourth quarter

- TAMUC – Kristov Martinez 26-yard field goal, 11:00. Lions 27–17. Drive: 12 plays, 57 yards, 4:43.
- ASU – Connor Flanigan 21-yard field goal, 8:14. Lions 27–20. Drive: 12 plays, 46 yards, 2:44.
- TAMUC – Darrion Landry 33-yard pass from Luis Perez (Kristov Martinez kick), 1:29. Lions 34–20. Drive: 9 plays, 53 yards, 3:40.

Top passers

- ASU – Charlie Rotherham – 27/50, 294 yards, TD, INT
- TAMUC – Luis Perez – 34/46, 373 yards, 4 TD

Top rushers

- ASU – Josh Stevens – 20 rushes, 58 yards
- TAMUC – Carandal Hale – 21 rushes, 104 yards

Top receivers

- ASU – Donovan Thompson – 13 receptions, 170 yards
- TAMUC – Marquis Wimberly – 8 receptions, 113 yards, 2 TD

=== At West Texas A&M ===
No. 9 Texas A&M–Commerce Lions at West Texas A&M Buffaloes

Quarter	1	2	3	4	Total
No. 9 Lions	21	7	7	0	35
Buffaloes	10	3	0	3	16

at Kimbrough Memorial Stadium, Canyon, TX

- Date: October 28
- Game time: 6:00 p.m.
- Game attendance: 3,896
- Referee: Joe Horn

Game information

First quarter

- TAMUC – D'Arthur Cowan 10-yard pass from Luis Perez (Kristov Martinez kick), 13:19. Lions 7–0. Drive: 4 plays, 83 yards, 1:41.
- WT – Junior Pome'e 7-yard pass from Justin Houghtaling (Alex Schrag kick), 9:37. Tied 7–7. Drive: 3 plays, 15 yards, 1:23.
- TAMUC – Darrion Landry 6-yard pass from Luis Perez (Kristov Martinez kick), 6:11. Lions 14–7. Drive: 8 plays, 82 yards, 3:20.
- WT – Alex Schrag 45-yard field goal, 0:40. Lions 14–10. Drive: 11 plays, 47 yards, 5:31.
- TAMUC – Buck Wilson 100-yard kick return (Kristov Martinez kick), 0:25. Lions 21–10.

Second quarter

- WT – Alex Schrag 39-yard field goal, 5:30. Lions 21–13. Drive: 7 plays, 41 yards, 3:54.
- TAMUC – D'Arthur Cowan 14-yard pass from Luis Perez (Kristov Martinez kick), 1:11. Lions 28–13. Drive: 9 plays, 75 yards, 4:19.

Third quarter

- TAMUC – Vincent Hobbs 8-yard run, 7:40. Lions 35–13. Drive: 8 plays, 65 yards, 2:39.

Fourth quarter

- WT – Alex Schrag 38-yard field goal, 14:02. Lions 35–16. Drive: 11 plays, 44 yards, 5:27.

Top passers

- TAMUC – Luis Perez – 30/46, 387 yards, 3 TD
- WT – Justin Houghtaling – 10/20, 158 yards, TD, INT

Top rushers

- TAMUC – Carandal Hale – 11 rushes, 44 yards
- WT – Warren Witherspoon – 31 rushes, 87 yards

Top receivers

- TAMUC – Darrion Landry – 6 receptions, 121 yards, TD
- WT – Avery Lewis – 2 receptions, 72 yards

=== UT Permian Basin ===
UT Permian Basin Falcons at No. 9 Texas A&M–Commerce Lions

Quarter	1	2	3	4	Total
Falcons	0	0	0	0	0
No. 9 Lions	21	14	14	3	52

at Memorial Stadium, Commerce, TX

- Date: November 4
- Game time: 4:00 p.m.
- Game weather: Temperature: 83 °F (28 °C) • Weather: mostly cloudy • Wind: SSW 14 MPH
- Game attendance: 7,132
- Referee: Brad Frisby

Game information

First quarter

- TAMUC – Gabriel Rodriguez 1-yard run (Kristov Martinez kick), 10:11. Lions 7–0. Drive: 10 plays, 75 yards, 4:49.
- TAMUC – Austin Jordan 1-yard pass from Luis Perez (Kristov Martinez kick), 7:37. Lions 14–0. Drive: 4 plays, 40 yards, 1:27.
- TAMUC – Vincent Hobbs 74-yard pass from Luis Perez (Kristov Martinez kick), 6:29. Lions 21–0. Drive: 1 play, 74 yards, 0:12.

Second quarter

- TAMUC – Buck Wilson 18-yard pass from Luis Perez (Kristov Martinez kick), 7:04. Lions 28–0. Drive: 9 plays, 91 yards, 3:24.
- TAMUC – Vincent Hobbs 30-yard pass from Luis Perez (Kristov Martinez kick), 1:25. Lions 35–0. Drive: 3 plays, 44 yards, 0:20.

Third quarter

- TAMUC – D'Arthur Cowan 2-yard pass from Luis Perez (Kristov Martinez kick), 6:49. Lions 42–0. Drive: 9 plays, 87 yards, 4:32.
- TAMUC – Richard Whitaker 14-yard run (Kristov Martinez kick), 3:18. Lions 49–0. Drive: 5 plays, 54 yards, 1:30.

Fourth quarter

- TAMUC – Kristov Martinez 28-yard field goal, 9:10. Lions 52–0. Drive: 4 plays, -2 yards, 1:14.

Top passers

- UTPB – Kameron Mathis – 7/22, 54 yards
- TAMUC – Luis Perez – 26/34, 301 yards, 4 TD

Top rushers

- UTPB – Jordan Williams – 5 rushes, 28 yards
- TAMUC – Carandal Hale – 6 rushes, 84 yards

Top receivers

- UTPB – Jake Anglin – 3 receptions, 33 yards
- TAMUC – Vincent Hobbs – 6 receptions, 144 yards, 2 TD

=== At Tarleton State ===
No. 8 Texas A&M–Commerce Lions at Tarleton State Texans

Quarter	1	2	3	4	Total
No. 8 Lions	17	6	0	10	33
Texans	0	0	7	14	21

at Memorial Stadium, Stephenville, TX

- Date: November 11
- Game time: 2:00 p.m.
- Game weather: Temperature: 64 °F (18 °C) • Weather: cloudy • Wind: S 13 MPH
- Game attendance: 4,231
- Referee: John Belcher

Game information

First quarter

- TAMUC – Buck Wilson 61-yard pass from Luis Perez (Kristov Martinez kick), 13:14. Lions 7–0. Drive: 3 plays, 66 yards, 0:43.
- TAMUC – Darrion Landry 6-yard pass from Luis Perez (Kristov Martinez kick), 8:58. Lions 14–0. Drive: 6 plays, 49 yards, 2:03.
- TAMUC – Kristov Martinez 24-yard field goal, 1:33. Lions 17–0. Drive: 8 plays, 45 yards, 2:57.

Second quarter

- TAMUC – Kristov Martinez 39-yard field goal, 11:15. Lions 20–0. Drive: 10 plays, 45 yards, 4:17.
- TAMUC – Kristov Martinez 42-yard field goal, 5:58. Lions 23–0. Drive: 5 plays, 25 yards, 1:57.

Third quarter

- TSU – Adam Berryman 69-yard run (Sergio Sroka kick), 11:49. Lions 23–7. Drive: 2 plays, 71 yards, 0:50.

Fourth quarter

- TAMUC – Kristov Martinez 35-yard field goal, 12:07. Lions 26–7. Drive: 9 plays, 65 yards, 2:55.
- TSU – Jeff Thomas 25-yard pass from Zed Woerner (Sergio Sroka kick), 10:08. Lions 26–14. Drive: 5 plays, 75 yards, 1:59.
- TSU – Adam Berryman 54-yard pass from Zed Woerner (Sergio Sroka kick), 4:41. Lions 26–21. Drive: 11 plays, 90 yards, 4:27.
- TAMUC – Marquis Wimberly 32-yard pass from Luis Perez (Kristov Martinez kick), 1:23. Lions 33–21. Drive: 8 plays, 72 yards, 3:11.

Top passers

- TAMUC – Luis Perez – 34/50, 482 yards, 3 TD
- TSU – Zed Woerner – 13/26, 149 yards, 2 TD, 2 INT

Top rushers

- TAMUC – Carandal Hale – 23 rushes, 78 yards
- TSU – Adam Berryman – 15 rushes, 105 yards, TD

Top receivers

- TAMUC – Buck Wilson – 7 receptions, 193 yards, TD
- TSU – Jeff Thomas – 4 receptions, 54 yards, TD

=== At No. 12 Winona State (Regional Quarterfinal) ===
No. 8 Texas A&M–Commerce Lions at No. 12 Winona State Warriors (Regional Quarterfinal)

Quarter	1	2	3	4	Total
No. 8 Lions	14	0	3	3	20
No. 12 Warriors	0	3	3	0	6

at Maxwell Field at Warrior Stadium, Winoa, MN

- Date: November 18
- Game time: 1:00 p.m.
- Game weather: Temperature: 40 °F (4 °C) • Weather: mostly sunny • Wind: NW 11 MPH
- Game attendance: 1,624
- Referee: Mike Packard

Game information

First quarter

- TAMUC – Vincent Hobbs 9-yard pass from Luis Perez (Kristov Martinez kick), 7:20. Lions 7–0. Drive: 6 plays, 60 yards, 2:30.
- TAMUC – Vincent Hobbs 4-yard pass Luis Perez (Kristov Martinez kick), 2:26. Lions 14–0. Drive: 9 plays, 61 yards, 3:58.

Second quarter

- WSU – Carter McCauley 27-yard field goal, 6:45. Lions 14–3. Drive: 8 plays, 57 yards, 4:06.

Third quarter

- TAMUC – Kristov Martinez 46-yard field goal, 11:47. Lions 17–3. Drive: 9 plays, 34 yards, 3:06.
- WSU – Carter McCauley 26-yard field goal, 0:38. Lions 17–6. Drive: 8 plays, 40 yards, 4:08.

Fourth quarter

- TAMUC – Kristov Martinez 22-yard field goal, 7:25. Lions 20–6. Drive: 9 plays, 85 yards, 4:52.

Top passers

- TAMUC – Luis Perez – 28/41, 308 yards, 2 TD
- WSU – Darren Beenken – 13/35, 167 yards, 3 INT

Top rushers

- TAMUC – Carandal Hale – 23 rushes, 106 yards
- WSU – Eric Birth – 9 rushes, 60 yards

Top receivers

- TAMUC – Buck Wilson – 4 receptions, 95 yards
- WSU – Isaiah Frandsen – 4 receptions, 71 yards

=== At No. 7 Central Washington (Regional semifinal) ===
No. 8 Texas A&M–Commerce Lions at No. 7 Central Washington Wildcats (Regional semifinal)

Quarter	1	2	3	4	OT	2OT	Total
No. 8 Lions	7	0	7	14	3	3	34
No. 7 Wildcats	14	14	0	0	3	0	31

at Tomlinson Stadium, Ellensburg, WA

- Date: November 25
- Game time: 12:00 p.m.
- Game weather: Temperature: 35 °F (2 °C) • Weather: cloudy and damp • Wind: Calm
- Game attendance: 4,226
- Referee: Brett Ford

Game information

First quarter

- CWU – Reilly Hennessey 10-yard run (Gav Todd kick), 12:51. Wildcats 7–0. Drive: 6 plays, 75 yards, 2:09.
- CWU – Christian Stafford Reilly Hennessey (Gav Todd kick), 1:37. Wildcats 14–0. Drive: 16 plays, 88 yards, 7:47.
- TAMUC – Buck Wilson 52-yard pass from Luis Perez (Kristov Martinez kick), 1:18. Wildcats 14–7. Drive: 1 play, 52 yards, 0:19.

Second quarter

- CWU – Kyle Self 3-yard pass from Reilly Hennessey (Gav Todd kick), 10:03. Wildcats 21–7. Drive: 7 plays, 56 yards, 2:19.
- CWU – Austin Pernell 1-yard run (Gav Todd kick), 6:04. Wildcats 28–7. Drive: 8 plays, 64 yards, 3:04.

Third quarter

- TAMUC – Carandal Hale 26-yard run (Kristov Martinez kick), 13:41. Wildcats 28–14. Drive: 5 plays, 58 yards, 1:19.

Fourth quarter

- TAMUC – Vincent Hobbs 9-yard pass from Luis Perez (Kristov Martinez kick), 12:00. Wildcats 28–21. Drive: 11 plays, 67 yards, 4:19.
- TAMUC – Buck Wilson 4-yard pass from Luis Perez (Kristov Martinez kick), 0:03. Tied 28–28. Drive: 14 plays, 64 yards, 2:34.

Overtime

- TAMUC – Kristov Martinez 38-yard field goal. Lions 31–28. Drive: 4 plays, 4 yards.
- CWU – Gav Todd 22-yard field goal. Tied 31–31. Drive: 7 plays, 20 yards.

Second overtime

- TAMUC – Kristov Martinez 38-yard field goal. Lions 34–31. Drive: 4 plays, 4 yards.

Top passers

- TAMUC – Luis Perez – 41/65, 394 yards, 3 TD, 4 INT
- CWU – Reilly Hennessey – 22/34, 265 yards, 2 TD, INT

Top rushers

- TAMUC – Carandal Hale – 12 rushes, 58 yards, TD
- CWU – Austin Pernell – 31 rushes, 158 yards, TD

Top receivers

- TAMUC – Buck Wilson – 12 receptions, 141 yards, 2 TD
- CWU – Christian Gasca – 4 receptions, 58 yards

The Lions traveled to Ellensburg, Washington to face the no. 7 Wildcats in the regional semifinal of the Division II playoffs. Texas A&M–Commerce trailed Eastern Washington 28–7 at halftime, but scored 21 unanswered points in the second half to tie the game. The two teams traded field goals in the first overtime period, with the Lions' Kristov Martinez making a 38-yard field goal in the second overtime period to win the game and advance to the Regional Final.

=== At No. 1 Minnesota State (Regional Final) ===
No. 8 Texas A&M–Commerce Lions at No. 1 Minnesota State Mavericks (Regional Final)

Quarter	1	2	3	4	Total
No. 8 Lions	10	3	8	10	31
No. 1 Mavericks	7	11	0	3	21

at Blakeslee Stadium, Mankato, MN

- Date: December 2
- Game time: 12:00 p.m.
- Game weather: Temperature: 43 °F (6 °C) • Weather: sunny • Wind: SW 5 MPH
- Game attendance: 2,803
- Referee: Dwight Neibling

Game information

First quarter

- MSU – Ty Dennis 36-yard pass from Ryan Schlichte (Casey Bednarski kick), 12:29. Mavericks 7–0. Drive: 7 plays, 75 yards, 2:31.
- TAMUC – E.J. Thompson 19-yard run (Kristov Martinez kick), 5:56. Tied 7–7. Drive: 6 plays, 76 yards, 2:33.
- TAMUC – Kristov Martinez 37-yard field goal, 1:56. Lions 10–7. Drive: 9 plays, 39 yards, 2:54.

Second quarter

- MSU – Casey Bednarski 25-yard field goal, 11:50. Tied 10–10. Drive: 13 plays, 57 yards, 5:06.
- TAMUC – Kristov Martinez 35-yard field goal, 1:45. Lions 13–10. Drive: 8 plays, 41 yards, 2:43.
- MSU – Ty Dennis 24-yard pass from Ryan Schlicte (Nate Gunn run), 0:25. Mavericks 18–13. Drive: 3 plays, 27 yards, 0:37.

Third quarter

- TAMUC – Buck Wilson 80-yard punt return (Carandal Hale run), 10:30. Lions 21–18.

Fourth quarter

- MSU – Casey Bednarski 40-yard field goal, 13:09. Tied 21–21. Drive: 10 plays, 57 yards, 3:25.
- TAMUC – Kristov Martinez 48-yard field goal, 11:29. Lions 24–21. Drive: 4 plays, 8 yards, 1:28.
- TAMUC – Marquis Wimberly 30-yard pass from Luis Perez (Kristov Martinez kick), 6:47. Lions 31–21. Drive: 7 plays, 67 yards, 3:27.

Top passers

- TAMUC – Luis Perez – 28/41, 257 yards, TD
- MSU – Ryan Schlichte – 10/30, 198 yards, 2 TD, INT

Top rushers

- TAMUC – E.J. Thompson – 14 rushes, 70 yards, TD
- MSU – Nate Gunn – 31 rushes, 139 yards

Top receivers

- TAMUC – Marquis Wimberly – 5 receptions, 79 yards, TD
- MSU – Shane Zylstra – 4 receptions, 74 yards

=== Harding (National semifinal) ===
Harding Bisons at No. 8 Texas A&M–Commerce Lions (National semifinal)

Quarter	1	2	3	4	Total
Bisons	7	0	0	10	17
No. 8 Lions	7	7	3	14	31

at Memorial Stadium, Commerce, TX

- Date: December 9
- Game time: 2:30 p.m.
- Game attendance: 10,120
- Referee: Brett Ford
- TV: ESPN3

Game information

First quarter

- HU – Grant Kimberlin 51-yard run (Tristan Parsley kick), 13:29. Bisons 7–0. Drive: 3 plays, 75 yards, 1:31.
- TAMUC – Gabriel Rodriguez 2-yard run (Kristov Martinez kick), 10:42. Tied 7–7. Drive: 7 plays, 63 yards, 2:41.

Second quarter

- TAMUC – Vincent Hobbs 3-yard pass from Luis Perez (Kristov Martinez kick), 5:28. Lions 14–7. Drive: 13 plays, 99 yards, 4:19.

Third quarter

- TAMUC – Kristov Martinez 32-yard field goal, 12:29. Lions 17–7. Drive: 7 plays, 60 yards, 2:31.

Fourth quarter

- HU – Cole Chancey 1-yard run (Tristan Parsley kick), 14:38. Lions 17–14. Drive: 9 plays, 51 yards, 3:39.
- TAMUC – Carandal Hale 11-yard run (Kristov Martinez kick), 8:54. Lions 24–14. Drive: 12 plays, 88 yards, 5:39.
- HU – Tristan Parsley 30-yard field goal, 4:13. Lions 24–17. Drive: 9 plays, 62 yards, 4:40.
- TAMUC – D'Arthur Cowan 90-yard pass from Luis Perez (Kristov Martinez kick), 3:50. Lions 31–17. Drive: 1 play, 90 yards, 0:16.

Top passers

- HU – Preston Paden – 3/10, 60 yards, INT
- TAMUC – Luis Perez – 24/34, 288 yards, 2 TD

Top rushers

- HU – Cole Chancey – 27 rushes, 108 yards, TD
- TAMUC – E.J. Thompson – 13 rushes, 75 yards

Top receivers

- HU – Grant Kimberlin – 3 receptions, 60 yards
- TAMUC – D'Arthur Cowan – 5 receptions, 101 yards, TD

=== Vs. West Florida (NCAA Division II National Championship game) ===
West Florida Argonauts vs. No. 8 Texas A&M–Commerce Lions (Division II Championship)

Quarter	1	2	3	4	Total
Argonauts	7	7	6	7	27
No. 8 Lions	14	6	14	3	37

at Children's Mercy Park, Kansas City, KS

- Date: December 16
- Game time: 5:00 p.m.
- Game weather: Temperature: 61 °F (16 °C) • Weather: clear • Wind: S/SE 7 MPH
- Game attendance: 4,259
- Referee: Dwight Neibling
- TV: ESPN2

Game information

First quarter

- TAMUC – Shawn Hooks 50-yard pass from Luis Perez (Kristov Martinez kick), 11:52. Lions 7–0. Drive: 7 plays, 97 yards, 3:08.
- UWF – Chris Schwarz 1-yard run (Austin Williams kick), 2:24. Tied 7–7. Drive: 10 plays, 49 yards, 4:45.
- TAMUC – Reggie Kincade 99-yard kick return (Kristov Martinez kick), 2:10. Lions 14–7.

Second quarter

- TAMUC – Kristov Martinez 29-yard field goal, 13:42. Lions 17–7. Drive: 6 plays, 70 yards, 2:21.
- TAMUC – Kristov Martinez 29-yard field goal, 8:51. Lions 20–7. Drive: 8 plays, 25 yards, 3:57.
- UWF – Antoine Griffin 20-yard pass from Mike Beaudry (Austin Williams kick), 0:58. Lions 20–14. Drive: 10 plays, 77 yards, 2:51.

Third quarter

- UWF – Austin Williams 27-yard field goal, 10:03. Lions 20–17. Drive: 4 plays, -5 yards, 1:58.
- TAMUC – E.J. Thompson 9-yard run (Kristov Martinez kick), 6:08. Lions 27–17. Drive: 10 plays, 62 yards, 3:52.
- UWF – Austin Williams 47-yard field goal, 1:57. Lions 27–20. Drive: 4 plays, 8 yards, 1:14.
- TAMUC – Marquis Wimberly 40-yard pass from Luis Perez (Kristov Martinez kick), 0:30. Lions 34–20. Drive: 4 plays, 61 yards, 1:21.

Fourth quarter

- TAMUC – Kristov Martinez 19-yard field goal, 7:41. Lions 37–20. Drive: 10 plays, 86 yards, 5:34.
- UWF – Chris Schwarz 3-yard run (Austin Williams kick), 4:45. Lions 37–27. Drive: 8 plays, 75 yards, 2:55.

Top passers

- UWF – Mike Beaudry – 22/48, 252 yards, TD, INT
- TAMUC – Luis Perez – 23/30, 323 yards, 2 TD, INT

Top rushers

- UWF – Chris Schwarz – 14 rushes, 45 yards, 2 TD
- TAMUC – E.J. Thompson – 21 rushes, 110 yards, TD

Top receivers

- UWF – Antoine Griffin – 8 receptions, 112 yards, TD
- TAMUC – Shawn Hooks – 4 receptions, 101 yards, TD

== Rankings ==
Ranking movements Legend: ██ Increase in ranking ██ Decrease in ranking
	Week													
Poll	Pre	1	2	3	4	5	6	7	8	9	10	11	12	Final
AFCA	5	3	3	3	2	2	11	10	9	9	8	8	8	1

== Statistics ==
=== Scoring ===
Scores against non-conference opponents

	1	2	3	4	OT	2OT	Total
Opponents	42	35	9	26	3	0	115
Texas A&M–Commerce	73	30	55	56	3	3	220

Scores against the Lone Star Conference

	1	2	3	4	Total
Opponents	22	46	48	20	136
Texas A&M–Commerce	110	86	73	68	337

Scores against all opponents

	1	2	3	4	OT	2OT	Total
Opponents	64	81	57	46	3	0	251
Texas A&M–Commerce	183	116	128	124	3	3	557
