= Riley Pickett =

Canadian gridiron football player (born 1997)

- Pickett with the BC Lions in 2026

No. 45 – BC Lions
- Positions: Fullback, long snapper
- Roster status: Active
- CFL status: National

Personal information
- Born: October 5, 1997 (age 29); Saskatoon, Saskatchewan, Canada
- Listed height: 6 ft 3 in (1.91 m)
- Listed weight: 250 lb (113 kg)

Career information
- High school: Centennial Collegiate
- CJFL: Saskatoon Hilltops
- University: Saskatchewan Huskies
- CFL draft: 2022: 5th round, 41st overall pick

Career history
- 2022–present: BC Lions

Awards and highlights
- 3× Canadian Bowl Champion(2015, 2016, 2017); IIAF World Champion with Team Canada (2016); 2× Hardy Cup Champion (2018, 2021); Uteck Bowl Champion & Defensive MVP (2021)
- Stats at CFL.ca

Riley Pickett (born October 5, 1997) is a Canadian professional football fullback and long snapper for the BC Lions of the Canadian Football League (CFL).

== Junior career ==
Pickett played for the Saskatoon Hilltops of the Canadian Junior Football League from 2015 to 2017. He won a Canadian Bowl championship in each of his three seasons with the Hilltops and was named the PFC Defensive Lineman of the Year in 2017 along with First Team All-Canadian Honours. He played in 29 games where he recorded 38 tackles, 24 assisted tackles, 16 special teams tackles, 15 sacks, 1 punt block, and two forced fumbles.

== University career ==
Pickett later joined the Saskatchewan Huskies of U Sports football and played for the team from 2018 to 2021. He played in 30 games where he had 110 total tackles, 14.5 sacks, 21 tackles for a loss, two forced fumbles, and two fumble recoveries. He won two Hardy Cup championships with the Huskies, in 2018 and 2021.

== Professional career ==
Pre-draft measurables
Height	Weight	40-yard dash	20-yard shuttle	Three-cone drill	Vertical jump	Broad jump	Bench press
6 ft 3 3/8 in (1.91 m)	249 lb (113 kg)	4.90 s	4.63 s	7.50 s	34.5 in (0.88 m)	9 ft 2 in (2.79 m)	26 reps
All values from CFL Combine

Pickett was drafted in the fifth round, 41st overall, by the BC Lions in the 2022 CFL draft and signed with the team on May 11, 2022. He played in ten games in 2022, where he had one defensive tackle and two special teams tackles.

During his 2022 exit interview with the team's co-general manager, Neil McEvoy, it was suggested that Pickett practice long snapping, since there was an opportunity at the position in the following season. Having never played the position, he practiced in the off-season with Saskatchewan Roughriders long snapper, Jorgen Hus, and eventually won the job following training camp. He played in all 18 regular season games in 2023 as the team's long snapper and also recorded seven special teams tackles.

During training camp in 2024, Pickett was in competition for the long snapper position with Kyle Nelson. Nelson became the long snapper for punts while Pickett retained the job for field goals. Pickett also learned to play fullback and switched to the offense after playing as a defensive lineman.

On January 13, 2025, Pickett signed a one-year contract extension to remain with BC for the 2025 season.

On December 12, 2025, Pickett re-signed with the Lions, on a two-year contract extension.

On October 17, 2026, Pickett was placed on the Lions' reserve roster after suffering a hip injury the previous week. On October 22, 2026, Pickett was shifted to the Lions' 1-game injured list. He rejoined the active roster on October 30, 2026, ahead of the Western Semi-Final.
