= Kader Kohou =

American football player (born 1998)

No. 38 – Buffalo Bills
- Position: Cornerback
- Roster status: Practice squad

Personal information
- Born: November 28, 1998 (age 27); Abidjan, Côte d’Ivoire
- Listed height: 5 ft 10 in (1.78 m)
- Listed weight: 197 lb (89 kg)

Career information
- High school: Trinity (Euless, Texas, U.S.)
- College: Texas A&M–Commerce (2016–2021)
- NFL draft: 2022: undrafted

Career history
- Miami Dolphins (2022–2025); Kansas City Chiefs (2026)*; Buffalo Bills (2026–present)*
- * Offseason or practice squad member only

Awards and highlights
- First-team All-LSC (2019); Second-team All-LSC (2018); NCAA Division II national champion (2017)

Career NFL statistics as of 2025
- Total tackles: 180
- Forced fumbles: 2
- Fumble recoveries: 2
- Pass deflections: 28
- Interceptions: 3
- Stats at Pro Football Reference

Nesmon Kader Joel Kohou (born November 28, 1998) is an Ivorian professional American football cornerback for the Buffalo Bills of the National Football League (NFL). He played college football for the Texas A&M–Commerce Lions.

== Early life ==
Kader Kohou was born on November 28, 1998, in Abidjan, Côte d'Ivoire and is the son of Elise Derou and Guy Kohou. He grew up in Euless, Texas and attended Trinity High School where he played football and ran track. During his senior season at Trinity he helped lead the Trinity Trojans to a district title and was named first-team all-district after leading the district in interceptions.

== College career ==
Kohou played football at Texas A&M University–Commerce. During his redshirt freshman season in 2017 he helped lead the Lions to a national championship title. During his career at A&M-Commerce he had 111 total tackles, five interceptions, four forced fumbles, three fumble recoveries and two defensive touchdowns, he also had 348 yards as a return specialist on special teams, He was named second team all-conference in the Lone Star Conference in 2018 and first team all-conference in 2019.

=== Pre-draft process ===
After concluding his collegiate career at Texas A&M University–Commerce, Kader Kohou was invited to participate in the 2022 Hula Bowl, a college football all-star game held in Orlando, Florida. His selection highlighted his performance at the Division II level and provided an opportunity to showcase his skills to professional scouts.

== Professional career ==
Pre-draft measurables
Height	Weight	Arm length	Hand span	Wingspan	40-yard dash	10-yard split	20-yard split	20-yard shuttle	Three-cone drill	Vertical jump	Broad jump	Bench press
5 ft 9 5/8 in (1.77 m)	193 lb (88 kg)	31 1/8 in (0.79 m)	9 1/2 in (0.24 m)	6 ft 1 7/8 in (1.88 m)	4.50 s	1.52 s	2.56 s	4.21 s	7.15 s	38.5 in (0.98 m)	10 ft 10 in (3.30 m)	19 reps
All values from Pro Day

=== Miami Dolphins ===
On April 30, 2022, Kohou signed with the Miami Dolphins as an undrafted free agent following the 2022 NFL draft. He was one of the 53 players included on the final roster after cuts, and made his NFL debut in Week 1 against the New England Patriots, having three tackles and a pass deflection.

On April 11, 2025, Kohou re-signed with the Dolphins on a one-year contract. He suffered a torn ACL in training camp and was ruled out for the 2025 season.

=== Kansas City Chiefs ===
On March 12, 2026, Kohou signed with the Kansas City Chiefs on a one-year, $1.81 million contract. On August 30, he was waived by the Chiefs as a part of final roster cuts. On September 1, the Chiefs re–signed Kohou to their practice squad. Kohou was released by the Chiefs on November 2, 2026.

=== Buffalo Bills ===
On November 5, 2026, Kohou signed with the Buffalo Bills practice squad.
