= Jalon Edwards-Cooper =

American gridiron football player (born 1997)

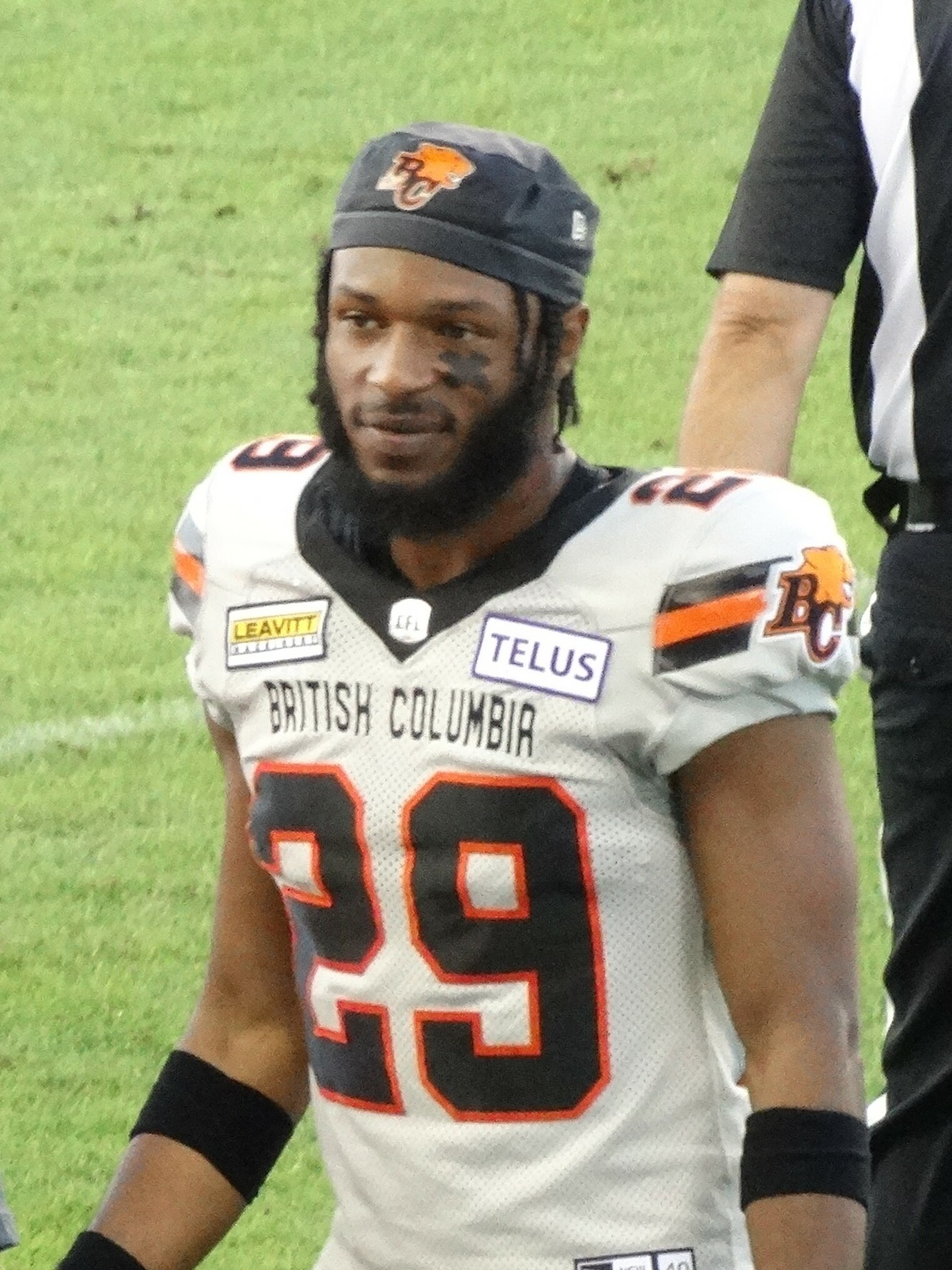
- Edwards-Cooper with the BC Lions in 2023

Profile
- Position: Defensive back

Personal information
- Born: February 18, 1997 (age 29); Spring, Texas, U.S.
- Listed height: 5 ft 11 in (1.80 m)
- Listed weight: 185 lb (84 kg)

Career information
- High school: Dekaney High
- College: Texas A&M–Commerce

Career history
- 2021–2023: BC Lions
- 2024: Saskatchewan Roughriders*
- 2024–2025: BC Lions
- * Offseason or practice squad member only

Awards and highlights
- NCAA Division II national champion (2017)
- Stats at CFL.ca

Jalon Edwards-Cooper (born February 18, 1997) is an American professional football defensive back.

== College career ==
After using a redshirt season in 2015, Edwards-Cooper played college football for the Texas A&M–Commerce Lions from 2016 to 2019. He played in 46 games where he had 141 total tackles, 18 tackles for loss, six sacks, and six interceptions. He was a member of the NCAA Division II Football Championship team in 2017.

== Professional career ==
=== BC Lions (first stint) ===
After not playing football in 2020, Edwards-Cooper signed with the BC Lions on June 16, 2021. He began the season on the practice roster, but made his professional debut on August 12, 2021, against the Calgary Stampeders where he recorded his first career interception. He played and started in nine regular season games in his rookie year where he had 29 defensive tackles, five pass knockdowns, and two interceptions.

In 2022, he played in seven regular season games where he recorded 14 defensive tackles and two pass knockdowns. During the 2023 season, he scored his first career touchdown after returning a blocked field goal 47 yards for a score on July 9, 2023, against the Montreal Alouettes. He became a free agent upon the expiry of his contract on February 13, 2024.

=== Saskatchewan Roughriders ===
On February 13, 2024, the Saskatchewan Roughriders announced that Edwards-Cooper had signed with the team. He was released on May 12, 2024.

=== BC Lions (second stint) ===
On September 3, 2024, it was announced that Edwards-Cooper had re-signed with the Lions. On July 26, 2025, Edwards-Cooper was placed on the Lions' 1-game injured list. He rejoined the active roster on September 4, 2025. On September 11, 2025, Edwards-Cooper was placed on the Lions' 6-game injured list, where he spent the remainder of the 2025 CFL season. On February 10, 2026, Edwards-Cooper became a free agent at the conclusion of his contract with the Lions.
