= Phillip Norman (Canadian football) =

American gridiron football player (born 1995)

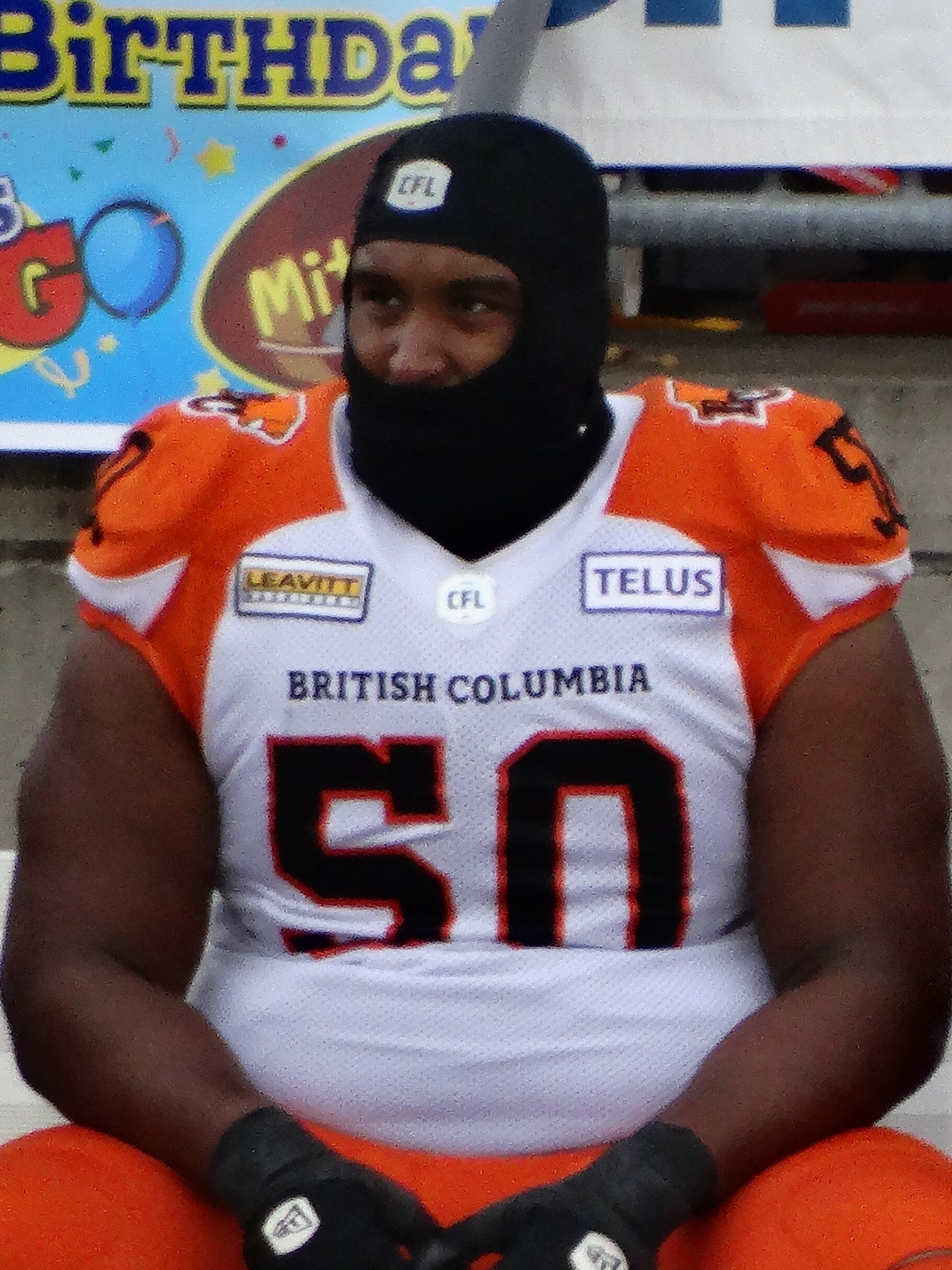
- Norman with the BC Lions in 2022

Profile
- Position: Offensive lineman

Personal information
- Born: August 22, 1995 (age 31); Sebastian, Florida, U.S.
- Listed height: 6 ft 4 in (1.93 m)
- Listed weight: 318 lb (144 kg)

Career information
- College: Bethune-Cookman

Career history
- 2018–2023: BC Lions
- 2024: Ottawa Redblacks*
- * Offseason or practice squad member only
- Stats at CFL.ca

Phillip Norman (born August 22, 1995) is an American professional football offensive lineman. He previously played for the BC Lions of the Canadian Football League (CFL).

== College career ==
After using a redshirt season in 2013, Norman played college football for the Bethune-Cookman Wildcats from 2014 to 2017. He played in 40 games over four years, including 11 starts at tackle in his senior year.

== Professional career ==
=== BC Lions ===
Norman signed with the BC Lions on May 9, 2018. At the conclusion of training camp, he was signed to the team's practice roster to begin the 2018 season, where he spent the entire year.

In 2019, he began the season on the practice roster for the first five games, but made his professional debut on July 20, 2019, against the Saskatchewan Roughriders where he started at center. He played and started in the final 13 games of the regular season, including 11 starts at center. He did not play in 2020 due to the cancellation of the 2020 CFL season.

As a pending free agent, Norman re-signed with the Lions on January 14, 2021. However, he was released following training camp on July 26, 2021. He re-signed with the team on September 2, 2021, and spent time on the practice roster before starting the final game of the regular season at left tackle. Norman re-signed with the Lions on December 30, 2021. He made the team's opening day roster for 2022 as the starting left guard. On June 14, 2023, Norman suffered a ‘significant medical episode’ prior to a practice early in the 2023 season. Practice was cancelled for the remainder of the day. He was released from the hospital on June 19, and returned to practice the following day. He became a free agent upon the expiry of his contract on February 13, 2024.

=== Ottawa Redblacks ===
On February 14, 2024, it was announced that Norman had signed with the Ottawa Redblacks. He was released on May 29, 2024.
