= 2017 NCAA Division II Football Championship Game =

2017 NCAA Division II Football Championship
West Florida Argonauts	Texas A&M–Commerce Lions
(11–3)	(13–1)
Gulf South	Lone Star
27	37
Head coach: Pete Shinnick	Head coach: Colby Carthel
Seed 4	Seed 2
	1	2	3	4	Total
West Florida	7	7	6	7	27
Texas A&M–Commerce	14	6	14	3	37
- Date: December 16, 2017
- Season: 2017
- Stadium: Children's Mercy Park
- Location: Kansas City, Kansas
- Referee: Dwight Neibling
- Attendance: 4,259

United States TV coverage
- Network: ESPN2

The 2017 NCAA Division II Football Championship Game was a postseason college football game that determined a national champion in NCAA Division II for the 2017 season. It was played at Children's Mercy Park in Kansas City, Kansas, on December 16, 2017, with kickoff at 5:00 p.m. EST (4:00 p.m. local CST), and television coverage on ESPN2.

== Teams ==
The participants of the 2017 NCAA Division II Football Championship Game were the finalists of the 2017 Division II Playoffs, which began with four 7-team brackets to determine super region champions, who then qualified for the national semifinals. The game featured the winners of those national semifinal games: No. 4 seed West Florida and No. 2 seed Texas A&M–Commerce (now known as East Texas A&M). This was the first meeting between the two teams and the first appearance for both teams in the championship game.

=== National semifinals ===
Super region champions were seeded 1 to 4 for the national semifinals.

Semifinals; December 9 Hosted by higher seeded team
1	IUP	17
4	West Florida	27
2	Texas A&M–Commerce	31
3	Harding	17

National Championship; December 16; Children's Mercy Park, Kansas City, KS
4	West Florida	27
2	Texas A&M–Commerce	37

== Game summary ==
2017 NCAA Division II Football Championship Game

Quarter	1	2	3	4	Total
No. 4 West Florida	7	7	6	7	27
No. 2 Texas A&M–Commerce	14	6	14	3	37

at Children's Mercy Park • Kansas City, Kansas

- Date: Saturday, December 16, 2017
- Game time: 5:00 p.m. EST (4:00 p.m. CST)
- Game weather: Clear • Temperature: 61 °F (16 °C) • Wind: SE 7 mph
- Game attendance: 4,259
- Referee: Dwight Neibling
- TV: ESPN2

Game information

First Quarter

- (11:52) TAMC – Luis Perez 50 yard pass to Shawn Hooks, Kristov Martinez kick (Drive: 7 plays, 97 yards, 3:08; Texas A&M–Commerce 7–0)
- (2:24) UWF – Chris Schwarz 1 yard rush, Austin Williams kick (Drive: 10 plays, 49 yards, 4:45; Tied 7–7)
- (2:10) TAMC – Reggie Kincade 99 yard kick return, Kristov Martinez kick (Texas A&M–Commerce 14–7)

Second Quarter

- (13:42) TAMC – Kristov Martinez 29 yard field goal (Drive: 6 plays, 70 yards, 2:21; Texas A&M–Commerce 17–7)
- (8:51) TAMC – Kristov Martinez 29 yard field goal (Drive: 8 plays, 25 yards, 3:57; Texas A&M–Commerce 20–7)
- (0:58) UWF – Mike Beaudry 20 yard pass to Antoine Griffin, Austin Williams kick (Drive: 10 plays, 77 yards, 2:51; Texas A&M–Commerce 20–14)

Third Quarter

- (10:03) UWF – Austin Williams 27 yard field goal (Drive: 4 plays, –5 yards, 1:58; Texas A&M–Commerce 20–17)
- (6:08) TAMC – E.J. Thompson 9 yard rush, Kristov Martinez kick (Drive: 10 plays, 62 yards, 3:52; Texas A&M–Commerce 27–17)
- (1:57) UWF – Austin Williams 47 yard field goal (Drive: 4 plays, 8 yards, 1:14; Texas A&M–Commerce 27–20)
- (0:03) TAMC – Luis Perez 40 yard pass to Marquis Wimberly, Kristov Martinez kick (Drive: 4 plays, 61 yards, 1:21; Texas A&M–Commerce 34–20)

Fourth Quarter

- (7:41) TAMC – Kristov Martinez 19 yard field goal (Drive: 10 plays, 86 yards, 5:34; Texas A&M–Commerce 37–20)
- (4:45) UWF – Chris Schwarz 3 yard rush, Austin Williams kick (Drive: 8 plays, 75 yards, 2:55; Texas A&M–Commerce 37–27)

=== Statistics ===
Statistics	UWF	TAMC
First downs	20	24
Plays–yards	71–276	73–477
Rushes–yards	23–24	40–154
Passing yards	252	323
Passing: Comp–Att–Int	22–48–1	23–33–2
Time of possession	27:35	32:25

Team	Category	Player	Statistics
West Florida	Passing	Mike Beaudry	22/48, 252 yards, 1 TD, 1 INT
West Florida	Rushing	Chris Schwarz	14 carries, 45 yards, 2 TD
West Florida	Receiving	Antoine Griffin	8 receptions, 112 yards, 1 TD
Texas A&M–Commerce	Passing	Luis Perez	23/30, 323 yards, 2 TD, 1 INT
Texas A&M–Commerce	Rushing	E.J. Thompson	21 carries, 110 yards, 1 TD
Texas A&M–Commerce	Receiving	Shawn Hooks	4 receptions, 104 yards, 1 TD
