= Neil McEvoy (Canadian football) =

Canadian gridiron football administrator

BC Lions
- Title: Co-general manager Director of football operations

Personal information
- Born: October 28, 1974 (age 52); Surrey, British Columbia, Canada

Career information
- CJFL: Surrey Rams

Career history
- 1999–2013: BC Lions (Player Personnel Coordinator)
- 2014–2017: BC Lions (Director of Player Personnel)
- 2014–2024: BC Lions (Director of Football Operations)
- 2021–2024: BC Lions (Co-General Manager)
- 2025–present: BC Lions (President of Football Operations)

Awards and highlights
- 3x Grey Cup champion (2000, 2006, 2011)

Neil McEvoy (born October 28, 1974) is the president of football operations for the BC Lions of the Canadian Football League (CFL).

== Junior career ==
McEvoy played as a wide receiver for the Surrey Rams of the Canadian Junior Football League.

== Administrative career ==
McEvoy was first hired by the BC Lions as a ticket sales representative in 1995 and moved to media relations in 1997. He then moved to the football operations department in 1999 where he was named the team's Player Personnel Coordinator.

On February 11, 2014, McEvoy was promoted to Director of Football Operations and Player Personnel. In advance of the 2018 BC Lions season, he was retained as the Director of Football Operations while relinquishing the title of Director of Player Personnel to Torey Hunter. Following the resignation of Ed Hervey, McEvoy was named Co-General Manager alongside Rick Campbell, in addition to his title of Director of Football Operations, on December 7, 2020. Following the 2024 season, Campbell was fired and McEvoy was promoted to president of football operations. They were succeeded by Ryan Rigmaiden as general manager.

== Personal life ==
McEvoy lives in Surrey, British Columbia, with his partner, Keri, and has two sons, Logan and Spencer. McEvoy's father, Clayton McEvoy, played as a fullback for the Winnipeg Blue Bombers from 1970 to 1975.
