= 2025 UT Permian Basin Falcons football team =

American college football season

2025 UT Permian Basin Falcons football

NCAA Division II Quarterfinal, L 28–34 vs. Harding
- Conference: Lone Star Conference

Ranking
- AFCA: No. 5
- Record: 11–3 (7–2 LSC)
- Head coach: Kris McCullough (3rd season)
- Co-offensive coordinators: Blake Crandall (3rd season); Kenny Hrncir (2nd season)
- Offensive scheme: Hurry-up, no-huddle spread
- Defensive coordinator: Jake Shaw (2nd season)
- Co-defensive coordinator: Devin Gauldin (2nd season)
- Base defense: 4–2–5
- Home stadium: Astound Broadband Stadium; Ratliff Stadium

2025 Lone Star Conference football standings
	Conf.			Overall
Team	W		L	W		L
No. 13 Central Washington $^	9	–	0	10	–	2
No. 5 UT Permian Basin ^	7	–	2	11	–	3
Western Oregon	7	–	2	8	–	3
West Texas A&M #	7	–	2	8	–	4
Angelo State	4	–	5	6	–	5
Texas A&M–Kingsville	4	–	5	5	–	6
Eastern New Mexico	3	–	6	3	–	8
Midwestern State	3	–	6	3	–	8
Western New Mexico	1	–	8	2	–	9
Sul Ross *	0	–	9	0	–	11
$ – Conference champion; ^ – NCAA Division II playoff participant; # – Heritage Bowl participant * – Ineligible for postseason play due to transition from NCAA Division III; Rankings from AFCA poll

The 2025 UT Permian Basin Falcons football team represented the University of Texas Permian Basin (UTPB) in the 2025 NCAA Division II football season as a member of the Lone Star Conference (LSC). The Falcons were led by third-year head coach Kris McCullough. The team played most of its home games at Astound Broadband Stadium in Midland, Texas while Ratliff Stadium in neighboring Odessa hosted one game.

The Falcons finished the regular season with an overall record of 9–2, going 7–2 in LSC play to finish in a three-way tie for second in the conference. The team received a bid for the NCAA Division II playoffs, facing off against CSU Pueblo in the first round. The no. 10 Falcons defeated the no. 4 ThunderWolves 37–24 for the first playoff win in program history. In the second round, the Falcons defeated no. 15 Western Colorado, 21–15, in overtime, after being down 15–0 in the fourth quarter.

On December 23, McCullough announced that he would be stepping down as the Falcons' head coach, with assistant head coach Mike Babcock being named interim coach. Later that day it was revealed that McCullough had been hired as the new head coach for Gardner–Webb. On December 31, Lubbock Christian School head coach Chris Softley was hired as the Falcons' new head coach.

== Offseason ==
=== Transfers ===
Incoming

Name	Pos.	Height	Weight	Hometown	Prev. school
Cash Walker	TE	6'4"	235 lbs	Grand Junction, CO	Colorado Mesa
Caleb Sedegan	TE	6'5"	255 lbs	Longmont, CO	Dodge City
Torbyn Eakins	OL	6'5"	315 lbs	New Oxford, PA	Morehead State
Brittyn Eakins	LB	6'0"	205 lbs	New Oxford, PA	Morehead State
Austin Ayobamidele	WR	6'2"	180 lbs	Brooklyn Park, MN	Iowa Central
Kyle Lofye	OL	6'3"	315 lbs	Frisco, TX	East Texas A&M
Angel Valencia	OL	6'4"	300 lbs	Chico, CA	Butte
Jaylon Tillman	WR	6'0"	215 lbs	Plainfield, IL	Bowling Green
Braylon Stewart	OL	6'5"	320 lbs	Fort Worth, TX	Southwest Baptist
Daine Horak	S	6'0"	185 lbs	Rockwall, TX	Texas State
Andre Jones	WR	6'4"	185 lbs	San Antonio, TX	Coastal Carolina
Cochese Bradshaw	CB	6'3"	190 lbs	Crenshaw, CA	Mary
Kanon Gibson	QB	6'1"	190 lbs	Wink, TX	West Texas A&M
Diego Nunez	WR	6'1"	190 lbs	Roswell, NM	New Mexico Military
Bryan Pry	DL	6'1"	270 lbs	Odessa, TX	Eastern New Mexico
Karson Seaman	OL	6'4"	280 lbs	Chico, CA	College of the Sequoias

== LSC media poll ==
The Lone Star Conference released its preseason prediction poll on July 24, 2025. The Falcons were predicted to finish third in the conference and also received two first-place votes.

== Schedule ==
Date	Time	Opponent	Rank	Site	Result	Attendance
August 30	12:00 p.m.	No. 5 Central Oklahoma*		Astound Broadband Stadium; Midland, TX	W 34–14	1,523
September 6	7:00 p.m.	at Adams State*	No. 21	Rex Stadium; Alamosa, CO	W 41–7	200
September 20	7:00 p.m.	at Texas A&M–Kingsville	No. 11	Javelina Stadium; Kingsville, TX	W 43–30	8,500
September 27	6:00 p.m.	Midwestern State	No. 11	Astound Broadband Stadium; Midland, TX	W 37–15	3,413
October 4	6:00 p.m.	at No. 5 Angelo State	No. 9	LeGrand Sports Complex; San Angelo, TX	W 28–14	4,989
October 11	6:00 p.m.	No. 13 Central Washington	No. 6	Ratliff Stadium; Odessa, TX	L 14–27	2,574
October 18	3:05 p.m.	at Western Oregon	No. 13	McArthur Field; Monmouth, OR	L 28–31	1,397
October 25	6:00 p.m.	West Texas A&M^{†}	No. 23	Astound Broadband Stadium; Midland, TX	W 22–6	2,543
November 1	1:00 p.m.	at Western New Mexico	No. 20	Altamirano Stadium; Silver City, NM	W 66–7	200
November 8	7:00 p.m.	Eastern New Mexico	No. 17	Astound Broadband Stadium; Midland, TX	W 47–34	2,122
November 15	7:00 p.m.	Sul Ross	No. 15	Astound Broadband Stadium; Midland, TX	W 74–10	2,572
November 22	2:00 p.m.	at No. 4 CSU Pueblo*	No. 10	ThunderBowl; Pueblo, CO (NCAA Division II First Round)	W 37–24	2,372
November 29	2:00 p.m.	at No. 15 Western Colorado*	No. 10	Mountaineer Bowl; Gunnison, CO (NCAA Division II Second Round)	W 21–15 ^{OT}	1,783
December 6	1:00 p.m.	at No. 2 Harding*	No. 10	First Security Stadium; Searcy, AR (NCAA Division II Quarterfinal)	L 28–34	2,775
*Non-conference game; ^{†}Homecoming; Rankings from AFCA Poll released prior to the game; All times are in Central time

== Rankings ==
Ranking movements Legend: ██ Increase in ranking ██ Decrease in ranking — = Not ranked RV = Received votes
	Week													
Poll	Pre	1	2	3	4	5	6	7	8	9	10	11	12	Final
AFCA	RV	21	12	11	11	9	6	13	23	20	17	15	10	5
D2 Football	—	16	10	7	7	7	4	11	18	17	16	13	11	3

== Personnel ==
2025 UT Permian Basin Falcons football team roster
Players
Coaches
Offense

Pos.	#	Name	Class
RB	0	Camden Tyler	Jr
WR	2	Traylen Suel	Jr
WR	3	T. J. McKenzie	GS
QB	4	Kanon Gibson	Jr
RB	5	Kory Harris	Sr
WR	8	Jace Wyatt	Sr
WR	10	Ben Patterson	Sr
QB	12	Christian Kaopua	Sr
WR	13	Jaylon Tillman	GS
QB	14	Solomon James	GS
QB	15	Issac Mooring	So
WR	18	Austin Ayobamidele	Jr
WR	19	Anthony Dansby	Sr
RB	22	Adrian Cormier	Jr
RB	37	Damien Johnson	Fr
TE	40	Kelby Castro	Fr
OL	50	Tyler Ball	GS
OL	52	Mekhi Pinckney	GS
OL	53	Joseph Hughes	Jr
OL	56	David Baker	Fr
OL	58	Christopher Jernigan	Fr
OL	59	Case Carpenter	Fr
OL	61	Donavon Kapa	Fr
OL	62	Diego Jaurez	Fr
OL	63	Justin Greene	Fr
TE	64	Cash Walker	So
OL	65	Kyle Lofye	So
OL	66	Girevis Bobey	So
OL	68	Jared Risinger	Fr
OL	69	Lucas Barrientes	Fr
OL	70	Mason Schweinle	Jr
OL	71	Caleb Morman	Fr
OL	72	Nate Jacobs	So
OL	75	Torbyn Eakins	Jr
OL	77	Braylon Stewart	So
OL	78	Daine Hanson	Jr
OL	79	Damien Thomas	Jr
WR	80	Kylin Mathis	GS
WR	81	Crimson Mathis	So
WR	82	Bryant Johnson	GS
WR	83	Heston Kelly	Jr
WR	84	Jonathan Brown	So
WR	85	Aiden Serrano	Fr
TE	86	Braelyn Dillard	So
TE	87	Caleb Sedegan	Jr
WR	88	Diego Nunez	Jr
WR		Gavin Brown	Fr
QB		Jiyere Cogshell	Fr
WR		Adrian Corley	Fr
QB		Mikey Cota	Fr
QB		Aaron DeLeon	Fr
QB		Micah Dickerson	Fr
RB		Isaiah Dowden	Fr
WR		Nick Jackson	Fr
WR		Josh Little	Jr
WR		Malachi Meche	Fr
RB		Damuriyon Montgomery	Sr
WR		Kohen Peeler	Fr

Defense

Pos.	#	Name	Class
DL	0	Malik Allen	Sr
LB	1	Tristan Exline	Jr
DB	3	Jamarion Ravenell	Jr
DL	5	Jacob Humphrey	Sr
DL	6	Jalani Jefferson	Sr
DB	7	Kharel Coney	Sr
DB	9	Kendrick Jones	Jr
DL	11	Gary Holmes	Sr
DB	16	Elijah Gerrard	So
DB	17	Cheno Navarrette	Fr
DB	20	Layne Horak	Jr
DB	21	David Vah	Fr
DB	23	Nicholas Butler	So
DB	24	Caimon Mathis	So
LB	26	Taison Fa'asuamanu	Sr
DB	27	Jayden Plater	So
DB	28	Jerrod Cameron	Jr
DB	29	Euvoski Cunningham	Sr
DB	31	Elliott Grigsby	Jr
DB	32	Champ Mathis	GS
DB	33	Dominique Lampkin	Jr
DB	34	Jayden Freidt	Jr
DL	35	Johnny Fano	Jr
DL	36	Luke Miller	So
LB	38	Gabe Ponce	Jr
LB	42	Tre Yanez	So
DB	43	Evan Williams	So
DL	44	Zamir Richardson	Jr
LB	45	McKyle So'oto	Jr
LB	46	Devin Green	Fr
DB	47	Dawson Bullard	So
LB	51	Tyreek Curley	Jr
DL	54	Lyndon Williams	Jr
LB	55	Raydin Garcia	Fr
LB	57	Warren Richardson	Fr
DL	60	Terry Ojopagogo	Fr
OL	67	Tymir Askew	Fr
DL	73	Ephraim Whitaker	Fr
DL	74	Nicholas Elko	Fr
DL	76	Jack Freeman	Fr
DL	90	Anthony Cunningham	Jr
DL	91	Dominic Conner	Jr
DL	92	Malotumau Fano	So
DL	93	Dieunerst Collin	Jr
DL	94	David Walker	Jr
DL	95	Geoffrey Ojeh	Fr
DL	96	Clive Wahl	Fr
DL	97	Will LeBlanc	Fr
DL	99	Amari Bedford	Sr
DB		Shawn Battle	Fr
LB		Kayden Blaze	So
DB		Messiah Boulieu	Fr
DB		Jaiden Fike	Fr
DB		Rene Holguin	Sr
DB		Canden Mathis	Fr
DB		John Peoples	Fr
LB		Luke Sigler	Fr
LB		Adam White	Fr
DB		Dwayne Wingfield	Fr

Special teams

Pos.	#	Name	Class
K	30	Diego Chavarria	So
P	39	Jolon Cabello	Fr
K	41	Angel Diaz	So
LS	48	Carson Loeb	Fr
P	49	Jordan Cartwright	Fr

Head coach

- Kris McCullough

Coordinators/assistant coaches

- Mike Babcock
  Assistant head coach/Offensive line
- Blake Crandall
  Co-offensive coordinator/Wide receivers
- Kenny Hrncir
  Co-offensive coordinator/Quarterbacks
- Jake Shaw
  Defensive coordinator/Inside linebackers
- Devin Gaulden
  Co-defensive coordinator/Secondary
- Zach Santolla
  Defensive line/Run game coordinator
- Marquez Gollman
  Safeties
- Jordan Moore
  Nickels/Stars
- Austrian Robinson
  Assistant defensive line
- Ryver Rodriguez
  Running backs
- Andrew Vasquez
  Assistant defensive backs
- Gunnar Abseck
  Tight ends
- Ivan Schultz
  Assistant offensive line
- Brittyn Eakins
  Linebackers

Legend

- (C) Team captain
- (S) Suspended
- (I) Ineligible
- Injured
- Redshirt

Roster
Last update: August 21, 2025

== Game summaries ==
=== No. 5 Central Oklahoma ===
No. 5 Central Oklahoma Bronchos at UT Permian Basin Falcons – Game summary

Quarter	1	2	3	4	Total
No. 5 Bronchos	0	7	7	0	14
Falcons	7	6	18	3	34

at Astound Broadband Stadium, Midland, Texas

- Date: August 30
- Game time: 12:00 p.m. CDT
- Game weather: Cloudy
- Game attendance: 1,523
- Referee: Joe Greer
- Box score, Recap

Game information
First quarter
- UTPB – Ben Patterson 24-yard pass from Kanon Gibson (Angel Diaz kick), 3:00. Falcons 7–0. Drive: 13 plays, 97 yards, 6:46.

Second quarter

- UTPB – Angel Diaz 20-yard field goal, 7:52. Falcons 10–0. Drive: 7 plays, 31 yards, 2:50.
- UCO – William Mason 4-yard run (Joseph Kim kick), 7:35. Falcons 10–7. Drive: 2 plays, 75 yards, 0:17.
- UTPB – Angel Diaz 39-yard field goal, 1:56. Falcons 13–7. Drive: 8 plays, 17 yards, 3:11.

Third quarter

- UCO – Jaylen Cottrell 35-yard run (Joseph Kim kick), 13:20. Bronchos 14–13. Drive: 5 plays, 73 yards, 1:09.
- UTPB – Camden Tyler 12-yard run (Jolon Cabello pass to Caleb Sedegan), 4:44. Falcons 21–14. Drive: 9 plays, 76 yards, 3:44.
- UTPB – Traylen Suel 62-yard pass from Kanon Gibson (Angel Diaz kick), 3:53. Falcons 28–14. Drive: 2 plays, 62 yards, 0:18.
- UTPB – Angel Diaz 44-yard field goal, 0:35. Falcons 31–14. Drive: 4 plays, 13 yards, 1:39.

Fourth quarter

- UTPB – Angel Diaz 24-yard field goal, 1:00. Falcons 34–14. Drive: 7 plays, 33 yards, 2:34.

Statistics	UCO	UTPB
First downs	16	24
Total yards	376	361
Rushing yards	207	145
Passing yards	169	216
Turnovers	2	0
Time of possession	22:45	37:15

Team	Category	Player	Statistics
Central Oklahoma	Passing	Jett Huff	14/34, 169 yards, 2 INT
Central Oklahoma	Rushing	William Mason	9 rushes, 107 yards, TD
Central Oklahoma	Receiving	Ashton Schumann	3 receptions, 45 yards
UT Permian Basin	Passing	Kanon Gibson	17/30, 189 yards, 2 TD
UT Permian Basin	Rushing	Kanon Gibson	20 rushes, 78 yards
UT Permian Basin	Receiving	Traylen Suel	7 receptions, 95 yards, TD

Kickoff was originally scheduled for 6:00 p.m., but was moved up to noon due to potential thunderstorms.

=== At Adams State ===
No. 21 UT Permian Basin Falcons at Adams State Grizzlies – Game summary

Quarter	1	2	3	4	Total
No. 21 Falcons	7	13	14	7	41
Grizzlies	0	0	7	0	7

at Rex Stadium, Alamosa, Colorado

- Date: September 6
- Game time: 7:00 p.m. CDT/6:00 p.m. MDT
- Game weather: Sunny
- Game attendance: 200
- Referee: Richard Gray
- Box score, Recap

Game information
First quarter
- UTPB – Jaylon Tillman 7-yard pass from Issac Mooring (Angel Diaz kick), 0:25. Falcons 7–0. Drive: 10 plays, 76 yards, 4:05.

Second quarter

- UTPB – Jamarion Ravenell 96-yard interception return (kick failed), 14:03. Falcons 13–0.
- UTPB – T. J. McKenzie 19-yard pass from Issac Mooring (Angel Diaz kick), 7:34. Falcons 20–0. Drive: 8 plays, 67 yards, 3:39.

Third quarter

- UTPB – Traylen Suel 36-yard pass from Issac Mooring (Angel Diaz kick), 12:18. Falcons 27–0. Drive: 1 play, 36 yards, 0:06.
- UTPB – Kory Harris 10-yard run (Angel Diaz kick), 5:57. Falcons 34–0. Drive: 8 plays, 80 yards, 3:16.
- ASU – Ahmare Merrida 15-yard run (Quinton Pacheco kick), 0:44. Falcons 34–7. Drive: 13 plays, 90 yards, 5:10.

Fourth quarter

- UTPB – Kory Harris 3-yard run (Angel Diaz kick), 12:15. Falcons 41–7. Drive: 8 plays, 71 yards, 3:23.

Statistics	UTPB	ASU
First downs	21	17
Total yards	359	243
Rushing yards	84	231
Passing yards	275	12
Turnovers	1	1
Time of possession	23:22	36:38

Team	Category	Player	Statistics
UT Permian Basin	Passing	Issac Mooring	20/26, 266 yards, 3 TD
UT Permian Basin	Rushing	Kory Harris	11 rushes, 54 yards, 2 TD
UT Permian Basin	Receiving	T. J. McKenzie	4 receptions, 78 yards, TD
Adams State	Passing	Tyson Smith	4/14, 12 yards, INT
Adams State	Rushing	Ahmare Merrida	18 rushes, 134 yards, TD
Adams State	Receiving	Devin Dawkins	2 receptions, 10 yards

=== At Texas A&M–Kingsville ===
No. 11 UT Permian Basin Falcons at Texas A&M–Kingsville Javelinas – Game summary

Quarter	1	2	3	4	Total
No. 11 Falcons	6	10	7	20	43
Javelinas	0	8	8	14	30

at Javelina Stadium, Kingsville, Texas

- Date: September 20
- Game time: 7:00 p.m. CDT
- Game weather: Sunny
- Game attendance: 8,500
- Box score, Recap

Game information
First quarter
- UTPB – Kanon Gibson 3-yard run (pass failed), 9:13. Falcons 6–0. Drive: 11 plays, 75 yards, 5:47.

Second quarter

- UTPB – Angel Diaz 28-yard field goal, 13:29. Falcons 9–0. Drive: 10 plays, 49 yards, 5:00.
- UTPB – Kory Harris 1-yard run (Angel Diaz kick), 8:49. Falcons 16–0. Drive: 7 plays, 32 yards, 3:18.
- TAMUK – Lawrence Starks 2-yard run (Jack Turner pass to Kehinde Atunrase), 7:06. Falcons 16–8. Drive: 3 plays, 9 yards, 0:24.

Third quarter

- TAMUK – Jack Turner 12-yard run (Jack Turner pass to Ivan Thomas), 11:43. Tied 16–16. Drive: 4 plays, 65 yards, 1:26.
- UTPB – Jace Wyatt 21-yard pass from Kanon Gibson (Angel Diaz kick), 7:43. Falcons 23–16. Drive: 8 plays, 75 yards, 4:00.

Fourth quarter

- TAMUK – Kevin Holmes Jr. 12-yard pass from Jack Turner (Daniel Gauna kick), 13:32. Tied 23–23. Drive: 9 plays, 44 yards, 2:52.
- UTPB – Kanon Gibson 20-yard run (Angel Diaz kick), 12:11. Falcons 30–23. Drive: 2 plays, 70 yards, 1:17.
- UTPB – Jaylon Tillman 70-yard pass from Kanon Gibson (Angel Diaz kick), 10:07. Falcons 37–23. Drive: 1 play, 70 yards, 0:10.
- UTPB – T. J. McKenzie 34-yard pass from Kanon Gibson (kick failed), 8:10. Falcons 43–23. Drive: 2 plays, 36 yards, 0:51.
- TAMUK – Kehinde Atunrase 22-yard pass from Jack Turner (Daniel Gauna kick), 4:16. Falcons 43–30. Drive: 11 plays, 98 yards, 3:48.

Statistics	UTPB	TAMUK
First downs	26	18
Total yards	491	375
Rushing yards	175	105
Passing yards	316	270
Turnovers	0	3
Time of possession	36:52	23:08

Team	Category	Player	Statistics
UT Permian Basin	Passing	Kanon Gibson	18/26, 316 yards, 3 TD
UT Permian Basin	Rushing	Kanon Gibson	22 rushes, 81 yards, 2 TD
UT Permian Basin	Receiving	Jaylon Tillman	3 receptions, 92 yards, TD
Texas A&M–Kingsville	Passing	Jack Turner	25/37, 270 yards, 2 TD, 2 INT
Texas A&M–Kingsville	Rushing	Andre Branch	7 rushes, 42 yards
Texas A&M–Kingsville	Receiving	Christian Kretz	6 receptions, 83 yards

=== Midwestern State ===
Midwestern State Mustangs at No. 11 UT Permian Basin Falcons – Game summary

Quarter	1	2	3	4	Total
Mustangs	0	0	2	13	15
No. 11 Falcons	7	24	6	0	37

at Astound Broadband Stadium, Midland, Texas

- Date: September 27
- Game time: 6:00 p.m. CDT
- Game weather: Sunny
- Game attendance: 3,413
- Referee: Neil Dilts
- Box score, Recap

Game information
First quarter
- UTPB – Caleb Sedegan 9-yard pass from Kanon Gibson (Angel Diaz kick), 4:20. Falcons 7–0. Drive: 12 plays, 69 yards, 5:43.

Second quarter

- UTPB – Kory Harris 1-yard run (Angel Diaz kick), 13:21. Falcons 14–0. Drive: 11 plays, 58 yards, 3:57.
- UTPB – Camden Tyler 24-yard run (Angel Diaz kick), 11:44. Falcons 21–0. Drive: 2 plays, 28 yards, 0:25.
- UTPB – Ben Patterson 46-yard pass from Kanon Gibson (Angel Diaz kick), 7:13. Falcons 28–0. Drive: 5 plays, 81 yards, 3:06.
- UTPB – Angel Diaz 36-yard field goal, 1:55. Falcons 31–0. Drive: 11 plays, 52 yards, 4:01.

Third quarter

- UTPB – Jaylon Tillman 42-yard pass from Kanon Gibson (kick blocked), 10:22. Falcons 37–0. Drive: 2 plays, 62 yards, 0:36.
- MSU – Amani Pressley 93-yard defensive PAT return, 10:22. Falcons 37–2.

Fourth quarter

- MSU – Kelby Hickerson 2-yard pass from Sean Jastrab (Kohen Maroney kick), 5:56. Falcons 37–9. Drive: 8 plays, 47 yards, 3:22.
- MSU – Noah Bustard 25-yard fumble return (pass failed), 5:24. Falcons 37–15.

Statistics	MSU	UTPB
First downs	16	31
Total yards	296	564
Rushing yards	93	94
Passing yards	203	470
Turnovers	1	3
Time of possession	25:08	34:52

Team	Category	Player	Statistics
Midwestern State	Passing	Sean Jastrab	12/20, 132 yards, TD, INT
Midwestern State	Rushing	Reginald Williams	11 rushes, 70 yards
Midwestern State	Receiving	Demonte Greene	8 receptions, 74 yards
UT Permian Basin	Passing	Kanon Gibson	21/29, 331 yards, 3 TD
UT Permian Basin	Rushing	Camden Tyler	5 rushes, 32 yards, TD
UT Permian Basin	Receiving	Jaylon Tillman	5 receptions, 102 yards, TD

=== At No. 5 Angelo State ===
No. 9 UT Permian Basin Falcons at No. 5 Angelo State Rams – Game summary

Quarter	1	2	3	4	Total
No. 9 Falcons	7	14	0	7	28
No. 5 Rams	0	7	7	0	14

at LeGrand Sports Complex, San Angelo, Texas

- Date: October 4
- Game time: 6:00 p.m. CDT
- Game weather: Sunny, 84 °F (29 °C)
- Game attendance: 4,989
- Referee: Eric Smith
- Box score, Recap

Game information
First quarter
- UTPB – Kanon Gibson 1-yard run (Angel Diaz kick), 1:18. Falcons 7–0. Drive: 16 plays, 67 yards, 6:35.

Second quarter

- UTPB – Kanon Gibson 2-yard run (Angel Diaz kick), 8:34. Falcons 14–0. Drive: 9 plays, 65 yards, 3:56.
- ASU – Corey Sandolph 2-yard pass from Braeden Fuller (Rance Purser kick), 3:53. Falcons 14–7. Drive: 9 plays, 72 yards, 4:41.
- UTPB – Kanon Gibson 2-yard run (Angel Diaz kick), 0:22. Falcons 21–7. Drive: 9 plays, 75 yards, 3:31.

Third quarter

- ASU – Anthony Jones 32-yard pass from Braeden Fuller (Rance Purser kick), 1:16. Falcons 21–14. Drive: 3 plays, 49 yards, 0:48.

Fourth quarter

- UTPB – T. J. McKenzie 9-yard pass from Kanon Gibson (Angel Diaz kick), 0:18. Falcons 28–14. Drive: 10 plays, 55 yards, 4:32.

Statistics	UTPB	ASU
First downs	21	13
Total yards	347	252
Rushing yards	58	69
Passing yards	289	183
Turnovers	2	0
Time of possession	35:21	24:39

Team	Category	Player	Statistics
UT Permian Basin	Passing	Kanon Gibson	26/40, 289 yards, TD, 2 INT
UT Permian Basin	Rushing	Kanon Gibson	23 rushes, 39 yards, 3 TD
UT Permian Basin	Receiving	Diego Nunez	4 receptions, 60 yards
Angelo State	Passing	Braeden Fuller	13/25, 183 yards, 2 TD
Angelo State	Rushing	Jayden Jones	9 rushes, 37 yards
Angelo State	Receiving	Anthony Jones	3 receptions, 77 yards, TD

=== No. 13 Central Washington ===
No. 13 Central Washington Wildcats at No. 6 UT Permian Basin Falcons – Game summary

Quarter	1	2	3	4	Total
No. 13 Wildcats	0	3	7	17	27
No. 6 Falcons	7	0	7	0	14

at Ratliff Stadium, Odessa, Texas

- Date: October 11
- Game time: 6:00 p.m. CDT
- Game weather: Sunny
- Game attendance: 2,574
- Referee: Xavier Velazquez
- Box score, Recap

Game information
First quarter
- UTPB – T. J. McKenzie 8-yard pass from Kanon Gibson (Angel Diaz kick), 10:57. Falcons 7–0. Drive: 12 plays, 75 yards, 4:03.

Second quarter

- CWU – David Weber 40-yard field goal, 0:27. Falcons 7–3. Drive: 6 plays, 48 yards, 1:15.

Third quarter

- CWU – Justice Taylor 24-yard run (David Weber kick), 1:22. Wildcats 10–7. Drive: 12 plays, 63 yards, 6:36.
- UTPB – Ben Patterson 73-yard pass from Kanon Gibson (Angel Diaz kick), 0:31. Falcons 14–10. Drive: 2 plays, 75 yards, 0:51.

Fourth quarter

- CWU – Kennedy McGill 6-yard run (David Weber kick), 3:15. Wildcats 17–14. Drive: 10 plays, 56 yards, 6:14.
- CWU – David Weber 44-yard field goal, 0:44. Wildcats 20–14. Drive: 4 plays, 6 yards, 1:01.
- CWU – Javonte Walker 35-yard interception return (David Weber kick), 0:18. Wildcats 27–14.

Statistics	CWU	UTPB
First downs	17	14
Total yards	308	300
Rushing yards	238	50
Passing yards	70	250
Turnovers	1	1
Time of possession	38:15	21:45

Team	Category	Player	Statistics
Central Washington	Passing	Kennedy McGill	7/18, 70 yards
Central Washington	Rushing	Justice Taylor	20 rushes, 100 yards, TD
Central Washington	Receiving	Mason Juergens	3 receptions, 29 yards
UT Permian Basin	Passing	Kanon Gibson	16/39, 250 yards, 2 TD, INT
UT Permian Basin	Rushing	Kory Harris	5 rushes, 24 yards
UT Permian Basin	Receiving	Ben Patterson	1 reception, 73 yards, TD

=== At Western Oregon ===
No. 13 UT Permian Basin Falcons at Western Oregon Wolves – Game summary

Quarter	1	2	3	4	Total
No. 13 Falcons	0	7	7	14	28
Wolves	10	7	0	14	31

at McArthur Field, Monmouth, Oregon

- Date: October 18
- Game time: 3:05 p.m. CDT/1:05 p.m. PDT
- Game weather: Sunny
- Game attendance: 1,397
- Referee: Tracy Hernandez
- Box score, Recap

Game information
First quarter
- WOU – Logan South 25-yard field goal, 10:44. Wolves 3–0. Drive: 9 plays, 35 yards, 4:08.
- WOU – Jermaine Land 42-yard pass from Jordan McCarty (Logan South kick), 1:46. Wolves 10–0. Drive: 2 plays, 65 yards, 0:20.

Second quarter

- WOU – Carson Workman 3-yard run (Logan South kick), 1:56. Wolves 17–0. Drive: 8 plays, 58 yards, 4:01.
- UTPB – Kanon Gibson 4-yard run (Angel Diaz kick), 0:14. Wolves 17–7. Drive: 8 plays, 69 yards, 1:34.

Third quarter

- UTPB – T. J. McKenzie 36-yard pass from Kanon Gibson (Angel Diaz kick), 14:11. Wolves 17–14. Drive: 2 plays, 79 yards, 0:42.

Fourth quarter

- WOU – Keyvaun Eady 23-yard pass from Jordan McCarty (Logan South kick), 12:59. Wolves 24–14. Drive: 6 plays, 35 yards, 3:02.
- UTPB – Traylen Suel 4-yard pass from Kanon Gibson (Angel Diaz kick), 10:30. Wolves 24–21. Drive: 7 plays, 72 yards, 2:22.
- UTPB – Kanon Gibson 14-yard run (Angel Diaz kick), 6:46. Falcons 28–24. Drive: 6 plays, 59 yards, 2:52.
- WOU – Jordan McCarty 10-yard run (Logan South kick), 1:55. Wolves 31–28. Drive: 9 plays, 65 yards, 4:51.

Statistics	UTPB	WOU
First downs	28	21
Total yards	454	335
Rushing yards	106	169
Passing yards	348	166
Turnovers	2	0
Time of possession	28:04	31:56

Team	Category	Player	Statistics
UT Permian Basin	Passing	Kanon Gibson	28/40, 348 yards, 2 TD, INT
UT Permian Basin	Rushing	Kanon Gibson	17 rushes, 84 yards, 2 TD
UT Permian Basin	Receiving	Kylin Mathis	8 receptions, 118 yards
Western Oregon	Passing	Jordan McCarty	19/28, 166 yards, 2 TD
Western Oregon	Rushing	Jordan McCarty	12 rushes, 74 yards, TD
Western Oregon	Receiving	Jermaine Land	4 receptions, 56 yards, TD

=== West Texas A&M ===
West Texas A&M Buffaloes at No. 23 UT Permian Basin Falcons – Game summary

Quarter	1	2	3	4	Total
Buffaloes	0	6	0	0	6
No. 23 Falcons	10	7	2	3	22

at Astound Broadband Stadium, Midland, Texas

- Date: October 25
- Game time: 6:00 p.m. CDT
- Game weather: Sunny
- Game attendance: 2,543
- Referee: Jon Sasse
- Box score, Recap

Game information
First quarter
- UTPB – Traylen Suel 5-yard pass from Kanon Gibson (Angel Diaz kick), 9:47. Falcons 7–0. Drive: 12 plays, 75 yards, 5:13.
- UTPB – Angel Diaz 43-yard field goal, 2:56. Falcons 10–0. Drive: 11 plays, 48 yards, 5:20.

Second quarter

- UTPB – Jace Wyatt 14-yard pass from Kanon Gibson (Angel Diaz kick), 6:21. Falcons 17–0. Drive: 7 plays, 80 yards, 3:14.
- WT – Sean Johnson 5-yard pass from R. J. Martinez (kick failed), 4:55. Falcons 17–6. Drive: 7 plays, 75 yards, 1:26.

Third quarter

- UTPB – Team safety, 1:32. Falcons 19–6.

Fourth quarter

- UTPB – Angel Diaz 42-yard field goal, 11:31. Falcons 22–6. Drive: 10 plays, 26 yards, 5:01.

Statistics	WT	UTPB
First downs	6	30
Total yards	187	418
Rushing yards	18	125
Passing yards	169	293
Turnovers	0	0
Time of possession	13:46	46:14

Team	Category	Player	Statistics
West Texas A&M	Passing	R. J. Martinez	11/32, 169 yards, TD
West Texas A&M	Rushing	R. J. Martinez	5 rushes, 17 yards
West Texas A&M	Receiving	Jamir Roberts	2 receptions, 46 yards
UT Permian Basin	Passing	Kanon Gibson	29/45, 293 yards, 2 TD
UT Permian Basin	Rushing	Kory Harris	17 rushes, 70 yards
UT Permian Basin	Receiving	Traylen Suel	7 receptions, 72 yards, TD

=== At Western New Mexico ===
No. 20 UT Permian Basin Falcons at Western New Mexico Mustangs – Game summary

Quarter	1	2	3	4	Total
No. 20 Falcons	14	24	14	14	66
Mustangs	7	0	0	0	7

at Altamirano Stadium, Silver City, New Mexico

- Date: November 1
- Game time: 1:00 p.m. CDT/12:00 p.m. MDT
- Game weather: Sunny
- Game attendance: 200
- Referee: Steve Hill
- Box Score, Recap

Game information
First quarter
- UTPB – Kory Harris 12-yard run (Angel Diaz kick), 14:29. Falcons 7–0. Drive: 2 plays, 84 yards, 0:25.
- UTPB – Jace Wyatt 17-yard pass from Kanon Gibson (Angel Diaz kick), 9:11. Falcons 14–0. Drive: 9 plays, 83 yards, 2:52.
- WNMU – Connor Ackerley 8-yard run (Talan Tinsley kick), 0:08. Falcons 14–7. Drive: 12 plays, 72 yards, 4:53.

Second quarter

- UTPB – Jaylon Tillman 60-yard pass from Kanon Gibson (Braeylen Dillard run), 13:10. Falcons 22–7. Drive: 8 plays, 85 yards, 1:54.
- UTPB – Jalani Jefferson 35-yard interception return (kick failed), 12:57. Falcons 28–7.
- UTPB – Angel Diaz 16-yard field goal, 6:16. Falcons 31–7. Drive: 11 plays, 74 yards, 4:12.
- UTPB – Kory Harris 5-yard run (Angel Diaz kick), 3:02. Falcons 38–7. Drive: 3 plays, 12 yards, 0:32.

Third quarter

- UTPB – Camden Tyler 39-yard run (Angel Diaz kick), 11:46. Falcons 45–7. Drive: 4 plays, 60 yards, 1:01.
- UTPB – Ben Patterson 31-yard pass from Kanon Gibson (Angel Diaz kick), 9:10. Falcons 52–7. Drive: 3 plays, 52 yards, 0:39.

Fourth quarter

- UTPB – Diego Jaurez 3-yard pass from Issac Mooring (Angel Diaz kick), 10:52. Falcons 59–7. Drive: 8 plays, 73 yards, 3:52.
- UTPB – Adrian Cormier 9-yard run (Angel Diaz kick), 5:04. Falcons 66–7. Drive: 10 plays, 57 yards, 4:01.

Statistics	UTPB	WNMU
First downs	33	14
Total yards	658	182
Rushing yards	278	78
Passing yards	380	104
Turnovers	0	3
Time of possession	28:06	26:37

Team	Category	Player	Statistics
UT Permian Basin	Passing	Kanon Gibson	16/27, 323 yards, 3 TD
UT Permian Basin	Rushing	Kory Harris	17 rushes, 112 yards, 2 TD
UT Permian Basin	Receiving	Ben Patterson	3 receptions, 115 yards, TD
Western New Mexico	Passing	Connor Ackerley	13/28, 104 yards, 2 INT
Western New Mexico	Rushing	Jalen Murphy	5 rushes, 30 yards
Western New Mexico	Receiving	Anthony Flores	4 receptions, 40 yards

=== Eastern New Mexico ===
Eastern New Mexico Greyhounds at No. 17 UT Permian Basin Falcons – Game summary

Quarter	1	2	3	4	Total
Greyhounds	0	7	13	14	34
No. 17 Falcons	14	26	0	7	47

at Astound Broadband Stadium, Midland, Texas

- Date: November 8
- Game time: 7:00 p.m. CST
- Game weather: Clear
- Game attendance: 2,122
- Referee: Esrael Silva
- Box score, Recap

Game information
First quarter
- UTPB – Kory Harris 59-yard run (Angel Diaz kick), 10:13. Falcons 7–0. Drive: 3 plays, 63 yards, 0:43.
- UTPB – Kanon Gibson 7-yard run (Angel Diaz kick), 2:08. Falcons 14–0. Drive: 6 plays, 57 yards, 2:27.

Second quarter

- UTPB – Adrian Cormier 14-yard run (pass failed), 12:28. Falcons 20–0. Drive: 7 plays, 65 yards, 2:45.
- UTPB – Camden Tyler 34-yard run (Angel Diaz kick), 6:47. Falcons 27–0. Drive: 10 plays, 90 yards, 3:51.
- ENMU – Robert Nora 7-yard pass from Chad Ragle (Ryan Travis kick), 2:14. Falcons 27–7. Drive: 10 plays, 65 yards, 4:33.
- UTPB – Ben Patterson 75-yard pass from Kanon Gibson (kick blocked), 2:04. Falcons 33–7. Drive: 1 play, 75 yards, 0:10.
- UTPB – Kylin Mathis 5-yard pass from Kanon Gibson (Angel Diaz kick), 0:27. Falcons 40–7. Drive: 6 plays, 58 yards, 0:53.

Third quarter

- ENMU – Jonathon Carter 15-yard run (kick blocked), 12:00. Falcons 40–13. Drive: 4 plays, 51 yards, 1:29.
- ENMU – Demarion Finch 1-yard run (Ryan Travis kick), 3:25. Falcons 40–20. Drive: 12 plays, 64 yards, 6:05.

Fourth quarter

- UTPB – Kory Harris 2-yard run (Angel Diaz kick), 14:09. Falcons 47–20. Drive: 11 plays, 75 yards, 4:16.
- ENMU – William Reynolds 1-yard run (Ryan Travis kick), 7:00. Falcons 47–27. Drive: 10 plays, 75 yards, 4:30.
- ENMU – Chad Ragle 2-yard run (Ryan Travis kick), 2:58. Falcons 47–34. Drive: 3 plays, 75 yards, 1:47.

Statistics	ENMU	UTPB
First downs	12	25
Total yards	408	572
Rushing yards	231	228
Passing yards	177	344
Turnovers	3	2
Time of possession	31:21	28:39

Team	Category	Player	Statistics
Eastern New Mexico	Passing	Chad Ragle	7/12, 177 yards, TD, INT
Eastern New Mexico	Rushing	Robert Nora	11 rushes, 165 yards
Eastern New Mexico	Receiving	Gerry Romez	4 receptions, 143 yards
UT Permian Basin	Passing	Kanon Gibson	26/42, 321 yards, 2 TD, 2 INT
UT Permian Basin	Rushing	Kory Harris	12 rushes, 83 yards, 2 TD
UT Permian Basin	Receiving	Ben Patterson	4 receptions, 99 yards, TD

=== Sul Ross ===
Sul Ross Lobos at No. 15 UT Permian Basin Falcons – Game summary

Quarter	1	2	3	4	Total
Lobos	7	3	0	0	10
No. 15 Falcons	16	16	14	28	74

at Astound Broadband Stadium, Midland, Texas

- Date: November 15
- Game time: 7:00 p.m. CST
- Game weather: Sunny
- Game attendance: 2,572
- Referee: John Grieger
- Box score, Recap

Game information
First quarter
- UTPB – T. J. McKenzie 4-yard pass from Kanon Gibson (Cash Walker run), 7:52. Falcons 8–0. Drive: 12 plays, 62 yards, 3:27.
- SRS – Taribbean Ramirez 41-yard pass from Kye Callicoatte (Vicente Gariveay kick), 4:58. Falcons 8–7. Drive: 7 plays, 79 yards, 2:39.
- UTPB – Jaylon Tillman 8-yard pass from Kanon Gibson (Caleb Sedegan run), 2:30. Falcons 16–7. Drive: 8 plays, 70 yards, 2:23.

Second quarter

- UTPB – Kylin Mathis 30-yard pass from Kanon Gibson (run failed), 7:41. Falcons 22–7. Drive: 5 plays, 70 yards, 2:14.
- UTPB – Tristan Exline 1-yard run (Angel Diaz kick), 6:50. Falcons 29–7. Drive: 2 plays, 5 yards, 0:40.
- UTPB – Angel Diaz 50-yard field goal, 4:08. Falcons 32–7. Drive: 6 plays, 20 yards, 1:43.
- SRS – Vicente Gariveay 30-yard field goal, 2:13. Falcons 32–10. Drive: 7 plays, 52 yards, 1:55.

Third quarter

- UTPB – Traylen Suel 16-yard pass from Kanon Gibson (Angel Diaz kick), 12:33. Falcons 39–10. Drive: 9 plays, 69 yards, 2:20.
- UTPB – Jaylon Tillman 18-yard pass from Kanon Gibson (Angel Diaz kick), 7:00. Falcons 46–10. Drive: 10 plays, 57 yards, 2:40.

Fourth quarter

- UTPB – Kory Harris 4-yard run (Angel Diaz kick), 13:50. Falcons 53–10. Drive: 11 plays, 87 yards, 5:40.
- UTPB – Crimson Mathis 47-yard pass from Issac Mooring (Angel Diaz kick), 4:53. Falcons 60–10. Drive: 7 plays, 86 yards, 2:23.
- UTPB – Damien Johnson 20-yard run (Angel Diaz kick), 1:50. Falcons 67–10. Drive: 5 plays, 47 yards, 1:30.
- UTPB – Anthony Dansby 1-yard run (Angel Diaz kick), 1:03. Falcons 74–10. Drive: 2 plays, 23 yards, 0:12.

Statistics	SRS	UTPB
First downs	20	34
Total yards	342	639
Rushing yards	106	220
Passing yards	236	419
Turnovers	2	1
Time of possession	30:11	29:49

Team	Category	Player	Statistics
Sul Ross	Passing	Kye Callicoatte	12/30, 189 yards, TD
Sul Ross	Rushing	Jose Trevino	10 rushes, 67 yards
Sul Ross	Receiving	Yamil Oaxaca	5 receptions, 134 yards
UT Permian Basin	Passing	Kanon Gibson	26/50, 296 yards, 5 TD, INT
UT Permian Basin	Rushing	Kory Harris	19 rushes, 74 yards, TD
UT Permian Basin	Receiving	T. J. McKenzie	4 receptions, 69 yards, TD

=== At No. 4 CSU Pueblo (NCAA Division II First Round) ===
2025 NCAA Division II Playoffs First Round
No. 10 UT Permian Basin Falcons at No. 4 CSU Pueblo ThunderWolves – Game summary

Quarter	1	2	3	4	Total
No. 10 Falcons	17	6	7	7	37
No. 4 ThunderWolves	0	3	7	14	24

at ThunderBowl, Pueblo, Colorado

- Date: November 22
- Game time: 2:00 p.m. CST/1:00 p.m. MST
- Game weather: Sunny, 60 °F (16 °C)
- Game attendance: 2,372
- Referee: Michael Gervais
- Box score

Game information
First quarter
- UTPB – Angel Diaz 28-yard field goal, 10:21. Falcons 3–0. Drive: 9 plays, 77 yards, 4:28.
- UTPB – Traylen Suel 9-yard pass from Kanon Gibson (Angel Diaz kick), 5:17. Falcons 10–0. Drive: 8 plays, 80 yards, 3:03.
- UTPB – Traylen Suel 17-yard pass from Kanon Gibson (Angel Diaz kick), 0:35. Falcons 17–0. Drive: 11 plays, 68 yards, 3:59.

Second quarter

- CSP – Jackson Smith 35-yard field goal, 11:12. Falcons 17–3. Drive: 13 plays, 68 yards, 4:17.
- UTPB – Kanon Gibson 2-yard run (kick blocked), 2:20. Falcons 23–3. Drive: 12 plays, 71 yards, 6:31.

Third quarter

- UTPB – Jaylon Tillman 28-yard pass from Kanon Gibson (Angel Diaz kick), 8:29. Falcons 30–3. Drive: 6 plays, 77 yards, 2:32.
- CSP – Kiahn Martinez 4-yard run (Jackson Smith kick), 3:38. Falcons 30–10. Drive: 8 plays, 55 yards, 2:25.

Fourth quarter

- CSP – Reggie Retzlaff 2-yard pass from Roman Fuller (Jackson Smith kick), 9:13. Falcons 30–17. Drive: 13 plays, 93 yards, 4:14.
- UTPB – Kanon Gibson 2-yard run (Angel Diaz kick), 4:18. Falcons 37–17. Drive: 5 plays, 13 yards, 2:57.
- CSP – Dedrek Taylor-Akins 32-yard pass from Roman Fuller (Jackson Smith kick), 2:45. Falcons 37–24. Drive: 10 plays, 58 yards, 1:27.

Statistics	UTPB	CSP
First downs	29	21
Total yards	469	330
Rushing yards	126	80
Passing yards	343	250
Turnovers	0	1
Time of possession	36:35	23:25

Team	Category	Player	Statistics
UT Permian Basin	Passing	Kanon Gibson	24/34, 343 yards, 3 TD
UT Permian Basin	Rushing	Kanon Gibson	22 rushes, 51 yards, 2 TD
UT Permian Basin	Receiving	Traylen Suel	9 receptions, 153 yards, 2 TD
CSU Pueblo	Passing	Roman Fuller	21/47, 250 yards, 2 TD
CSU Pueblo	Rushing	Kiahn Martinez	16 rushes, 51 yards, TD
CSU Pueblo	Receiving	Dedrek Taylor-Atkins	6 receptions, 98 yards, TD

=== At No. 15 Western Colorado (NCAA Division II Second Round) ===
2025 NCAA Division II Playoffs Second Round
No. 10 UT Permian Basin Falcons at No. 15 Western Colorado Mountaineers – Game summary

Quarter	1	2	3	4	OT	Total
No. 10 Falcons	0	0	0	15	6	21
No. 15 Mountaineers	5	7	0	3	0	15

at Mountaineer Bowl, Gunnison, Colorado

- Date: November 29
- Game time: 2:00 p.m. CST/1:00 p.m. MST
- Game weather: Sunny, 41 °F (5 °C)
- Game attendance: 1,783
- Referee: Chris Glass
- Box score, Recap

Game information
First quarter
- WCU – Kory Harris tackled in own end zone, 7:43. Mountaineers 2–0.
- WCU – Adam Tasei 43-yard field goal, 5:46. Mountaineers 5–0. Drive: 4 plays, -1 yard, 1:44.

Second quarter

- WCU – D. J. Allen Jr. 17-yard pass from Drew Nash (Adam Tasei kick), 8:13. Mountaineers 12–0. Drive: 10 plays, 92 yards, 5:14.

Fourth quarter

- WCU – Adam Tasei 31-yard field goal, 12:52. Mountaineers 15–0. Drive: 5 plays, 1 yard, 1:51.
- UTPB – Traylen Suel 6-yard pass from Kanon Gibson (Kanon Gibson pass to Kylin Mathis), 7:54. Mountaineers 15–8. Drive: 13 plays, 75 yards, 4:58.
- UTPB – Kanon Gibson 13-yard run (Angel Diaz kick), 6:57. Tied 15–15. Drive: 3 plays, 29 yards, 0:52.

Overtime

- UTPB – Jaylon Tillman 21-yard pass from Kanon Gibson (kick blocked). Falcons 21–15. Drive: 2 plays, 25 yards.

Statistics	UTPB	WCU
First downs	28	13
Total yards	471	219
Rushing yards	117	114
Passing yards	354	105
Turnovers	2	2
Time of possession	30:56	29:04

Team	Category	Player	Statistics
UT Permian Basin	Passing	Kanon Gibson	38/51, 354 yards, 2 TD, INT
UT Permian Basin	Rushing	Kanon Gibson	20 rushes, 71 yards, TD
UT Permian Basin	Receiving	Jace Wyatt	13 receptions, 99 yards
Western Colorado	Passing	Drew Nash	11/26, 105 yards, TD, INT
Western Colorado	Rushing	Drew Nash	13 rushes, 51 yards
Western Colorado	Receiving	Caden Measner	2 receptions, 29 yards

=== At No. 2 Harding (NCAA Division II Quarterfinal) ===
2025 NCAA Division II Playoffs Quarterfinal
No. 10 UT Permian Basin Falcons at No. 2 Harding Bisons – Game summary

Quarter	1	2	3	4	Total
No. 10 Falcons	7	14	7	0	28
No. 2 Bisons	14	17	3	0	34

at First Security Stadium, Searcy, Arkansas

- Date: December 6
- Game time: 1:00 p.m. CST
- Game weather: Cloudy, 45 °F (7 °C)
- Game attendance: 2,775
- Referee: Jaime Martinez
- Box score, Recap

Game information
First quarter
- HAR – Braden Jay 55-yard run (Magnus Lepak kick), 10:47. Bisons 7–0. Drive: 5 plays, 71 yards, 2:52.
- HAR – Braden Jay 6-yard run (Magnus Lepak kick), 5:18. Bisons 14–0. Drive: 10 plays, 54 yards, 5:29.
- UTPB – Kanon Gibson 1-yard run (Diego Chavarria kick), 0:08. Bisons 14–7. Drive: 13 plays, 75 yards, 5:10.

Second quarter

- HAR – Cole Keylon 50-yard run (Magnus Lepak kick), 13:23. Bisons 21–7. Drive: 4 plays, 65 yards, 1:40.
- UTPB – Camden Tyler 1-yard (Diego Chavarria kick), 10:08. Bisons 21–14. Drive: 7 plays, 34 yards, 3:10.
- UTPB – Jace Wyatt 45-yard pass from Kanon Gibson (Diego Chavarria kick), 6:56. Tied 21–21. Drive: 3 plays, 80 yards, 1:10.
- HAR – Brady Barnett 24-yard run (Magnus Lepak kick), 1:44. Bisons 28–21. Drive: 10 plays, 80 yards, 5:08.
- HAR – Magnus Lepak 47-yard field goal, 0:07. Bisons 31–21. Drive: 8 plays, 21 yards, 1:20.

Third quarter

- HAR – Magnus Lepak 23-yard field goal, 8:29. Bisons 34–21. Drive: 7 plays, 15 yards, 3:34.
- UTPB – Kanon Gibson 1-yard run (Diego Chavarria kick), 3:34. Bisons 34–28. Drive: 12 plays, 75 yards, 4:55.

Fourth quarter

- No scoring plays

Statistics	UTPB	HAR
First downs	24	20
Total yards	364	396
Rushing yards	52	389
Passing yards	312	7
Turnovers	2	0
Time of possession	24:13	35:47

Team	Category	Player	Statistics
UT Permian Basin	Passing	Kanon Gibson	30/41, 321 yards, TD, 2 INT
UT Permian Basin	Rushing	Kanon Gibson	13 rushes, 38 yards, 2 TD
UT Permian Basin	Receiving	Jace Wyatt	4 receptions, 85 yards, TD
Harding	Passing	Cole Keylon	1/3, 7 yards
Harding	Rushing	Cole Keylon	17 rushes, 148 yards, TD
Harding	Receiving	Brady Barnett	1 reception, 7 yards
