= 2026 UT Permian Basin Falcons football team =

American college football season

2026 UT Permian Basin Falcons football
- Conference: Lone Star Conference
- Record: 6–5 (5–4 LSC)
- Head coach: Chris Softley (1st season)
- Offensive coordinator: Elliott Wratten (1st season)
- Offensive scheme: Spread
- Defensive coordinator: Josh Bookbinder (1st season)
- Base defense: 3–3–5 or 4–2–5
- Home stadium: Astound Broadband Stadium

2026 Lone Star Conference football standings
| | Conf. | | | Overall |
| Team | W | | L | W | | L |
|---|---|---|---|---|---|---|
| No. 7 Central Washington $^ | 9 | – | 0 | 9 | – | 2 |
| No. 16 Midwestern State ^ | 8 | – | 1 | 9 | – | 2 |
| Texas A&M–Kingsville | 6 | – | 3 | 6 | – | 5 |
| Western Oregon | 5 | – | 4 | 7 | – | 4 |
| UT Permian Basin | 5 | – | 4 | 6 | – | 5 |
| Angelo State | 5 | – | 4 | 5 | – | 6 |
| West Texas A&M | 4 | – | 5 | 4 | – | 7 |
| Western New Mexico | 2 | – | 7 | 3 | – | 8 |
| Sul Ross | 1 | – | 8 | 2 | – | 9 |
| Eastern New Mexico | 0 | – | 9 | 0 | – | 11 |
$ – Conference champion; ^ – NCAA Division II playoff participant; As of November 18, 2026; Rankings from AFCA poll

The 2026 UT Permian Basin Falcons football team represented the University of Texas Permian Basin (UTPB) in the 2026 NCAA Division II football season as a member of the Lone Star Conference (LSC). The team played all of its home games at Astound Broadband Stadium in Midland, Texas, marking the first time since the 2020 season that Ratliff Stadium in neighboring Odessa did not host a home game. The Falcons were led by first-year head coach Chris Softley.

== Offseason ==
=== Coaching changes ===
On December 23, 2025, Kris McCullough announced that he would be stepping down as the Falcons' head coach to take the same position at Gardner–Webb. On December 31, Lubbock Christian School head coach Chris Softley was hired as the Falcons' new head coach. On January 9, Softley named TCU assistant linebackers coach Josh Bookbinder as the Falcons' new defensive coordinator. VMI offensive line coach / run game coordinator Elliott Wratten was named the team's new offensive coordinator.

== LSC media poll ==
The Lone Star Conference released its preseason prediction poll on July 23, 2026. The Falcons were predicted to finish 5th, but also received 2 first-place votes.

== Schedule ==
| Date | Time | Opponent | Rank | Site | Result | Attendance |
|---|---|---|---|---|---|---|
| August 29 | 7:00 p.m. | at UT Rio Grande Valley* | No. 18 | Robert and Janet Vackar Stadium; Edinburg, TX | L 0–44 | 13,498 |
| September 12 | 6:00 p.m. | Western New Mexico | | Astound Broadband Stadium; Midland, TX | W 69–14 | 1,100 |
| September 19 | 7:00 p.m. | at Sul Ross | | Jackson Field; Alpine, TX | W 66–7 | 250 |
| September 26 | 3:00 p.m. | at Eastern New Mexico | | Steve Loy Family Foundation Stadium; Portales, NM | W 56–10 | N/A |
| October 3 | 5:00 p.m. | at No. 21т Northeastern State* | | Doc Wadley Stadium; Tahlequah, OK | W 38–27 | 5,879 |
| October 10 | 7:00 p.m. | at West Texas A&M | No. 23 | Bain–Schaeffer Buffalo Stadium; Canyon, TX | W 24–17 | 4,112 |
| October 17 | 6:00 p.m. | Western Oregon | No. 20 | Astound Broadband Stadium; Midland, TX | L 19–38 | 2,312 |
| October 24 | 8:00 p.m. | at No. 13 Central Washington | | Tomlinson Stadium; Ellensburg, WA | L 13–42 | 5,947 |
| October 31 | 6:00 p.m. | Angelo State^{†} | | Astound Broadband Stadium; Midland, TX | W 20–10 | 2,138 |
| November 7 | 1:00 p.m. | at No. 24 Midwestern State | | Memorial Stadium; Wichita Falls, TX | L 34–49 | 2,213 |
| November 14 | 2:00 p.m. | Texas A&M–Kingsville | | Astound Broadband Stadium; Midland, TX | L 24–30 ^{OT} | 1,563 |
*Non-conference game; ^{†}Homecoming; Rankings from AFCA Poll released prior to the game; All times are in Central time

== Rankings ==
Ranking movements Legend: ██ Increase in ranking ██ Decrease in ranking — = Not ranked RV = Received votes
| | Week | | | | | | | | | | | | | |
| Poll | Pre | 1 | 2 | 3 | 4 | 5 | 6 | 7 | 8 | 9 | 10 | 11 | 12 | Final |
|---|---|---|---|---|---|---|---|---|---|---|---|---|---|---|
| AFCA | 18 | RV | RV | RV | RV | 23 | 20 | RV | RV | — | — | — | — | |
| D2 Football | 18 | — | — | — | — | 23 | 19 | — | — | — | — | — | — | |

== Personnel ==
2026 UT Permian Basin Falcons football team roster
Players
Coaches
Offense

| Pos. | # | Name | Class |
|---|---|---|---|
| RB | 0 | Camden Tyler | GS |
| WR | 1 | George Sims | GS |
| WR | 2 | Traylen Suel | GS |
| WR | 3 | Tre Brown | Jr |
| WR | 4 | Malachi Wright | Jr |
| QB | 5 | Braxton Baker | Jr |
| QB | 6 | Nate TenBarge | Jr |
| QB | 7 | Solomon James | GS |
| WR | 8 | Isaiah Brevard | Jr |
| WR | 8 | Diego Nunez | Sr |
| QB | 10 | Aaron DeLeon | Fr |
| WR | 13 | Trey Spann | Jr |
| QB | 14 | Legend Howell | Fr |
| QB | 15 | Edwin Merriweather | So |
| RB | 17 | Cheno Navarrette | So |
| WR | 18 | Adrian Corley | Fr |
| RB | 22 | Dai Dai Atkins | Fr |
| WR | 24 | Deonta Sonnier | Jr |
| RB | 25 | Khalil Eichelberger | Sr |
| RB | 27 | Eric Mosley | Fr |
| RB | 30 | Micai Thompson | Fr |
| RB | 31 | Stone Ratliff | Fr |
| RB | 32 | Colton Hill | Fr |
| WR | 33 | Kohen Peeler | Fr |
| RB | 34 | Randle Parker | So |
| TE | 40 | Kayden Baze | Jr |
| TE | 43 | Ryder Ribitzki | Fr |
| WR | 47 | Logan McCormick | Fr |
| TE | 48 | Andrew Nisius | Fr |
| OL | 50 | Michael Latin | Jr |
| OL | 52 | Willie Pridgen | So |
| OL | 54 | Jaden Edmonson | GS |
| OL | 56 | David Baker | So |
| OL | 58 | Deivi Martinez | Jr |
| OL | 61 | Evis Bobey | Fr |
| OL | 62 | Diego Jaurez | So |
| OL | 64 | Chase Alexander | Fr |
| OL | 65 | Christian Smith | Jr |
| OL | 66 | Girevis Bobey | Jr |
| OL | 67 | Sam Fishman | Fr |
| OL | 68 | Paulo Camacho | Fr |
| OL | 70 | Mason Schweinle | Sr |
| OL | 71 | Jordan McClaine | Sr |
| OL | 72 | Xavier Jones | Fr |
| OL | 73 | Patrick Ramirez | Fr |
| OL | 74 | Damien Thomas | Sr |
| OL | 75 | Torbyn Eakins | Sr |
| OL | 77 | Caleb Morman | Fr |
| OL | 78 | Zyan Herndon | So |
| OL | 79 | Braylon Stewart | Jr |
| WR | 80 | Aiden Serrano | So |
| WR | 81 | Gavin Brown | Fr |
| WR | 82 | Jalen Warren | Fr |
| WR | 83 | Heston Kelly | Jr |
| WR | 84 | Keaton Lee | Fr |
| TE | 85 | Major Tucker | Fr |
| WR | 86 | Anthony Banks | Fr |
| TE | 87 | Caleb Sedegan | Sr |
| TE | 88 | J. T. Seagraves | GS |
| WR | 89 | Kristian Nobles | Fr |

Defense

| Pos. | # | Name | Class |
|---|---|---|---|
| DB | 1 | Nicholas Butler | So |
| DB | 2 | Jaden Welch | Jr |
| DB | 3 | Jaiden Fike | Fr |
| DL, LB | 4 | Nicholas Elko | Fr |
| DL, LB | 5 | Johnny Fano | Jr |
| DB | 6 | Raymond Valencia | Jr |
| LB | 7 | Eli Leiataua | Jr |
| DL | 8 | Godgive Ugochukwu | Jr |
| DB | 9 | Kendrick Jones | Sr |
| DL | 11 | Tylinn Lewis | Jr |
| DB | 12 | Jaylin Broadus | Jr |
| DB | 16 | Leonard Adams | Jr |
| DB | 19 | Samuel Olokeogun | Sr |
| DB | 20 | Layne Horak | Sr |
| DB | 21 | Dreshon Douglas | So |
| DB | 22 | Dom Lopez | Jr |
| LB | 23 | Devin Green | So |
| DB | 24 | Jayden Plater | Jr |
| DB | 25 | John Peoples | Fr |
| DB | 26 | Elijah Robinson | Jr |
| DB | 27 | David Vah | So |
| LB | 28 | Tom Watts | So |
| DB | 29 | Miles Thompson | Jr |
| DB | 30 | Willie Crain | Fr |
| DB | 31 | Elliott Grigsby | Sr |
| DB | 32 | Jeremiah Green | Fr |
| DB | 33 | Messiah Boulieu | Fr |
| DB | 34 | Naiem Powell | So |
| DB | 35 | Dwayne Wingfield | Fr |
| DB | 36 | Jordan Loney | Fr |
| DB | 37 | Damien Johnson | So |
| DB | 38 | Rene Holguin | Sr |
| DB | 39 | Canden Mathis | Fr |
| LB | 41 | Mason Van Sickle | Fr |
| DL, LB | 42 | Warren Richardson | So |
| LB | 44 | Gordon Mohetau | Fr |
| LB | 45 | McKyle So'oto | Sr |
| LB | 46 | Joseuberto Bondoni-Guzman | Fr |
| DL, LB | 47 | Palamveer Dhaliwal | Jr |
| DL | 51 | Malotumau Fano | Jr |
| DL | 53 | Isaiah Mathews | Fr |
| DL | 55 | Joey Lealao | Jr |
| DL, LB | 57 | Zamir Richardson | Jr |
| DL | 58 | Isiah Tolefree | Fr |
| DL | 76 | Jack Freeman | Fr |
| DL | 90 | Leighton Henderson | Fr |
| DL | 91 | Jarred Washington | Fr |
| DL | 92 | Tymer Askew | Fr |
| DL | 93 | Prince Holiday | Fr |
| LB | 94 | Matthew Lambert | GS |
| DL | 95 | Ephraim Whitaker | Fr |
| DL | 96 | Ah'Zairee Piggee | Jr |
| DL | 97 | Clive Wahl | Fr |
| DL | 98 | Dieunerst Collin | Sr |
| DL | 99 | Calvin Wilkins | Fr |

Special teams

| Pos. | # | Name | Class |
|---|---|---|---|
| LS | 43 | Ryder Ribitzki | Fr |
| LS | 49 | Trace Emola | So |
| K | 53 | Christian Bush | Fr |
| LS | 55 | Zane Vela | Fr |
| K | 59 | Cub Sutton | Fr |
| P | 60 | Matthew Sebade | Sr |
| P | 64 | Carter Stebbins | Fr |
| K | 69 | Diego Chavarria | Jr |

Head coach

- Chris Softley

Coordinators/assistant coaches

- Elliott Wratten
  Offensive coordinator/offensive line
- Josh Bookbinder
  Defensive coordinator/linebackers
- Gavin Lutman
  Passing game coordinator/wide receivers
- Zeke Lott
  Tight ends
- Jeremiah Taylor
  Running backs
- John Cisneros
  Assistant offensive line
- Jordan Iosefa
  Defensive line
- Hayden Kelly
  Outside linebackers
- Donzale Ashley
  Cornerbacks
- Ryan Conray
  Special teams coordinator/safeties

Legend

- (C) Team captain
- (S) Suspended
- (I) Ineligible
- Injured
- Redshirt

Roster
Last update: August 29, 2026

== Game summaries ==
=== At UT Rio Grande Valley (FCS) ===
No. 18 UT Permian Basin Falcons at UT Rio Grande Valley Vaqueros (FCS) – Game summary

| Quarter | 1 | 2 | 3 | 4 | Total |
|---|---|---|---|---|---|
| No. 18 Falcons | 0 | 0 | 0 | 0 | 0 |
| Vaqueros (FCS) | 17 | 6 | 7 | 14 | 44 |

at Robert and Janet Vackar Stadium, Edinburg, Texas

- Date: August 29
- Game time: 7:00 p.m. CDT
- Game weather: Sunny, 93 °F (34 °C)
- Game attendance: 13,498
- Referee: Matt Beck
- TV announcers (ESPN+): Mark May, Aaron Saenz, and Jaeda Rael
- Box score, Recap

Game information
First quarter
- RGV – Kyran Lee 15-yard pass from Aidan Jakobsohn (Brysen Gardner kick), 12:48. Vaqueros 7–0. Drive: 5 plays, 72 yards, 2:07.
- RGV – Brysen Gardner 28-yard field goal, 6:46. Vaqueros 10–0. Drive: 10 plays, 37 yards, 4:48.
- RGV – Tavian Cord 29-yard pass from Garret Rangel (Brysen Gardner kick), 2:10. Vaqueros 17–0. Drive: 4 plays, 92 yards, 1:40.

Second quarter

- RGV – Brysen Gardner 25-yard field goal, 11:42. Vaqueros 20–0. Drive: 10 plays, 75 yards, 4:17.
- RGV – Brysen Gardner 36-yard field goal, 0:00. Vaqueros 23–0. Drive: 8 plays, 48 yards, 2:02.

Third quarter

- RGV – Garret Rangel 2-yard run (Brysen Gardner kick), 8:32. Vaqueros 30–0. Drive: 11 plays, 64 yards, 4:47.

Fourth quarter

- RGV – Malachi Lane 6-yard run (Brysen Gardner kick), 14:48. Vaqueros 37–0. Drive: 11 plays, 80 yards, 5:05.
- RGV – Brennan Carroll 38-yard run (Troop O'Neal kick), 11:37. Vaqueros 44–0. Drive: 4 plays, 68 yards, 2:00.

| Statistics | UTPB | RGV |
|---|---|---|
| First downs | 9 | 29 |
| Total yards | 165 | 675 |
| Rushing yards | 13 | 271 |
| Passing yards | 152 | 404 |
| Turnovers | 3 | 2 |
| Time of possession | 21:17 | 38:43 |

| Team | Category | Player | Statistics |
|---|---|---|---|
| UT Permian Basin | Passing | Nate TenBarge | 14/34, 151 yards, 2 INT |
| UT Permian Basin | Rushing | Cheno Navarrette | 3 rushes, 11 yards |
| UT Permian Basin | Receiving | Traylen Suel | 5 receptions, 63 yards |
| UT Rio Grande Valley | Passing | Garret Rangel | 12/15, 211 yards, TD |
| UT Rio Grande Valley | Rushing | Brennan Carroll | 9 rushes, 84 yards, TD |
| UT Rio Grande Valley | Receiving | Kyran Lee | 6 receptions, 141 yards, TD |

=== Western New Mexico ===
Western New Mexico Mustangs at UT Permian Basin Falcons – Game summary

| Quarter | 1 | 2 | 3 | 4 | Total |
|---|---|---|---|---|---|
| Mustangs | 0 | 7 | 7 | 0 | 14 |
| Falcons | 27 | 14 | 28 | 0 | 69 |

at Astound Broadband Stadium, Midland, Texas

- Date: September 12
- Game time: 6:00 p.m. CDT
- Game weather: Sunny
- Game attendance: 1,100
- Referee: Jon Sasse
- Box score, Recap

Game information
First quarter
- UTPB – Diego Chavarria 22-yard field goal, 9:03. Falcons 3–0. Drive: 10 plays, 76 yards, 3:37.
- UTPB – J. T. Seagraves 5-yard pass from Nate TenBarge (Diego Chavarria kick), 7:13. Falcons 10–0. Drive: 2 plays, 5 yards, 0:33.
- UTPB – J. T. Seagraves 67-yard pass from Nate TenBarge (Diego Chavarria kick), 4:40. Falcons 17–0. Drive: 2 plays, 67 yards, 0:16.
- UTPB – Diego Chavarria 42-yard field goal, 2:02. Falcons 20–0. Drive: 5 plays, 1 yard, 1:38.
- UTPB – Cheno Navarrette 45-yard run (Diego Chavarria kick), 0:02. Falcons 27–0. Drive: 3 plays, 64 yards, 0:32.

Second quarter

- UTPB – Traylen Suel 25-yard pass from Nate TenBarge (Diego Chavarria kick), 14:24. Falcons 34–0. Drive: 3 plays, 28 yards, 0:36.
- WNM – Demarion Postell 23-yard pass from Jase Ashley (Nathan Flores kick), 8:48. Falcons 34–7. Drive: 4 plays, 39 yards, 1:11.
- UTPB – Layne Horack 28-yard interception return (Diego Chavarria kick), 1:30. Falcons 41–7.

Third quarter

- UTPB – Khalil Eichelberger 28-yard run (Diego Chavarria kick), 11:19. Falcons 48–7. Drive: 9 plays, 75 yards, 3:41.
- UTPB – Tyler Camden 6-yard run (Diego Chavarria kick), 10:11. Falcons 55–7. Drive: 4 plays, 18 yards, 0:59.
- WNM – Clayton Zentner 40-yard fumble return (Nathan Flores kick), 8:25. Falcons 55–14.
- UTPB – Micai Thompson 14-yard run (Diego Chavarria kick), 6:36. Falcons 62–14. Drive: 5 plays, 75 yards, 1:49.
- UTPB – Adrian Corley 13-yard pass from Solomon James (Diego Chavarria kick), 2:44. Falcons 69–14. Drive: 3 plays, 27 yards, 1:33.

| Statistics | WNM | UTPB |
|---|---|---|
| First downs | 11 | 25 |
| Total yards | 176 | 554 |
| Rushing yards | 55 | 330 |
| Passing yards | 121 | 224 |
| Turnovers | 5 | 2 |
| Time of possession | 30:22 | 29:38 |

| Team | Category | Player | Statistics |
|---|---|---|---|
| Western New Mexico | Passing | Jase Ashley | 11/21, 99 yards, TD, 2 INT |
| Western New Mexico | Rushing | Joshua Gaines | 18 rushes, 23 yards |
| Western New Mexico | Receiving | Jaylen Rushing | 2 receptions, 32 yards |
| UT Permian Basin | Passing | Nate TenBarge | 7/16, 143 yards, 3 TD |
| UT Permian Basin | Rushing | Cheno Navarrette | 6 rushes, 68 yards, TD |
| UT Permian Basin | Receiving | J. T. Seagraves | 3 receptions, 72 yards, 2 TD |

=== At Sul Ross ===
UT Permian Basin Falcons at Sul Ross Lobos – Game summary

| Quarter | 1 | 2 | 3 | 4 | Total |
|---|---|---|---|---|---|
| Falcons | 31 | 14 | 14 | 7 | 66 |
| Lobos | 0 | 0 | 0 | 7 | 7 |

at Jackson Field, Alpine, Texas

- Date: September 19
- Game time: 7:00 p.m. CDT
- Game weather: Sunny
- Game attendance: 250
- Referee: Neil Dilts
- Box score, Recap

Game information
First quarter
- UTPB – Camden Tyler 24-yard run (Diego Chavarria kick), 12:43. Falcons 7–0. Drive: 4 plays, 50 yards, 1:00.
- UTPB – Diego Chavarria 38-yard field goal, 6:55. Falcons 10–0. Drive: 7 plays, 19 yards, 1:47.
- UTPB – Caleb Sedegan 14-yard pass from Nate TenBarge (Diego Chavarria kick), 4:13. Falcons 17–0. Drive: 6 plays, 64 yards, 1:34.
- UTPB – Layne Horak 40-yard interception return (Diego Chavarria kick), 2:05. Falcons 24–0.
- UTPB – Eli Leiataua 21-yard interception return (Diego Chavarria kick), 1:15. Falcons 31–0.

Second quarter

- UTPB – Aiden Serrano 17-yard pass from Nate TenBarge (Diego Chavarria kick), 11:22. Falcons 38–0. Drive: 5 plays, 52 yards, 2:01.
- UTPB – Traylen Suel 36-yard pass from Nate TenBarge (Diego Chavarria kick), 2:34. Falcons 45–0. Drive: 10 plays, 86 yards, 3:07.

Third quarter

- UTPB – Micai Thompson 98-yard kickoff return (Diego Chavarria kick), 14:49. Falcons 52–0.
- UTPB – Solomon James 3-yard run (Diego Chavarria kick), 2:45. Falcons 59–0. Drive: 11 plays, 70 yards, 5:04.

Fourth quarter

- UTPB – Camden Tyler 21-yard run (Diego Chavarria kick), 9:01. Falcons 66–0. Drive: 9 plays, 64 yards, 5:15.
- SRS – Vince Arcuri 6-yard run (Jason Maltos kick), 2:07. Falcons 66–7. Drive: 5 plays, 30 yards, 1:08.

| Statistics | UTPB | SRS |
|---|---|---|
| First downs | 26 | 23 |
| Total yards | 395 | 303 |
| Rushing yards | 144 | 143 |
| Passing yards | 251 | 160 |
| Turnovers | 1 | 4 |
| Time of possession | 26:34 | 33:26 |

| Team | Category | Player | Statistics |
|---|---|---|---|
| UT Permian Basin | Passing | Nate TenBarge | 14/27, 215 yards, 3 TD |
| UT Permian Basin | Rushing | Camden Tyler | 12 rushes, 93 yards, 2 TD |
| UT Permian Basin | Receiving | Traylen Suel | 2 receptions, 56 yards, TD |
| Sul Ross | Passing | Will Howell | 13/32, 135 yards, 3 INT |
| Sul Ross | Rushing | Will Howell | 14 rushes, 65 yards |
| Sul Ross | Receiving | Ronald Bell | 4 receptions, 81 yards |

=== At Eastern New Mexico ===
UT Permian Basin Falcons at Eastern New Mexico Greyhounds – Game summary

| Quarter | 1 | 2 | 3 | 4 | Total |
|---|---|---|---|---|---|
| Falcons | 14 | 14 | 7 | 21 | 56 |
| Greyhounds | 3 | 0 | 7 | 0 | 10 |

at Steve Loy Family Foundation Stadium, Portales, New Mexico

- Date: September 26
- Game time: 3:00 p.m. CDT / 2:00 p.m. MDT
- Game weather: Sunny, 76 °F (24 °C)
- Referee: Steve Hill
- Box score, Recap

Game information
First quarter
- ENM – Kaden Dow 25-yard field goal, 4:12. Greyhounds 3–0. Drive: 19 plays, 65 yards, 7:08.
- UTPB – Cheno Navarrette 52-yard pass from Nate TenBarge (Diego Chavarria kick), 4:03. Falcons 7–3. Drive: 1 play, 52 yards, 0:09.
- UTPB – Aiden Serrano 4-yard pass from Nate TenBarge (Diego Chavarria kick), 0:51. Falcons 14–3. Drive: 4 plays, 60 yards, 1:01.

Second quarter

- UTPB – Nate TenBarge 3-yard run (Diego Chavarria kick), 8:04. Falcons 21–3. Drive: 7 plays, 89 yards, 3:16.
- UTPB – Traylen Suel 10-yard pass from Nate TenBarge (Diego Chavarria kick), 0:54. Falcons 28–3. Drive: 12 plays, 74 yards, 4:17.

Third quarter

- UTPB – J. T. Seagraves 3-yard pass from Nate TenBarge (Diego Chavarria kick), 5:56. Falcons 35–3. Drive: 9 plays, 80 yards, 4:08.
- ENM – Trei Kibbles 6-yard pass from Jake South (Kaden Dow kick), 0:08. Falcons 35–10. Drive: 9 plays, 80 yards, 5:48.

Fourth quarter

- UTPB – Solomon James 9-yard run (Diego Chavarria kick), 14:50. Falcons 42–10. Drive: 8 plays, 86 yards, 3:34.
- UTPB – Traylen Suel 42-yard pass from Solomon James (Diego Chavarria kick), 12:27. Falcons 49–10. Drive: 3 plays, 54 yards, 1:27.
- UTPB – Solomon James 11-yard run (Diego Chavarria kick), 4:46. Falcons 56–10. Drive: 3 plays, 15 yards, 1:36.

| Statistics | UTPB | ENM |
|---|---|---|
| First downs | 32 | 19 |
| Total yards | 583 | 294 |
| Rushing yards | 281 | 56 |
| Passing yards | 302 | 238 |
| Turnovers | 1 | 3 |
| Time of possession | 41:38 | 18:22 |

| Team | Category | Player | Statistics |
|---|---|---|---|
| UT Permian Basin | Passing | Nate TenBarge | 18/28, 245 yards, 4 TD, INT |
| UT Permian Basin | Rushing | Cheno Navarrette | 7 rushes, 82 yards |
| UT Permian Basin | Receiving | Tarylen Suel | 5 receptions, 95 yards, 2 TD |
| Eastern New Mexico | Passing | Jake South | 17/27, 229 yards, TD, 2 INT |
| Eastern New Mexico | Rushing | Jose Trevino | 10 rushes, 36 yards |
| Eastern New Mexico | Receiving | Trei Kibbles | 3 receptions, 61 yards, TD |

=== At No. 21т Northeastern State ===
UT Permian Basin Falcons at No. 21т Northeastern State RiverHawks – Game summary

| Quarter | 1 | 2 | 3 | 4 | Total |
|---|---|---|---|---|---|
| Falcons | 7 | 10 | 7 | 14 | 38 |
| No. 21т RiverHawks | 7 | 7 | 0 | 13 | 27 |

at Doc Wadley Stadium, Tahlequah, Oklahoma

- Date: October 3
- Game time: 5:00 p.m. CDT
- Game weather: Sunny
- Game attendance: 5,879
- Referee: Phil Lombardi
- Box score

Game information
First quarter
- NESU – Mikail Trotter 1-yard run (Troy Nguyen kick), 4:44. RiverHawks 7–0. Drive: 6 plays, 41 yards, 2:29.
- UTPB – Nate TenBarge 41-yard run (Diego Chavarria kick), 2:27. Tied 7–7. Drive: 4 plays, 75 yards, 2:17.

Second quarter

- NESU – Cam Jackson 48-yard pass from Donnie Smith (Troy Nguyen kick), 13:54. RiverHawks 14–7. Drive: 5 plays, 72 yards, 1:17.
- UTPB – Diego Chavarria 32-yard field goal, 6:47. RiverHawks 14–10. Drive: 12 plays, 61 yards, 7:07.
- UTPB – Malachi Wright 21-yard pass from Nate TenBarge (Diego Chavarria kick), 0:26. Falcons 17–14. Drive: 5 plays, 80 yards, 0:45.

Third quarter

- UTPB – Nicholas Butler 35-yard interception return (Diego Chavarria kick), 3:26. Falcons 24–14.

Fourth quarter

- UTPB – Khalil Eichelberger 1-yard run (Diego Chavarria kick), 7:29. Falcons 31–14. Drive: 8 plays, 25 yards, 5:04.
- NESU – Deuce Roberson 5-yard pass from Donnie Smith (kick failed), 4:21. Falcons 31–20. Drive: 9 plays, 68 yards, 3:01.
- UTPB – Cheno Navarrette 14-yard run (Diego Chavarria kick), 2:37. Falcons 38–20. Drive: 4 plays, 42 yards, 1:43.
- NESU – Deuce Roberson 26-yard pass from Donnie Smith (Troy Nguyen kick), 1:00. Falcons 38–27. Drive: 8 plays, 86 yards, 1:29.

| Statistics | UTPB | NESU |
|---|---|---|
| First downs | 19 | 28 |
| Total yards | 338 | 460 |
| Rushing yards | 114 | 83 |
| Passing yards | 224 | 377 |
| Turnovers | 1 | 5 |
| Time of possession | 28:19 | 31:41 |

| Team | Category | Player | Statistics |
|---|---|---|---|
| UT Permian Basin | Passing | Nate TenBarge | 17/25, 224 yards, TD, INT |
| UT Permian Basin | Rushing | Nate TenBarge | 12 rushes, 52 yards, TD |
| UT Permian Basin | Receiving | Tre Brown | 2 receptions, 60 yards |
| Northeastern State | Passing | Donnie Smith | 31/47, 377 yards, 3 TD, 5 INT |
| Northeastern State | Rushing | Mikail Trotter | 17 rushes, 52 yards, TD |
| Northeastern State | Receiving | Deuce Roberson | 14 receptions, 168 yards, 2 TD |

=== At West Texas A&M ===
No. 23 UT Permian Basin Falcons at West Texas A&M Buffaloes – Game summary

| Quarter | 1 | 2 | 3 | 4 | Total |
|---|---|---|---|---|---|
| No. 23 Falcons | 7 | 7 | 7 | 3 | 24 |
| Buffaloes | 7 | 0 | 3 | 7 | 17 |

at Bain–Schaeffer Buffalo Stadium, Canyon, Texas

- Date: October 10
- Game time: 7:00 p.m. CDT
- Game weather: Sunny, 75 °F (24 °C)
- Game attendance: 4,112
- Referee: John Grieger
- Box score, Recap

Game information
First quarter
- UTPB – Tre Brown 31-yard pass from Nate TenBarge (Carter Stebbins kick), 10:41. Falcons 7–0. Drive: 6 plays, 65 yards, 2:03.
- WTAM – Contae Carson 2-yard run (Alan Ananya kick), 6:29. Tied 7–7. Drive: 10 plays, 75 yards, 4:12.

Second quarter

- UTPB – Nate TenBarge 4-yard run (Diego Chavarria kick), 9:10. Falcons 14–7. Drive: 9 plays, 75 yards, 4:04.

Third quarter

- WTAM – Alan Ananya 28-yard field goal, 10:38. Falcons 14–10. Drive: 9 plays, 67 yards, 3:01.
- UTPB – Khalil Eichelberger 1-yard run (Diego Chavarria kick), 4:58. Falcons 21–10. Drive: 12 plays, 75 yards, 5:40.

Fourth quarter

- WTAM – Joseph White 34-yard pass from Knox Porter (Alan Ananya kick), 14:45. Falcons 21–17. Drive: 6 plays, 50 yards, 1:31.
- UTPB – Diego Chavarria 22-yard field goal, 9:10. Falcons 24–17. Drive: 13 plays, 71 yards, 5:35.

| Statistics | UTPB | WTAM |
|---|---|---|
| First downs | 22 | 21 |
| Total yards | 413 | 378 |
| Rushing yards | 129 | 48 |
| Passing yards | 284 | 330 |
| Turnovers | 2 | 2 |
| Time of possession | 35:30 | 24:30 |

| Team | Category | Player | Statistics |
|---|---|---|---|
| UT Permian Basin | Passing | Nate TenBarge | 17/33, 202 yards, TD, INT |
| UT Permian Basin | Rushing | Micai Thompson | 3 rushes, 38 yards |
| UT Permian Basin | Receiving | Tre Brown | 4 receptions, 72 yards, TD |
| West Texas A&M | Passing | Knox Porter | 26/52, 287 yards, TD, INT |
| West Texas A&M | Rushing | Knox Porter | 12 rushes, 25 yards |
| West Texas A&M | Receiving | J. B. Mitchell III | 6 receptions, 91 yards |

=== Western Oregon ===
Western Oregon Wolves at No. 20 UT Permian Basin Falcons – Game summary

| Quarter | 1 | 2 | 3 | 4 | Total |
|---|---|---|---|---|---|
| Wolves | 10 | 0 | 7 | 21 | 38 |
| No. 20 Falcons | 0 | 13 | 0 | 6 | 19 |

at Astound Broadband Stadium, Midland, Texas

- Date: October 17
- Game time: 6:00 p.m. CDT
- Game weather: Sunny
- Game attendance: 2,312
- Referee: Neil Dilts
- Box score

Game information
First quarter
- WOU – Kadyn Butcher 46-yard field goal, 9:34. Wolves 3–0. Drive: 8 plays, 24 yards, 3:17.
- WOU – Jaylen Fite 8-yard pass from Jordan McCarty (Kadyn Butcher kick), 0:57. Wolves 10–0. Drive: 13 plays, 52 yards, 7:12.

Second quarter

- UTPB – Diego Chavarria 28-yard field goal, 12:08. Wolves 10–3. Drive: 10 plays, 64 yards, 3:49.
- UTPB – George Sims 24-yard pass from Nate TenBarge (Diego Chavarria kick), 8:03. Tied 10–10. Drive: 5 plays, 69 yards, 2:24.
- UTPB – Diego Chavarria 38-yard field goal, 0:49. Falcons 13–10. Drive: 6 plays, 29 yards, 1:53.

Third quarter

- WOU – Jackson Trimmer 72-yard pass from Jordan McCarty (Kadyn Butcher kick), 10:12. Wolves 17–13. Drive: 3 plays, 80 yards, 1:28.

Fourth quarter

- WOU – Jordan McCarty 14-yard run (Kadyn Butcher kick), 14:54. Wolves 24–13. Drive: 4 plays, 28 yards, 1:45.
- WOU – Tyler Konold 1-yard run (Kadyn Butcher kick), 10:54. Wolves 31–13. Drive: 4 plays, 45 yards, 2:11.
- UTPB – Tre Brown 9-yard pass from Braxton Baker (pass failed), 7:45. Wolves 31–19. Drive: 7 plays, 82 yards, 3:01.
- WOU – Carson Workman 79-yard run (Kadyn Butcher kick), 2:50. Wolves 38–19. Drive: 1 play, 74 yards, 0:08.

| Statistics | WOU | UTPB |
|---|---|---|
| First downs | 16 | 22 |
| Total yards | 399 | 341 |
| Rushing yards | 219 | -2 |
| Passing yards | 180 | 343 |
| Turnovers | 2 | 2 |
| Time of possession | 33:30 | 26:30 |

| Team | Category | Player | Statistics |
|---|---|---|---|
| Western Oregon | Passing | Jordan McCarty | 11/19, 180 yards, 2 TD, INT |
| Western Oregon | Rushing | Carson Workman | 10 rushes, 97 yards, TD |
| Western Oregon | Receiving | Jackson Trimmer | 1 reception, 72 yards, TD |
| UT Permian Basin | Passing | Nate TenBarge | 20/35, 218 yards, TD |
| UT Permian Basin | Rushing | Camden Tyler | 3 rushes, 12 yards |
| UT Permian Basin | Receiving | Tre Brown | 5 receptions, 101 yards, TD |

=== At No. 13 Central Washington ===
UT Permian Basin Falcons at No. 13 Central Washington Wildcats – Game summary

| Quarter | 1 | 2 | 3 | 4 | Total |
|---|---|---|---|---|---|
| Falcons | 0 | 6 | 0 | 7 | 13 |
| No. 13 Wildcats | 14 | 7 | 7 | 14 | 42 |

at Tomlinson Stadium, Ellensburg, Washington

- Date: October 24
- Game time: 8:00 p.m. CDT / 6:00 p.m. PDT
- Game weather: Clear, 48 °F (9 °C)
- Game attendance: 5,947
- Referee: Daniel Mena
- Box score, Recap

Game information
First quarter
- CWU – Mason Juergens 15-yard pass from Justin Brennan (David Weber kick), 7:29. Wildcats 7–0. Drive: 10 plays, 70 yards, 4:08.
- CWU – Justin Brennan 1-yard run (David Weber kick), 0:11. Wildcats 14–0. Drive: 11 plays, 58 yards, 5:46.

Second quarter

- CWU – Ryder Bumgarner 13-yard run (David Weber kick), 1:43. Wildcats 21–0. Drive: 7 plays, 44 yards, 2:43.
- UTPB – Traylen Suel 3-yard pass from Braxton Baker (kick failed), 0:05. Wildcats 21–6. Drive: 9 plays, 75 yards, 1:38.

Third quarter

- CWU – Isaac Torres 26-yard pass from Justin Brennan (David Weber kick), 9:35. Wildcats 28–6. Drive: 10 plays, 69 yards, 5:20.

Fourth quarter

- UTPB – J. T. Seagraves 6-yard pass from Braxton Baker (Diego Chavarria kick), 12:10. Wildcats 28–13. Drive: 9 plays, 80 yards, 3:16.
- CWU – Omar Lazcano 75-yard interception return (David Weber kick), 5:40. Wildcats 35–13.
- CWU – Ryder Bumgarner 11-yard run (David Weber kick), 0:15. Wildcats 42–13. Drive: 7 plays, 39 yards, 4:38.

| Statistics | UTPB | CWU |
|---|---|---|
| First downs | 18 | 26 |
| Total yards | 290 | 359 |
| Rushing yards | 114 | 191 |
| Passing yards | 176 | 168 |
| Turnovers | 1 | 1 |
| Time of possession | 23:42 | 36:07 |

| Team | Category | Player | Statistics |
|---|---|---|---|
| UT Permian Basin | Passing | Braxton Baker | 14/25, 168 yards, 2 TD, INT |
| UT Permian Basin | Rushing | Cheno Navarrette | 12 rushes, 63 yards |
| UT Permian Basin | Receiving | Traylen Suel | 4 receptions, 56 yards, TD |
| Central Washington | Passing | Justin Brennan | 17/26, 168 yards, 2 TD, INT |
| Central Washington | Rushing | Ryder Bumgarner | 25 rushes, 113 yards, 2 TD |
| Central Washington | Receiving | Mason Juergens | 7 receptions, 64 yards, TD |

=== Angelo State ===
Angelo State Rams at UT Permian Basin Falcons – Game summary

| Quarter | 1 | 2 | 3 | 4 | Total |
|---|---|---|---|---|---|
| Rams | 0 | 3 | 7 | 0 | 10 |
| Falcons | 7 | 10 | 0 | 3 | 20 |

at Astound Broadband Stadium, Midland, Texas

- Date: October 31
- Game time: 6:00 p.m. CDT
- Game weather: Sunny
- Game attendance: 2,138
- Referee: Esrael Silva
- Box score, Recap

Game information
First quarter
- UTPB – Cheno Navarrette 26-yard pass from Braxton Baker (Diego Chavarria kick), 10:08. Falcons 7–0. Drive: 11 plays, 75 yards, 4:52.

Second quarter

- ASU – Paden Maas 39-yard field goal, 5:47. Falcons 7–3. Drive: 6 plays, 11 yards, 1:30.
- UTPB – Cheno Navarrette 17-yard run (Diego Chavarria kick), 1:55. Falcons 14–3. Drive: 10 plays, 75 yards, 3:52.
- UTPB – Diego Chavarria 34-yard field goal, 0:00. Falcons 17–3. Drive: 5 plays, 24 yards, 1:36.

Third quarter

- ASU – Canon Wiese 52-yard pass from Maddox Maher (Paden Mass kick), 13:04. Falcons 17–10. Drive: 5 plays, 73 yards, 1:52.

Fourth quarter

- UTPB – Diego Chavarria 45-yard field goal, 2:10. Falcons 20–10. Drive: 4 plays, 7 yards, 2:29.

| Statistics | ASU | UTPB |
|---|---|---|
| First downs | 13 | 20 |
| Total yards | 276 | 312 |
| Rushing yards | 75 | 98 |
| Passing yards | 201 | 214 |
| Turnovers | 2 | 2 |
| Time of possession | 24:26 | 35:34 |

| Team | Category | Player | Statistics |
|---|---|---|---|
| Angelo State | Passing | Maddox Maher | 20/32, 201 yards, TD, INT |
| Angelo State | Rushing | Canon Wiese | 10 rushes, 33 yards |
| Angelo State | Receiving | Donny Bishop | 8 receptions, 71 yards |
| UT Permian Basin | Passing | Braxton Baker | 22/39, 214 yards, TD, 2 INT |
| UT Permian Basin | Rushing | Cheno Navarrette | 12 rushes, 73 yards, TD |
| UT Permian Basin | Receiving | Cheno Navarrette | 6 receptions, 66 yards, TD |

=== At No. 24 Midwestern State ===
UT Permian Basin Falcons at No. 24 Midwestern State Mustangs – Game summary

| Quarter | 1 | 2 | 3 | 4 | Total |
|---|---|---|---|---|---|
| Falcons | 7 | 6 | 7 | 14 | 34 |
| No. 24 Mustangs | 7 | 7 | 28 | 7 | 49 |

at Memorial Stadium, Wichita Falls, Texas

- Date: November 7
- Game time: 1:00 p.m. CST
- Game weather: Sunny, 59 °F (15 °C)
- Game attendance: 2,213
- Referee: James Collins
- Box score, Recap

Game information
First quarter
- UTPB – Nicholas Elko 30-yard interception return (Diego Chavarria kick), 13:03. Falcons 7–0.
- MSU – Ace Traylor 5-yard pass from Kaden Brown (Kohen Maroney kick), 8:19. Tied 7–7. Drive: 14 plays, 75 yards, 4:44.

Second quarter

- UTPB – Diego Chavarria 49-yard field goal, 10:02. Falcons 10–7. Drive: 6 plays, 13 yards, 3:27.
- MSU – Kaden Brown 5-yard run (Kohen Maroney kick), 4:19. Mustangs 14–10. Drive: 13 plays, 70 yards, 5:37.
- UTPB – Diego Chavarria 19-yard field goal, 0:00. Mustangs 14–13. Drive: 14 plays, 79 yards, 4:13.

Third quarter

- MSU – Dominic Cox 41-yard pass from Kaden Brown (Kohen Maroney kick), 11:39. Mustangs 21–13. Drive: 7 plays, 64 yards, 3:14.
- MSU – Kaden Brown 6-yard run (Kohen Maroney kick), 9:23. Mustangs 28–13. Drive: 2 plays, 17 yards, 0:41.
- MSU – Daniel Scarbino 12-yard fumble return (Kohen Maroney kick), 8:24. Mustangs 35–13.
- UTPB – Nate TenBarge 1-yard run (Diego Chavarria kick), 4:26. Mustangs 35–20. Drive: 2 plays, 15 yards, 0:42.
- MSU – Aanjay Feliciano 47-yard pass from Kaden Brown (Kohen Maroney kick), 1:27. Mustangs 42–20. Drive: 7 plays, 85 yards, 2:50.

Fourth quarter

- UTPB – Traylen Suel 14-yard pass from Braxton Baker (Diego Chavarria kick), 13:37. Mustangs 42–27. Drive: 9 plays, 75 yards, 2:50.
- UTPB – Tre Brown 12-yard pass from Braxton Baker (Diego Chavarria kick), 10:21. Mustangs 42–34. Drive: 4 plays, 47 yards, 1:28.
- MSU – Kenji Johnson 1-yard run (Kohen Maroney kick), 1:42. Mustangs 49–34. Drive: 8 plays, 40 yards, 4:12.

| Statistics | UTPB | MSU |
|---|---|---|
| First downs | 23 | 24 |
| Total yards | 289 | 407 |
| Rushing yards | -29 | 195 |
| Passing yards | 318 | 212 |
| Turnovers | 4 | 3 |
| Time of possession | 26:29 | 33:31 |

| Team | Category | Player | Statistics |
|---|---|---|---|
| UT Permian Basin | Passing | Braxton Baker | 32/50, 318 yards, 2 TD, INT |
| UT Permian Basin | Rushing | Cheno Navarrette | 6 rushes, 22 yards |
| UT Permian Basin | Receiving | Tre Brown | 13 receptions, 129 yards, TD |
| Midwestern State | Passing | Kaden Brown | 19/27, 212 yards, 3 TD, 2 INT |
| Midwestern State | Rushing | Kaden Brown | 13 rushes, 94 yards, 2 TD |
| Midwestern State | Receiving | Aanjay Feliciano | 3 receptions, 73 yards, TD |

=== Texas A&M–Kingsville ===
Texas A&M–Kingsville Javelinas at UT Permian Basin Falcons – Game summary

| Quarter | 1 | 2 | 3 | 4 | OT | Total |
|---|---|---|---|---|---|---|
| Javelinas | 7 | 0 | 10 | 7 | 6 | 30 |
| Falcons | 3 | 7 | 7 | 7 | 0 | 24 |

at Astound Broadband Stadium, Midland, Texas

- Date: November 14
- Game time: 2:00 p.m. CDT
- Game weather: Sunny
- Game attendance: 1,563
- Referee: Jason Hickey
- Box score, Recap

Game information
First quarter
- UTPB – Diego Chavarria 25-yard field goal, 3:55. Falcons 3–0. Drive: 13 plays, 47 yards, 5:37.
- TAMK – Edward Chumley 75-yard run (Daniel Guana kick), 3:44. Javelinas 7–3. Drive: 1 play, 75 yards, 0:11.

Second quarter

- UTPB – Nate TenBarge 8-yard run (Diego Chavarria kick), 9:27. Falcons 10–7. Drive: 9 plays, 50 yards, 4:38.

Third quarter

- TAMK – Edward Chumley 1-yard run (Daniel Guana kick), 7:58. Javelinas 14–10. Drive: 9 plays, 84 yards, 3:53.
- UTPB – Cheno Navarrette 7-yard pass from Nate TenBarge (Diego Chavarria kick), 6:26. Falcons 17–14. Drive: 4 plays, 75 yards, 1:32.
- TAMK – Daniel Guana 25-yard field goal, 3:51. Tied 17–17. Drive: 7 plays, 65 yards, 2:26.

Fourth quarter

- UTPB – Cheno Navarrette 3-yard run (Diego Chavarria kick), 14:32. Falcons 24–17. Drive: 5 plays, 15 yards, 1:40.
- TAMK – Kendon Jones 14-yard punt return (Daniel Guana kick), 7:03. Tied 24–24.

Overtime

- TAMK – Mills Dawson 6-yard run. Javelinas 30–24. Drive: 5 plays, 25 yards.

| Statistics | TAMK | UTPB |
|---|---|---|
| First downs | 16 | 24 |
| Total yards | 409 | 377 |
| Rushing yards | 243 | 155 |
| Passing yards | 166 | 222 |
| Turnovers | 1 | 3 |
| Time of possession | 24:56 | 35:04 |

| Team | Category | Player | Statistics |
|---|---|---|---|
| Texas A&M–Kingsville | Passing | Mills Dawson | 13/25, 166 yards, INT |
| Texas A&M–Kingsville | Rushing | Edward Chumley | 30 rushes, 236 yards, 2 TD |
| Texas A&M–Kingsville | Receiving | Jake Calcagno | 1 reception, 51 yards |
| UT Permian Basin | Passing | Nate TenBarge | 15/24, 160 yards, TD, 2 INT |
| UT Permian Basin | Rushing | Cheno Navarrette | 9 rushes, 70 yards, TD |
| UT Permian Basin | Receiving | Camden Tyler | 3 receptions, 56 yards |
