= Astound Broadband Stadium =

Sports stadium in Midland, Texas, U.S.

Coordinates: 31.9884°N 102.1522°W

- Interactive map of Astound Broadband Stadium
- Former names: Grande Communications Stadium (2002–2022)
- Address: 801 North Loop 250 West
- Location: Midland, Texas 79703
- Owner: City of Midland
- Operator: Midland RockHounds
- Capacity: 18,000 (15,000 seated)
- Surface: Synthetic Grass

Construction
- Opened: 2002
- Architects: Parkhill, Smith & Cooper, Inc. Architects Engineers Planners

Tenants
- Legacy High School (2002–present); Midland High School (2002–present); West Texas FC (NPSL) (2009–present); FPS FC (UPSL) (2019–present); UT Permian Basin (NCAA) (2020, 2026–present)

The Astound Broadband Stadium is a 15,000-seat (18,000 capacity) stadium located in Midland, Texas. The stadium plays host to the American football and soccer teams for both Legacy High School and Midland High School, plus the West Texas FC franchise in USL League Two, which is the fourth tier of American soccer. Additionally, the West Texas Drillers adult tackle football team of the Minor Professional Football League (MPFL) as well as the West Texas Pride Minor League Football team of the Rio Grande Football League (RGFL) call the stadium home.

The stadium also serves as an alternate home stadium for the UT Permian Basin football team, serving as the team's home venue for the 2020 season as Ratliff Stadium, the team's primary home stadium, was being used as a mass COVID-19 vaccination site. Astound Broadband Stadium will serve as the Falcons' home stadium for the 2026 season, marking the first time since 2020 that Ratliff will not host a game.

The stadium is part of the Scharbauer Sports Complex, together with the 5,000-seat Momentum Bank Ballpark.

== History ==
Originally named Grande Communications Stadium, the stadium was renamed on August 16, 2022.

The stadium is owned by the city of Midland, who rents out the stadium to Midland ISD for sporting events. In early August 2023, the city offered to sell the stadium to the school district. However, the school district turned down the city's offer and will continue to rent the stadium from the city.
