= Ryan Tucker =

American football player (born 1975)

No. 50, 72
- Position: Offensive tackle

Personal information
- Born: June 12, 1975 (age 51); Midland, Texas, U.S.
- Listed height: 6 ft 6 in (1.98 m)
- Listed weight: 315 lb (143 kg)

Career information
- High school: Lee (Midland)
- College: Texas Christian
- NFL draft: 1997: 4th round, 112th overall pick

Career history
- St. Louis Rams (1997–2001); Cleveland Browns (2002–2009)

Awards and highlights
- Super Bowl champion (XXXIV); First-team All-SWC (1995)

Career NFL statistics
- Games played: 134
- Games started: 102
- Fumble recoveries: 4
- Stats at Pro Football Reference

Ryan Tucker (born June 12, 1975) is an American former professional football player who was an offensive tackle for the St. Louis Rams and Cleveland Browns in the National Football League (NFL). He was selected by the St. Louis Rams in the fourth round of the 1997 NFL draft. He played college football for the TCU Horned Frogs.

Tucker is the older brother of former NFL offensive lineman Rex Tucker and Kyle Tucker.

== Early life ==
Tucker attended Robert E. Lee High School in Midland, Texas. After his professional football retirement from the Cleveland Browns, Ryan moved with his wife and four children to Midland, Texas, where they now reside.

== College career ==
Tucker played college football for Texas Christian University. He was twice awarded All-SWC honors for the 1995 and 1996 seasons. Entered college as a Tight End, then made the transition to offensive line. Started games at left, right tackle and center.

== Professional career ==
Pre-draft measurables
Height	Weight	Arm length	Hand span
6 ft 5 7/8 in (1.98 m)	285 lb (129 kg)	33 5/8 in (0.85 m)	10 7/8 in (0.28 m)
All values from NFL Combine

=== St. Louis Rams ===
He was selected by the St. Louis Rams in the fourth round (121st overall) in the 1997 NFL draft. In his rookie season he played in seven games and made his NFL debut at the Green Bay Packers on November 2. The 1998 season was masked by a neck injury that made him inactive for nine games. In 1999, he played in all 16 regular season games and three post season games including Super Bowl XXXIV. He scored his first NFL touchdown at the Detroit Lions on November 7. In 2000, he started in all 16 games for the first time in his career. He helped the Rams offense to 7,075 total yards for the season which is an NFL record. The 2001 season saw him play in 16 games with 15 starts, he was again part of a rampant offense and he also played in Super Bowl XXXVI.

=== Cleveland Browns ===
Tucker signed with the Browns as an unrestricted free agent on March 7, 2002. In his first season with the Browns he started 14 games. In his second season with the Browns, Tucker started in all 16 games and was the only offensive player to take part in every snap. He started in seven games in the 2004 season but a knee injury forced him to miss the remainder of the campaign. In 2005, Tucker again started in all 16 games. In 2006, he started 9 games before being placed on the non-football injury reserve list. On August 3, 2007, it was announced that Tucker tested positive for a banned substance. He was suspended for the first four games of the regular season. Upon his reinstatement, he started 8 of the team's final 12 games at the right guard position. The Browns placed Tucker on injured reserve on August 31, 2009. On March 6, 2010, Tucker was suspended for the first eight games of the regular season. The news broke a day after he announced his retirement.

== Coaching career ==
Tucker is an offensive line coach at Midland Christian High School, and the team has won two state championships while he has been a coach.
