= Midland Independent School District =

School district in Texas, United States

Coordinates: 31°59′46″N 102°4′53″W

Address
- 615 West Missouri Avenue ESC Region 18 Midland, Texas, 79701; United States

District information
- Type: Public
- Motto: All students will graduate prepared and ready for college or career.
- Grades: PreK–12
- Superintendent: Dr. Stephanie D. Howard
- Deputy superintendent(s): Roberto Cedillo, Deputy Superintendent Ashley Osborne, Assoc. Superintendent
- School board: District 1: Michael Booker District 2: Robert Marquez District 3: Tommy Bishop, President District 4: Katie Joyner, Vice President District 5: Brandon Hodges District 6: Sara Burleson, Secretary District 7: Bryan Murry
- Governing agency: TEA
- NCES District ID: 4830570

Students and staff
- Students: 25,579
- Teachers: 1,661.17
- Staff: 1,351.39
- Student–teacher ratio: 15.4
- Athletic conference: University Interscholastic League

Other information
- Website: www.midlandisd.net

Midland Independent School District is a public school district in Midland, Texas. Midland ISD contains 41 campuses.

It includes the portions of Midland and Odessa in Midland County.

Led by Superintendent of Schools Dr. Stephanie D. Howard, over 26,000 students are spread out amongst the various campuses.

In 2014-2015, the school district was rated "academically acceptable" by the Texas Education Agency.

== Schools ==
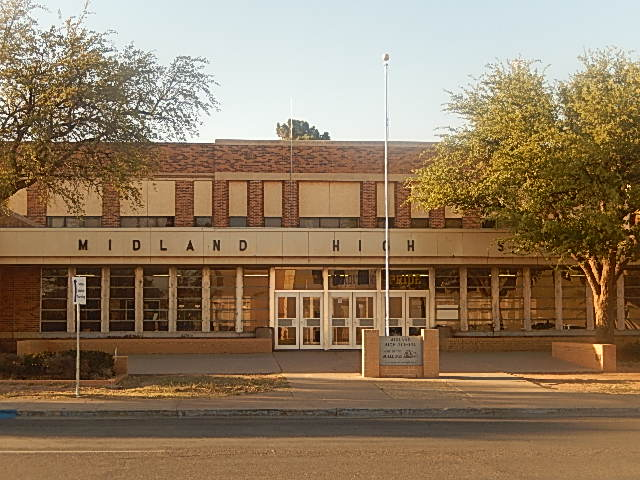
Entrance to Midland High School

=== Secondary Campuses ===
==== Senior High Campuses ====
- Lee High School (10-12) and Lee Freshman High School (9)
- Midland High School (10-12) and Midland Freshman High School (9)

==== Freshman High Campuses ====
- Midland Lee Freshman High School
- Midland Freshman High School

==== Junior High Campuses ====
- George Thomas Abell Junior High School
  - Opened in 1993.
- Alamo Junior High School
  - Opened in the 1956.
- Robert Hutchings Goddard Junior High School
- San Jacinto Junior High School
  - Built in 1951.

=== Elementary Campuses ===
- James Bonham Elementary School
  - Built in 1957. Serves about 800 students.
- Ralph Bunche Elementary School
  - Operated as Bunche Early Childhood for many years. Previous campus was torn down and re-built with 2012 bond.
- David Burnet Elementary School
- George H. W. Bush Elementary School
  - The school opened in 1989 when George H.W. Bush was President. As of 2019 it has 460 students.
- Lorenzo DeZavala Elementary School
- Ralph Waldo Emerson Elementary School
- James Walker Fannin Elementary School
- Barbara Fasken Elementary School
  - Opened in 2015
- General Tommy Franks Elementary School
  - Overhauled and rebranded 2017. Former Crockett Elementary.
- Barney R. Greathouse Elementary School
  - Opened in 1993. Serves about 750 students.
- James Henderson Elementary School
- Anson Jones Elementary School
- Lone Star Trails Elementary School
- Jane Long Elementary School
- Quanah Parker Elementary School
- Thomas Rusk Elementary School
- Santa Rita Elementary School
  - Opened in 1985.
- Ruth Cowden Scharbauer Elementary School
  - Opened in 1985.
- South Elementary School
- Barbara B Yarbrough Elementary School
  - Opened in 2015.

=== School Of Choice Campuses ===
Secondary Schools

- Viola M. Coleman High School
  - Opened in 1989 as Midland Alternative School and renamed to current name in 1992. Viola M. Coleman high school offers individualized learning, flexible schedule, early graduation, dual credit, or credit recovery. Offers in person or virtual learning. Serves grades 9-12.
- Early College High School at Midland College
  - Serves grades 9-12. Focused on a rigorous academic program that leads to high school diploma and Associates Degree at graduation.
- Young Women's Leadership Academy
  - Opened in 2019 with grades 6-7. Expanded to serve grades 6-11 as of 2023-2024 and will add 12th grade the following school year. Focus on college preparatory academics, leadership development through community service, and health and wellness.

Elementary Schools

- Bowie Fine Arts Academy
  - Magnet school
- Carver Center School
  - Opened in 2011 as a full time elementary school for identified gifted and talented students in grades 2-6. Added 1st grade in 2015. Operates as a charter school.
- Lamar Elementary School
- Milam International Academy
  - Dual language program serving PreK-6.
- Pease Communications & Technology Academy
  - Magnet school
- Sam Houston Collegiate Preparatory Elementary
  - Charter school serving K-6.

Other Schools

- IDEA Travis Academy
  - Opened in 2020 as a charter school within MISD. Serves grades PreK-9 as of 2023-2024 and has 1056 students enrolled.

=== Early Childhood Campuses ===
- Pre-Kindergarten Academy at Midland College

=== Former Schools ===
Former Secondary Schools

- George Washington Carver Junior-Senior High School
  - Became Carver Cultural Center which was a place where 1st-3rd graders would take field trips for the day to learn about other cultures around the world. The students got to make crafts, try foods, and learn about the different places around the world. Simultaneously it served GEM students. These gifted students in grades 4th through 6th would attend their home campus 3 days a week and attend GEM at Carver Center 2 days a week. They had to keep up with work from both schools. Campus now houses Carver Center for the gifted and talented kids full time.
- Midland High School (Original Campus)
  - First building to be officially named Midland High School was built in 1926 on the site of what is now Fasken Center, at 600 Texas Street. After 23 years at the Texas Street location, in 1949 Midland High School moved to its present location at 906 W. Illinois.
- Stephen F. Austin Junior High School (now Legacy Freshman)
- William Cowden Junior High School
  - Was located on the site of the current Midland High School at 906 W. Illinois. Torn down to build MHS in 1949.
- Thomas Edison Junior High School (now Midland Freshman)

Former Elementary Schools

- James Bowie Elementary School
  - Became a magnet school, Bowie Fine Arts Academy.
- David Crockett Elementary School
  - Campus opened in the 1950s. Closed in 2017 after 6 years of the Texas Education Agency rating it as “improvement required." Now houses General Tommy Franks Elementary School for the kids residing in new subdivisions north of town.
- Sam Houston Elementary School
  - President George W. Bush attended here as a child. Became charter school, Sam Houston Collegiate Prep.
- Mirabeau Lamar Elementary School
  - Became charter school, Lamar Elementary.
- Ben Milam Elementary School
  - Became charter school, Milam International Academy.
- North Elementary School
- Elisha Pease Elementary School
  - Became magnet school, Pease Communications & Technology Academy.
- William Travis Elementary School
  - Became IDEA Travis Academy Charter School.
- Booker T. Washington Elementary School
  - Became magnet school, Washington Math & Science Institute then was renamed to Washington STEM Academy which closed for good in 2022 due to low enrollment and low performance. Campus now houses Young Women's Leadership Academy.
- West Elementary School
  - Became West Early Childhood which housed Head Start services until the school closed for good.

== See also ==
- List of school districts in Texas
