= George Washington Carver High School (Midland, Texas) =

- 1300 East Wall; Midland, Texas; U.S.

Information
- Former name: The Colored School
- Type: Public
- Nickname: Hornets

George Washington Carver Junior-Senior High School was a public secondary school in Midland, Texas. It served as the high school for black students (alternate facilities were maintained for Hispanic children and white children) until the public schools were integrated. The school closed in 1968 after the schools were integrated.

== History ==
Education for the black children of Midland started in 1931 within the Greater St. Luke Church. In 1933, the Colored School, the first public school for african-americans, was built at the location that would later become Carver Junior and Senior High School, then Carver Cultural Center. After the death of George Washington Carver, the school was renamed in his honor. In 1949 enrollment reached 550 and in 1950 a six-room brick building was raised which included a gym, an auditorium, a book room, dark room and an office suite. In 1953 Booker T. Washington elementary was built and Carver became a junior and senior high school. In 1968 the seniors were allowed to remain at Carver while the rest of the students were transferred to either Midland High School or Robert E. Lee. The buildings were reopened the next year as Carver Cultural Center. In 2011 the school reopened as a program for the gifted and talented in grades two through six.

== Athletics ==
In 1961, under the direction of head coach Johnny Williams, Carver won the Texas state football championship, the first state championship of any kind for Midland. The school also won a state basketball championship in the 1963. Much of their equipment was used equipment the white schools no longer needed.
