= U Sports Goaltender of the Year =

The U Sports Goaltender of the Year is the annual award presented to the U Sports men's ice hockey player who is judged by a committee of the U Sports Men’s Hockey Coaches Association to be the most outstanding goaltender in U Sports.

== Winners ==
- 2016–17: Jordon Cooke (University of Saskatchewan)
- 2015–16: Jordon Cooke (University of Saskatchewan)
- 2014–15: Anthony Peters (Saint Mary's University)
- 2013–14: Jacob DeSerres (University of Calgary)
- 2012–13: Kurtis Mucha (University of Alberta)
- 2011–12: Real Cyr (University of Alberta)
- 2010–11: Dustin Butler (University of Calgary)
- 2009–10: Steve Christie (University of Manitoba)
