= Mike Babcock (American football) =

American football coach (born 1979)

Current position
- Title: Offensive Coordinator & Quarterback coach
- Team: Presbyterian College
- Conference: Pioneer Football League

Biographical details
- Born: February 13, 1979 (age 47); Walnut Creek, California, U.S.
- Education: University of California, Los Angeles (2002, 2005)

Playing career
- 1997–1999: UCLA
- Position: Linebacker

Coaching career (HC unless noted)
- 2000: UCLA (GA)
- 2001–2002: UCLA (LB)
- 2003: UCLA (DL)
- 2004: UCLA (OL)
- 2005–2006: Colorado (OL/TE/ST)
- 2007: San Diego (TE)
- 2008–2012: CSU Pueblo (QB)
- 2013–2023: McKendree
- 2024: UCLA (spec. assistant to the HC)
- 2025: UT Permian Basin (AHC/OL)
- 2025–present: Presbyterian College (OC/QB)

Head coaching record
- Overall: 58–52
- Bowls: 0–1

Michael Babcock (born February 13, 1979) is an American college football coach. He is the assistant head coach and offensive line coach for the University of Texas Permian Basin, positions he had held since 2025. He was the head football coach for McKendree University from 2013 to 2023. He also coached for UCLA, Colorado, San Diego, and CSU Pueblo. He played college football for UCLA as a linebacker.

On December 23, 2025, Babcock was named interim head coach at UT Permian Basin following Kris McCullough's departure to Gardner–Webb.

== Head coaching record ==
Year	Team	Overall	Conference	Standing	Bowl/playoffs
McKendree Bearcats (Great Lakes Valley Conference) (2013–2023)
2013	McKendree	4–6	3–4	5th	
2014	McKendree	5–6	5–3	T–2nd	
2015	McKendree	8–2	6–2	2nd	
2016	McKendree	8–3	6–2	3rd	
2017	McKendree	7–4	5–2	T–2nd	
2018	McKendree	6–5	4–3	4th	
2019	McKendree	5–6	3–4	5th	
2020–21	McKendree	1–1	1–1	2nd (East)	
2021	McKendree	4–7	3–4	T–5th	
2022	McKendree	5–6	2–4	T–4th	
2023	McKendree	5–6	5–2	T–2nd	L America's Crossroads
McKendree:		58–52	43–31		
Total:		58–52			
