= UT Permian Basin Falcons football =

College football team

2026 UT Permian Basin Falcons football team
- First season: 2016; 10 years ago
- Athletic director: Todd Dooley
- Head coach: Chris Softley; 1st season, 0–0 (–)
- Location: Odessa, Texas
- Stadium: Ratliff Stadium (capacity: 17,931)
- NCAA division: Division II
- Conference: LSC
- Colors: Falcon orange and black
- All-time record: 53–56 (.486)
- Playoff record: 2–2 (.500)
- Bowl record: 0–2 (.000)

Conference championships
- 1 LSC (2023)
- Fight song: Fighting Falcons
- Mascot: Freddy Falcon
- Website: utpbfalcons.com

The UT Permian Basin Falcons football team represents the University of Texas Permian Basin (abbreviated as UTPB) in college football at the NCAA Division II level. The Falcons are members of the Lone Star Conference (LSC), fielding its team in the LSC since 2016. The Falcons play their home games at Ratliff Stadium in Odessa, Texas while Astound Broadband Stadium in the neighboring city of Midland, Texas serves as an alternate home stadium.

They are led by head coach Chris Softley, who took over the position following the 2025 season.

== History ==
In December 2013, the University of Texas System Regents approved the business plan that the University of Texas Permian Basin needed to secure $9.5 million be the end of 2014 in order to support the first five years of their American football program, including start-up costs and four seasons of play. In order to help fund the required amount, the $35 student union fee was transformed into an athletic fee. The school hoped to expand the school's student body up to 8,000 students by 2020, hoping that football would help expand the student population.

On October 15, 2014, the UTPB announced that the school had secured the necessary $9.5 million in funding to move forward with establishing the school's football program. The team was slated to begin play for the 2016 season. The school began its search for a head coach in November 2014.

=== Justin Carrigan era (2016–2022) ===
On January 8, 2015, the school hired former Tarleton State offensive coordinator Justin Carrigan as the school's first head coach. Carrigan played college football for Angelo State and also coached for Midwestern State and UTEP along with his stint at Tarleton State.

The team's first season consisted of seven home games and four away games. The team's home games were played at Ratliff Stadium in Odessa, Texas, and also hosted a game annually at Astound Broadband Stadium in Midland, Texas, Starting off the season they faced Division III Sul Ross in their first-ever game. The Falcons won 27–6 and the school's football program officially played, and won, its first ever game as a Division II school. The team won their next game against NAIA opponent Arizona Christian before losing their remaining nine games of the season.

The following three seasons, the team went 2–9 in 2017, 2–9 in 2018, and an improved 4–7 in 2019. In 2020, due to the COVID-19 pandemic, the Lone Star Conference announced that it would not be holding conference play. Despite the conference not officially holding in-conference play, UTPB still played fellow conference members, Western New Mexico, Texas A&M–Kingsville, and Midwestern State as the games were not counted as conference games. Due to Ratliff Stadium being used as a mass COVID-19 vaccination hub, the school used Grande Communications Stadium as their home field. In the shortened season, the Falcons won all five of their matchups and finished the season with a 5–0 record—their highest win total under Carrigan. In 2021 and 2022, the team finished 5–6 and made it to the Heritage Bowl in 2021. On November 28, 2022, Carrigan announced that he was stepping down as the head coach of the school's football team after reaching the team's first-ever bowl game a year prior.

=== Kris McCullough era (2023–2025) ===
On December 22, 2022, the school hired former East Central head coach Kris McCullough to be the school's second head coach. McCullough previously coached for Henderson State, Old Dominion, and Fairmont State before joining East Central. He was promoted to head coach for the 2022 season and lead the team to a Heritage Bowl win.

In McCullough's coaching debut he helped lead the Falcons to a 96–0 win over NAIA opponent Texas College; the 96 points scored are the most in program history. Two weeks later, the Falcons would score 80-plus points again, defeating Southwest Baptist 86–7. On October 16, 2023, the Falcons were ranked no. 25 in the D2 Football poll, marking the first time in program history that the Falcons were ranked in a national poll. A week later, October 23, the Falcons were ranked in the AFCA poll for the first time in program history, entering the poll at no. 22. The Falcons would finish the regular season at 10–1, 8–0 in LSC play, securing both the program's first winning season (outside of the amended spring 2021 season) and first conference title. McCullough would be named LSC coach of the year while quarterback Kenny Hrncir was named LSC Offensive Player of the Year. The Falcons received a bid for the NCAA Division II playoffs for the first time in program history, hosting Bemidji State in the first round.

The 2024 team finished with an overall record of 7–5 (6–3 in LSC play), marking the first time in program history that the Falcons finished with a winning record in back-to-back seasons. The team received the conference's bid for the Heritage Bowl, which was the program's second bowl appearance.

The Falcons would finish the 2025 regular season with an overall record of 9–2, going 7–2 in LSC play to finish in a three-way tie for second. The team received a bid for the NCAA Division II playoffs, facing off against CSU Pueblo in the first round. The Falcons defeated the TunderWolves 37–24 for the first playoff win in program history. In the second round, the Falcons defeated Western Colorado in overtime, 21–15, after being down 15–0 in the fourth quarter.

On December 23, McCullough announced that he would be stepping down as the Falcons' head coach, with assistant head coach Mike Babcock being named interim coach. Later that day it was revealed that McCullough had been hired as the new head coach for Gardner–Webb.

=== Chris Softley era (2026–present) ===
On December 31, 2025, Lubbock Christian School head coach Chris Softley was named the program's third head coach.

== Conference affiliations ==
- Lone Star Conference (2016–present)

== List of head coaches ==
=== Key ===
Key to symbols in coaches list
General		Overall		Conference		Postseason (Note: Although the first Rose Bowl Game was played in 1902, it has been continuously played since the 1916 game, and is recognized as the oldest bowl game by the NCAA. "—" indicates any season prior to 1916 when postseason games were not played.)	
No.	Order of coaches (Note: A running total of the number of head coaches, with coaches who served separate tenures being counted only once. Interim head coaches are represented with "Int" and are not counted in the running total. "—" indicates the team played but either without a coach or no coach is on record. "X" indicates an interim year without play.)	GC	Games coached	CW	Conference wins	PW	Postseason wins
DC	Division championships	OW	Overall wins	CL	Conference losses	PL	Postseason losses
CC	Conference championships	OL	Overall losses	CT	Conference ties	PT	Postseason ties
NC	National championships	OT	Overall ties (Note: Overtime rules in college football were introduced in 1996, making ties impossible in the period since.)	C%	Conference winning percentage		
†	Elected to the College Football Hall of Fame	O%	Overall winning percentage (Note: When computing the win–loss percentage, a tie counts as half a win and half a loss.)				

=== Coaches ===
List of head football coaches showing season(s) coached, overall records, conference records, postseason records, championships and selected awards
No.	Name	Season(s)	GC	OW	OL	O%	CW	CL	C%	PW	PL	DC	CC	NC	Awards
1	Justin Carrigan	2016–2022	61	25	36	0.410	11	28	0.282	0	1	–	–	–	–
2	Kris McCullough	2023–2025	38	28	10	0.737	21	5	0.808	2	3	–	1	–	2023 LSC Coach of the Year
3	Chris Softley	2026–present	0			–			–			–		–	

=== Current coaching staff ===
UT Permian Basin Falcons
Name	Position	Consecutive season at UT Permian Basin in current position	Previous position	UTPB profile
Tommy Crayton	Assistant head coach / Tackles and tight ends	1st	Western Illinois – Tight ends / fullbacks / co-special teams coordinator (2023)	
Blake Crandall	Co-offensive coordinator / wide receivers	2nd	East Central – Running backs (2022)	
Kenny Hrncir	Co-offensive coordinator / quarterbacks	1st	None	
Jake Shaw	Defensive coordinator	1st	East Central – Defensive coordinator / inside linebackers (2022–2023)	
Devin Gaulden	Co-defensive coordinator / secondary	1st	Delta State – Defensive backs (2022–2023)	
Zack Santolla	Defensive line / run game coordinator	1st	Charleston – Defensive line / defensive run game coordinator (2016–2023)	
Spencer Region	Interior offensive line	1st	UT Permian Basin – Assistant offensive line and tight ends (2023)	
Marquez Gollman	Safeties	1st	Louisiana Tech – Graduate assistant (2023)	
Hayden Kelly	Linebackers	1st	None	

== Year-by-year results ==
National champions	Conference champions	Bowl game berth	Playoff berth

Season	Year	Head Coach	Association	Division	Conference	Record					Postseason	Final AFCA ranking
Season	Year	Head Coach	Association	Division	Conference	Overall		Conference			Postseason	Final AFCA ranking
Season	Year	Head Coach	Association	Division	Conference	Win	Loss	Finish	Win	Loss	Postseason	Final AFCA ranking
UT Permian Basin Falcons
2016	2016	Justin Carrigan	NCAA	Division II	LSC	2	9	10th	0	9	—	—
2017	2017	Justin Carrigan	NCAA	Division II	LSC	2	9	T–8th	1	7	—	—
2018	2018	Justin Carrigan	NCAA	Division II	LSC	2	9	8th	1	7	—	—
2019	2019	Justin Carrigan	NCAA	Division II	LSC	4	7	7th	2	6	—	—
2020–21	2020	Justin Carrigan	NCAA	Division II	LSC	5	0	N/A	0	0	—	—
2021	2021	Justin Carrigan	NCAA	Division II	LSC	5	6	T–5th	3	4	L Heritage Bowl	—
2022	2022	Justin Carrigan	NCAA	Division II	LSC	5	6	7th	4	5	—	—
2023	2023	Kris McCullough	NCAA	Division II	LSC	10	2	1st	8	0	L NCAA Division II First Round	18
2024	2024	Kris McCullough	NCAA	Division II	LSC	7	5	T–3rd	6	3	L Heritage Bowl	—
2025	2025	Kris McCullough	NCAA	Division II	LSC	11	3	T–2nd	7	2	L NCAA Division II Quarterfinal	5
2026	2026	Chris Softley	NCAA	Division II	LSC	0	0	TBD	0	0	—	—

== Individual accomplishments ==
=== All-Americans ===
List of All-Americans showing the year won, player, position, and team
Year	Player name	Position	Team
2019	Chris Hoad	LB	Second Team
2020	Chris Hoad	LB	Second Team

=== LSC Player of the Year ===
Offensive player of the year

Year	Player name	Position
2023	Kenny Hrncir	QB

Defensive player of the year

Year	Player name	Position
2025	Tristan Exline	LB

== All-time record vs. LSC teams ==
Official record (including any NCAA imposed vacates and forfeits) against all current LSC opponents as of the completion of the 2025 season.

Opponent	Won	Lost	Pct.	Streak	First meeting	Latest meeting
Angelo State	2	7	.222	Won 1	2016	2025
Central Washington	2	2	.500	Lost 1	2022	2025
Eastern New Mexico	6	3	.667	Won 6	2016	2025
Midwestern State	4	6	.400	Won 2	2016	2025
Oklahoma Panhandle State*	0	1	.000	Lost 1	2016	2016
Simon Fraser*	1	0	1.000	Won 1	2022	2022
Sul Ross	3	1	.750	Won 2	2016	2025
Tarleton State*	0	4	.000	Lost 4	2016	2019
Texas A&M–Commerce*	0	5	.000	Lost 5	2016	2021
Texas A&M–Kingsville	4	6	.400	Won 1	2016	2025
West Texas A&M	4	5	.444	Won 3	2016	2025
Western New Mexico	8	2	.800	Won 5	2016	2025
Western Oregon	2	2	.500	Lost 2	2022	2025
Totals	36	44	.450			

* Signifies former LSC members

== Bowl games ==
The Falcons have an all-time bowl game record of 0–2.

Season	Event	Opponent	Result	Source
2021	Heritage Bowl	Oklahoma Baptist	L 21–24	
2024	Heritage Bowl	Central Missouri	L 37–39 ^{2OT}	

== Playoffs ==
=== NCAA Division II ===
The Falcons have made two appearances in the NCAA Division II playoffs, with a record of 2–1.

Year	Round	Opponent	Result
2023	First Round	Bemidji State	L, 3–10
2025	First Round; Second Round; Quarterfinal	CSU Pueblo; Western Colorado; Harding	W, 37–24; W, 21–15 ^{OT} L, 28–34

== Notable former players ==
- Corin Brooks, OT – Kansas City Chiefs and New York Giants (2017)

== See also ==
- UT Permian Basin Falcons
