= K. C. Jones (American football) =

American football player (born 1974)

No. 60
- Position: Center

Personal information
- Born: March 28, 1974 (age 52); Midland, Texas, U.S.
- Listed height: 6 ft 1 in (1.85 m)
- Listed weight: 275 lb (125 kg)

Career information
- High school: Lee (Midland)
- College: Miami (FL)
- NFL draft: 1997: undrafted

Career history
- Denver Broncos (1997–2002)

Awards and highlights
- First-team All-American (1996); Third-team All-American (1994)

Career NFL statistics
- Games played: 16
- Stats at Pro Football Reference

Kirk Cameron Jones (born March 28, 1974) is an American former professional football player who was a center for the Denver Broncos of the National Football League (NFL) from 1997 to 2000. He played college football for the Miami Hurricanes from 1993 to 1996 at the center position. Jones was inducted into the University of Miami Sports Hall of Fame in 2008.

Jones was interviewed about his time at the University of Miami for the documentary The U, which premiered December 12, 2009 on ESPN.
