= Dustin Butler =

Canadian ice hockey goaltender

- Born: December 30, 1987 (age 38) High River, Alberta, Canada
- Height: 6 ft 2 in (188 cm)
- Weight: 185 lb (84 kg; 13 st 3 lb)
- Position: Goaltender
- Caught: Left
- Played for: Colorado Eagles
- NHL draft: Undrafted
- Playing career: 2013–2014

Dustin Butler (born December 30, 1987) is a Canadian ice hockey goaltender.

He played five seasons (2008–2013) for the University of Calgary in the CWUAA conference of Canadian Interuniversity Sport (CIS). For his outstanding play during the 2010–11 season, Butler was selected as the 2010–11 CIS Goaltender of the Year and was also named to the 2010–11 CIS All-Canadian First Team.

On April 10, 2013, the Vancouver Canucks signed Butler to a try-out contract and he dressed as an emergency backup to Roberto Luongo for their National Hockey League game that same day against the Calgary Flames. He nearly got a chance to have a little ice time at the end of the game, but didn't get a stoppage in play for him to get in.

== Awards and honours ==
Award	Year
CIS First-Team All-Canadian	2010–11
CIS Goaltender of the Year	2010–11
