= Chris Softley =

American football coach

Current position
- Title: Head coach
- Team: UT Permian Basin
- Conference: LSC
- Record: 6–5

Biographical details
- Education: Abilene Christian University (2008)

Coaching career (HC unless noted)
- 2008–2010: Abilene Christian (GA)
- 2011–2012: Rockwall-Heath HS (TX) (assistant)
- 2013–2015: Sunnyvale HS (TX)
- 2016–2025: Lubbock Christian HS (TX)
- 2026–present: UT Permian Basin

Administrative career (AD unless noted)
- 2016–2025: Lubbock Christian HS (TX)

Head coaching record
- Overall: 6–5 (college); 101–22 (high school)

Chris Softley is an American football coach who is currently the head football coach at the University of Texas Permian Basin (UTPB), a position he has held since the 2026 season. Prior to UTPB, he was the head coach at Lubbock Christian High School, while also serving as athletic director, finishing with an overall record of 101–22 along with four state championship game appearances, winning the state title in 2022 and 2025. Prior to Lubbock Christian, Softley served as the head basketball coach at Sunnyvale High School, where he was also an assistant coach for the football and track teams, and previously coached at Rockwall-Heath High School.

== Head coaching record ==
=== College ===
Year	Team	Overall	Conference	Standing	Bowl/playoffs
UT Permian Basin Falcons (Lone Star Conference) (2026–present)
2026	UT Permian Basin	6–5	5–4	T–4th	
Total:		6–5			
