= Rex Tucker (American football) =

American football player (born 1976)

No. 64, 66, 74
- Position: Guard

Personal information
- Born: December 20, 1976 (age 49); Midland, Texas, U.S.
- Listed height: 6 ft 5 in (1.96 m)
- Listed weight: 315 lb (143 kg)

Career information
- High school: Lee (Midland)
- College: Texas A&M
- NFL draft: 1999: 3rd round, 66th overall pick

Career history
- Chicago Bears (1999–2004); St. Louis Rams (2005); Detroit Lions (2006)

Career NFL statistics
- Games played: 49
- Games started: 35
- Stats at Pro Football Reference

Rex T. Tucker (born December 20, 1976) is an American former professional football player who was an offensive guard in the National Football League (NFL). He was selected 66th overall in the 1999 NFL draft by the Chicago Bears for whom he played six seasons (1999–2004). He also played a season with the St. Louis Rams (2005–2006) and the Detroit Lions (2006–2007).

Rex Tucker is currently known to live in Midland, Texas. On February 25, 2009, he was a guest on the Jim Rome Show and was the tenth Rex interviewed in as many shows.

== Professional career ==
Pre-draft measurables
Height	Weight	Arm length	Hand span	40-yard dash	10-yard split	20-yard split	20-yard shuttle	Three-cone drill	Vertical jump	Broad jump	Bench press
6 ft 5 in (1.96 m)	303 lb (137 kg)	30 5/8 in (0.78 m)	10 1/4 in (0.26 m)	5.14 s	1.79 s	3.04 s	4.43 s	7.40 s	30.0 in (0.76 m)	8 ft 10 in (2.69 m)	27 reps
All values from NFL Combine

On August 28, 2007, he was cut by the Lions.

== National Football League Campus Testing ==
- 40-yard dash - 4.95 seconds
- 20 yard short shuttle - 4.49 seconds
- Vertical jump - 30 inches
- Maximum Bench Press - 390 pounds
- Maximum Squat - 525 pounds
