= Legacy High School (Midland, Texas) =

Lee High School
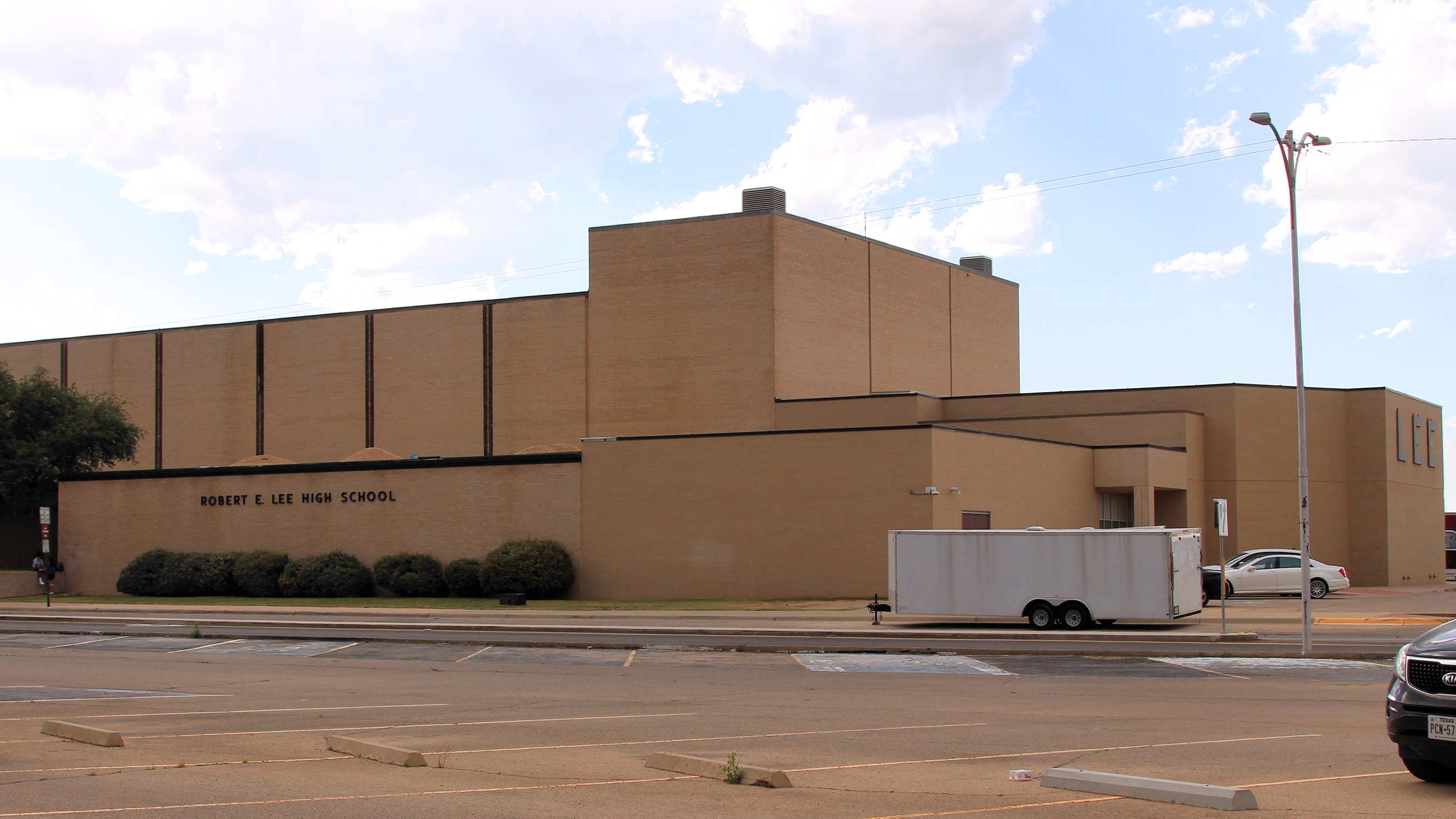

Location
- 3500 Neely Ave; Midland, Texas 79707; United States; 32.01188°N 102.12878°W

Information
- Type: Public secondary school
- Established: 1961; 65 years ago
- School district: Midland ISD
- Teaching staff: 139.71 (FTE)
- Grades: 10–12
- Enrollment: 2,656 (2023–2024)
- Student to teacher ratio: 19.01
- Colors: Maroon; Gray; White
- Athletics conference: UIL District 2-6A
- Nickname: Rebels
- Website: lhs.midlandisd.net

Midland Lee High School, renamed to “Lee” after a brief time as Legacy High School, is a public, co-educational secondary school in Midland, Texas. Lee High School is a part of the Midland Independent School District.

== History ==
The school originally opened its doors in 1961, seven years before the city’s high schools integrated. Named after Robert E. Lee, in October 2020 the Midland ISD school board voted to rename the school "Legacy High School". The Midland ISD board vote to rename had six board members voting for, and one voting against the school's name change. However, in August 2025, a vote decided to reinstate the nomenclature to the school, this time as “Lee High School”, by a vote of 4-3. The name change will go into effect ahead of the 2026-27 school year.

The feeder junior highs of Midland Lee High School are Abell Junior High School, Home of the Eagles, and Alamo Junior High School, home of the Scouts. The school is planning to build a new campus in the western area of Midland. It is expected to be ready by the 2028 school year.

== Athletics ==
=== Football ===
State championships: 1998, 1999, 2000

== Demographics ==
The demographic breakdown of the 2,338 students enrolled for 2020-2021 academic school year was:

- Native American/Alaskan - 0.3%
- Asian - 2.5%
- Pacific Islander - 0.1%
- Black - 7.1%
- Hispanic - 65%
- White - 22.7%
- Multiracial - 2.3%

54.4% of students are considered at risk of dropping out of school.

== Notable alumni ==
- Cedric Benson, National Football League (NFL) running back
- Chris Brazzell II, wide receiver for the Carolina Panthers
- Laura Bush, First Lady of the United States
- Dustin Butler, journalist
- Tommy Franks, General in the United States Army
- Susan Graham, opera singer
- K. C. Jones, NFL center
- Tommy Lee Jones, actor and director
- Austin Ligon, business executive
- Junior Miller, NFL tight end
- Josh Norman, NFL
- Tyrone Thurman, college football wide receiver
- Rex Tucker, NFL offensive lineman
- Ryan Tucker, NFL offensive lineman
- Randy Velarde, Major League Baseball (MLB) infielder
- Michael L. Williams, politician
- Allen Wilson, high school football coach
- Eric Winston, NFL offensive tackle
- Jake Young, college football center
