= Kris McCullough =

American football coach (born 1995)

Biographical details
- Born: October 11, 1995 (age 31); Pine Bluff, Arkansas, U.S.
- Education: Henderson State University; Arkansas State University

Coaching career (HC unless noted)
- 2015–2016: Henderson State (SA)
- 2017 (spring): Old Dominion (assistant QB/OQC)
- 2017: Fairmont State (assistant ST/RB)
- 2018–2019: East Central (ST/QB)
- 2020: East Central (OC/QB)
- 2021: East Central (AHC/OC/QB)
- 2022: East Central
- 2023–2025: UT Permian Basin
- 2026: Gardner–Webb

Head coaching record
- Overall: 37–14
- Bowls: 1–1
- Tournaments: 2–2 (NCAA D-II playoffs)

Accomplishments and honors

Championships
- GAC (2015); LSC (2023)

Awards
- LSC Coach of the Year (2023)

Kris McCullough (born October 11, 1995) is an American college football coach. He most recently was the head football coach for Gardner–Webb, a position he held from 2025 to 2026. He was the head football coach for East Central University in 2022. He previously coached for Henderson State, Old Dominion, and Fairmont State.

== Early life and education ==
McCullough was born in Pine Bluff, Arkansas, on October 11, 1995. He attended Watson Chapel High School where he played football and baseball. He received his bachelor's degree in integrated studies from Henderson State University before earning his master's degree in sports administration from Arkansas State University.

== Coaching career ==
=== Early coaching career ===
McCullough started his coaching career as a student assistant coach for his alma mater, Henderson State University. For two-and-a-half seasons from 2015 to the spring of 2017 he worked with the tight ends, running backs, wide receivers, and quarterbacks. With the team, he was a part of the 2015 Henderson State team that won their first-ever NCAA Division II playoff win after earning the Great American Conference (GAC) title along with coaching GAC Player of the Year, Jaquan Cole.

In the spring of 2017, McCullough joined Division I FBS Old Dominion as an assistant quarterbacks coach and as an offensive quality control coach, but departed prior to the start of the season.

In the fall of 2017, McCullough joined Fairmont State University as the team's assistant special teams coordinator and running backs coach. Alongside those duties he was also the video coordinator.

In 2018, McCullough joined East Central University as the special teams coordinator and quarterbacks coach. He held those positions until 2020 where he was promoted to offensive coordinator. In 2021 he added the title of assistant head coach. During his stint as offensive coordinator he helped lead the team to nine wins across the shortened 2020 COVID-19 season and 2021. In 2021, the team recorded a season-best, since 2015, 7–4 record.

=== Head coaching career ===
==== East Central ====
On March 10, 2022, McCullough was named interim head coach after the previous head coach, Al Johnson, was hired by Wisconsin. With his appointment to head coach he became the youngest head coach in all of college football at the age of 26. Despite losing his first two career games as head coach, he then led the team to a six-game winning streak which including six-straight 30-plus point games and two 40-plus games, including a season-high 44 against Southern Nazarene.

On October 27, 2022, the interim tag was removed and he was hired as the full-time head coach. He led the team to a 6–2 record up until that point before losing to Ouachita Baptist. He finished out his inaugural season going 3–0, beating Arkansas–Monticello, Southeastern Oklahoma State, and earned a bid to the Fun Town RV Heritage Bowl where they beat Texas A&M–Kingsville. The team finished with a 9–3 record which was the team's best finish since 1993 when they ended 10–3 and won the NAIA Championship under Hank Walbrick.

On December 23, 2022, McCullough announced that he was stepping down from his position.

==== UT Permian Basin ====
On December 22, 2022, less than two months after becoming full-time head coach for East Central, McCullough was hired by the University of Texas Permian Basin to be the team's second head coach all-time, replacing Justin Carrigan who left to take a role in the athletics department. In McCullough's first game with the Falcons, he outscored NAIA opponent Texas College 96–0, a program record, and just four points away from the century mark. The following week the team fell to non-conference opponent Western Colorado before once again scoring 80-plus and beating Southwest Baptist 86–7. Following the loss to Western Colorado, the team went on a six-game winning streak. They beat West Texas A&M; ranked Texas A&M–Kingsville in an upset—the same school he beat a year prior in a bowl game; Midwestern State; Eastern New Mexico; and the team's second upset win of the season beating ranked Angelo State. The Falcons were ranked No. 25 in the D2 Football poll released on October 16, marking the first time in program history that the Falcons were ranked in a national poll. A week later, on October 23, the Falcons would be ranked in the AFCA poll for the first time, debuting at No. 22. Alongside their first AFCA poll ranking in program history they also broke the previous D2 Football poll by earning the No. 19 rank. The Falcons would finish the regular season at 10–1, going 8–0 in conference play to win the LSC championship for the first time in program history. The historic season would continue as UTPB was selected for the NCAA Division II playoffs for the first time in program history, hosting, and losing to Bemidji State in the first round. McCullough was named the 2023 LSC Coach of the Year.

Following the season, McCullough was extended by the university through the 2026 season, along with incentives that can extend him until 2029. The new contract made him among the highest paid head football coaches in the Lone Star Conference.

2025

In 2025, McCullough received national acclaim joining Pop Warner and others to become the fourth coach in the history of college football to win 30 games by the age of 30.

Shortly after turning age 30, McCullough became the winningest coach in UTPB history.

UTPB's defeat of no. 5 Central Oklahoma in 2025 was the highest-ranked win in program history and McCullough added two more in 2025, defeating no. 5 Angelo State, and no. 4 CSU Pueblo becoming the first coach in UTPB history to attain three top five wins in one season.

UTPB was selected to the NCAA Division II playoffs for the second time under McCullough, who led the Falcons to their first postseason win in UTPB history, going on the road and defeating no. 4 CSU Pueblo 37–24. In the second round, the Falcons defeated no. 15 Western Colorado 21–15 in overtime after being down 15–0 in the fourth quarter.

UTPB lost to #2 Harding in the quarterfinals, 34-28, in what was the most competitive game Harding had played that season to that point, who went on to lose in the D2 championship game to Ferris State.

For their efforts, UTPB was ranked #3 in the final D2Football.com poll for 2025. This was the first time in school history that UTPB finished in the top 5 in any end of season football poll.

=== Gardner–Webb ===
On December 23, 2025, McCullough was announced as the new head coach at Gardner–Webb University. Following his first game against Austin Peay, on August 31, 2026, Gardner-Webb announced it had suspended McCullough for an unspecified amount of time following the emergence of allegations related to off-field misconduct. A few days following his suspension, on September 2, 2026, McCullough was terminated from Gardner-Webb as a result of the ongoing investigation.

== Awards ==
LSC Coach of the Year (2023)

GAC Champion (2015), LSC Champion (2023)

Dave Campbell's All-Texas Non-FBS Coach of the Year (2023)

247Sports 30 Under 30 (2023)

AFCA 35 Under 35 (2023)

Dave Campbell's 40 Under 40 (2023)

College Football Network D2 Coach of the Year (2023)

AFCA Good Works Team – Nominated (2025)

== Head coaching record ==
Year	Team	Overall	Conference	Standing	Bowl/playoffs	AFCA^{#}	D2^{°}
East Central Tigers (Great American Conference) (2022)
2022	East Central	9–3	8–3	T–3rd	W Heritage		
East Central:		9–3	8–3				
UT Permian Basin Falcons (Lone Star Conference) (2023–2025)
2023	UT Permian Basin	10–2	8–0	1st	L NCAA Division II First Round	18	17
2024	UT Permian Basin	7–5	6–3	T–3rd	L Heritage		
2025	UT Permian Basin	11–3	7–2	T–2nd	L NCAA Division II Quarterfinal	5	3
UT Permian Basin:		28–10	21–5				
Gardner–Webb Runnin' Bulldogs football (Ohio Valley Conference) (2026)
2026	Gardner–Webb	0–1	0–0				
Gardner-Webb:		0–1	0–0				
Total:		37–14					
National championship Conference title Conference division title or championship game berth
