= Ratliff Stadium =

Football stadium in Odessa, Texas

Coordinates: 31°55′14″N 102°21′53″W

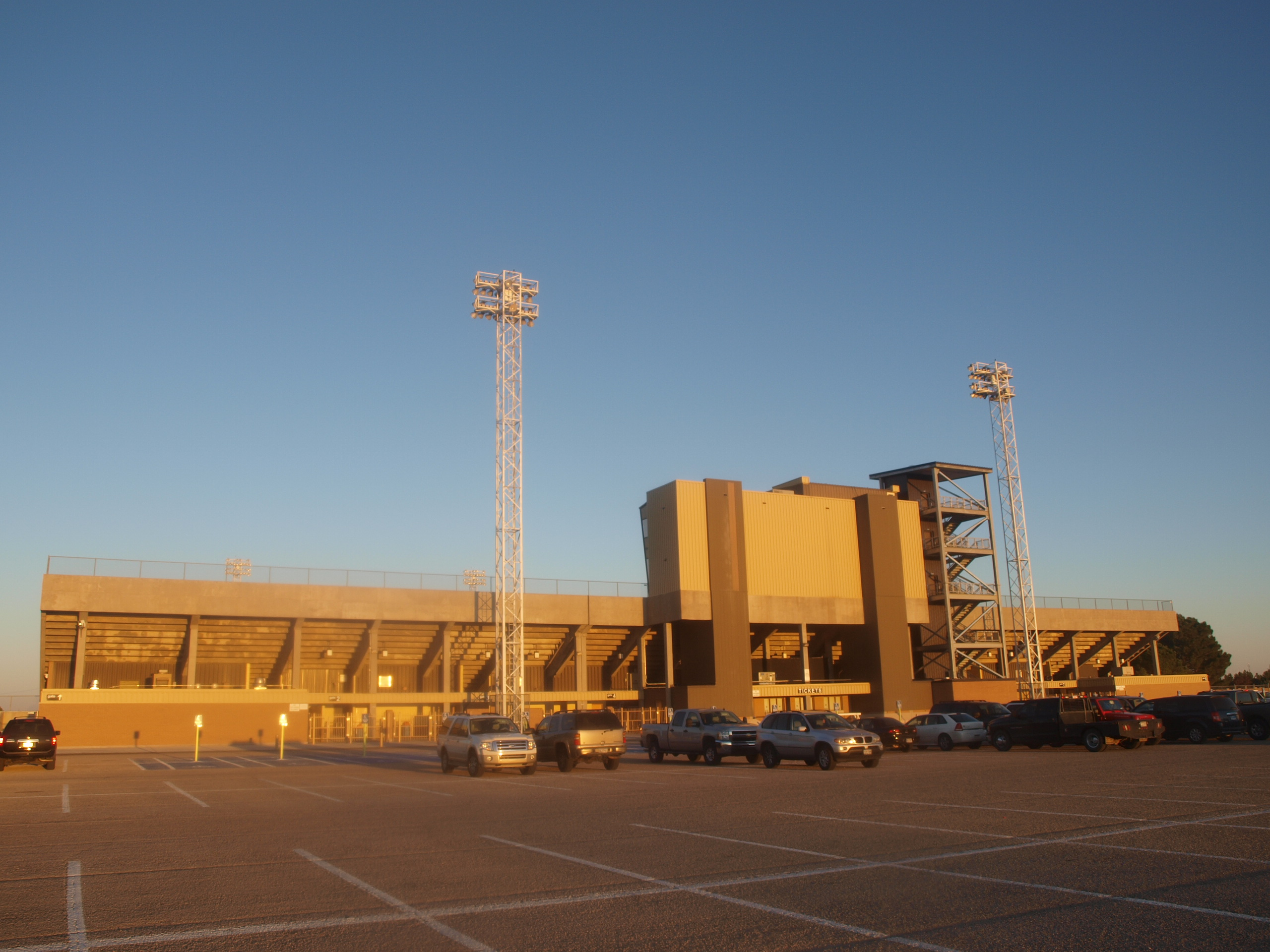
- Interactive map of Ratliff Stadium
- Location: Odessa, Texas
- Owner: Ector County Independent School District
- Capacity: 17,931
- Surface: Matrix Turf

Construction
- Opened: 1982
- Cost: $5.6 million

Tenants
- Permian High Panthers (UIL); Odessa High Bronchos (UIL); UT Permian Basin Falcons (NCAA)

Ratliff Stadium is a stadium in Odessa, Texas. It is primarily used for American football, and is the home field for the city's two public high schools, Odessa and Permian High Schools.

The stadium opened in 1982 and holds 17,931 people (capacity was reduced from the original 19,302 people when additional handicapped seating and accommodations were added in 2008). The stadium was built after the Ector County Independent School District received a donation of land from ranchers Bud and Sallie Ratliff – who’d established their ranch on this land in 1903.

It was the stadium used during the filming of most of the football action in the 2004 movie Friday Night Lights, an adaptation of a 1990 book about Permian High School's 1988 football season.

As of 2015, Ratliff Stadium also serves as the home game venue for the University of Texas of the Permian Basin (UTPB) Falcons Football team.

Other events held at Ratliff Stadium have included track and field, soccer, marching band contests, and graduation ceremonies.
