= 2017 UT Permian Basin Falcons football team =

American college football season

2017 UT Permian Basin Falcons football
- Conference: Lone Star Conference
- Record: 2–9 (1–7 LSC)
- Head coach: Justin Carrigan (2nd season)
- Offensive coordinator: Scott Preston (2nd season)
- Offensive scheme: Air raid
- Co-defensive coordinators: Chris Mineo (2nd season); Jacob Martin (2nd season)
- Base defense: 3–4
- Home stadium: Ratliff Stadium; Grande Communications Stadium

2017 Lone Star Conference football standings
	Conf.			Overall
Team	W		L	W		L
No. 11 Midwestern State $^	8	–	0	10	–	1
No. 1 Texas A&M–Commerce ^	7	–	1	14	–	1
Eastern New Mexico	6	–	2	8	–	2
Tarleton State #	4	–	4	6	–	6
Angelo State #	4	–	4	6	–	5
Western New Mexico	3	–	5	4	–	7
Texas A&M–Kingsville	2	–	6	4	–	7
West Texas A&M	1	–	7	3	–	8
UT Permian Basin	1	–	7	2	–	9
$ – Conference champion; ^ – NCAA Division II playoff participant; # – bowl participant (Tarleton State - Heritage Bowl, Angelo State - C.H.A.M.P.S. Heart of Texas Bowl); Rankings from AFCA poll

The 2017 UT Permian Basin Falcons football team represented University of Texas Permian Basin in the 2017 NCAA Division II football season. They were led by second-year head coach Justin Carrigan. The Falcons played their home games at Ratliff Stadium in Odessa, Texas, with one home game played at Grande Communications Stadium in Midland, and were members of the Lone Star Conference (LSC).

In the program's second season, the team matched its 2–9 record from the previous season and went 1–7 in conference play. The 2017 season marked many firsts for the program. On September 23, the team defeated Western New Mexico 41–32 at Altamirano Stadium in Silver City, New Mexico. The win marked several firsts for the program: first victory over a Division II opponent, first victory over an LSC opponent, and first road win. The team traveled to Division I FCS Lamar, the program's first matchup against a Division I opponent.

== Preseason ==
=== LSC media poll ===
In the LSC's preseason poll, the Falcons were predicted to finish tied-for-last in the conference, though they also received a first-place vote.

== Schedule ==
Texas-Permian Basin announced its 2017 football schedule on March 24, 2017. The schedule consisted of five home and away games, including one neutral site game in the regular season. The Falcons hosted LSC foes Angelo State, Midwestern State, Tarleton State, and Texas A&M-Kingsville and traveled to Eastern New Mexico, Texas A&M-Commerce, West Texas A&M, and Western New Mexico.

The Falcons hosted one of the three non-conference games against Sul Ross from the American Southwest Conference and traveled to Lamar from the Southland Conference, and played Quincy from the Great Lakes Valley Conference in Miami, Oklahoma on the campus of Northeastern Oklahoma A&M College.

Date	Time	Opponent	Site	TV	Result	Attendance
September 2	6:00 p.m	Sul Ross*	Ratliff Stadium; Odessa, TX		L 22–47	12,506
September 9	7:00 p.m.	at Lamar*	Provost Umphrey Stadium; Beaumont, TX	ESPN3	L 6–72	7,072
September 16	3:00 p.m.	at West Texas A&M	Kimbrough Memorial Stadium; Canyon, TX		L 6–17	6,579
September 23	2:30 p.m.	at Western New Mexico	Altamirano Stadium; Silver City, NM		W 41–32	625
September 30	6:00 p.m.	Tarleton State	Ratliff Stadium; Odessa, TX		L 17–32	638
October 7	8:00 p.m.	at Eastern New Mexico	Greyhound Stadium; Portales, NM		L 17–20	2,694
October 14	6:00 p.m.	Texas A&M–Kingsville^{†}	Ratliff Stadium; Odessa, TX		L 21–47	
October 21	1:00 p.m.	vs. Quincy*	Red Robertson Field; Miami, OK		W 42–7	124
October 28	6:00 p.m.	No. 5 Midwestern State	Grande Communications Stadium; Midland, TX		L 8–66	1,154
November 4	4:00 p.m.	at No. 9 Texas A&M–Commerce	Memorial Stadium; Commerce, TX		L 0–52	7,132
November 11	6:00 p.m.	Angelo State	Ratliff Stadium; Odessa, TX		L 24–74	2,213
*Non-conference game; ^{†}Homecoming; Rankings from AFCA Poll released prior to the game; All times are in Central time

== Roster ==
2017 UT Permian Basin Falcons football team roster
Players
Coaches
Offense

Pos.	#	Name	Class
WR	2	Mitchell Leonard	Jr
QB	3	Aaron Swain	So
QB	4	Kameron Mathis	So
WR	5	Kristian Brown	So
QB	6	Michael Myers	Fr
WR	8	Hunter Kliafas	So
WR	9	Kyle McBride	Jr
QB	16	Caden Coots	Jr
WR	17	Ben Galaviz	So
WR	19	Jake Grimm	Fr
RB	28	Brandon Infiesto	So
RB	33	Jordan Williams	So
RB	35	Marquis Simmons	So
RB	38	Jacob Holley	So
TE	42	Phillip Taylor	So
RB	45	Alonso Corral	Fr
QB	49	Brandon Vasquez	So
OL	56	Dominic Assad	So
OL	63	Ivan Pena	Fr
OL	64	Pablo Gutierrez	So
OL	65	D'Andre Wilkerson	Jr
OL	66	Trace Notley	Fr
OL	67	Dylan Ohrt	Fr
OL	68	Erik Nava	Jr
OL	70	Hunter Bowers	So
OL	71	Hector Herrera	So
OL	75	Samuel Robertson	Fr
OL	76	Brontre' Wright	So
OL	77	Ovidio Melendez	Fr
OL	78	Deven Collins	Fr
OL	79	Ryan Wilson	Fr
WR	80	Courtney McMaryion	Fr
WR	81	Jake Anglin	So
WR	82	Baylon Ware	Fr
WR	84	Cale Danielson	Jr
WR	86	Jesse Perez	So
WR	87	Jackson Millar	Fr
WR	89	Mark Villarreal	Fr
WR		Le'Arious Allen	So
WR		Koby Edwards	Fr
OL		Jesus Olivares	Fr
RB		Roosevelt Richmond	So
WR		Adrian Walker	Fr

Defense

Pos.	#	Name	Class
DE	1	Ieti Manu	Sr
DB	7	Justin Nicholls	Jr
DT	10	Marquee Allison	So
CB	11	Alonzo Turner	So
DB	12	Tristen Thompson	Jr
S	15	Montiques Coles	So
S	18	Ryan Baker	So
S	20	Javier Gomez III	So
LB	21	Emilio Solis	So
S	22	Josh Terrell	So
DE	24	John O'Kelley	Fr
S	25	BJ Huitt	So
DE	26	Ashad Guice	Jr
DB	27	Leroy Giles	Fr
DB	29	Diameon Brewer	So
S	30	Xavier Brooks	So
S	31	Tristian Perez	So
DB	32	Martin Brown IV	Fr
LB	34	Alex Parsons	Fr
DB	36	Trent Ward	Fr
OLB	37	Cameron Terrell	Jr
S	39	Frank Kriegbaum	Fr
LB	40	Christ Hoad	So
DB	41	Quinn Tinley	Fr
LB	43	Miquon Mayes	Fr
LB	44	Keegan Gray	So
S	47	Korbin Martinez	So
CB	48	Clifton Holmes	So
DE	50	AJ Fano	Sr
DE	54	Kris Sutton	Jr
DT	69	Jeff Neely	Sr
DE	85	Tori Loud	So
DE	88	Logan Gilliam	So
DT	90	Ray Dinnall-Guerra	So
DT	93	Frank Seiuli	Sr
DE	94	Reagan Havos	So
DT	96	Tyson Carter	Fr
DT	97	Jacob Granado	So
DT	98	La'Daidreain Glasker	Fr
DE	99	Diego Assad	So
DB		Rene Auces	Fr
DB		Marquis Davenport	Jr
S		Jeff Douglas	So
DB		Jack Lacy	So
DT		Jared Thames	Sr

Special teams

Pos.	#	Name	Class
K, P	14	Bailey Giffen	So
P	46	Matt Harper	Fr
LS	51	TJ Soules	Fr
LS	62	Hunter Thiem	Fr
K		Jake Gillespie	Fr

Head coach

- Justin Carrigan

Coordinators/assistant coaches

- Scott Preston
  Offensive coordinator/quarterbacks
- Chris Mineo
  Associate head coach/co-defensive coordinator/defensive line
- Jacob Martin
  Co-defensive coordinator/linebackers
- Carlos Barocio-Leon
  Special teams coordinator/running backs
- Boone Feldt
  Offensive line
- Tyler Scott
  Assistant offensive line
- Dean Garza
  Cornerbacks
- David Gettis
  Wide receivers
- Gene Hudson
  Safeties

Legend

- (C) Team captain
- (S) Suspended
- (I) Ineligible
- Injured
- Redshirt

Roster
Last update: July 14, 2023

== Game summaries ==
=== Sul Ross ===
Sul Ross Lobos at UT Permian Basin Falcons – Game summary

Quarter	1	2	3	4	Total
Lobos	10	8	13	16	47
Falcons	0	10	6	6	22

at Ratliff Stadium, Odessa, Texas

- Date: September 3
- Game time: 6:00 p.m. CDT
- Game weather: Temperature: 95 °F (35 °C) • Weather: Sunny • Wind: SW 10 MPH
- Game attendance: 12,506
- Referee: Robert Newton
- Box score, Recap

Game information
First quarter
- SRSU – Eli Lopez 23-yard field goal, 12:09. Lobos 3–0. Drive: 5 plays, 20 yards, 2:07.
- SRSU – Jeremy Reed 19-yard pass from James Davis (Eli Lopez kick), 0:02. Lobos 10–0. Drive: 5 plays, 73 yards, 2:13.

Second quarter

- SRSU – Baily Giffen tackled in end zone, 6:54. Lobos 12–0.
- SRSU – Byron Jones 36-yard pass from James Davis (pass failed), 5:28. Lobos 18–0. Drive: 2 plays, 38 yards, 1:16.
- UTPB – Kyle McBride 4-yard pass from Michael Myers (Bailey Giffen kick), 3:10. Lobos 18–7. Drive: 5 plays, 78 yards, 2:05.
- UTPB – Bailey Giffen 25-yard field goal, 0:00. Lobos 18–10. Drive: 10 plays, 67 yards, 1:38.

Third quarter

- UTPB – Mitchell Leonard 2-yard pass from Michael Myers (pass failed), 5:38. Lobos 18–16. Drive: 7 plays, 68 yards, 2:50.
- SRSU – Sarkeithian Thomas 38-yard fumble return (Eli Lopez kick), 3:52. Lobos 25–16.
- SRSU – Jeremy Schilhab 2-yard run (pass failed), 0:00. Lobos 31–16. Drive: 7 plays, 57 yards, 2:34.

Fourth quarter

- UTPB – Courtney McMaryion 71-yard pass from Kameron Mathis (kick blocked), 13:34. Lobos 31–22. Drive: 4 plays, 75 yards, 1:26.
- SRSU – James Davis 4-yard run (pass failed), 10:09. Lobos 37–22. Drive: 7 plays, 65 yards, 3:12.
- SRSU – Byron Jones 31-yard pass from James Davis (Eli Lopez kick), 9:47. Lobos 44–22. Drive: 1 play, 31 yards, 0:08.
- SRSU – Eli Lopez 34-yard field goal, 1:22. Lobos 47–22. Drive: 11 plays, 78 yards, 6:55.

Statistics	SRSU	UTPB
First downs	20	17
Total yards	427	414
Rushing yards	82	47
Passing yards	345	367
Turnovers	1	5
Time of possession	36:22	23:38

Team	Category	Player	Statistics
Sul Ross	Passing	James Davis	16/28, 316 yards, 3 TD
Sul Ross	Rushing	Williton Grear	16 rushes, 58 yards
Sul Ross	Receiving	Byron Jones	5 receptions, 135 yards, 2 TD
UT Permian Basin	Passing	Michael Myers	11/19, 164 yards, 2 TD, INT
UT Permian Basin	Rushing	Michael Myers	10 rushes, 40 yards
UT Permian Basin	Receiving	Mitchell Leonard	4 receptions, 77 yards, TD

=== At Lamar ===
UT Permian Basin Falcons at Lamar Cardinals – Game summary

Quarter	1	2	3	4	Total
Falcons	6	0	0	0	6
Cardinals	10	27	14	21	72

at Provost Umphrey Stadium, Beaumont, Texas

- Date: September 9
- Game time: 7:00 p.m. CDT
- Game weather: Temperature: 83 °F (28 °C) • Weather: Sunny • Wind: NE 12 MPH
- Game attendance: 7,072
- Referee: Vidal Jones
- TV: ESPN3
- Box score, Recap

Game information
First quarter
- LU – Elvin Martinez 28-yard field goal, 7:29. Cardinals 3–0. Drive: 13 plays, 73 yards, 3:47.
- UTPB – Caden Coots 3-yard run (kick blocked), 5:36. Falcons 6–3. Drive: 4 plays, 53 yards, 1:41.
- LU – Jarod Wood 18-yard pass from Darrell Colbert Jr. (Elvin Martinez kick), 3:05. Cardinals 10–6. Drive: 10 plays, 77 yards, 2:26.

Second quarter

- LU – Kendrick King 27-yard pass from Darrell Colbert Jr. (Elvin Martinez kick), 14:48. Cardinals 17–6. Drive: 6 plays, 38 yards, 1:35.
- LU – Case Robinson 3-yard pass from Darrell Colbert Jr. (Elvin Martinez kick), 10:18. Cardinals 24–6. Drive: 6 plays, 59 yards, 1:43.
- LU – Darrell Colbert Jr. 27-yard run (kick failed), 6:03. Cardinals 30–6. Drive: 4 plays, 44 yards, 1:21.
- LU – Marcus Daggs 15-yard pass from Darrell Colbert Jr. (Elvin Martinez kick), 1:08. Cardinals 37–6. Drive: 2 plays, 7 yards, 0:34.

Third quarter

- LU – Darrell Colbert Jr. 7-yard run (Elvin Martinez kick), 7:08. Cardinals 44–6. Drive: 8 plays, 65 yards, 2:10.
- LU – Dorian Gaston 9-yard pass from Andrew Allen (Elvin Martinez kick), 0:40. Cardinals 51–6. Drive: 15 plays, 87 yards, 4:43.

Fourth quarter

- LU – Myles Wanza 5-yard run (Elvin Martinez kick), 6:01. Cardinals 58–6. Drive: 6 plays, 37 yards, 3:45.
- LU – Brandon Dabney 60-yard interception return (Elvin Martinez kick), 4:23. Cardinals 65–6.
- LU – Cole Starnes 67-yard run (Elvin Martinez kick), 2:34. Cardinals 72–6. Drive: 1 play, 67 yards, 0:11.

Statistics	UTPB	LU
First downs	9	37
Total yards	141	642
Rushing yards	67	396
Passing yards	74	246
Turnovers	2	1
Time of possession	30:39	29:21

Team	Category	Player	Statistics
UT Permian Basin	Passing	Caden Coots	2/13, 49 yards, INT
UT Permian Basin	Rushing	Alonso Corral	11 rushes, 53 yards
UT Permian Basin	Receiving	Jake Anglin	2 receptions, 49 yards
Lamar	Passing	Darrell Colbert Jr.	18/23, 190 yards, 4 TD
Lamar	Rushing	Kendrick King	15 rushes, 93 yards
Lamar	Receiving	Kendrick King	2 receptions, 49 yards, TD

=== At West Texas A&M ===
UT Permian Basin Falcons at West Texas A&M Buffaloes – Game summary

Quarter	1	2	3	4	Total
Falcons	3	0	0	3	6
Buffaloes	0	7	3	7	17

at Kimbrough Memorial Stadium, Canyon, Texas

- Date: September 16
- Game time: 3:00 p.m. CDT
- Game attendance: 6,579
- Referee: Matt Jones
- Box score, Recap

Game information
First quarter
- UTPB – Bailey Giffen 42-yard field goal, 9:57. Falcons 3–0. Drive: 10 plays, 50 yards, 5:03.

Second quarter

- WT – Jordan Johnson 4-yard run (Alex Schrag kick), 13:26. Buffaloes 7–3. Drive: 5 plays, 40 yards, 2:08.

Third quarter

- WT – Alex Schrag 42-yard field goal, 3:42. Buffaloes 10–3. Drive: 4 plays, -6 yards, 2:02.

Fourth quarter

- UTPB – Bailey Giffen 40-yard field goal, 10:47. Buffaloes 10–6. Drive: 10 plays, 49 yards, 3:27.
- WT – Brandon Blair 10-yard run (Alex Schrag kick), 5:29. Buffaloes 17–6. Drive: 9 plays, 75 yards, 5:11.

Statistics	UTPB	WT
First downs	14	15
Total yards	314	222
Rushing yards	68	82
Passing yards	246	140
Turnovers	2	3
Time of possession	28:34	31:26

Team	Category	Player	Statistics
UT Permian Basin	Passing	Kameron Mathis	16/39, 246 yards, 2 INT
UT Permian Basin	Rushing	Brandon Infiesto	8 rushes, 37 yards
UT Permian Basin	Receiving	Courtney McMaryion	2 receptions, 92 yards
West Texas A&M	Passing	Ben Arbuckle	13/24, 140 yards, 2 INT
West Texas A&M	Rushing	Brandon Blair	6 rushes, 31 yards, TD
West Texas A&M	Receiving	Kailan Noseff	3 receptions, 41 yards

=== At Western New Mexico ===
UT Permian Basin Falcons at Western New Mexico Mustangs – Game summary

Quarter	1	2	3	4	Total
Falcons	0	24	10	7	41
Mustangs	14	0	12	6	32

at Altamirano Stadium, Silver City, New Mexico

- Date: September 23
- Game time: 2:30 p.m. CDT/1:30 p.m. MDT
- Game weather: Temperature: 78 °F (26 °C) • Weather: Clear • Wind: 25-30 MPH
- Game attendance: 625
- Referee: Kenny Kelarek
- Box score, Recap

Game information
First quarter
- WNMU – Evan Beebe 11-yard pass from Javia Hall (Collin Grady kick), 8:47. Mustangs 7–0. Drive: 11 plays, 81 yards, 5:06.
- WNMU – Javia Hall 1-yard run (Collin Grady kick), 1:48. Mustangs 14–0. Drive: 11 plays, 63 yards, 4:52.

Second quarter

- UTPB – Mitchell Leonard 8-yard pass from Kameron Mathis (Bailey Giffen kick), 14:55. Mustangs 14–7. Drive: 7 plays, 50 yards, 1:44.
- UTPB – Bailey Giffen 46-yard field goal, 12:14. Mustangs 14–10. Drive: 8 plays, 41 yards, 2:08.
- UTPB – Christ Hoad 49-yard interception return (Bailey Giffen kick), 9:55. Falcons 17–14.
- UTPB – Kristian Brown 39-yard pass from Kameron Mathis (Bailey Giffen kick), 6:32. Falcons 24–14. Drive: 1 play, 39 yards, 0:09.

Third quarter

- UTPB – Bailey Giffen 25-yard field goal, 12:59. Falcons 27–14. Drive: 4 plays, 7 yards, 1:54.
- WNMU – Elijah Jones 23-yard pass from Javia Hall (kick blocked), 7:41. Falcons 27–20. Drive: 9 plays, 72 yards, 2:44.
- WNMU – D'Angelo Bowie 33-yard pass from Javia Hall (kick blocked), 4:10. Falcons 27–26. Drive: 5 plays, 77 yards, 1:39.
- UTPB – Kameron Mathis 1-yard run (Bailey Giffen kick), 1:05. Falcons 34–26. Drive: 7 plays, 56 yards, 3:02.

Fourth quarter

- WNMU – Sean North 7-yard pass from Javia Hall (pass failed), 6:18. Falcons 34–32. Drive: 5 plays, 53 yards, 1:14.
- UTPB – Brandon Infiesto 24-yard run (Baily Giffen kick), 1:08. Falcons 41–32. Drive: 2 plays, 23 yards, 0:13.

Statistics	UTPB	WNMU
First downs	16	31
Total yards	311	572
Rushing yards	143	76
Passing yards	168	496
Turnovers	1	4
Time of possession	24:32	35:28

Team	Category	Player	Statistics
UT Permian Basin	Passing	Kameron Mathis	12/34, 168 yards, 2 TD, INT
UT Permian Basin	Rushing	Brandon Infiesto	18 rushes, 78 yards, TD
UT Permian Basin	Receiving	Mitchell Leonard	5 receptions, 81 yards, TD
Western New Mexico	Passing	Javia Hill	42/70, 496 yards, 4 TD, 2 INT
Western New Mexico	Rushing	Justin Harris	13 rushes, 38 yards
Western New Mexico	Receiving	D'Angelo Bowie	12 receptions, 158 yards, TD

=== Tarleton State ===
Tarleton State Texans at UT Permian Basin Falcons – Game summary

Quarter	1	2	3	4	Total
Texans	0	6	12	14	32
Falcons	3	0	0	14	17

at Ratliff Stadium, Odessa, Texas

- Date: September 30
- Game time: 6:00 p.m. CDT
- Game attendance: 638
- Referee: Andy Dunkin
- Box score, Recap

Game information
First quarter
- UTPB – Bailey Giffen 51-yard field goal, 10:40. Falcons 3–0. Drive: 4 plays, 5 yards, 1:14.

Second quarter

- TSU – Elliott Hart 98-yard fumble return (kick failed), 8:46. Texans 6–3.

Third quarter

- TSU – Xavier Turner 6-yard run (kick failed), 10:35. Texans 12–3. Drive: 3 plays, 43 yards, 1:23.
- TSU – Jeff Thomas 29-yard pass from Zed Woerner (run failed), 1:52. Texans 18–3. Drive: 4 plays, 31 yards, 1:26.

Fourth quarter

- UTPB – Hunter Kliafas 45-yard pass from Kameron Mathis (Bailey Giffen kick), 14:50. Texans 18–10. Drive: 5 plays, 75 yards, 2:02.
- TSU – Xavier Turner 56-yard run (Sergio Sroka kick), 6:15. Texans 25–10. Drive: 1 play, 56 yards, 0:11.
- UTPB – Kristian Brown 78-yard pass from Kameron Mathis (Bailey Giffen kick), 5:56. Texans 25–17. Drive: 1 play, 78 yards, 0:13.
- TSU – Jeff Thomas 76-yard pass from Zed Woerner (Sergio Sroka kick), 4:55. Texans 32–17. Drive: 2 plays, 79 yards, 0:55.

Statistics	TSU	UTPB
First downs	12	26
Total yards	282	582
Rushing yards	114	284
Passing yards	168	244
Turnovers	1	2
Time of possession	26:02	33:58

Team	Category	Player	Statistics
Tarleton State	Passing	Zed Woerner	11/17, 168 yards, 2 TD
Tarleton State	Rushing	Xavier Turner	12 rushes, 81 yards, 2 TD
Tarleton State	Receiving	Jeff Thomas	6 receptions, 132 yards, 2 TD
UT Permian Basin	Passing	Kameron Mathis	15/33, 244 yards, 2 TD
UT Permian Basin	Rushing	Brandon Infiesto	29 rushes, 128 yards
UT Permian Basin	Receiving	Kristian Brown	2 receptions, 82 yards, TD

=== At Eastern New Mexico ===
UT Permian Basin Falcons at Eastern New Mexico Greyhounds – Game summary

Quarter	1	2	3	4	Total
Falcons	0	0	17	0	17
Greyhounds	7	10	3	0	20

at Greyhound Stadium, Portales, New Mexico

- Date: October 7
- Game time: 8:00 p.m. CDT/7:00 p.m. MDT
- Game attendance: 2,694
- Referee: Sergio Luna
- Box score, Recap

Game information
First quarter
- ENMU – Kamal Cass 13-yard pass from Wyatt Strand (Bailey Hale kick), 11:17. Greyhounds 7–0. Drive: 7 plays, 73 yards, 3:43.

Second quarter

- ENMU – Bailey Hale 30-yard field goal, 2:51. Greyhounds 10–0. Drive: 10 plays, 79 yards, 5:00.
- ENMU – Kamal Cass 58-yard run (Bailey Hale kick), 1:35. Greyhounds 17–0. Drive: 1 play, 58 yards, 0:10.

Third quarter

- UTPB – Kristian Brown 14-yard pass from Kameron Mathis (Bailey Giffen kick), 12:11. Greyhounds 17–7. Drive: 3 plays, 14 yards, 0:14.
- UTPB – Bailey Giffen 21-yard field goal, 8:27. Greyhounds 17–10. Drive: 7 plays, 33 yards, 2:07.
- ENMU – Bailey Hale 43-yard field goal, 4:54. Greyhounds 20–10. Drive: 7 plays, 40 yards, 3:24.
- UTPB – Marquee Allison 1-yard run (Bailey Giffen kick), 4:01. Greyhounds 20–17. Drive: 3 plays, 75 yards, 0:53.

Fourth quarter

- No scoring plays

Statistics	UTPB	ENMU
First downs	9	19
Total yards	224	468
Rushing yards	11	375
Passing yards	213	93
Turnovers	0	3
Time of possession	21:30	38:30

Team	Category	Player	Statistics
UT Permian Basin	Passing	Kameron Mathis	12/33, 213 yards, TD
UT Permian Basin	Rushing	Brandon Infiesto	10 rushes, 25 yards
UT Permian Basin	Receiving	Mitchell Leonard	5 receptions, 94 yards
Eastern New Mexico	Passing	Wyatt Strand	5/10, 93 yards, TD, INT
Eastern New Mexico	Rushing	Kamel Cass	30 rushes, 154 yards, TD
Eastern New Mexico	Receiving	Kamal Cass	2 receptions, 54 yards, TD

=== Texas A&M–Kingsville ===
Texas A&M–Kingsville Javelinas at UT Permian Basin Falcons – Game summary

Quarter	1	2	3	4	Total
Javelinas	12	14	14	7	47
Falcons	0	0	14	7	21

at Ratliff Stadium, Odessa, Texas

- Date: October 14
- Game time: 6:00 p.m. CDT
- Box score, Recap

Game information
First quarter
- TAMUK – Julio de la Garza 40-yard field goal, 10:04. Javelinas 3–0. Drive: 9 plays, 28 yards, 3:27.
- TAMUK – Micheal Myers sacked in end zone, 9:37. Javelinas 5–0.
- TAMUK – Jeff Carr 3-yard run (Julio de la Garza kick), 5:48. Javelinas 12–0. Drive: 8 plays, 37 yards, 3:40.

Second quarter

- TAMUK – Nick Pelrean 6-yard run (Julio de la Garza kick), 5:06. Javelinas 19–0. Drive: 7 plays, 85 yards, 3:44.
- TAMUK – Jordan Thomas 27-yard pass from Cade Dyal (Julio de la Garza kick), 1:00. Javelinas 26–0. Drive: 3 plays, 49 yards, 1:09.

Third quarter

- TAMUK – Nick Pelrean 35-yard run (Julio de la Garza kick), 13:04. Javelinas 33–0. Drive: 4 plays, 80 yards, 1:52.
- UTPB – Marquee Allison 3-yard pass from Kameron Mathis (Bailey Giffen kick), 4:07. Javelinas 33–7. Drive: 5 plays, 63 yards, 1:52.
- TAMUK – Marcus Younger 47-yard pass from Cade Dyal (Julio de la Garza kick), 2:31. Javelinas 40–7. Drive: 2 plays, 48 yards, 1:19.
- UTPB – Courtney McMaryion 13-yard pass from Kameron Mathis (Bailey Giffen kick), 0:03. Javelinas 40–14. Drive: 8 plays, 83 yards, 2:23.

Fourth quarter

- UTPB – Mitchell Leonard 8-yard pass from Kameron Mathis (Bailey Giffen kick), 8:07. Javelinas 40–21. Drive: 3 plays, 34 yards, 1:04.
- TAMUK – Jordan Thomas 55-yard pass from Cade Dyal (Julio de la Garza kick), 6:50. Javelinas 47–21. Drive: 3 plays, 67 yards, 1:15.

Statistics	TAMUK	UTPB
First downs	27	18
Total yards	499	326
Rushing yards	132	11
Passing yards	367	315
Turnovers	0	2
Time of possession	36:02	23:58

Team	Category	Player	Statistics
Texas A&M–Kingsville	Passing	Cade Dyal	28/40, 367 yards, 3 TD
Texas A&M–Kingsville	Rushing	Nick Pelrean	16 rushes, 94 yards, 2 TD
Texas A&M–Kingsville	Receiving	Jordan Thomas	6 receptions, 121 yards, 2 TD
UT Permian Basin	Passing	Kameron Mathis	14/21, 216 yards, 3 TD, INT
UT Permian Basin	Rushing	Brandon Infiesto	9 rushes, 30 yards
UT Permian Basin	Receiving	Mitchell Leonard	9 receptions, 174 yards, TD

=== Vs. Quincy ===
Quincy Hawks vs. UT Permian Basin Falcons – Game summary

Quarter	1	2	3	4	Total
Hawks	7	0	0	0	7
Falcons	7	16	13	6	42

at Red Robertson Field, Miami, Oklahoma

- Date: October 21
- Game time: 1:00 p.m. CDT
- Game weather: Temperature: 79 °F (26 °C) • Weather: Partly cloudy • Wind: S 17 MPH
- Game attendance: 124
- Referee: Gary Brammer
- Box score, Recap

Game information
First quarter
- UTPB – Brandon Infiesto 66-yard run (Bailey Giffen kick), 14:26. Falcons 7–0. Drive: 2 plays, 75 yards, 0:34.
- QU – Andrew Rund 7-yard run (Michael Klotz kick), 11:02. Tied 7–7. Drive: 7 plays, 44 yards, 3:24.

Second quarter

- UTPB – Bailey Giffen 55-yard field goal, 14:55. Falcons 10–7. Drive: 11 plays, 58 yards, 4:02.
- UTPB – Bailey Giffen 40-yard field goal, 11:50. Falcons 13–7. Drive: 7 plays, 39 yards, 1:22.
- UTPB – Kameron Mathis 1-yard run (Bailey Giffen kick), 3:23. Falcons 20–7. Drive: 10 plays, 71 yards, 3:02.
- UTPB – Bailey Giffen 50-yard field goal, 0:00. Falcons 23–7. Drive: 2 plays, 0 yards, 0:09.

Third quarter

- UTPB – Marquis Simmons 1-yard run (kick blocked), 10:19. Falcons 29–7. Drive: 7 plays, 65 yards, 2:39.
- UTPB – Brandon Infiesto 14-yard run (Bailey Giffen kick), 1:54. Falcons 36–7. Drive: 9 plays, 92 yards, 3:22.

Fourth quarter

- UTPB – Kristian Brown 59-yard pass from Kameron Mathis (kick blocked), 14:51. Falcons 42–7. Drive: 3 plays, 62 yards, 1:03.

Statistics	QU	UTPB
First downs	10	23
Total yards	229	551
Rushing yards	94	373
Passing yards	135	178
Turnovers	3	1
Time of possession	28:40	31:20

Team	Category	Player	Statistics
Quincy	Passing	Andrew Rund	11/20, 109 yards
Quincy	Rushing	Andrew Rund	13 rushes, 71 yards, TD
Quincy	Receiving	Kody Wood	1 reception, 32 yards
UT Permian Basin	Passing	Kameron Mathis	7/15, 159 yards, TD
UT Permian Basin	Rushing	Brandon Infiesto	18 rushes, 175 yards, 2 TD
UT Permian Basin	Receiving	Kristian Brown	1 reception, 59 yards, TD

=== No. 5 Midwestern State ===
No. 5 Midwestern State Mustangs at UT Permian Basin Falcons – Game summary

Quarter	1	2	3	4	Total
No. 5 Mustangs	24	14	14	14	66
Falcons	0	6	2	0	8

at Grande Communications Stadium, Midland, Texas

- Date: October 28
- Game time: 6:00 p.m. CDT
- Game weather: Temperature: 58 °F (14 °C) • Weather: Sunny
- Game attendance: 1,154
- Referee: Jarvis Walker
- Box score, Recap

Game information
First quarter
- MSU – Jaron Imbriani 29-yard field goal, 10:56. Mustangs 3–0. Drive: 8 plays, 63 yards, 4:04.
- MSU – DeAndre Black 94-yard pass from Layton Rabb (Jaron Imbriani kick), 3:49. Mustangs 10–0. Drive: 3 plays, 96 yards, 1:35.
- MSU – Tyrique Edwards 4-yard pass from Layton Rabb (Jaron Imbriani kick), 2:32. Mustangs 17–0. Drive: 1 play, 4 yards, 0:05.
- MSU – Vincent Johnson 62-yard run (Jaron Imbriani kick), 1:05. Mustangs 24–0. Drive: 2 plays, 73 yards, 0:26.

Second quarter

- MSU – Tyrique Edwards 13-yard pass from Layton Rabb (Jaron Imbriani kick), 10:48. Mustangs 31–0. Drive: 9 plays, 49 yards, 3:29.
- UTPB – Marquis Simmons 27-yard run (kick failed), 8:03. Mustangs 31–6. Drive: 8 plays, 72 yards, 2:42.
- MSU – DeAndre Black 42-yard pass from Layton Rabb (Jaron Imbriani kick), 6:23. Mustangs 38–6. Drive: 5 plays, 72 yards, 1:34.

Third quarter

- UTPB – Vincent Johnson tackled in end zone, 11:29. Mustangs 38–8.
- MSU – Tyler Milliken 18-yard pass from Layton Rabb (Jaron Imbriani kick), 10:53. Mustangs 45–8. Drive: 2 plays, 41 yards, 0:28.
- MSU – Tyler Milliken 45-yard pass from Javin Kilgo (Jaron Imbriani kick), 7:43. Mustangs 52–8. Drive: 3 plays, 79 yards, 1:21.

Fourth quarter

- MSU – Nicholas Gabriel 10-yard run (Jaron Imbriani kick), 10:18. Mustangs 59–8. Drive: 8 plays, 74 yards, 3:42.
- MSU – Tyler Milliken 45-yard pass from Hagen Hutchinson (Jaron Imbriani kick), 4:39. Mustangs 66–8. Drive: 5 plays, 84 yards, 2:42.

Statistics	MSU	UTPB
First downs	28	20
Total yards	667	367
Rushing yards	243	253
Passing yards	424	114
Turnovers	0	4
Time of possession	26:47	33:13

Team	Category	Player	Statistics
Midwestern State	Passing	Layton Rabb	16/23, 280 yards, 5 TD
Midwestern State	Rushing	Adrian Seales	9 rushes, 87 yards
Midwestern State	Receiving	DeAndre Black	7 receptions, 177 yards, 2 TD
UT Permian Basin	Passing	Kameron Mathis	16/32, 114 yards, 3 INT
UT Permian Basin	Rushing	Marquis Simmons	28 rushes, 133 yards, TD
UT Permian Basin	Receiving	Mitchell Leonard	6 receptions, 45 yards

=== At No. 9 Texas A&M–Commerce ===
UT Permian Basin Falcons at No. 9 Texas A&M–Commerce Lions – Game summary

Quarter	1	2	3	4	Total
Falcons	0	0	0	0	0
No. 9 Lions	21	14	14	3	52

at Memorial Stadium, Commerce, Texas

- Date: October 1
- Game time: 4:00 p.m. CDT
- Game weather: Temperature: 83 °F (28 °C) • Weather: Mostly cloudy • Wind: SSW 14 MPH
- Game attendance: 7,132
- Referee: Brad Frisby
- Box score, Recap

Game information

First quarter

- TAMUC – Gabriel Rodriguez 1-yard run (Kristov Martinez kick), 10:11. Lions 7–0. Drive: 10 plays, 75 yards, 4:49.
- TAMUC – Austin Jordan 1-yard pass from Luis Perez (Kristov Martinez kick), 7:37. Lions 14–0. Drive: 4 plays, 40 yards, 1:27.
- TAMUC – Vincent Hobbs 74-yard pass from Luis Perez (Kristov Martinez kick), 6:29. Lions 21–0. Drive: 1 play, 74 yards, 0:12.

Second quarter

- TAMUC – Buck Wilson 18-yard pass from Luis Perez (Kristov Martinez kick), 7:04. Lions 28–0. Drive: 9 plays, 91 yards, 3:24.
- TAMUC – Vincent Hobbs 30-yard pass from Luis Perez (Kristov Martinez kick), 1:25. Lions 35–0. Drive: 3 plays, 44 yards, 0:20.

Third quarter

- TAMUC – D'Arthur Cowan 2-yard pass from Luis Perez (Kristov Martinez kick), 6:49. Lions 42–0. Drive: 9 plays, 87 yards, 4:32.
- TAMUC – Richard Whitaker 14-yard run (Kristov Martinez kick), 3:18. Lions 49–0. Drive: 5 plays, 54 yards, 1:30.

Fourth quarter

- TAMUC – Kristov Martinez 28-yard field goal, 9:10. Lions 52–0. Drive: 4 plays, -2 yards, 1:14.

Statistics	UTPB	TAMUC
First downs	11	33
Total yards	125	583
Rushing yards	52	202
Passing yards	73	381
Turnovers	0	1
Time of possession	31:21	28:39

Team	Category	Player	Statistics
UT Permian Basin	Passing	Kameron Mathis	7/22, 54 yards
UT Permian Basin	Rushing	Jordan Williams	5 rushes, 28 yards
UT Permian Basin	Receiving	Jake Anglin	3 receptions, 33 yards
Texas A&M–Commerce	Passing	Luis Perez	26/34, 301 yards, 4 TD
Texas A&M–Commerce	Rushing	Carandal Hale	6 rushes, 84 yards
Texas A&M–Commerce	Receiving	Vincent Hobbs	6 receptions, 144 yards, 2 TD

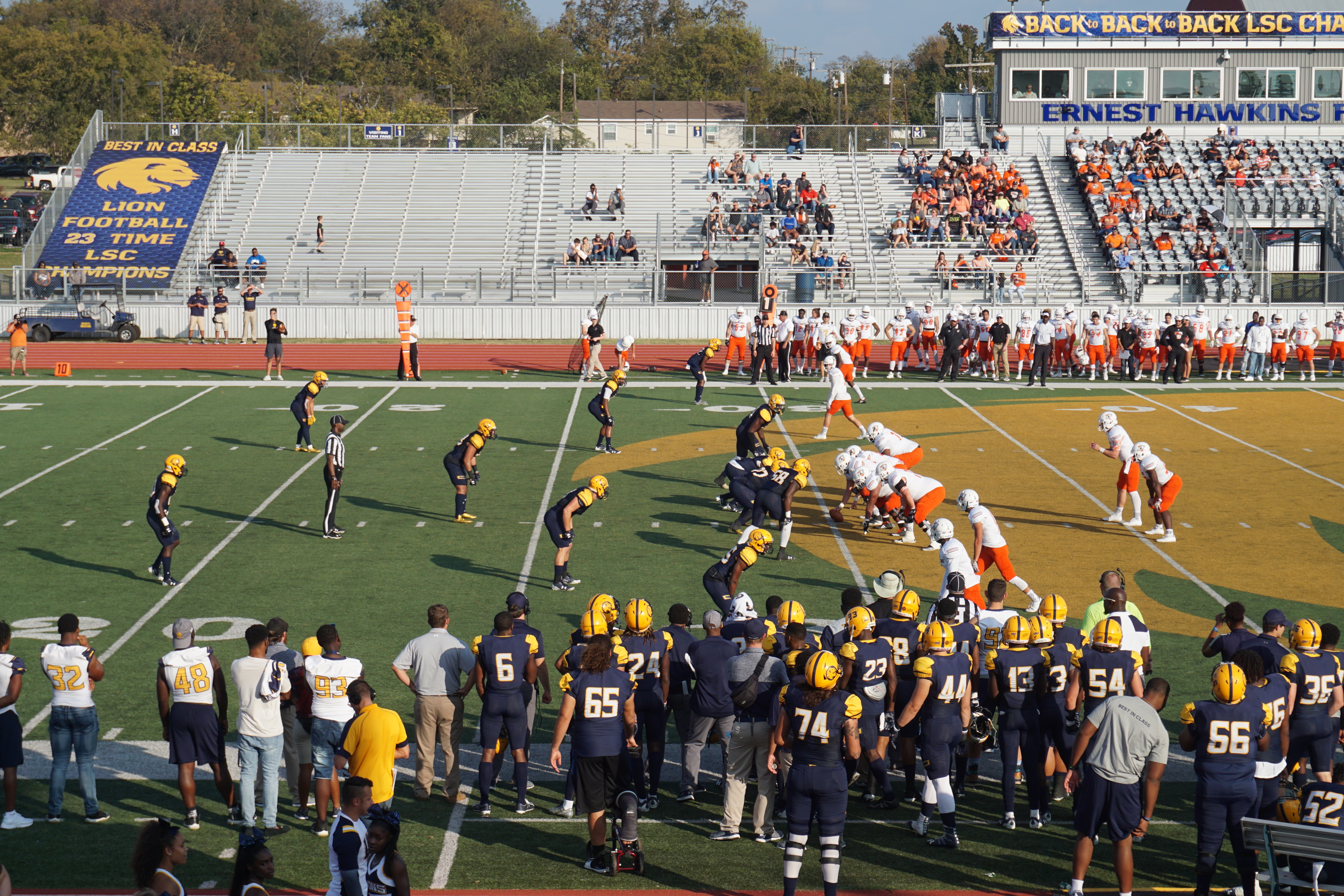
The UT Permian Basin Falcons playing against the Texas A&M–Commerce Lions

=== Angelo State ===
Angelo State Rams at UT Permian Basin Falcons – Game summary

Quarter	1	2	3	4	Total
Rams	19	17	28	10	74
Falcons	7	10	0	7	24

at Ratliff Stadium, Odessa, Texas

- Date: November 11
- Game time: 6:00 p.m. CST
- Game attendance: 2,213
- Referee: Bryant Thompson
- Box score, Recap

Game information
First quarter
- ASU – Justin Jackson 81-yard interception return (Connor Flanigan kick), 12:32. Rams 7–0.
- UTPB – Kristian Brown 28-yard pass from Kameron Mathis (Bailey Giffen kick), 9:22. Tied 7–7. Drive: 9 plays, 75 yards, 3:09.
- ASU – Jake Faber 2-yard run (kick blocked), 4:49. Rams 13–7. Drive: 7 plays, 80 yards, 1:52.
- ASU – Keke Chism 17-yard pass from Kameron Mathis (kick failed), 1:08. Rams 19–7. Drive: 7 plays, 52 yards, 2:05.

Second quarter

- ASU – Josh Stevens 38-yard run (Connor Flanigan kick), 10:32. Rams 26–7. Drive: 8 plays, 80 yards, 2:30.
- ASU – Hunter Kyle 22-yard interception return (Connor Flanigan kick), 9:49. Rams 33–7.
- UTPB – Jake Anglin 2-yard pass from Kameron Mathis (Bailey Giffen kick), 3:27. Rams 33–14. Drive: 5 plays, 50 yards, 1:54.
- ASU – Connor Flanigan 36-yard field goal, 1:47. Rams 36–14. Drive: 7 plays, 24 yards, 1:40.
- UTPB – Bailey Giffen 22-yard field goal, 0:00. Rams 36–17. Drive: 12 plays, 70 yards, 1:39.

Third quarter

- ASU – Lawson Ayo 20-yard pass from Jake Faber (Connor Flanigan kick), 13:47. Rams 43–17. Drive: 4 plays, 56 yards, 1:13.
- ASU – Jalyn Judkins 44-yard pass from Jake Faber (Connor Flanigan kick), 9:26. Rams 50–17. Drive: 4 plays, 48 yards, 1:20.
- ASU – Josh Stevens 1-yard run (Connor Flanigan kick), 6:44. Rams 57–17. Drive: 6 plays, 67 yards, 2:07.
- ASU – Donavyn Jackson 38-yard interception return (Connor Flanigan kick), 0:46. Rams 64–17.

Fourth quarter

- UTPB – Brandon Infiesto 24-yard run (Bailey Giffen kick), 13:00. Rams 64–24. Drive: 8 plays, 67 yards, 2:36.
- ASU – Josh Stevens 49-yard run (Connor Flannigan kick), 11:16. Rams 71–24. Drive: 6 plays, 70 yards, 1:36.
- ASU – Connor Flanigan 25-yard field goal, 2:04. Rams 74–24. Drive: 12 plays, 75 yards, 7:46.

Statistics	ASU	UTPB
First downs	28	26
Total yards	560	462
Rushing yards	239	232
Passing yards	321	230
Turnovers	1	3
Time of possession	26:51	33:09

Team	Category	Player	Statistics
Angelo State	Passing	Jake Faber	18/32, 296 yards, 3 TD, INT
Angelo State	Rushing	Josh Stevens	18 rushes, 159 yards, 3 TD
Angelo State	Receiving	Keke Chism	4 receptions, 66 yards, TD
UT Permian Basin	Passing	Kameron Mathis	30/52, 227 yards, 2 TD, 2 INT
UT Permian Basin	Rushing	Brandon Infiesto	20 rushes, 163 yards, TD
UT Permian Basin	Receiving	Kristian Brown	8 receptions, 94 yards, TD

== Statistics ==
=== Scoring ===
Scores against non-conference opponents

	1	2	3	4	Total
Opponents	27	35	27	37	126
UT Permian Basin	13	26	19	12	70

Scores against the Lone Star Conference

	1	2	3	4	Total
Opponents	97	82	100	61	340
UT Permian Basin	13	40	43	38	134

Scores against all opponents

	1	2	3	4	Total
Opponents	124	117	127	98	466
UT Permian Basin	26	66	62	50	204
