= Kelley Lee (American football) =

American football coach (born c. 1977)

Biographical details
- Born: c. 1977 (age 48–49); Truth or Consequences, New Mexico, U.S.
- Education: Western New Mexico University (2000)

Playing career
- 1996–1999: Western New Mexico
- Position: Quarterback

Coaching career (HC unless noted)
- 2002–2003: Eastern New Mexico (GA)
- 2006–2007: New Mexico Military (OC)
- 2008: Midland (OC)
- 2009–2011: Valencia HS (NM)
- 2012–2016: Eastern New Mexico (OC)
- 2017–2020: Eastern New Mexico
- 2021–2022: Veterans Memorial Early College HS (TX)
- 2023–2025: Eastern New Mexico

Head coaching record
- Overall: 32–34 (college); 46–23 (high school)
- Bowls: 1–0 (college)
- Tournaments: 4–5 (high school)

Kelley Lee (born c. 1977) is an American college football coach. He was the head coach for Valencia High School from 2009 to 2011 and Veterans Memorial Early College High School from 2021 to 2022, and Eastern New Mexico University from 2017 to 2020 and 2023 to 2025. He also coached for NMMI and Midland. He played college football for Western New Mexico as a quarterback.

== Head coaching record ==
=== College ===
Year	Team	Overall	Conference	Standing	Bowl/playoffs
Eastern New Mexico Greyhounds (Lone Star Conference) (2017–2021)
2017	Eastern New Mexico	8–2	6–2	3rd	
2018	Eastern New Mexico	5–6	4–4	T–4th	
2019	Eastern New Mexico	8–4	4–4	5th	W Heritage
2020–21	No team—COVID-19				
Eastern New Mexico Greyhounds (Lone Star Conference) (2023–2025)
2023	Eastern New Mexico	5–6	2–6	T–6th	
2024	Eastern New Mexico	3–8	1–8	9th	
2025	Eastern New Mexico	3–8	3–6	T–7th	
Eastern New Mexico:		32–34	20–30		
Total:		32–34			

=== High school ===
Year	Team	Overall	Conference	Standing	Bowl/playoffs
Valencia Jaguars () (2009–2011)
2009	Valencia	6–5	1–1	2nd	
2010	Valencia	9–4	3–2	3rd	
2011	Valencia	11–1	5–0	1st	
Valencia:		26–9	9–3		
Veterans Memorial Early College Chargers () (2021–2022)
2021	Veterans Memorial Early College	7–4	7–2	T–2nd	
2022	Veterans Memorial Early College	10–3	5–1	T–1st	
Veterans Memorial Early College:		17–7	12–3		
Total:		46–23			
National championship Conference title Conference division title or championship game berth
