= 2017 Western New Mexico Mustangs football team =

American college football season

2017 Western New Mexico Mustangs football
- Conference: Lone Star Conference
- Record: 4–7 (3–5 LSC)
- Head coach: Adam Clark (8th season)
- Offensive coordinator: Chris Buckner (2nd season)
- Offensive scheme: Air raid
- Base defense: 3–4
- Home stadium: Altamirano Stadium

2017 Lone Star Conference football standings
	Conf.			Overall
Team	W		L	W		L
No. 11 Midwestern State $^	8	–	0	10	–	1
No. 1 Texas A&M–Commerce ^	7	–	1	14	–	1
Eastern New Mexico	6	–	2	8	–	2
Tarleton State #	4	–	4	6	–	6
Angelo State #	4	–	4	6	–	5
Western New Mexico	3	–	5	4	–	7
Texas A&M–Kingsville	2	–	6	4	–	7
West Texas A&M	1	–	7	3	–	8
UT Permian Basin	1	–	7	2	–	9
$ – Conference champion; ^ – NCAA Division II playoff participant; # – bowl participant (Tarleton State - Heritage Bowl, Angelo State - C.H.A.M.P.S. Heart of Texas Bowl); Rankings from AFCA poll

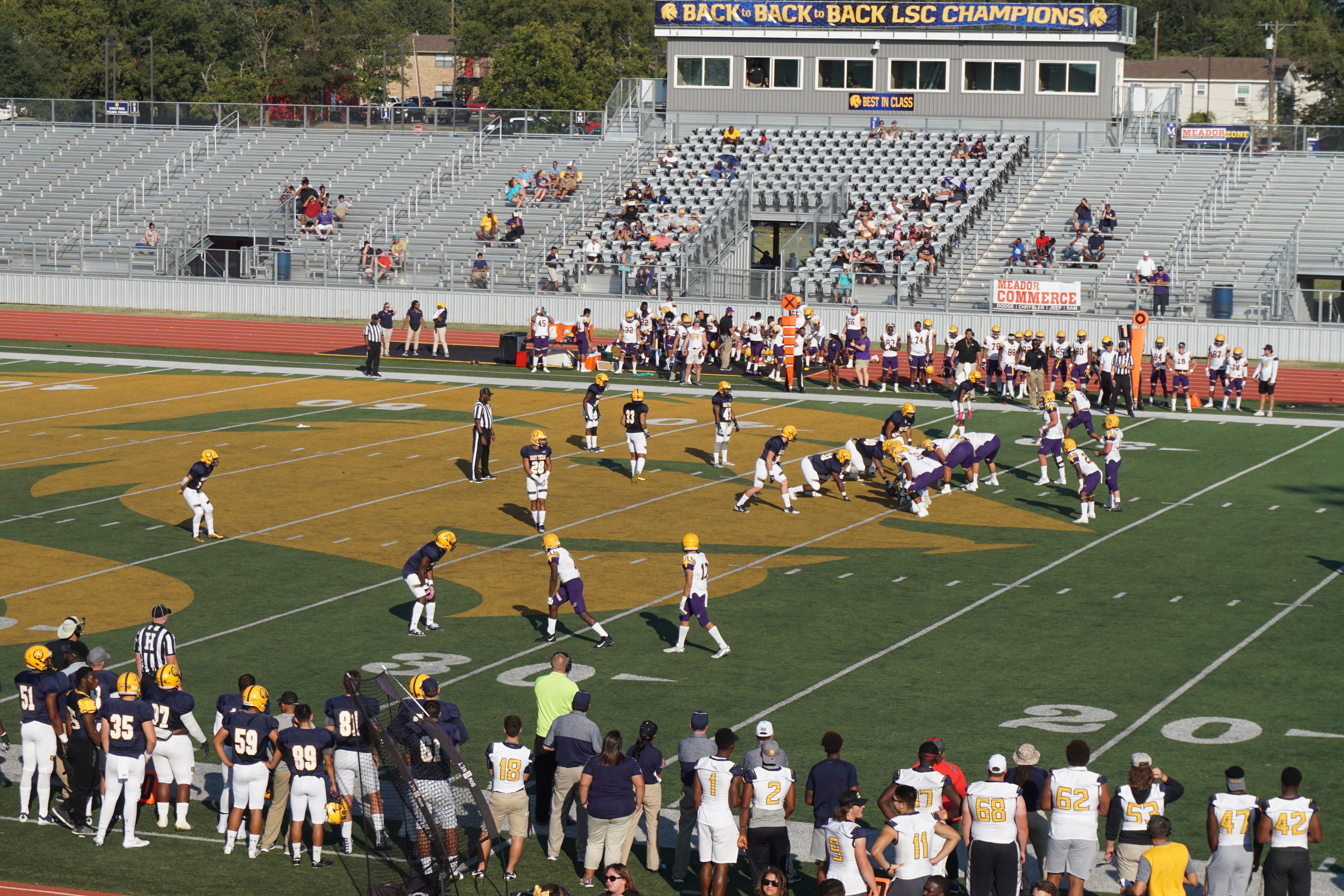
Western New Mexico in action against the Texas A&M–Commerce Lions

The 2017 Western New Mexico Mustangs football team represented Western New Mexico University (WNMU) in the 2017 NCAA Division II football season. They were led by eighth-year head coach Adam Clark. The Mustangs played their home games at Altamirano Stadium and were members of the Lone Star Conference.

Following the season, Clark announced that he would be stepping down as the program's head coach. Clark finished his tenure at WNMU with an overall record of 33–54 through eight seasons.

== Preseason ==
=== LSC media poll ===
The LSC media poll was released on August 22, 2017. The Mustangs were predicted to finish tied for last in the conference.

== Schedule ==
Western New Mexico announced its 2017 football schedule on January 23, 2017. The schedule consisted of six home and five away games in the regular season. The Mustangs hosted LSC foes Eastern New Mexico, Tarleton State, Texas A&M–Kingsville, and UT Permian Basin and traveled to Angelo State, Midwestern State, Texas A&M–Commerce, and West Texas A&M.

The Mustangs hosted two of its three non-conference games against Fort Lewis from the Rocky Mountain Athletic Conference and Western Oregon, and traveled to San Diego from the Pioneer Football League.

Date	Time	Opponent	Site	Result	Attendance
September 2	3:00 p.m	at San Diego*	Torero Stadium; San Diego, CA	L 20–34	2,247
September 9	12:00 p.m.	Eastern New Mexico	Altamirano Stadium; Silver City, NM	L 34–37	789
September 16	12:00 p.m.	Western Oregon*	Altamirano Stadium; Silver City, NM	L 21–58	238
September 23	1:30 p.m.	UT Permian Basin^{†}	Altamirano Stadium; Silver City, NM	L 32–41	625
September 30	6:00 p.m.	at No. 12 Midwestern State	Memorial Stadium; Wichita Falls, TX	L 24–35	8,737
October 7	12:00 p.m.	Tarleton State	Altamirano Stadium; Silver City, NM	W 38–25	578
October 14	3:00 p.m.	at No. 11 Texas A&M–Commerce	Memorial Stadium; Commerce, TX	L 3–52	8,675
October 21	12:00 p.m.	Fort Lewis*	Altamirano Stadium; Silver City, NM	W 20–17	198
October 28	5:00 p.m.	at Angelo State	LeGrand Stadium; San Angelo, TX	L 7–44	2,409
November 4	12:00 p.m.	Texas A&M–Kingsville	Altamirano Stadium; Silver City, NM	W 35–23	475
November 11	12:00 p.m.	at West Texas A&M	Kimbrough Memorial Stadium; Canyon, TX	W 21–17	5,487
*Non-conference game; ^{†}Homecoming; Rankings from Coaches' Poll released prior to the game; All times are in Mountain time

== Game summaries ==
=== At San Diego ===
	1	2	3	4	Total
Mustangs	13	0	0	7	20
Toreros	10	7	10	7	34

Statistics	WNMU	USD
First downs	24	14
Total yards	516	339
Rushing yards	52	152
Passing yards	464	187
Turnovers	5	1
Time of possession	30:38	29:22

Team	Category	Player	Statistics
Western New Mexico	Passing	Javia Hall	39/62, 464 yards, 3 TD
Western New Mexico	Rushing	Justin Harris	13 rushes, 63 yards
Western New Mexico	Receiving	D'Angelo Bowie	19 receptions, 263 yards, 2 TD
San Diego	Passing	Anthony Lawrence	15/28, 187 yards, 2 TD
San Diego	Rushing	Emilio Martinez	17 rushes, 96 yards, TD
San Diego	Receiving	Justin Priest	4 receptions, 95 yards, TD

=== Eastern New Mexico ===
	1	2	3	4	Total
Greyhounds	14	3	7	13	37
Mustangs	7	7	13	7	34

Statistics	ENMU	WNMU
First downs	21	21
Total yards	404	444
Rushing yards	367	26
Passing yards	37	418
Turnovers	1	5
Time of possession	35:05	24:55

Team	Category	Player	Statistics
Eastern New Mexico	Passing	Wyatt Strand	4/9, 37 yards
Eastern New Mexico	Rushing	Tayshaun Gary	9 rushes, 113 yards
Eastern New Mexico	Receiving	Russell Montoya	2 receptions, 26 yards
Western New Mexico	Passing	Javia Hall	21/41, 418 yards, 4 TD, 2 INT
Western New Mexico	Rushing	DeAndre Williams	9 rushes, 17 yards
Western New Mexico	Receiving	Evan Beebe	5 receptions, 125 yards, TD

=== Western Oregon ===
	1	2	3	4	Total
Wolves	0	33	7	18	58
Mustangs	0	7	14	0	21

Statistics	WOU	WNMU
First downs	16	22
Total yards	436	367
Rushing yards	92	92
Passing yards	344	275
Turnovers	1	6
Time of possession	29:44	30:16

Team	Category	Player	Statistics
Western Oregon	Passing	Nick Duckworth	17/24, 293 yards, 4 TD
Western Oregon	Rushing	Torreahno Sweet	8 rushes, 71 yards, TD
Western Oregon	Receiving	Paul Revis	10 receptions, 133 yards, TD
Western New Mexico	Passing	Javia Hall	22/45, 275 yards, 2 TD, 5 INT
Western New Mexico	Rushing	Justin Harris	10 rushes, 81 yards, TD
Western New Mexico	Receiving	D'Angelo Bowie	6 receptions, 108 yards, 2 TD

=== UT Permian Basin ===
	1	2	3	4	Total
Falcons	0	24	10	7	41
Mustangs	14	0	12	6	32

Statistics	UTPB	WNMU
First downs	16	31
Total yards	311	572
Rushing yards	143	76
Passing yards	168	496
Turnovers	1	4
Time of possession	24:32	35:28

Team	Category	Player	Statistics
UT Permian Basin	Passing	Kameron Mathis	12/34, 168 yards, 2 TD, INT
UT Permian Basin	Rushing	Brandon Infiesto	18 rushes, 78 yards, TD
UT Permian Basin	Receiving	Mitchell Leonard	5 receptions, 81 yards, TD
Western New Mexico	Passing	Javia Hill	42/70, 496 yards, 4 TD, 2 INT
Western New Mexico	Rushing	Justin Harris	13 rushes, 38 yards
Western New Mexico	Receiving	D'Angelo Bowie	12 receptions, 158 yards, TD

=== At No. 12 Midwestern State ===
	1	2	3	4	Total
WNMU Mustangs	14	3	7	0	24
No. 12 MSU Mustangs	7	7	14	7	35

Statistics	WNMU	MSU
First downs	28	23
Total yards	467	432
Rushing yards	139	106
Passing yards	328	326
Turnovers	1	0
Time of possession	36:25	23:35

Team	Category	Player	Statistics
Western New Mexico	Passing	Javia Hall	28/41, 328 yards, 2 TD
Western New Mexico	Rushing	Justin Harris	18 rushes, 109 yards, TD
Western New Mexico	Receiving	Elijah Jones	5 receptions, 73 yards
Midwestern State	Passing	Layton Rabb	20/31, 326 yards, 2 TD
Midwestern State	Rushing	Adrian Seales	19 rushes, 86 yards, TD
Midwestern State	Receiving	D. J. Myers	4 receptions, 130 yards, TD

=== Tarleton State ===
	1	2	3	4	Total
Texans	0	3	0	22	25
Mustangs	14	0	3	21	38

Statistics	TSU	WNMU
First downs	17	18
Total yards	259	324
Rushing yards	27	135
Passing yards	232	189
Turnovers	2	1
Time of possession	28:34	31:26

Team	Category	Player	Statistics
Tarleton State	Passing	Zed Woerner	20/35, 232 yards, TD, 2 INT
Tarleton State	Rushing	Xavier Turner	8 rushes, 28 yards
Tarleton State	Receiving	Del'Michael High	9 receptions, 121 yards, TD
Western New Mexico	Passing	Javia Hall	18/40, 183 yards, 2 TD, INT
Western New Mexico	Rushing	Justin Harris	16 rushes, 92 yards, TD
Western New Mexico	Receiving	Elijah Jones	4 receptions, 67 yards, TD

=== At No. 11 Texas A&M–Commerce ===
	1	2	3	4	Total
Mustangs	0	3	0	0	3
No. 11 Lions	17	0	21	14	52

Statistics	WNMU	TAMUC
First downs	14	15
Total yards	237	430
Rushing yards	108	39
Passing yards	129	391
Turnovers	4	0
Time of possession	34:51	25:09

Team	Category	Player	Statistics
Western New Mexico	Passing	Matt Hommel	17/35, 124 yards, 2 INT
Western New Mexico	Rushing	Justin Harris	16 rushes, 75 yards
Western New Mexico	Receiving	D'Angelo Bowie	3 receptions, 36 yards
Texas A&M–Commerce	Passing	Luis Perez	23/32, 358 yards, 5 TD
Texas A&M–Commerce	Rushing	Darrius Webb	7 rushes, 54 yards
Texas A&M–Commerce	Receiving	D'Arthur Cowan	4 receptions, 87 yards, TD

=== Fort Lewis ===
	1	2	3	4	Total
Skyhawks	7	10	0	0	17
Mustangs	0	0	10	10	20

Statistics	FLC	WNMU
First downs	13	20
Total yards	256	332
Rushing yards	154	85
Passing yards	102	247
Turnovers	2	1
Time of possession	29:28	30:32

Team	Category	Player	Statistics
Fort Lewis	Passing	Bo Coleman	4/9, 81 yards
Fort Lewis	Rushing	Tyler Telphy	18 rushes, 49 yards, TD
Fort Lewis	Receiving	Jake Lowry	1 reception, 48 yards
Western New Mexico	Passing	Javia Hall	27/46, 247 yards, TD
Western New Mexico	Rushing	DeAndre Williams	15 rushes, 52 yards, TD
Western New Mexico	Receiving	Evan Beebe	8 receptions, 92 yards

=== At Angelo State ===
	1	2	3	4	Total
Mustangs	7	0	0	0	7
Rams	7	28	6	3	44

Statistics	WNMU	ASU
First downs	12	32
Total yards	241	587
Rushing yards	68	235
Passing yards	173	352
Turnovers	3	1
Time of possession	24:57	35:03

Team	Category	Player	Statistics
Western New Mexico	Passing	Javia Hall	18/44, 173 yards, TD, INT
Western New Mexico	Rushing	Justin Harris	16 rushes, 45 yards
Western New Mexico	Receiving	Evan Beebe	5 receptions, 91 yards
Angelo State	Passing	Jake Faber	27/40, 335 yards, 3 TD, INT
Angelo State	Rushing	Tyrese Nathan	15 rushes, 82 yards, TD
Angelo State	Receiving	Tyrese Nathan	4 receptions, 80 yards, TD

=== Texas A&M–Kingsville ===
	1	2	3	4	Total
Javelinas	3	7	13	0	23
Mustangs	14	14	0	7	35

Statistics	TAMUK	WNMU
First downs	16	25
Total yards	268	380
Rushing yards	104	153
Passing yards	164	227
Turnovers	3	0
Time of possession	26:26	33:34

Team	Category	Player	Statistics
Texas A&M–Kingsville	Passing	Cade Dyal	15/23, 151 yards, TD, INT
Texas A&M–Kingsville	Rushing	Nick Pelrean	14 rushes, 78 yards, TD
Texas A&M–Kingsville	Receiving	Jordan Thomas	3 receptions,, 57 yards, 2 TD
Western New Mexico	Passing	Javia Hall	23/41, 227 yards, 3 TD
Western New Mexico	Rushing	Justin Harris	25 rushes, 153 yards, TD
Western New Mexico	Receiving	D'Angelo Bowie	9 receptions, 100 yards, 2 TD

=== At West Texas A&M ===
	1	2	3	4	Total
Mustangs	7	7	0	7	21
Buffaloes	3	7	0	7	17

Statistics	WNMU	WTAMU
First downs	21	17
Total yards	300	353
Rushing yards	105	116
Passing yards	195	237
Turnovers	1	0
Time of possession	26:57	33:03

Team	Category	Player	Statistics
Western New Mexico	Passing	Javia Hall	17/28, 195 yards, 2 TD, INT
Western New Mexico	Rushing	Justin Harris	9 rushes, 55 yards
Western New Mexico	Receiving	D'Angelo Bowie	9 receptions, 100 yards, 2 TD
West Texas A&M	Passing	Ben Arbuckle	17/31, 237 yards, 2 TD
West Texas A&M	Rushing	Warren Witherspoon	21 rushes, 75 yards
West Texas A&M	Receiving	Avery Lewis	4 receptions, 64 yards, TD
