= 2017 Eastern New Mexico Greyhounds football team =

American college football season

2017 Eastern New Mexico Greyhounds football
- Conference: Lone Star Conference
- Record: 8–2 (6–2 LSC)
- Head coach: Kelley Lee (1st season)
- Offensive scheme: Gun option
- Defensive coordinator: Ivan Cordova (1st season)
- Base defense: 3–4
- Home stadium: Greyhound Stadium

2017 Lone Star Conference football standings
	Conf.			Overall
Team	W		L	W		L
No. 11 Midwestern State $^	8	–	0	10	–	1
No. 1 Texas A&M–Commerce ^	7	–	1	14	–	1
Eastern New Mexico	6	–	2	8	–	2
Tarleton State #	4	–	4	6	–	6
Angelo State #	4	–	4	6	–	5
Western New Mexico	3	–	5	4	–	7
Texas A&M–Kingsville	2	–	6	4	–	7
West Texas A&M	1	–	7	3	–	8
UT Permian Basin	1	–	7	2	–	9
$ – Conference champion; ^ – NCAA Division II playoff participant; # – bowl participant (Tarleton State - Heritage Bowl, Angelo State - C.H.A.M.P.S. Heart of Texas Bowl); Rankings from AFCA poll

The 2017 Eastern New Mexico football team represented Eastern New Mexico University in the 2017 NCAA Division II football season. They were led by first year head coach Kelley Lee. The Greyhounds played their home games at Greyhound Stadium and were members of the Lone Star Conference. The Greyhounds finished the season 8–2, 6–2 in LSC play. The 2017 squad tied the school record for wins in a season with 8.

== LSC media poll ==
The LSC media poll was released on August 22, 2017. The Greyhounds were predicted to finish fourth in the conference.

== Schedule ==
Eastern New Mexico announced its 2017 football schedule on April 3, 2017. The schedule consisted of five home and away games in the regular season. The Greyhounds hosted LSC foes Angelo State, Midwestern State, UT Permian Basin, and Texas A&M–Kingsville and will travel to Tarleton State, West Texas A&M, Texas A&M–Commerce, and Western New Mexico.

The Greyhounds hosted one of two of its non-conference games against Southwest Baptist from the Great Lakes Valley Conference and traveled to the team's other opponent West Liberty from the Mountain East Conference.

Date	Time	Opponent	Rank	Site	Result	Attendance
August 31	7:00 p.m	No. 18 Southwest Baptist*		Greyhound Stadium; Portales, NM	W 23–21	3,098
September 9	12:00 p.m.	at Western New Mexico		Altamirano Stadium; Silver City, NM	W 37–34	789
September 16	5:00 p.m.	at No. 3 Texas A&M–Commerce		Memorial Stadium; Commerce, TX	L 22–51	9,233
September 23	7:00 p.m.	Angelo State		Greyhound Stadium; Portales, NM	W 31–21	777
September 30	5:00 p.m.	at West Texas A&M		Kimbrough Memorial Stadium; Canyon, TX (Wagon Wheel)	W 28–14	7,629
October 7	7:00 p.m.	UT Permian Basin^{†}		Greyhound Stadium; Portales, NM	W 20–17	2,694
October 14	1:00 p.m.	at Tarleton State		Memorial Stadium; Stephenville, TX	W 24–15	3,142
October 28	7:00 p.m.	Texas A&M–Kingsville	No. 21	Greyhound Stadium; Portales, NM	W 51–34	1,019
November 2	4:00 p.m.	at West Liberty*	No. 21	West Family Stadium; West Liberty, WV	W 45–24	526
November 11	7:00 p.m.	No. 4 Midwestern State	No. 20	Greyhound Stadium; Portales, NM	L 43–56	2,032
*Non-conference game; ^{†}Homecoming; Rankings from Coaches' Poll released prior to the game; All times are in Mountain time

== Rankings ==
Ranking movements Legend: ██ Increase in ranking ██ Decrease in ranking — = Not ranked RV = Received votes
	Week												
Poll	Pre	1	2	3	4	5	6	7	8	9	10	11	Final
AFCA	—	RV	RV	RV	RV	RV	RV	24	21	21	20	24	RV

== Game summaries ==
=== No. 18 Southwest Baptist ===
No. 18 Southwest Baptist Bearcats at Eastern New Mexico Greyhounds – Game summary

Quarter	1	2	3	4	Total
No. 18 Bearcats	7	7	0	7	21
Greyhounds	14	3	3	3	23

at Greyhound Stadium, Portales, New Mexico

- Date: August 31
- Game time: 7:00 p.m. MDT
- Game attendance: 3,098
- Referee: Dan Rankin
- Box score, Recap

Game information
First quarter
- SBU – Cassian Foreman 62-yard pass from T. J. Edwards (Jordan LeClair kick), 13:40. Bearcats 7–0. Drive: 6 plays, 75 yards, 1:20.
- ENMU – Johnny Smith 56-yard pass from Wyatt Strand (Bailey Hale kick), 9:20. Tied 7–7. Drive: 9 plays, 85 yards, 4:13.
- ENMU – Kamal Cass 1-yard run (Bailey Hale kick), 2:55. Greyhounds 14–7. Drive: 10 plays, 60 yards, 4:47.

Second quarter

- SBU – T. J. Edwards 1-yard run (Jordan LeClair kick), 12:36. Tied 14–14. Drive: 3 plays, 19 yards, 0:53.
- ENMU – Bailey Hale 36-yard field goal, 7:31. Greyhounds 17–14. Drive: 10 plays, 56 yards, 5:05.

Third quarter

- ENMU – Bailey Hale 41-yard field goal, 0:45. Greyhounds 20–14. Drive: 16 plays, 68 yards, 8:44.

Fourth quarter

- SBU – Chris Robb 35-yard pass from Kendrick Payne (Jordan LeClair kick), 11:39. Bearcats 21–20. Drive: 11 plays, 88 yards, 3:57.
- ENMU – Bailey Hale 41-yard field goal, 0:07. Greyhounds 23–21. Drive: 7 plays, 17 yards, 1:40.

Statistics	SBU	ENMU
First downs	16	19
Total yards	293	314
Rushing yards	102	204
Passing yards	191	110
Turnovers	2	2
Time of possession	21:12	38:48

Team	Category	Player	Statistics
Southwest Baptist	Passing	T. J. Edwards	17/34, 156 yards, TD
Southwest Baptist	Rushing	T. J. Edwards	10 rushes, 51 yards, TD
Southwest Baptist	Receiving	Chris Robb	5 receptions, 70 yards, TD
Eastern New Mexico	Passing	Wyatt Strand	7/13, 110 yards, TD
Eastern New Mexico	Rushing	Kamal Cass	28 rushes, 98 yards, TD
Eastern New Mexico	Receiving	Johnny Smith	1 reception, 56 yards, TD

=== At Western New Mexico ===
Eastern New Mexico Greyhounds at Western New Mexico Mustangs – Game summary

Quarter	1	2	3	4	Total
Greyhounds	14	3	7	13	37
Mustangs	7	7	13	7	34

at Altamirano Stadium, Silver City, New Mexico

- Date: September 9
- Game time: 12:00 p.m. MDT
- Game weather: Partly cloudy, 82 °F (28 °C)
- Game attendance: 789
- Referee: Marcus Thornton
- Box score, Recap

Game information
First quarter
- ENMU – Johnny Smith 3-yard run (Bailey Hale kick), 13:24. Greyhounds 7–0. Drive: 4 plays, 40 yards, 1:36.
- WNMU – Tyler Butler 85-yard fumble return (Collin Grady kick), 10:49. Tied 7–7.
- ENMU – D'Maujeric Tucker 13-yard run (Bailey Hale kick), 2:52. Greyhounds 14–7. Drive: 8 plays, 59 yards, 3:15.

Second quarter

- ENMU – Bailey Hale 32-yard field goal, 10:24. Greyhounds 17–7. Drive: 8 plays, 32 yards, 2:54.
- WNMU – D'Angelo Bowie 12-yard pass from Javia Hall (Collin Grady kick), 0:12. Greyhounds 17–14. Drive: 5 plays, 62 yards, 0:59.

Third quarter

- WNMU – Evan Beebe 29-yard pass from Javia Hall (Collin Grady kick), 10:33. Mustangs 21–17. Drive: 10 plays, 75 yards, 4:27.
- ENMU – Kamal Cass 1-yard run (Bailey Hale kick), 5:21. Greyhounds 24–21. Drive: 13 plays, 48 yards, 5:10.
- WNMU – Sean North 17-yard pass from Javia Hall (kick blocked), 3:33. Mustangs 27–24. Drive: 5 plays, 75 yards, 1:48.

Fourth quarter

- ENMU – Kamal Cass 9-yard run (Bailey Hale kick), 13:50. Greyhounds 31–27. Drive: 3 plays, 63 yards, 1:03.
- ENMU – Wyatt Strand 1-yard run (kick blocked), 1:36. Greyhounds 37–27. Drive: 11 plays, 83 yards, 4:49.
- WNMU – Elijah Jones 23-yard pass from Javia Hall (Collin Grady kick), 0:55. Greyhounds 37–34. Drive: 4 plays, 62 yards, 0:29.

Statistics	ENMU	WNMU
First downs	21	21
Total yards	404	444
Rushing yards	367	26
Passing yards	37	418
Turnovers	1	5
Time of possession	35:05	24:55

Team	Category	Player	Statistics
Eastern New Mexico	Passing	Wyatt Strand	4/9, 37 yards
Eastern New Mexico	Rushing	Tayshaun Gary	9 rushes, 113 yards
Eastern New Mexico	Receiving	Russell Montoya	2 receptions, 26 yards
Western New Mexico	Passing	Javia Hall	21/41, 418 yards, 4 TD, 2 INT
Western New Mexico	Rushing	DeAndre Williams	9 rushes, 17 yards
Western New Mexico	Receiving	Evan Beebe	5 receptions, 125 yards, TD

=== At No. 3 Texas A&M–Commerce ===
Eastern New Mexico Greyhounds at No. 3 Texas A&M–Commerce Lions – Game summary

Quarter	1	2	3	4	Total
Greyhounds	3	12	7	0	22
No. 3 Lions	13	28	7	3	51

at Memorial Stadium, Commerce, Texas

- Date: September 16
- Game time: 6:00 p.m. CDT/5:00 p.m. MDT
- Game weather: Clear, 89 °F (32 °C)
- Game attendance: 9,233
- Referee: Joe Horn
- Box score, Recap

Game information

First quarter

- TAMUC – Carandal Hale 3-yard run (Kristov Martinez kick), 12:06. Lions 7–0. Drive: 7 plays, 75 yards, 2:54.
- ENMU – Bailey Hale 48-yard field goal, 5:15. Lions 7–3. Drive: 12 plays, 36 yards, 6:38.
- TAMUC – Vincnet Hobbs 56-yard pass from Luis Perez (kick blocked), 3:45. Lions 13–3. Drive: 4 plays, 75 yards, 1:30.

Second quarter

- ENMU – D'Maujeric Tucker 11-yard run (kick blocked), 14:22. Lions 13–9. Drive: 10 plays, 72 yards, 4:23.
- TAMUC – Darrion Landry 64-yard pass from Luis Perez (Kristov Martinez kick), 13:53. Lions 20–9. Drive: 1 play, 59 yards, 0:22.
- TAMUC – D'Arthur Cowan 54-yard pass from Luis Perez (Kristov Martinez kick), 11:18. Lions 27–9. Drive: 1 play, 54 yards, 0:20.
- TAMUC – Buck Wilson 15-yard pass from Luis Perez (Kristov Martinez kick), 6:16. Lions 34–9. Drive: 8 plays, 54 yards, 3:24.
- ENMU – Dakota Montoya 4-yard interception return (pass failed), 0:50. Lions 34–15.
- TAMUC – Darrion Landry 23-yard pass from Luis Perez (Kristov Martinez kick), 0:19. Lions 41–15. Drive: 2 plays, 23 yards, 0:19.

Third quarter

- ENMU – Wyatt Strand 2-yard run (Bailey Hale kick), 8:15. Lions 41–22. Drive: 14 plays, 75 yards, 6:45.
- TAMUC – Luis Perez 6-yard run (Kristov Martinez kick), 5:14. Lions 48–22. Drive: 8 plays, 39 yards, 2:59.

Fourth quarter

- TAMUC – Kristov Martinez 25-yard field goal, 7:07. Lions 51–22. Drive: 11 plays, 75 yards, 5:56.

Statistics	ENMU	TAMUC
First downs	19	19
Total yards	319	445
Rushing yards	241	87
Passing yards	78	358
Turnovers	2	1
Time of possession	39:14	20:46

Team	Category	Player	Statistics
Eastern New Mexico	Passing	Wyatt Strand	7/10, 68 yards
Eastern New Mexico	Rushing	Kamal Cass	25 rushes, 118 yards
Eastern New Mexico	Receiving	Clayton Smith	4 receptions, 52 yards
Texas A&M–Commerce	Passing	Luis Perez	20/24, 357 yards, 5 TD, INT
Texas A&M–Commerce	Rushing	Carandal Hale	8 rushes, 62 yards, TD
Texas A&M–Commerce	Receiving	Darrion Landry	7 receptions, 112 yards, 2 TD

=== UT Permian Basin ===
UT Permian Basin Falcons at Eastern New Mexico Greyhounds – Game summary

Quarter	1	2	3	4	Total
Falcons	0	0	17	0	17
Greyhounds	7	10	3	0	20

at Greyhound Stadium, Portales, New Mexico

- Date: October 7
- Game time: 7:00 p.m. MDT
- Game attendance: 2,694
- Referee: Sergio Luna
- Box score, Recap

Game information
First quarter
- ENMU – Kamal Cass 13-yard pass from Wyatt Strand (Bailey Hale kick), 11:17. Greyhounds 7–0. Drive: 7 plays, 73 yards, 3:43.

Second quarter

- ENMU – Bailey Hale 30-yard field goal, 2:51. Greyhounds 10–0. Drive: 10 plays, 79 yards, 5:00.
- ENMU – Kamal Cass 58-yard run (Bailey Hale kick), 1:35. Greyhounds 17–0. Drive: 1 play, 58 yards, 0:10.

Third quarter

- UTPB – Kristian Brown 14-yard pass from Kameron Mathis (Bailey Giffen kick), 12:11. Greyhounds 17–7. Drive: 3 plays, 14 yards, 0:14.
- UTPB – Bailey Giffen 21-yard field goal, 8:27. Greyhounds 17–10. Drive: 7 plays, 33 yards, 2:07.
- ENMU – Bailey Hale 43-yard field goal, 4:54. Greyhounds 20–10. Drive: 7 plays, 40 yards, 3:24.
- UTPB – Marquee Allison 1-yard run (Bailey Giffen kick), 4:01. Greyhounds 20–17. Drive: 3 plays, 75 yards, 0:53.

Fourth quarter

- No scoring plays

Statistics	UTPB	ENMU
First downs	9	19
Total yards	224	468
Rushing yards	11	375
Passing yards	213	93
Turnovers	0	3
Time of possession	21:30	38:30

Team	Category	Player	Statistics
UT Permian Basin	Passing	Kameron Mathis	12/33, 213 yards, TD
UT Permian Basin	Rushing	Brandon Infiesto	10 rushes, 25 yards
UT Permian Basin	Receiving	Mitchell Leonard	5 receptions, 94 yards
Eastern New Mexico	Passing	Wyatt Strand	5/10, 93 yards, TD, INT
Eastern New Mexico	Rushing	Kamel Cass	30 rushes, 154 yards, TD
Eastern New Mexico	Receiving	Kamal Cass	2 receptions, 54 yards, TD
