= 2017 Midwestern State Mustangs football team =

American college football season

2017 Midwestern State Mustangs football
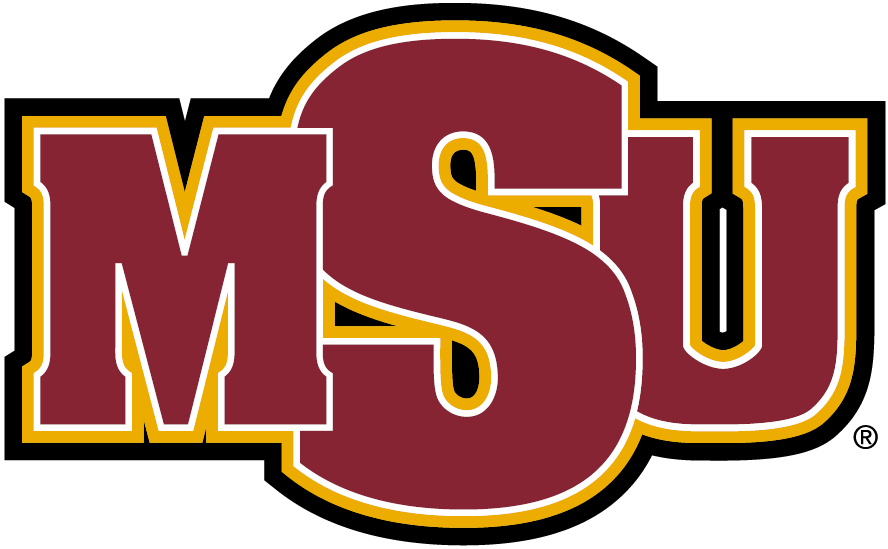

Lone Star Conference champion

NCAA Division II Playoffs Second Round, L 21–63 vs. Minnesota State
- Conference: Lone Star Conference

Ranking
- AFCA: No. 11
- Record: 10–1 (8–0 LSC)
- Head coach: Bill Maskill (16th season)
- Offensive coordinator: Adam Austin (5th season)
- Offensive scheme: Pro spread
- Defensive coordinator: Rich Renner (10th season)
- Base defense: 4–3
- Home stadium: Memorial Stadium

2017 Lone Star Conference football standings
	Conf.			Overall
Team	W		L	W		L
No. 11 Midwestern State $^	8	–	0	10	–	1
No. 1 Texas A&M–Commerce ^	7	–	1	14	–	1
Eastern New Mexico	6	–	2	8	–	2
Tarleton State #	4	–	4	6	–	6
Angelo State #	4	–	4	6	–	5
Western New Mexico	3	–	5	4	–	7
Texas A&M–Kingsville	2	–	6	4	–	7
West Texas A&M	1	–	7	3	–	8
UT Permian Basin	1	–	7	2	–	9
$ – Conference champion; ^ – NCAA Division II playoff participant; # – bowl participant (Tarleton State - Heritage Bowl, Angelo State - C.H.A.M.P.S. Heart of Texas Bowl); Rankings from AFCA poll

The 2017 Midwestern State Mustangs football team represented Midwestern State University in the 2017 NCAA Division II football season. They were led by head coach Bill Maskill, who is in his 16th season at Midwestern State. The Mustangs played their home games at Memorial Stadium and were members of the Lone Star Conference.

== Preseason ==
=== LSC media poll ===
The LSC media poll was released on August 22, 2017. The Mustangs were predicted to finish second in the conference.

== Schedule ==
Midwestern State announced its 2017 football schedule on January 26, 2017. The schedule consisted of six home and four away games in the regular season. The Mustangs hosted LSC foes Tarleton State, Texas A&M-Commerce, Texas A&M–Kingsville, West Texas A&M, and Western New Mexico and traveled to Angelo State, Eastern New Mexico, and UT Permian Basin.

The Mustangs hosted one of the two non-conference games against Quincy from the Great Lakes Valley Conference and will travel to West Florida from the Gulf South Conference.

Date	Time	Opponent	Rank	Site	Result	Attendance
August 31	7:00 p.m	Quincy*	No. 24	Memorial Stadium; Wichita Falls, TX	W 53–6	7,077
September 9	6:00 p.m.	at West Florida*	No. 16	Blue Wahoos Stadium; Pensacola, FL	Cancelled^{[a]}	
September 16	7:00 p.m.	Texas A&M–Kingsville	No. 13	Memorial Stadium; Wichita Falls, TX	W 35–13	7,613
September 30	7:00 p.m.	Western New Mexico	No. 12	Memorial Stadium; Wichita Falls, TX	W 35–24	8,737
October 7	7:00 p.m.	No. 2 Texas A&M–Commerce	No. 10	Memorial Stadium; Wichita Falls, TX	W 47–42	9,201
October 14	6:00 p.m.	at Angelo State	No. 6	LeGrand Sports Complex; San Angelo, TX	W 41–27	2,164
October 21	8:00 p.m.	West Texas A&M^{†}	No. 5	Memorial Stadium; Wichita Falls, TX	W 45–3	8,020
October 28	6:00 p.m.	at UT Permian Basin	No. 5	Ratliff Stadium; Odessa, TX	W 66–8	1,154
November 4	2:00 p.m.	Tarleton State	No. 4	Memorial Stadium; Wichita Falls, TX	W 45–42 ^{OT}	8,111
November 11	8:00 p.m.	Eastern New Mexico	No. 4	Greyhound Stadium; Portales, NM	W 56–43	2,032
November 18	1:00 p.m.	No. 18 Sioux Falls	No. 5	Memorial Stadium; Wichita Falls, TX (NCAA Division II First Round)	W 24–20	7,502
November 25	12:00 p.m.	No. 1 Minnesota State	No. 5	Blakeslee Stadium; Mankato, MN (NCAA Division II Second Round)	L 21–63	1,358
*Non-conference game; ^{†}Homecoming; Rankings from AFCA Poll released prior to the game; All times are in Central time

^{^[a]}The game between Midwestern State and West Florida was cancelled in advance of the arrival of Hurricane Irma.

== Rankings ==
Ranking movements Legend: ██ Increase in ranking ██ Decrease in ranking
	Week													
Poll	Pre	1	2	3	4	5	6	7	8	9	10	11	12	Final
AFCA	24	16	13	13	12	10	6	5	5	4	4	5	5	11

== Game summaries ==
=== Western New Mexico ===
	1	2	3	4	Total
WNMU Mustangs	14	3	7	0	24
No. 12 MSU Mustangs	7	7	14	7	35

Statistics	WNMU	MSU
First downs	28	23
Total yards	467	432
Rushing yards	139	106
Passing yards	328	326
Turnovers	1	0
Time of possession	36:25	23:35

Team	Category	Player	Statistics
Western New Mexico	Passing	Javia Hall	28/41, 328 yards, 2 TD
Western New Mexico	Rushing	Justin Harris	18 rushes, 109 yards, TD
Western New Mexico	Receiving	Elijah Jones	5 receptions, 73 yards
Midwestern State	Passing	Layton Rabb	20/31, 326 yards, 2 TD
Midwestern State	Rushing	Adrian Seales	19 rushes, 86 yards, TD
Midwestern State	Receiving	D. J. Myers	4 receptions, 130 yards, TD

=== No. 2 Texas A&M–Commerce ===
	1	2	3	4	Total
No. 2 Lions	0	14	7	21	42
No. 10 Mustangs	6	21	20	0	47

Statistics	TAMUC	MSU
First downs	29	25
Total yards	515	539
Rushing yards	78	274
Passing yards	437	265
Turnovers	3	0
Time of possession	29:12	30:48

Team	Category	Player	Statistics
Texas A&M–Commerce	Passing	Luis Perez	43/55, 437 yards, 4 TD, 2 INT
Texas A&M–Commerce	Rushing	Carandal Hale	9 rushes, 62 yards, TD
Texas A&M–Commerce	Receiving	Vincent Hobbs	7 receptions, 105 yards
Midwestern State	Passing	Layton Rabb	16/28, 265 yards, 3 TD
Midwestern State	Rushing	Vincent Johnson	19 rushes, 133 yards, 3 TD
Midwestern State	Receiving	Tyrique Edwards	7 receptions, 94 yards, TD

=== At UT Permian Basin ===
	1	2	3	4	Total
No. 5 Mustangs	24	14	14	14	66
Falcons	0	6	2	0	8

Statistics	MSU	UTPB
First downs	28	20
Total yards	667	367
Rushing yards	243	253
Passing yards	424	114
Turnovers	0	4
Time of possession	26:47	33:13

Team	Category	Player	Statistics
Midwestern State	Passing	Layton Rabb	16/23, 280 yards, 5 TD
Midwestern State	Rushing	Adrian Seales	9 rushes, 87 yards
Midwestern State	Receiving	DeAndre Black	7 receptions, 177 yards, 2 TD
UT Permian Basin	Passing	Kameron Mathis	16/32, 114 yards, 3 INT
UT Permian Basin	Rushing	Marquis Simmons	28 rushes, 133 yards, TD
UT Permian Basin	Receiving	Mitchell Leonard	6 receptions, 45 yards
