= 2017 West Texas A&M Buffaloes football team =

American college football season

2017 West Texas A&M Buffaloes football
- Conference: Lone Star Conference
- Record: 3–8 (1–7 LSC)
- Head coach: Hunter Hughes (1st season)
- Offensive coordinator: Ryan McDonough (1st season)
- Offensive scheme: Multiple
- Defensive coordinator: Miles Kochevar (1st season)
- Base defense: 3–4
- Home stadium: Kimbrough Memorial Stadium

2017 Lone Star Conference football standings
	Conf.			Overall
Team	W		L	W		L
No. 11 Midwestern State $^	8	–	0	10	–	1
No. 1 Texas A&M–Commerce ^	7	–	1	14	–	1
Eastern New Mexico	6	–	2	8	–	2
Tarleton State #	4	–	4	6	–	6
Angelo State #	4	–	4	6	–	5
Western New Mexico	3	–	5	4	–	7
Texas A&M–Kingsville	2	–	6	4	–	7
West Texas A&M	1	–	7	3	–	8
UT Permian Basin	1	–	7	2	–	9
$ – Conference champion; ^ – NCAA Division II playoff participant; # – bowl participant (Tarleton State - Heritage Bowl, Angelo State - C.H.A.M.P.S. Heart of Texas Bowl); Rankings from AFCA poll

The 2017 West Texas A&M Buffaloes football team represented West Texas A&M University in the 2017 NCAA Division II football season. They were led by first-year head coach Hunter Hughes. The Buffaloes played their home games at Kimbrough Memorial Stadium and were members of the Lone Star Conference.

== Schedule ==
West Texas A&M announced its 2017 football schedule on January 5, 2017. The schedule consisted of seven home and four away games in the regular season.

Date	Time	Opponent	Site	Result	Attendance
September 2	6:00 p.m.	No. 13 Azusa Pacific*	Kimbrough Memorial Stadium; Canyon, TX	L 13–24	6,198
September 9	6:00 p.m.	No. 7 CSU Pueblo*	Kimbrough Memorial Stadium; Canyon, TX	W 24–21	6,095
September 16	3:00 p.m.	UT Permian Basin	Kimbrough Memorial Stadium; Canyon, TX	W 17–6	6,579
September 23	7:00 p.m.	at Tarleton State	Memorial Stadium; Stephenville, TX	L 20–30	6,823
September 30	6:00 p.m.	Eastern New Mexico	Kimbrough Memorial Stadium; Canyon, TX (Wagon Wheel)	L 14–28	7,629
October 7	7:00 p.m.	at Texas A&M–Kingsville	Javelina Stadium; Kingsville, TX	L 9–37	4,785
October 14	5:00 p.m.	Adams State*^{†}	Kimbrough Memorial Stadium; Canyon, TX	W 17–14	8,327
October 21	8:00 p.m.	at No. 5 Midwestern State	Memorial Stadium; Wichita Falls, TX	L 3–45	8,020
October 28	6:00 p.m.	No. 9 Texas A&M–Commerce	Kimbrough Memorial Stadium; Canyon, TX (East Texas vs. West Texas)	L 16–35	3,896
November 4	6:00 p.m.	at Angelo State	LeGrand Stadium; San Angelo, TX	L 3–51	2,832
November 11	1:00 p.m.	Western New Mexico	Kimbrough Memorial Stadium; Canyon, TX	L 17–21	5,487
*Non-conference game; ^{†}Homecoming; Rankings from AFCA Poll released prior to the game; All times are in Central time

== Game summaries ==
=== No. 13 Azusa Pacific ===
	1	2	3	4	Total
No. 13 Cougars	10	0	7	7	24
Buffaloes	0	0	7	6	13

Statistics	APU	WT
First downs	15	19
Total yards	314	317
Rushing yards	78	223
Passing yards	236	94
Turnovers	1	1
Time of possession	26:19	33:41

Team	Category	Player	Statistics
Azusa Pacific	Passing	Andrew Elffers	15/22, 236 yards, TD, INT
Azusa Pacific	Rushing	Gavin McDaniel	16 rushes, 54 yards, TD
Azusa Pacific	Receiving	Weston Carr	9 receptions, 161 yards, TD
West Texas A&M	Passing	Justin Houghtaling	9/21, 94 yards
West Texas A&M	Rushing	Warren Witherspoon	24 rushes, 138 yards
West Texas A&M	Receiving	Avery Lewis	3 receptions, 42 yards

=== No. 7 CSU Pueblo ===
	1	2	3	4	Total
No. 7 ThunderWolves	7	14	0	0	21
Buffaloes	3	8	0	13	24

Statistics	CSUP	WT
First downs	16	14
Total yards	310	223
Rushing yards	79	133
Passing yards	231	90
Turnovers	4	1
Time of possession	24:43	35:17

Team	Category	Player	Statistics
CSU Pueblo	Passing	Brandon Edwards	18/25, 231 yards, INT
CSU Pueblo	Rushing	Austin Micci	20 rushes, 79 yards, 3 TD
CSU Pueblo	Receiving	Morgan Smith	5 receptions, 78 yards
West Texas A&M	Passing	Justin Houghtaling	4/11, 51 yards
West Texas A&M	Rushing	Jordan Johnson	12 rushes, 66 yards, TD
West Texas A&M	Receiving	Junior Pome'e	2 receptions, 35 yards

=== UT Permian Basin ===
	1	2	3	4	Total
Falcons	3	0	0	3	6
Buffaloes	0	7	3	7	17

Statistics	UTPB	WT
First downs	14	15
Total yards	314	222
Rushing yards	68	82
Passing yards	246	140
Turnovers	2	3
Time of possession	28:34	31:26

Team	Category	Player	Statistics
UT Permian Basin	Passing	Kameron Mathis	16/39, 246 yards, 2 INT
UT Permian Basin	Rushing	Brandon Infiesto	8 rushes, 37 yards
UT Permian Basin	Receiving	Courtney McMaryion	2 receptions, 92 yards
West Texas A&M	Passing	Ben Arbuckle	13/24, 140 yards, 2 INT
West Texas A&M	Rushing	Brandon Blair	6 rushes, 31 yards, TD
West Texas A&M	Receiving	Kailan Noseff	3 receptions, 41 yards

=== At Tarleton State ===
	1	2	3	4	Total
Buffaloes	0	0	7	13	20
Texans	0	14	13	3	30

Statistics	WT	TSU
First downs	22	19
Total yards	407	359
Rushing yards	135	242
Passing yards	272	117
Turnovers	2	0
Time of possession	30:14	29:46

Team	Category	Player	Statistics
West Texas A&M	Passing	Justin Houghtaling	17/38, 272 yards, INT
West Texas A&M	Rushing	Jordan Houghtaling	6 rushes, 37 yards, TD
West Texas A&M	Receiving	Markel Steward	6 receptions, 132 yards
Tarleton State	Passing	Zed Woerner	13/20, 117 yards, TD
Tarleton State	Rushing	Xavier Turner	17 rushes, 135 yards, 3 TD
Tarleton State	Receiving	Jeff Thomas	4 receptions, 50 yards

=== Eastern New Mexico ===
	1	2	3	4	Total
Greyhounds	0	0	7	21	28
Buffaloes	7	0	0	7	14

Statistics	ENMU	WT
First downs	25	7
Total yards	447	154
Rushing yards	362	38
Passing yards	85	116
Turnovers	0	2
Time of possession	39:01	20:59

Team	Category	Player	Statistics
Eastern New Mexico	Passing	Wyatt Strand	8/15, 85 yards
Eastern New Mexico	Rushing	Kamal Cass	28 rushes, 138 yards, TD
Eastern New Mexico	Receiving	Russell Montoya	2 receptions, 34 yards
West Texas A&M	Passing	Justin Houghtaling	12/20, 116 yards, 2 TD, INT
West Texas A&M	Rushing	Kobe Morrow	10 rushes, 19 yards
West Texas A&M	Receiving	Avery Lewis	1 reception, 38 yards

=== At Texas A&M–Kingsville ===
	1	2	3	4	Total
Buffaloes	0	9	0	0	9
Javelinas	7	14	9	7	37

Statistics	WT	TAMUK
First downs	11	19
Total yards	187	420
Rushing yards	12	167
Passing yards	175	253
Turnovers	2	0
Time of possession	26:27	33:33

Team	Category	Player	Statistics
West Texas A&M	Passing	Justin Houghtaling	7/17, 125 yards, TD, INT
West Texas A&M	Rushing	Warren Witherspoon	10 rushes, 25 yards
West Texas A&M	Receiving	Kailan Noseff	3 receptions, 59 yards, TD
Texas A&M–Kingsville	Passing	Cade Dyal	23/29, 249 yards, 3 TD
Texas A&M–Kingsville	Rushing	Nick Pelran	12 rushes, 56 yards
Texas A&M–Kingsville	Receiving	Jordan Thomas	6 receptions, 113 yards, TD

=== Adams State ===
	1	2	3	4	Total
Grizzlies	0	7	7	0	14
Buffaloes	0	7	3	7	17

Statistics	ADAMS	WT
First downs	31	17
Total yards	479	360
Rushing yards	83	189
Passing yards	396	171
Turnovers	5	3
Time of possession	33:46	26:14

Team	Category	Player	Statistics
Adams State	Passing	Nick Rooney	45/55, 385 yards, TD, 3 INT
Adams State	Rushing	Nick Rooney	16 rushes, 47 yards
Adams State	Receiving	Chad Hovasse	14 receptions, 128 yards, TD
West Texas A&M	Passing	Justin Houghtaling	14/23, 171 yards, INT
West Texas A&M	Rushing	Warren Witherspoon	18 rushes, 160 yards, TD
West Texas A&M	Receiving	Jordan Johnson	3 receptions, 59 yards

=== At No. 5 Midwestern State ===
	1	2	3	4	Total
Buffaloes	0	3	0	0	3
No. 5 Mustangs	7	17	7	14	45

Statistics	WT	MSU
First downs	12	24
Total yards	228	521
Rushing yards	74	153
Passing yards	154	368
Turnovers	2	0
Time of possession	24:56	29:57

Team	Category	Player	Statistics
West Texas A&M	Passing	Justin Houghtaling	9/20, 154 yards, 2 INT
West Texas A&M	Rushing	Warren Witherspoon	14 rushes, 33 yards
West Texas A&M	Receiving	Warren Witherspoon	2 receptions, 53 yards
Midwestern State	Passing	Layton Rabb	23/31, 289 yards, 3 TD
Midwestern State	Rushing	Nicholas Gabriel	7 rushes, 44 yards, TD
Midwestern State	Receiving	D. J. Myers	8 receptions, 149 yards, TD

=== No. 9 Texas A&M–Commerce ===
	1	2	3	4	Total
No. 9 Lions	21	7	7	0	35
Buffaloes	10	3	0	3	16

Statistics	TAMUC	WT
First downs	28	13
Total yards	506	243
Rushing yards	60	85
Passing yards	446	158
Turnovers	1	1
Time of possession	27:53	32:07

Team	Category	Player	Statistics
Texas A&M–Commerce	Passing	Luis Perez	30/46, 387 yards, 3 TD
Texas A&M–Commerce	Rushing	Carandal Hale	11 rushes, 44 yards
Texas A&M–Commerce	Receiving	Darrion Landry	6 receptions, 123 yards, TD
West Texas A&M	Passing	Justin Houghtaling	10/20, 158 yards, TD, INT
West Texas A&M	Rushing	Warren Witherspoon	31 rushes, 87 yards
West Texas A&M	Receiving	Avery Lewis	2 receptions, 72 yards

=== At Angelo State ===
	1	2	3	4	Total
Buffaloes	3	0	0	0	3
Rams	14	10	17	10	51

Statistics	WT	ASU
First downs	8	31
Total yards	103	524
Rushing yards	74	154
Passing yards	29	370
Turnovers	5	1
Time of possession	32:57	27:03

Team	Category	Player	Statistics
West Texas A&M	Passing	Justin Houghtaling	3/10, 19 yards, 2 INT
West Texas A&M	Rushing	Warren Witherspoon	31 rushes, 98 yards
West Texas A&M	Receiving	Nick Andress	3 receptions, 23 yards
Angelo State	Passing	Jake Faber	23/31, 270 yards, 4 TD
Angelo State	Rushing	Josh Stevens	21 rushes, 68 yards
Angelo State	Receiving	Keke Chism	6 receptions, 88 yards, TD

=== Western New Mexico ===
	1	2	3	4	Total
Mustangs	7	0	7	7	21
Buffaloes	3	7	0	7	17

Statistics	WNMU	WT
First downs	21	17
Total yards	300	353
Rushing yards	105	116
Passing yards	195	237
Turnovers	1	0
Time of possession	26:57	33:03

Team	Category	Player	Statistics
Western New Mexico	Passing	Javia Hall	17/28, 195 yards, 2 TD, INT
Western New Mexico	Rushing	Justin Harris	9 rushes, 55 yards
Western New Mexico	Receiving	D'Angelo Bowie	9 receptions, 100 yards, 2 TD
West Texas A&M	Passing	Ben Arbuckle	17/31, 237 yards, 2 TD
West Texas A&M	Rushing	Warren Witherspoon	21 rushes, 75 yards
West Texas A&M	Receiving	Avery Lewis	4 receptions, 64 yards, TD
