= 2017 Texas A&M–Kingsville Javelinas football team =

American college football season

2017 Texas A&M–Kingsville Javelinas football
- Conference: Lone Star Conference
- Record: 4–7 (2–6 LSC)
- Head coach: Daren Wilkinson (3rd season)
- Defensive coordinator: David Brown II (3rd season)
- Captain: Game captains
- Home stadium: Javelina Stadium

2017 Lone Star Conference football standings
	Conf.			Overall
Team	W		L	W		L
No. 11 Midwestern State $^	8	–	0	10	–	1
No. 1 Texas A&M–Commerce ^	7	–	1	14	–	1
Eastern New Mexico	6	–	2	8	–	2
Tarleton State #	4	–	4	6	–	6
Angelo State #	4	–	4	6	–	5
Western New Mexico	3	–	5	4	–	7
Texas A&M–Kingsville	2	–	6	4	–	7
West Texas A&M	1	–	7	3	–	8
UT Permian Basin	1	–	7	2	–	9
$ – Conference champion; ^ – NCAA Division II playoff participant; # – bowl participant (Tarleton State - Heritage Bowl, Angelo State - C.H.A.M.P.S. Heart of Texas Bowl); Rankings from AFCA poll

The 2017 Texas A&M–Kingsville Javelinas football team represented Texas A&M University–Kingsville in the 2017 NCAA Division II football season. They were led by third-year head coach Daren Wilkinson. The Javelinas played their home games at Javelina Stadium and were members of the Lone Star Conference.

== Schedule ==
Texas A&M–Kingsville announced its 2017 football schedule on December 3, 2016. The schedule consisted of five home and six away games in the regular season. The Javelinas hosted LSC foes Tarleton State, Texas A&M–Commerce, and West Texas A&M and traveled to Angelo State, Eastern New Mexico, Midwestern State, UT Permian Basin, and Western New Mexico.

The Javelinas hosted two of the three non-conference games against Central Washington from the Great Northwest Athletic Conference (GNAC) and William Jewell from the Great Lakes Valley Conference and will travel to Simon Fraser also from the GNAC.

Date	Time	Opponent	Site	TV	Result	Attendance
September 2	7:00 p.m	Central Washington*	Javelina Stadium; Kingsville, TX		L 10–34	9,237
September 9	3:00 p.m	at Simon Fraser*	Terry Fox Field; Burnaby, British Columbia		W 35–7	575
September 16	7:00 p.m.	at No. 13 Midwestern State	Memorial Stadium; Wichita Falls, TX		L 13–35	7,613
September 23	7:00 p.m.	No. 3 Texas A&M-Commerce	Javelina Stadium; Kingsville, TX		L 7–38	4,324
September 30	6:00 p.m.	at Angelo State	LeGrand Stadium; San Angelo, TX		L 14–40	3,423
October 7	7:00 p.m.	West Texas A&M	Javelina Stadium; Kingsville, TX		W 37–9	4,785
October 14	6:00 p.m.	UT Permian Basin	Ratliff Stadium; Odessa, TX		W 47–21	
October 21	7:00 p.m.	Tarleton State^{†}	Javelina Stadium; Kingsville, TX	ESPN3	L 34–41	9,572
October 28	8:00 p.m.	at No. 21 Eastern New Mexico	Greyhound Stadium; Portales, NM		L 34–51	1,019
November 4	1:00 p.m.	at Western New Mexico	Altamirano Stadium; Silver City, NM		L 23–35	475
November 11	7:00 p.m.	William Jewell*	Javelina Stadium; Kingsville, TX		W 38–34	1,004
*Non-conference game; ^{†}Homecoming; Rankings from Coaches' Poll released prior to the game; All times are in Central time
