= 2017 Tarleton State Texans football team =

American college football season

2017 Tarleton State Texans football
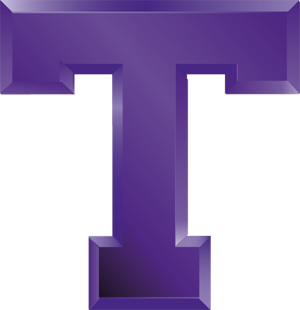

Corsicana Bowl, L 31–38 vs. Central Oklahoma
- Conference: Lone Star Conference
- Record: 6–6 (4–4 LSC)
- Head coach: Todd Whitten (8th season)
- Co-offensive coordinators: Jonathan Beasley (1st season); Bryson Oliver (2nd season)
- Offensive scheme: Spread
- Defensive coordinator: Marcus Patton (2nd season)
- Base defense: 4–3
- Home stadium: Memorial Stadium

2017 Lone Star Conference football standings
	Conf.			Overall
Team	W		L	W		L
No. 11 Midwestern State $^	8	–	0	10	–	1
No. 1 Texas A&M–Commerce ^	7	–	1	14	–	1
Eastern New Mexico	6	–	2	8	–	2
Tarleton State #	4	–	4	6	–	6
Angelo State #	4	–	4	6	–	5
Western New Mexico	3	–	5	4	–	7
Texas A&M–Kingsville	2	–	6	4	–	7
West Texas A&M	1	–	7	3	–	8
UT Permian Basin	1	–	7	2	–	9
$ – Conference champion; ^ – NCAA Division II playoff participant; # – bowl participant (Tarleton State - Heritage Bowl, Angelo State - C.H.A.M.P.S. Heart of Texas Bowl); Rankings from AFCA poll

The 2017 Tarleton State Texans football team represented Tarleton State University in the 2017 NCAA Division II football season. They were led by head coach Todd Whitten, who was in his consecutive second season at Tarleton State and eighth overall as head coach of the Texans. The Texans played their home games at Memorial Stadium and were members of the Lone Star Conference. The Texans finished the regular season with a 6–5 record, 4–4 in the LSC, and tie for fourth place in the Lone Star Conference. The Texans were invited to play in the inaugural Corsicana Bowl in Corsicana, Texas, where they lost to Central Oklahoma, 38–31.

== Schedule ==
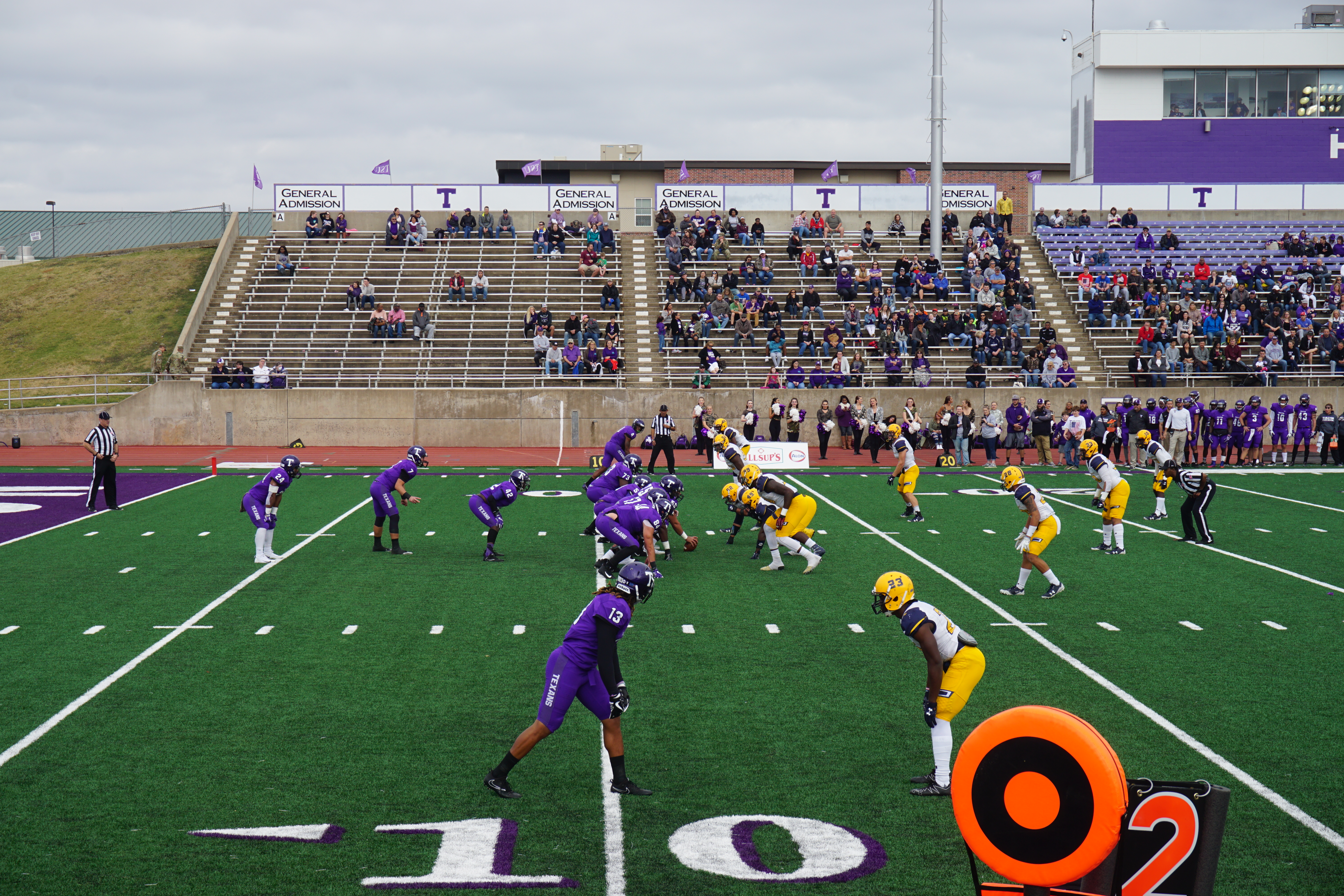
Tarleton State in action against Texas A&M–Commerce

Tarleton State announced its 2017 football schedule on April 25, 2017. The schedule consisted of five home and six away games in the regular season. The Texans hosted LSC foes Eastern New Mexico, Texas A&M-Commerce, and West Texas A&M and traveled to Angelo State, Midwestern State, UT Permian Basin, Texas A&M-Kingsville, and Western New Mexico.

The Texans hosted two of the three non-conference games against Oklahoma Panhandle State from the Central States Football League and Western Oregon from the Great Northwest Athletic Conference and visited Delta State from the Gulf South Conference.

Date	Time	Opponent	Site	TV	Result	Attendance
September 2	2:00 p.m	at Delta State*	Mickey Sellers Field; Cleveland, MS		L 16–34	5,155
September 9	7:00 p.m.	Oklahoma Panhandle State*	Memorial Stadium; Stephenville, TX		W 48–20	6,128
September 16	6:00 p.m.	at Angelo State	LeGrand Stadium; San Angelo, TX		W 30–24	3,139
September 23	7:00 p.m.	West Texas A&M	Memorial Stadium; Stephenville, TX		W 30–20	6,823
September 30	6:00 p.m.	at UT Permian Basin	Ratliff Stadium; Odessa, TX		W 32–17	638
October 7	1:00 p.m.	at Western New Mexico	Altamirano Stadium; Silver City, NM		L 25–38	578
October 14	2:00 p.m.	Eastern New Mexico	Memorial Stadium; Stephenville, TX		L 15–24	3,142
October 21	7:00 p.m.	at Texas A&M–Kingsville	Javelina Stadium; Kingsville, TX	ESPN3	W 41–34	9,572
October 28	6:00 p.m.	Western Oregon*^{†}	Memorial Stadium; Stephenville, TX		W 28–6	6,213
November 4	2:00 p.m.	at No. 4 Midwestern State	Memorial Stadium; Wichita Falls, TX		L 42–45 ^{OT}	8,111
November 11	7:00 p.m.	No. 8 Texas A&M–Commerce	Memorial Stadium; Stephenville, TX		L 21–33	4,231
December 2	12:00 p.m.	vs. Central Oklahoma*	Tiger Stadium; Corsicana, TX (Corsicana Bowl)	FloSports	L 31–38	3,422
*Non-conference game; ^{†}Homecoming; Rankings from AFCA Poll released prior to the game; All times are in Central time
