= Valencia High School =

Valencia High School may refer to:

- Valencia High School (Placentia, California), a public high school in Placentia, California
- Valencia High School (Santa Clarita, California), a public high school in Santa Clarita, California
- Valencia High School (Los Lunas, New Mexico), a public high school in Los Lunas, New Mexico
