= Veterans Memorial Early College High School =

Public school in Texas, United States

Location
- 4550 U.S. Military Highway; Brownsville, Texas 78520; United States; 25.962462°N 97.571706°W

Information
- Type: Public high school
- Established: 2010
- School district: Brownsville Independent School District
- Principal: Linda Gallegos
- Faculty: 136.94 (FTE)
- Grades: 9-12
- Enrollment: 2,172 (2022-23)
- Student to teacher ratio: 15.86
- Colors: Red, white, and blue
- Athletics conference: UIL Class 6A
- Team name: Chargers
- Rivals: Hanna Eagles, Lopez Lobos, Los Fresnos Falcons
- Website: veteransmemorialechs.bisd.us

Veterans Memorial Early College High School is a public high school in Brownsville, Texas, United States. It is one of six high schools operated by the Brownsville Independent School District and classified as a 6A school by the UIL. For the 2024-2025 school year, the school was given an "A" by the Texas Education Agency.

== Athletics ==
The Veterans Memorial Chargers compete in the following sports:

- Baseball
- Basketball
- Cross country
- Football
- Golf
- Powerlifting
- Soccer
- Softball
- Swimming and diving
- Tennis
- Track and field
- Volleyball
- Wrestling

== Clubs and associations ==
- Health Occupations Students of America
- Skills USA
- Technology Student Association
- UIL One Act Play
