= Community National Bank and Trust Stadium (Corsicana) =

High school stadium in Corsicana, Texas

Tiger Field at Community National Bank & Trust Stadium
- Interactive map of Tiger Field at Community National Bank & Trust Stadium
- Location: 3701 W State Highway 22, Corsicana, Texas
- Coordinates: 32°05′11″N 96°30′57″W
- Owner: Corsicana Independent School District
- Capacity: 10,001
- Surface: FieldTurf

Construction
- Built: 2004–2006
- Opened: September 15, 2006
- Cost: $18 million

Tenants
- Corsicana High School (UIL) 2006–present Navarro College (NJCAA) 2006–present Heritage Bowl (NCAA D-II) 2017–present

Community National Bank & Trust Stadium is a 10,001-capacity high school and junior collegiate American football, track and field and soccer stadium adjacent to Corsicana High School in Corsicana, Texas. It is the current home of the Corsicana Tigers football, track and field, and soccer teams, the Navarro College Bulldogs football team, and the Heritage Bowl, an NCAA Division II Football Bowl Game.

== History ==
The sports complex began its history as part of a larger $44.5 million bond project that was passed in 2004 to enlarge the high school, renovate and expand Collins Middle School and improve facilities for sports and other extracurricular activities at both schools. Tiger Stadium sits on about 30 acres (120,000 m^{2}) of a 116-acre (0.47 km^{2}) site bought by the Corsicana Independent School District in 2004 in anticipation of the new stadium. CNBT Stadium replaces Tiger Field, which opened in 1961, as the home for the Corsicana Tigers and Navarro College Bulldogs. In 2021, an apartment complex, known as the Cedar Springs Apartments, was built on the land that the old Tiger Field once stood on, after sitting vacant for 13 years.

The stadium has not only hosted games for the main tenants, but has also recently been used as a neutral site along with other newer high school, collegiate and professional stadiums in Texas in the University Interscholastic League's annual Texas State Football Playoffs.

== Timeline ==
- 2004: Corsicana I.S.D. passes a $44.5 million bond project to enlarge the high school, renovate and expand Collins Middle School, and improve all sports and extracurricular facilities. CISD also purchases a 116-acre (0.47 km^{2}) site adjacent to the high school and Navarro County Exposition Center in anticipation to build a new multi-sport complex. Construction begins on the stadium, parking lots, and field house.
- September 2006: Main construction on Tiger Stadium is completed, all subvarsity home games prior to September 15, 2006, were played at Tiger Field to allow Corsicana High the honors of playing the first game in the stadium.
- September 15, 2006: Corsicana High lost to Waco High 34–10 in the first high school football game played at Tiger Stadium.
- September 16, 2006: Navarro College lost to Kilgore College 27–16 in the first collegiate football game played at Tiger Stadium.
- November 18, 2006: Crockett High defeats Mexia High 49–12, in the first high school football playoff game played at Tiger Stadium. The game was a Class 3A, Division 2, Region 3, Bi-district playoff game in the first round of the 2006 Texas High School Football Playoffs.
- December 2, 2017: The inaugural Corsicana Bowl was held. Central Oklahoma defeated Tarleton State 38 to 31.

| Preceded by Tiger Field | Home of the Corsicana Tigers; 2006 – present | Succeeded by current |
| Preceded by Tiger Field | Home of the Navarro College Bulldogs; 2006 – present | Succeeded by current |
| Preceded by NONE | Home of the Heritage Bowl (Corsicana); 2017 – present | Succeeded by current |
