= Valencia High School (Los Lunas, New Mexico) =

Coordinates: 34°44′11″N 106°38′54″W

- 310 Bonita Vista Blvd; Los Lunas, NM; United States

Information
- Type: Public high school
- Motto: "Educating, equipping, and empowering all students in an environment of high expectations and mutual respect."
- Established: 2006
- Locale: Valencia County
- NCES District ID: 350168000989
- Principal: Jennifer Otero
- Faculty: 109
- Teaching staff: 45
- Grades: 9–12
- Enrollment: 887 (2023–24)
  - Grade 9: 342 (2023–24)
  - Grade 10: 238 (2023–24)
  - Grade 11: 164 (2023–24)
  - Grade 12: 143 (2023–24)
- Colors: Red, turquoise, and silver
- Athletics: Dance, cross country, football, soccer, volleyball, basketball, wrestling, track and field, baseball, softball, golf, swimming, tennis, marching band and cheer
- Mascot: Jaguar
- Website: vhs.llschools.net
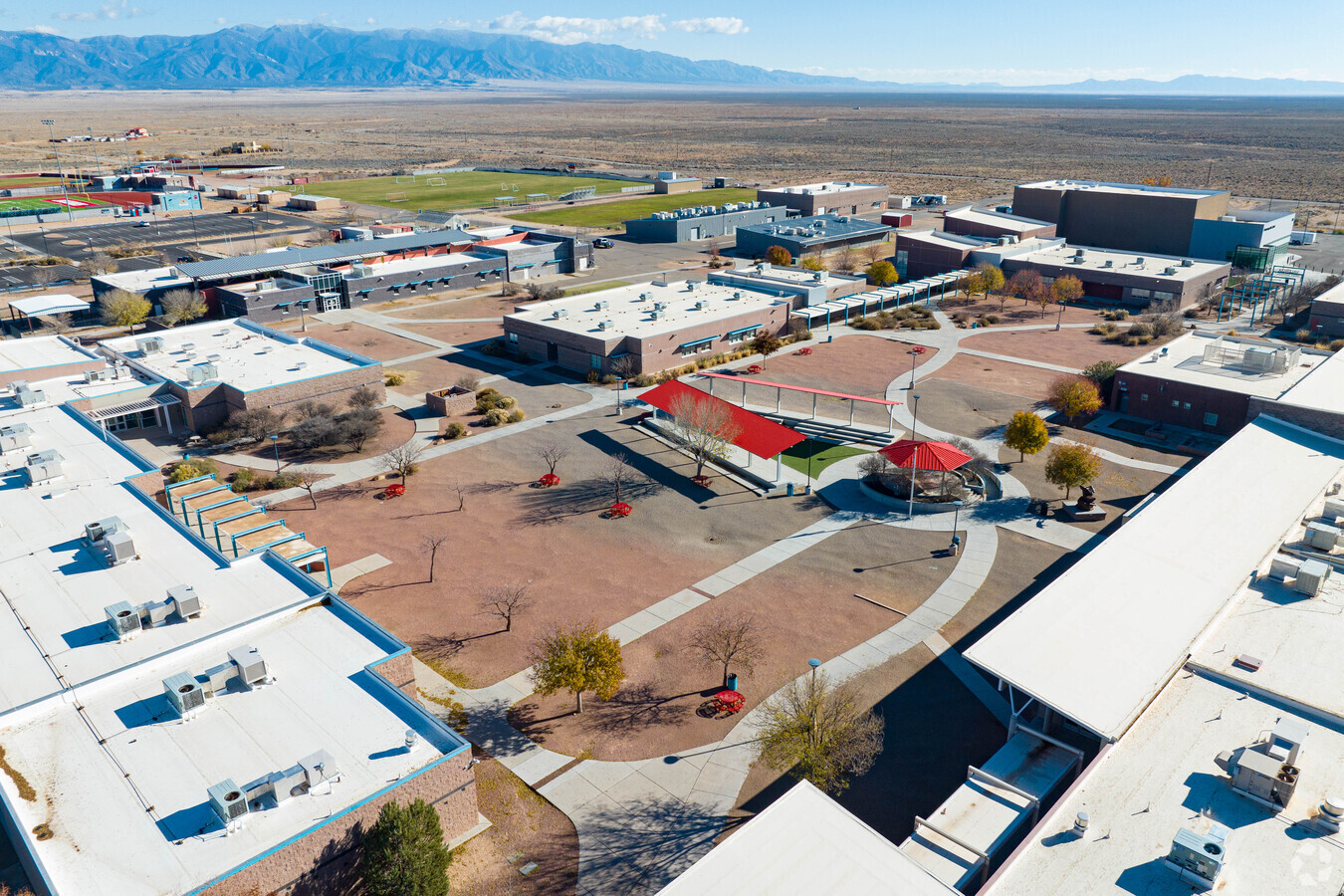

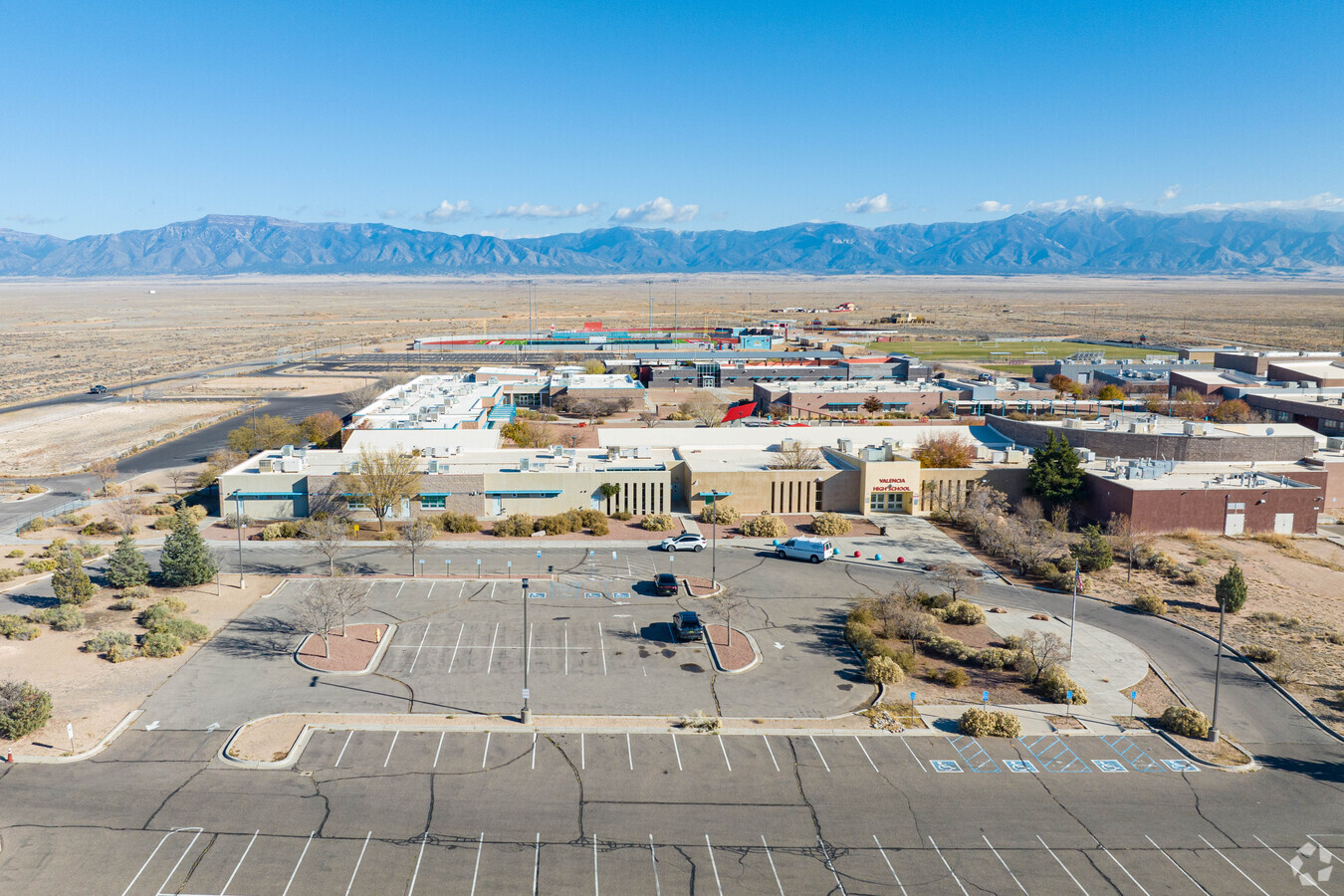

Valencia High School is a high school (grades 9–12) that opened in the fall of 2006 in Los Lunas, Valencia County, New Mexico, United States. Formerly known as the "Los Lunas Career Academy", the high school serves students on the east side of the Rio Grande, with the exception of students who attended Ann Parish Elementary School.

The school campus was founded in 2000 by Claire Fenton under the name of "Los Lunas Career Academy", then a satellite campus of the only high school in Los Lunas, Los Lunas High School. The site adopted the name of Valencia High School shortly after the district re-zoned and create Los Lunas' second formal high school in 2005. Additions to the campus were constructed using $6.3 million from the Public Schools Capital Outlay Commission.

The school mascot is the Jaguar, and the official school colors are turquoise, red and silver.

Valencia is a 3A school The school opened in fall 2006 with its first freshman class. The first full four-year graduating group was the class of 2010.

The school's facilities include a weight room, wrestling room, gymnasium and locker rooms, two soccer fields, a football stadium with an all-weather track, a baseball field, softball field, field house, and a newly built Performing Arts Center.

Valencia High School offers 22 sports programs, eight AP courses, three Pre-AP courses, and two Community Enhanced Learning Programs. It has 13 Level 3 teachers.

== Performing arts ==
In 2017, the newly built Performing Arts Center officially opened. The Valencia High School Concert Bands, Choirs, and Drama Club host performances there.

The Valencia High School Band Program has about 90 students ranging from freshmen to seniors, with all grades participating in all bands at every level. Performing ensembles include Wind Ensemble, Symphonic Band, 2 Jazz Bands (Jazz I and Jazz II), Marching Band, Pep Band, Percussion Ensemble, Mixed Choir, and Chamber Choir. Both the concert bands and marching band are in class 4A.
