= Ben Arbuckle =

American football player and coach (born 1995)

Biographical details
- Born: September 15, 1995 (age 31); Wichita Falls, Texas, U.S.

Playing career
- 2016–2017: West Texas A&M
- Position: Quarterback

Coaching career (HC unless noted)
- 2018–2019: Houston Baptist (QC)
- 2020: Seminole HS (TX) (OC/QB)
- 2021: Western Kentucky (OQC)
- 2022: Western Kentucky (co-OC/QB)
- 2023–2024: Washington State (OC/QB)
- 2025–2026: Oklahoma (OC/QB)

Ben Arbuckle (born September 15, 1995) is an American college football coach who last served as the offensive coordinator and quarterbacks coach for the Oklahoma Sooners football team.

== Playing career ==
Arbuckle grew up in Canadian, Texas and attended Canadian High School. He became Canadian's starting quarterback going into his junior season. Arbuckle passed for over 7,500 yards and with 95 touchdown passes during his high school career.

Arbuckle originally intended to play college football at UTSA, but decided to step away from the game. He later enrolled at West Texas A&M University and joined the West Texas A&M Buffaloes football team after a two year hiatus from the sport. Arbuckle started seven games as a junior and passed for 1,241 yards and 15 touchdowns. He competed for the Buffaloes' starting quarterback job going into his senior season, but was not named the starter.

== Coaching career ==
=== Early career ===
Arbuckle began his coaching career as an offensive quality control assistant at Houston Baptist University. He spent two years at that position. Arbuckle worked with Zach Kittley to coach Bailey Zappe and the rest of the Houston Baptist offense. Arbuckle was hired as the offensive coordinator and quarterbacks coach at Seminole High School in Seminole, Texas, in the summer of 2020.

=== Western Kentucky ===
In 2021, Arbuckle was hired as a quality control coach at Western Kentucky University (WKU) by former Houston Baptist offensive coordinator Zach Kittley. Arbuckle was promoted to quarterbacks coach and co-offensive coordinator after Kittley left at the end of the 2021 to become the offensive coordinator at Texas Tech. Western Kentucky's offense finished sixth nationally in yards per game, first in total passing yards, and 15th in points per game with Arbuckle as the primary play caller in 2022.

=== Washington State ===
In January 2023, Arbuckle was hired as the offensive coordinator and quarterbacks coach at Washington State University. At 27, he was the youngest Power 5 primary coordinator in the country at the time of the hire.

=== Oklahoma ===
On December 2, 2024, Arbuckle was named as the offensive coordinator and quarterbacks coach at the University of Oklahoma under head coach Brent Venables. Arbuckle was fired on November 2nd, 2026.

== Personal life ==
Arbuckle and his wife, Lauren, have a son together.

He graduated from West Texas A&M University in 2018 with a dual degree in finance and economics.
