= Steve Loy Family Foundation Stadium =

Multi-use stadium in Portales, New Mexico

Coordinates: 34°10′40″N 103°21′19″W

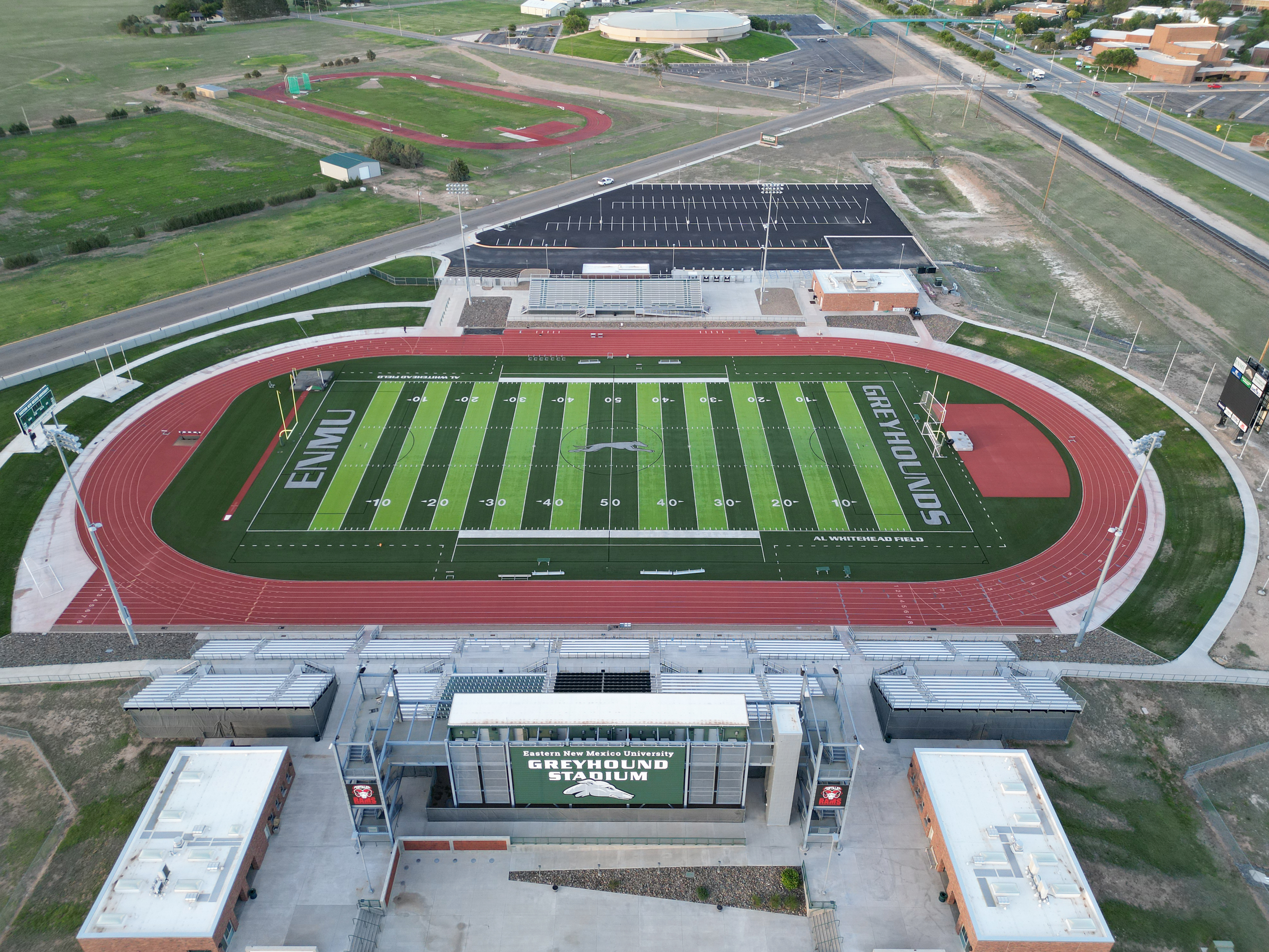
Aerial view of Eastern New Mexico University's Greyhound Stadium in Portales, New Mexico

Steve Loy Family Foundation Stadium (formally Greyhound Stadium), built in 2016, is an artificial surface stadium located in Portales, New Mexico. It is home of the NCAA Division II Eastern New Mexico Greyhounds football, men's and women's soccer and men's and women's track and field teams. The stadium seats 6,100 people, but has a standard capacity of 5,200.

The stadium was relocated on campus, replacing the previous structure near Blackwater Draw in Roosevelt County built in 1969 and opened for the start of the 2016 season. The soccer teams and track and field teams moved to the facility following the renovation. The soccer teams previously played at ENMU Soccer Field and the track and field teams previously hosted home meets at ENMU Track.

On July 30, 2024, the stadium was renamed to the Steve Loy Family Foundation Stadium.
