= Heritage Bowl (Corsicana) =

Annual American NCAA Division II college football bowl game

- Heritage Bowl Powered by Riot
- Stadium: Community National Bank & Trust Stadium
- Location: Corsicana, Texas; United States
- Operated: 2017–present
- Conference tie-ins: At-large picks from GAC, LSC, or MIAA
- Website: heritagebowl.org

Sponsors
- Heritage Bowl Powered by Riot

Former names
- Corsicana Bowl (2017–2018)

The Heritage Bowl is an annual American NCAA Division II college football bowl game held at Community National Bank & Trust Stadium in Corsicana, Texas.

Currently, the Heritage Bowl is one of three Division II sanctioned bowl games, along with the Albanese Candy Bowl and First Americans Bowl. The participants are selected on an at-large basis from teams of the Lone Star Conference (LSC), Mid-America Intercollegiate Athletics Association (MIAA), and Great American Conference (GAC) that do not qualify for the NCAA Division II Football Championship playoffs.

== History ==
The game was established in 2017 by Antwone "Tony" Taulton. Since 2018 the bowl has operated under the non-profit Corsicana Area Foundation, and proceeds from the game go to local Corsicana and Navarro County charities. Initially called the Corsicana Bowl, the game was given its current name in 2019. After the game was not played in 2020 due to the COVID-19 pandemic, Fun Town RV served as title sponsor from 2021–23. On May 31, 2024, Riot Platforms was named the presenting sponsor and the game rebranded as the Heritage Bowl Powered by Riot.

Throughout its existence, the Heritage Bowl has been unique among Division II bowl games in having no fixed conference tie-in. This feature enabled bowl organizers to secure ten different teams for the first five games, and fifteen for the first nine games. Emporia State, invited in 2018 and 2023, UT Permian Basin, in 2021 and 2024, and Central Missouri, in 2024 and 2026, are the only repeat participants thus far. The game has included each of the three possible combinations of the participating conferences. An LSC-GAC matchup has been the most common (four times), followed by GAC-MIAA (three times), and LSC-MIAA (twice).

== Game results ==
Date played	Winning team		Losing team		Attendance	Notes
December 2, 2017	Central Oklahoma (MIAA)	38	Tarleton State (LSC)	31	3,422	
December 1, 2018	Emporia State (MIAA)	30	Arkansas–Monticello (GAC)	22	3,900	
December 7, 2019	Eastern New Mexico (LSC)	20	Southern Arkansas (GAC)	13	2,000	
December 4, 2021	Oklahoma Baptist (GAC)	24	UT Permian Basin (LSC)	21	3,576	
December 3, 2022	East Central (GAC)	38	Texas A&M–Kingsville (LSC)	21	2,000	
December 2, 2023	Emporia State (MIAA)	55	Southern Nazarene (GAC)	24		
December 7, 2024	Central Missouri (MIAA)	39	UT Permian Basin (LSC)	37	3,500	
December 6, 2025	West Texas A&M (LSC)	28	Arkansas Tech (GAC)	27	4,685	
December 5, 2026	Central Missouri (MIAA) vs. Southeastern Oklahoma State (GAC)					

== Wins by conference ==
Conference	Games	Win	Loss	Pct
Mid-America	4	4	0	1.000
Great American	6	2	4	.333
Lone Star	6	2	4	.333

== Appearances by team ==
Team	Appearances	Record
Emporia State	2	2–0
West Texas A&M	1	1–0
Central Missouri	1	1–0
Central Oklahoma	1	1–0
East Central	1	1–0
Eastern New Mexico	1	1–0
Oklahoma Baptist	1	1–0
Arkansas–Monticello	1	0–1
Southern Arkansas	1	0–1
Tarleton State	1	0–1
Texas A&M–Kingsville	1	0–1
Southern Nazarene	1	0–1
Arkansas Tech	1	0–1
UT Permian Basin	2	0–2
