= 2024 UT Permian Basin Falcons football team =

American college football season

2024 UT Permian Basin Falcons football

Heritage Bowl, L 37–39 ^{2OT} vs. Central Missouri
- Conference: Lone Star Conference
- Record: 7–5 (6–3 LSC)
- Head coach: Kris McCullough (2nd season)
- Co-offensive coordinators: Blake Crandall (2nd season); Kenny Hrncir (1st season)
- Offensive scheme: Hurry-up, no-huddle spread
- Defensive coordinator: Jake Shaw (1st season)
- Co-defensive coordinator: Devin Gauldin (1st season)
- Base defense: 3–4
- Home stadium: Astound Broadband Stadium; Ratliff Stadium

2024 Lone Star Conference football standings
	Conf.			Overall
Team	W		L	W		L
No. 20 Angelo State $^	9	–	0	9	–	3
No. 24 Central Washington ^	7	–	2	8	–	4
Texas A&M–Kingsville	6	–	3	7	–	4
UT Permian Basin #	6	–	3	7	–	5
Western Oregon	6	–	3	6	–	5
West Texas A&M	5	–	4	5	–	6
Midwestern State	3	–	6	4	–	7
Sul Ross*	2	–	7	3	–	8
Eastern New Mexico	1	–	8	3	–	8
Western New Mexico	0	–	9	2	–	9
$ – Conference champion; ^ – NCAA Division II playoff participant; # – Heritage Bowl participant * – Sul Ross ineligible for postseason play due to transition from NCAA Division III; Rankings from AFCA poll

The 2024 UT Permian Basin Falcons football team represented the University of Texas Permian Basin (UTPB) in the 2024 NCAA Division II football season as a member of the Lone Star Conference (LSC). They were led by second-year head coach Kris McCullough. The Falcons played most of their home games at Astound Broadband Stadium in Midland, Texas while Ratliff Stadium in Odessa, Texas hosted one game. UTPB entered the 2024 season as the defending LSC champion.

The Falcons finished the regular season with an overall record of 7–4 with an LSC record of 6–3 to finish tied for third place; this marked the first time in program history that the Falcons finished with a winning record in back-to-back seasons. UTPB averaged 428.9 yards of offense per game while scoring an average of 34.5 points per game, both first in the LSC. The team received the conference's bid for the Heritage Bowl, which was the program's second bowl appearance.

== Offseason ==
=== Coaching changes ===
In June 2024, offensive coordinator Ryan Lusby was hired to be the head football coach for Dodge City Community College. Quarterbacks' coach Kenny Hrncir was promoted to co-offensive coordinator, sharing offensive play calling duties with incumbent co-offensive coordinator Blake Crandall.

== Preseason ==
=== LSC media poll ===
The LSC media poll was released on July 25, 2024. The Falcons were predicted to finish third in the conference, and they received four first-place votes.

== Schedule ==
Date	Time	Opponent	Rank	Site	TV	Result	Attendance
August 31	6:00 p.m.	Western New Mexico	No. 21	Ratliff Stadium; Odessa, TX	FloSports	W 41–3	2,573
September 7	7:00 p.m.	at CSU Pueblo*	No. 21	ThunderBowl; Pueblo, CO	RMAC Network	L 23–40	6,447
September 14	6:00 p.m.	Adams State*		Astound Broadband Stadium; Midland, TX	FloSports	W 67–14	7,749
September 21	6:00 p.m.	Texas A&M–Kingsville		Astound Broadband Stadium; Midland, TX	FloSports	L 14–20	5,825
September 28	7:00 p.m.	at Midwestern State		Memorial Stadium; Wichita Falls, TX	FloSports	W 27–3	6,127
October 5	6:00 p.m.	Angelo State		Astound Broadband Stadium; Midland, TX	FloSports	L 7–36	5,629
October 12	8:00 p.m.	at No. 9 Central Washington		Tomlinson Stadium; Ellensburg, WA	FloSports	W 14–13	5,112
October 19	6:00 p.m.	Western Oregon^{†}		Astound Broadband Stadium; Midland, TX	FloSports	L 27–30 ^{OT}	3,515
October 26	7:00 p.m.	at West Texas A&M		Bain–Schaeffer Buffalo Stadium; Canyon, TX	FloSports	W 21–7	6,131
November 9	1:00 p.m.	at Eastern New Mexico		Steve Loy Family Foundation Stadium; Portales, NM	FloSports	W 66–14	2,208
November 16	12:00 p.m.	at Sul Ross		Jackson Field; Alpine, TX	FloSports	W 75–7	200
December 7	12:00 p.m.	vs. No. 25 Central Missouri*		Tiger Stadium; Corsicana, TX (Heritage Bowl)	YouTube	L 37–39 ^{2OT}	3,500
*Non-conference game; ^{†}Homecoming; Rankings from AFCA Poll released prior to the game; All times are in Central time

== Rankings ==
Ranking movements Legend: ██ Increase in ranking ██ Decrease in ranking — = Not ranked RV = Received votes
	Week													
Poll	Pre	1	2	3	4	5	6	7	8	9	10	11	12	Final
AFCA	21	21*	RV	RV	—	—	—	—	—	—	—	—	—	—
D2 Football	16	15	—	—	—	—	—	—	—	—	—	—	—	—

* A new poll was not released for this week, so for comparison purposes, the previous week's ranking is inserted in this week's slot.

== Personnel ==
2024 UT Permian Basin Falcons football team roster
Players
Coaches
Offense

Pos.	#	Name	Class
WR	0	La'Quan Wells	Sr
WR	1	Jeremiah Cooley	GS
WR	2	Traylen Suel	So
QB	3	Dylan Graham (injured)	GS
RB	5	Kory Harris	Jr
QB	7	Kai Kunz	So
WR	10	Ben Patterson	Jr
WR	13	Gunnar Abseck	GS
WR	14	Deon Cook	Sr
QB	15	Christian Kaopuka	Jr
QB	15	Issac Mooring	Fr
WR	18	Ja'Juan Mason	Sr
RB	25	Camden Tyler	So
RB	33	Taj Crenshaw	GS
RB	34	Gerald Palmer	Jr
TE	40	Kelby Castro	Fr
TE	44	Brock Johnson	Sr
OL	50	Tyler Bell	Jr
OL	51	Mekhi Pinckney	Sr
OL	52	Max Johnson	GS
OL	53	Chrishoun Roberts	Jr
OL	54	Andrew Ena	Jr
OL	59	Tristin Willis	GS
OL	60	Christopher Jernigan	Fr
OL	61	Donavon Kapa	Fr
OL	62	Collins Ihejiawu	Fr
OL	64	David Baker	Fr
OL	65	Case Carpenter	Fr
OL	66	Girevis Bobey	Fr
OL	67	Stavien Robertson	Fr
OL	68	Ivan Schultz	Jr
OL	70	Mason Schweinle	So
OL	71	Christian Crockett	Fr
OL	72	Lucas Barrientes	Fr
OL	73	Nigel Wallace	Fr
OL	75	Wyatt Payne	Fr
OL	76	Brandon Jones	Jr
OL	77	Ramon Diaz	Sr
OL	78	Nour Chirchi	Jr
WR	80	Josh Bolden	Sr
WR	81	Crimson Mathis	Fr
WR	82	Jace Wyatt	Jr
WR	83	Heston Kelly	So
TE	85	Jaron Hendricks	Jr
TE	86	Landon Ross	Fr
TE	87	Brad Adamcik	Jr
WR	88	Josh Little	Jr
WR	89	Marcus Molina	Sr
WR		Clyde Bellow	Sr
TE		Blaize Covington	Fr
QB		Logan Cundiff	Fr
WR		Carmine Elisarraz	Fr
WR		Keo Fleeks	Fr
WR		Justin Herman	Fr
RB		Juzstyce Lara	Fr
QB		Cheno Navarrette	Fr
QB		Colton Newsom	Fr
TE		Geoffrey Ojeh	Fr
RB		Brylee Perez	Fr
WR		Marquise Price	Fr
RB		Tim Saunders	Fr
WR		Brex Stevens	Fr
WR		Jailen Toure	Fr
WR		Even Williams	So
WR		Ilijah Williams	So

Defense

Pos.	#	Name	Class
DL	0	Malik Allen	Sr
LB	1	Jalon Rocquemore	Sr
DL	2	Jalen Williams	Jr
LB	4	Tristan Exline	So
DL	5	Frank Mulipola	Jr
DB	6	Jalani Jefferson	Jr
DB	7	Kharel Coney	Jr
DB	8	Kamron Lee	Jr
DB	9	Kendrick Jones	So
LB	11	Austin Cumpton	Fr
DB	16	Datron Brooks	Jr
DB	17	Colby Calvin	GS
DB	19	Keltrick Britford	Jr
DB	19	Chanlor Johnson	GS
DB	20	Dante Heaggens	Jr
LB	22	Caleb Pierson	So
DB	23	Churchill Williams	Jr
DB	24	Jamarion Ravenell	So
DB	26	Major Spencer	Fr
DB	27	Ashton Hamby	Sr
DB	28	B. J. Westmoreland	Sr
DB	29	Euvoski Cunningham	Jr
DB	30	Ife Current	So
DB	32	Champ Mathis	Sr
LB	35	Eric Franco	Jr
DL	36	Luke Miller	Fr
DB	38	Jamar Roberson	Fr
DB	40	Ryan Cain	Fr
DB	41	Elijah Gerrard	Fr
DL	42	Will LeBlanc	Fr
LB	43	Tre Yanez	Fr
DL	45	Myles Williams	Jr
DL	46	Kaiden Bates	Fr
DL	46	Kobe Burton	Fr
LB	47	Sean Burks	So
LB	49	Chase Brown	Fr
DL	55	Darius Keck	Jr
DL	56	Sione Teuhema	Jr
LB	57	Tyler Manoy	Fr
DL	58	Jordan Lynch	Fr
DB	84	Jonathan Brown	Fr
DL	90	John Baldwin	Fr
DL	91	Austin Williams	Jr
DL	93	Dieunerst Collin	Jr
DL	94	Gary Holmes	Jr
DL	95	Malik Cousin	Fr
DL	95	Chris Harris	Sr
DL	96	Tola Daranijo	Jr
DL	97	Yemi Oyesanya	Sr
DL	98	Jacob Humphrey	Jr
DL	99	Amari Bedford	Jr
DB		Dawson Bullard	Fr
DB		Nicholas Butler	Fr
LB		Devin green	Fr
DL		Emmanuel Lawton	Fr
DB		Kam Oliver	Fr
DB		Dami Oluwoleajayi	GS
DL		Jordan Omolola	Fr
DB		Dontay Thomas	Fr
DB		David Vah	Fr

Special teams

Pos.	#	Name	Class
LS	37	Grant Gensemer	Sr
K	41	Angel Diaz	Fr
K, P	48	Rafael Vargas	Sr
K, P	63	Gabriel Ogura	Fr
LS		Tye Rybarski	Fr
K		Lucas Stringfield	Fr

Head coach

- Kris McCullough

Coordinators/assistant coaches

- Tommy Crayton
  Assistant head coach/Tackles and tight ends
- Blake Crandall
  Co-offensive coordinator/Wide receivers
- Kenny Hrncir
  Co-offensive coordinator/Quarterbacks
- Jake Shaw
  Defensive coordinator
- Devin Gaulden
  Co-defensive coordinator/Secondary
- Zach Santolla
  Defensive line/Run game coordinator
- Spencer Region
  Interior offensive line
- Marquez Gollman
  Safeties
- Hayden Kelly
  Linebackers
- Mathew Zubiate
  Running backs

Legend

- (C) Team captain
- (S) Suspended
- (I) Ineligible
- Injured
- Redshirt

Roster
Last update: August 19, 2024

== Game summaries ==
=== Western New Mexico ===
Western New Mexico Mustangs at No. 21 UT Permian Basin Falcons – Game summary

Quarter	1	2	3	4	Total
Mustangs	0	3	0	0	3
No. 21 Falcons	3	11	10	17	41

at Ratliff Stadium, Odessa, Texas

- Date: August 31
- Game time: 6:00 p.m. CDT
- Game weather: Cloudy
- Game attendance: 2,573
- Referee: Daniel Mena
- TV announcers (FloSports): Monty Montgomery and Ben Farmer
- Box score, Recap

Game information
First quarter
- UTPB – Angel Diaz 47-yard field goal, 7:46. Falcons 3–0. Drive: 17 plays, 48 yards, 7:14.

Second quarter

- UTPB – Jeremiah Cooley 22-yard pass from Dylan Graham (Gunnar Abseck run), 7:23. Falcons 11–0. Drive: 11 plays, 63 yards, 5:20.
- WNM – Zach Gordan 40-yard field goal, 3:16. Falcons 11–3. Drive: 10 plays, 43 yards, 3:58.
- UTPB – Angel Diaz 32-yard field goal, 0:25. Falcons 14–3. Drive: 12 plays, 50 yards, 2:51.

Third quarter

- UTPB – Ben Patterson 83-yard pass from Dylan Graham (Angel Diaz kick), 12:06. Falcons 21–3. Drive: 2 plays, 90 yards, 0:43.
- UTPB – Angel Diaz 36-yard field goal, 2:41. Falcons 24–3. Drive: 15 plays, 73 yards, 7:09.

Fourth quarter

- UTPB – Angel Diaz 25-yard field goal, 8:32. Falcons 27–3. Drive: 7 plays, 19 yards, 3:03.
- UTPB – Laquan Wells 8-yard pass from Dylan Graham (Angel Diaz kick), 6:47. Falcons 34–3. Drive: 3 plays, 28 yards, 0:53.
- UTPB – Kory Harris 3-yard run (Angel Diaz kick), 3:54. Falcons 41–3. Drive: 6 plays, 32 yards, 2:10.

Statistics	WNM	UTPB
First downs	5	29
Total yards	118	557
Rushing yards	51	137
Passing yards	67	420
Turnovers	0	0
Time of possession	21:33	38:27

Team	Category	Player	Statistics
Western New Mexico	Passing	Josh Magana	11/19, 60 yards
Western New Mexico	Rushing	Gabe Levy	7 rushes, 25 yards
Western New Mexico	Receiving	Deuce Zimmerman	2 receptions, 46 yards
UT Permian Basin	Passing	Dylan Graham	31/50, 404 yards, 3 TD
UT Permian Basin	Rushing	Kory Harris	21 rushes, 82 yards, TD
UT Permian Basin	Receiving	Jeremiah Cooley	8 receptions, 116 yards, TD

=== At CSU Pueblo ===
No. 21 UT Permian Basin Falcons at CSU Pueblo ThunderWolves – Game summary

Quarter	1	2	3	4	Total
No. 21 Falcons	9	0	7	7	23
ThunderWolves	20	9	0	11	40

at ThunderBowl, Pueblo, Colorado

- Date: September 7
- Game time: 7:00 p.m. CDT/6:00 p.m. MDT
- Game weather: Sunny, 86 °F (30 °C)
- Game attendance: 6,447
- Referee: Charles Flinn
- TV announcers (RMAC Network): Tony Wright and Tracy Renck
- Box score, Recap

Game information
First quarter
- UTPB – Jeremiah Cooley 66-yard pass from Dylan Graham (Angel Diaz kick), 13:27. Falcons 7–0. Drive: 1 play, 66 yards, 0:10.
- CSUP – Reggie Retzlaff 70-yard pass from Devin Larsen (kick blocked), 13:12. Falcons 7–6. Drive: 1 play, 70 yards, 0:08.
- UTPB – Kamron Lee 98-yard PAT return, 13:12. Falcons 9–6.
- CSUP – Reggie Retzlaff 32-yard pass from Devin Larsen (Evan Lyons kick), 8:11. ThunderWolves 13–9. Drive: 1 play, 27 yards, 0:05.
- CSUP – Keith McKaney 48-yard interception return (Evan Lyons kick), 6:57. ThunderWolves 20–9.

Second quarter

- CSUP – Howard Russell 46-yard run (kick blocked), 14:44. ThunderWolves 26–9. Drive: 3 plays, 67 yards, 1:24.
- CSUP – Evan Lyons 22-yard field goal, 5:11. ThunderWolves 29–9. Drive: 8 plays, 55 yards, 4:23.

Third quarter

- UTPB – Jeremiah Cooley 1-yard pass from Dylan Graham (Angel Diaz kick), 1:29. ThunderWolves 29–16. Drive: 15 plays, 80 yards, 5:43.

Fourth quarter

- CSUP – Taylor Tosches 4-yard pass from Devin Larsen (Curtis Luckadoo run), 9:19. ThunderWolves 37–16. Drive: 10 plays, 63 yards, 4:13.
- UTPB – Kory Harris 1-yard run (Angel Diaz kick), 5:07. ThunderWolves 37–23. Drive: 13 plays, 87 yards, 4:06.
- CSUP – Evan Lyons 27-yard field goal, 1:45. ThunderWolves 40–23. Drive: 7 plays, 34 yards, 3:21.

Statistics	UTPB	CSUP
First downs	26	15
Total yards	331	413
Rushing yards	128	126
Passing yards	203	287
Turnovers	2	1
Time of possession	36:01	23:59

Team	Category	Player	Statistics
UT Permian Basin	Passing	Dylan Graham	16/37, 203 yards, 2 TD, 2 INT
UT Permian Basin	Rushing	Kory Harris	28 rushes, 96 yards, TD
UT Permian Basin	Receiving	Jeremiah Cooley	5 receptions, 89 yards, 2 TD
CSU Pueblo	Passing	Devin Larsen	21/35, 287 yards, 3 TD, INT
CSU Pueblo	Rushing	Howard Russell V	15 rushes, 102 yards, TD
CSU Pueblo	Receiving	Reggie Retzlaff	7 receptions, 164 yards, 2 TD

=== Adams State ===
Adams State Grizzlies at UT Permian Basin Falcons – Game summary

Quarter	1	2	3	4	Total
Grizzlies	0	0	14	0	14
Falcons	22	10	21	14	67

at Astound Broadband Stadium, Midland, Texas

- Date: September 14
- Game time: 6:00 p.m. CDT
- Game weather: Cloudy
- Game attendance: 7,749
- Referee: Xavier Velazquez
- TV: FloSports
- Box score, Recap

Game information
First quarter
- UTPB – Gerard Palmer 3-yard run (Dylan Graham pass to Jalen Williams), 12:38. Falcons 8–0. Drive: 6 plays, 69 yards, 2:17.
- UTPB – Brock Johnson 13-yard pass from Dylan Graham (Angel Diaz kick), 7:06. Falcons 15–0. Drive: 8 plays, 72 yards, 2:44.
- UTPB – Kory Harris 1-yard run (Angel Diaz kick), 1:59. Falcons 22–0. Drive: 8 plays, 78 yards, 2:55.

Second quarter

- UTPB – Angel Diaz 37-yard field goal, 9:08. Falcons 25–0. Drive: 11 plays, 43 yards, 4:22.
- UTPB – Jeremiah Cooley 1-yard pass from Dylan Graham (Angel Diaz kick), 2:00. Falcons 32–0. Drive: 8 plays, 27 yards, 3:24.

Third quarter

- ASU – Ahmare Merrida 43-yard pass from Chase Nelson (Brysen Gardner kick), 12:18. Falcons 32–7. Drive: 4 plays, 75 yards, 2:42.
- UTPB – Traylen Suel 96-yard kickoff return (Angel Diaz kick), 12:05. Falcons 39–7.
- UTPB – Traylen Suel 47-yard pass from Dylan Graham (Angel Diaz kick), 10:13. Falcons 46–7. Drive: 1 play, 47 yards, 0:08.
- UTPB – Kory Harris 20-yard run (Angel Diaz kick), 6:15. Falcons 53–7. Drive: 7 plays, 65 yards, 2:50.
- ASU – Noel Moreno 12-yard pass from Alexander Grado (Brysen Gardner kick), 0:44. Falcons 53–14. Drive: 5 plays, 80 yards, 2:01.

Fourth quarter

- UTPB – Laquan Wells 17-yard pass from Dylan Graham (Angel Diaz kick), 14:53. Falcons 60–14. Drive: 4 plays, 68 yards, 0:44.
- UTPB – Camden Tyler 2-yard run (Angel Diaz kick), 11:24. Falcons 67–14. Drive: 7 plays, 56 yards, 1:51.

Statistics	ASU	UTPB
First downs	17	31
Total yards	225	612
Rushing yards	92	306
Passing yards	133	306
Turnovers	2	1
Time of possession	29:28	30:32

Team	Category	Player	Statistics
Adams State	Passing	Chase Nelson	9/20, 84 yards, TD, INT
Adams State	Rushing	Ahmare Merrida	18 rushes, 55 yards
Adams State	Receiving	Ahmare Merrida	3 receptions, 48 yards, TD
UT Permian Basin	Passing	Dylan Graham	15/24, 272 yards, 4 TD
UT Permian Basin	Rushing	Kory Harris	24 rushes, 155 yards, 2 TD
UT Permian Basin	Receiving	Ja'Juan Mason	3 receptions, 72 yards

=== Texas A&M–Kingsville ===
Texas A&M–Kingsville Javelinas at UT Permian Basin Falcons – Game summary

Quarter	1	2	3	4	Total
Javelinas	10	7	0	3	20
Falcons	0	7	7	0	14

at Astound Broadband Stadium, Midland, Texas

- Date: September 21
- Game time: 6:00 p.m. CDT
- Game weather: Sunny
- Game attendance: 5,825
- Referee: Kenny Kelarek
- TV: FloSports
- Box score, Recap

Game information
First quarter
- AMK – Gilbert Garza 49-yard field goal, 8:58. Javelinas 3–0. Drive: 8 plays, 33 yards, 4:44.
- AMK – C. J. Thompson 28-yard pass from Teague Sedtal (Gilbert Garza kick), 4:19. Javelinas 10–0. Drive: 8 plays, 55 yards, 3:39.

Second quarter

- AMK – Teague Sedtal 2-yard run (Gilbert Garza kick), 10:12. Javelinas 17–0. Drive: 10 plays, 99 yards, 4:40.
- UTPB – Kory Harris 23-yard pass from Dylan Graham (Angel Diaz kick), 1:47. Javelinas 17–7. Drive: 4 plays, 42 yards, 0:44.

Third quarter

- UTPB – Ben Patterson 71-yard pass from Dylan Graham (Angel Diaz kick), 11:29. Javelinas 17–14. Drive: 3 plays, 80 yards, 1:08.

Fourth quarter

- AMK – Gilbert Garza 34-yard field goal, 12:14. Javelinas 20–14. Drive: 8 plays, 62 yards, 3:30.

Statistics	AMK	UTPB
First downs	19	19
Total yards	321	290
Rushing yards	125	46
Passing yards	196	244
Turnovers	0	1
Time of possession	35:22	24:38

Team	Category	Player	Statistics
Texas A&M–Kingsville	Passing	Teague Sedtal	15/24, 196 yards, TD
Texas A&M–Kingsville	Rushing	Roger Hagan	27 rushes, 116 yards
Texas A&M–Kingsville	Receiving	Jackson Allen	3 receptions, 57 yards
UT Permian Basin	Passing	Dylan Graham	17/37, 244 yards, 2 TD, INT
UT Permian Basin	Rushing	Kory Harris	18 rushes, 41 yards
UT Permian Basin	Receiving	Ben Patterson	3 receptions, 75 yards, TD

=== At Midwestern State ===
UT Permian Basin Falcons at Midwestern State Mustangs – Game summary

Quarter	1	2	3	4	Total
Falcons	10	7	7	3	27
Mustangs	0	3	0	0	3

at Memorial Stadium, Wichita Falls, Texas

- Date: September 28
- Game time: 7:00 p.m. CDT
- Game weather: Sunny
- Game attendance: 6,127
- Referee: Jason Hickey
- TV: FloSports
- Box score, Recap

Game information
First quarter
- UTPB – Ja'Juan Mason 58-yard pass from Dylan Graham (Angel Diaz kick), 9:04. Falcons 7–0. Drive: 4 plays, 72 yards, 1:35.
- UTPB – Angel Diaz 27-yard field goal, 2:04. Falcons 10–0. Drive: 11 plays, 63 yards, 4:52.

Second quarter

- UTPB – Laquan Wells 18-yard pass from Dylan Graham (Angel Diaz kick), 9:03. Falcons 17–0. Drive: 8 plays, 40 yards, 3:11.
- MSU – Joseph Carlson 26-yard field goal, 6:13. Falcons 17–3. Drive: 6 plays, 36 yards, 2:48.

Third quarter

- UTPB – Gerard Palmer 4-yard run (Angel Diaz kick), 3:43. Falcons 24–3. Drive: 11 plays, 59 yards, 5:56.

Fourth quarter

- UTPB – Angel Diaz 31-yard field goal, 13:34. Falcons 27–3. Drive: 8 plays, 57 yards, 1:47.

Statistics	UTPB	MSU
First downs	28	16
Total yards	441	253
Rushing yards	199	89
Passing yards	242	164
Turnovers	1	2
Time of possession	33:11	26:49

Team	Category	Player	Statistics
UT Permian Basin	Passing	Dylan Graham	23/45, 242 yards, 2 TD, INT
UT Permian Basin	Rushing	Kory Harris	22 rushes, 147 yards
UT Permian Basin	Receiving	Ja'Juan Mason	3 receptions, 104 yards, TD
Midwestern State	Passing	Sean Jastrab	11/20, 94 yards, INT
Midwestern State	Rushing	Devin Cross	12 rushes, 91 yards
Midwestern State	Receiving	Justin White	7 receptions, 55 yards

=== Angelo State ===
Angelo State Rams at UT Permian Basin Falcons – Game summary

Quarter	1	2	3	4	Total
Rams	0	15	7	14	36
Falcons	0	0	0	7	7

at Astound Broadband Stadium, Midland, Texas

- Date: October 5
- Game time: 6:00 p.m. CDT
- Game weather: Sunny
- Game attendance: 5,629
- Referee: Joshua Bannerman
- TV: FloSports
- Box score, Recap

Game information
First quarter
- No scoring plays

Second quarter

- ASU – Kenton Allen 5-yard fumble return (Bradley Larson kick), 6:04. Rams 7–0.
- ASU – Brayden Wilcox 6-yard pass from Braeden Fuller (Braeden Fuller pass to Alex Wyatt), 0:47. Rams 15–0. Drive: 7 plays, 65 yards, 3:04.

Third quarter

- ASU – Braeden Fuller 86-yard run (Bradley Larson kick), 12:07. Rams 22–0. Drive: 1 play, 86 yards, 0:13.

Fourth quarter

- ASU – Braeden Fuller 2-yard run (Bradley Larson kick), 11:54. Rams 29–0. Drive: 14 plays, 70 yards, 7:25.
- UTPB – Ben Patterson 38-yard pass from Issac Mooring (Rafael Vargas kick), 5:45. Rams 29–7. Drive: 6 plays, 59 yards, 1:39.
- ASU – Braeden Fuller 4-yard run (Bradley Larson kick), 1:52. Rams 36–7. Drive: 7 plays, 48 yards, 3:53.

Statistics	ASU	UTPB
First downs	14	14
Total yards	280	277
Rushing yards	168	108
Passing yards	112	169
Turnovers	1	2
Time of possession	28:05	31:55

Team	Category	Player	Statistics
Angelo State	Passing	Braeden Fuller	9/15, 112 yards, TD
Angelo State	Rushing	Braeden Fuller	15 rushes, 146 yards, 3 TD
Angelo State	Receiving	Corey Sandolph	2 receptions, 43 yards
UT Permian Basin	Passing	Issac Mooring	7/17, 113 yards, TD
UT Permian Basin	Rushing	Kory Harris	18 rushes, 61 yards
UT Permian Basin	Receiving	Deon Cook	4 receptions, 53 yards

Starting quarterback Dylan Graham was injured early in the game, with Christian Kaopua coming in before he was replaced by Issac Mooring. At a press conference the following Monday, head coach Kris McCulloch announced that Graham would be out for the rest of the season with a lower body injury.

=== At No. 9 Central Washington ===
UT Permian Basin Falcons at No. 9 Central Washington Wildcats – Game summary

Quarter	1	2	3	4	Total
Falcons	0	0	7	7	14
No. 9 Wildcats	7	0	6	0	13

at Tomlinson Stadium, Ellensburg, Washington

- Date: October 12
- Game time: 8:00 p.m. CDT/6:00 p.m. PDT
- Game weather: Sunny, 65 °F (18 °C)
- Game attendance: 5,112
- Referee: Tracy Hernandez
- TV: FloSports
- Box score, Recap

Game information
First quarter
- CWU – Kennedy McGill 11-yard run (Wyatt Redding kick), 8:16. Wildcats 7–0. Drive: 12 plays, 50 yards, 6:32.

Second quarter

- No scoring plays

Third quarter

- UTPB – Issac Mooring 2-yard run (Angel Diaz kick), 9:45. Tied 7–7. Drive: 10 plays, 65 yards, 5:15.
- CWU – Kennedy McGill 9-yard run (kick failed), 3:07. Wildcats 13–7. Drive: 10 plays, 60 yards, 6:31.

Fourth quarter

- UTPB – Issac Mooring 2-yard run (Angel Diaz kick), 11:42. Falcons 14–13. Drive: 15 plays, 85 yards, 6:19.

Statistics	UTPB	CWU
First downs	18	16
Total yards	227	285
Rushing yards	120	225
Passing yards	107	60
Turnovers	1	2
Time of possession	27:40	32:20

Team	Category	Player	Statistics
UT Permian Basin	Passing	Issac Mooring	12/24, 107 yards, INT
UT Permian Basin	Rushing	Issac Mooring	16 rushes, 55 yards, 2 TD
UT Permian Basin	Receiving	Deon Cook	5 receptions, 41 yards
Central Washington	Passing	Kennedy McGill	5/13, 51 yards, INT
Central Washington	Rushing	Kennedy McGill	19 rushes, 138 yards, 2 TD
Central Washington	Receiving	Darius Morrison	2 receptions, 30 yards

=== Western Oregon ===
Western Oregon Wolves at UT Permian Basin Falcons – Game summary

Quarter	1	2	3	4	OT	Total
Wolves	0	20	0	7	3	30
Falcons	14	0	6	7	0	27

at Astound Broadband Stadium, Midland, Texas

- Date: October 19
- Game time: 6:00 p.m. CDT
- Game weather: Cloudy
- Game attendance: 3,515
- Referee: Eric Stern
- TV: FloSports
- Box score, Recap

Game information
First quarter
- UTPB – Deon Cook 12-yard pass from Issac Mooring (Angel Diaz kick), 13:23. Falcons 7–0. Drive: 3 plays, 67 yards, 1:31.
- UTPB – Kory Harris 5-yard run (Angel Diaz kick), 7:00. Falcons 14–0. Drive: 7 plays, 40 yards, 2:52.

Second quarter

- WOU – Damon Hickok 51-yard pass from Jordan McCarty (Keaton Emmett kick), 13:32. Falcons 14–7. Drive: 10 plays, 99 yards, 5:16.
- WOU – Keyvaun Eady 9-yard pass from Kainoa Jones (Keaton Emmett kick), 7:01. Tied 14–14. Drive: 9 plays, 65 yards, 5:35.
- WOU – Keaton Emmett 42-yard field goal, 1:54. Wolves 17–14. Drive: 8 plays, 34 yards, 3:19.
- WOU – Keaton Emmett 48-yard field goal, 0:00. Wolves 20–14. Drive: 5 plays, 23 yards, 1:00.

Third quarter

- UTPB – Camden Tyler 36-yard run (kick failed), 4:26. Tied 20–20. Drive: 3 plays, 69 yards, 0:52.

Fourth quarter

- UTPB – Gunnar Abseck 40-yard pass from Issac Mooring (Angel Diaz kick), 11:30. Falcons 27–20. Drive: 7 plays, 55 yards, 3:30.
- WOU – Jordan McCarty 3-yard run (Keaton Emmett kick), 2:48. Tied 27–27. Drive: 8 plays, 44 yards, 3:41.

Overtime

- WOU – Keaton Emmett 29-yard field goal. Wolves 30–27. Drive: 7 plays, 14 yards.

Statistics	WOU	UTPB
First downs	24	14
Total yards	342	302
Rushing yards	212	105
Passing yards	130	197
Turnovers	0	1
Time of possession	40:59	19:01

Team	Category	Player	Statistics
Western Oregon	Passing	Jordan McCarty	8/12, 71 yards, TD
Western Oregon	Rushing	Dominique Loggins	25 rushes, 137 yards
Western Oregon	Receiving	Damon Hickok	5 receptions, 72 yards, TD
UT Permian Basin	Passing	Issac Mooring	15/31, 197 yards, 2 TD, INT
UT Permian Basin	Rushing	Kory Harris	11 rushes, 45 yards, TD
UT Permian Basin	Receiving	Gunnar Abseck	4 receptions, 80 yards, TD

=== At West Texas A&M ===
UT Permian Basin Falcons at West Texas A&M Buffaloes – Game summary

Quarter	1	2	3	4	Total
Falcons	14	7	0	0	21
Buffaloes	7	0	0	0	7

at Bain–Schaeffer Buffalo Stadium, Canyon, Texas

- Date: October 26
- Game time: 7:00 p.m. CDT
- Game weather: Sunny
- Game attendance: 6,131
- Referee: Royce Smith
- TV: FloSports
- Box score, Recap

Game information
First quarter
- UTPB – Ben Patterson 54-yard pass from Issac Mooring (Angel Diaz kick), 12:51. Falcons 7–0. Drive: 2 plays, 55 yards, 0:34.
- WT – Zorian Stanton 33-yard pass from Kanon Gibson (Cason Polivoda kick), 10:46. Tied 7–7. Drive: 5 plays, 75 yards, 2:05.
- UTPB – Tyler Cleveland 17-yard run (Angel Diaz kick), 5:50. Falcons 14–7. Drive: 12 plays, 63 yards, 4:49.

Second quarter

- UTPB – Issac Mooring 3-yard run (Angel Diaz kick), 12:22. Falcons 21–7. Drive: 7 plays, 92 yards, 3:50.

Third quarter

- No scoring plays

Fourth quarter

- No scoring plays

Statistics	UTPB	WT
First downs	19	18
Total yards	395	316
Rushing yards	185	98
Passing yards	210	218
Turnovers	0	3
Time of possession	33:48	26:12

Team	Category	Player	Statistics
UT Permian Basin	Passing	Issac Mooring	11/20, 210 yards, TD
UT Permian Basin	Rushing	Tyler Cleveland	16 rushes, 87 yards, TD
UT Permian Basin	Receiving	Ben Patterson	4 receptions, 161 yards, TD
West Texas A&M	Passing	Kanon Gibson	17/28, 218 yards, TD, 2 INT
West Texas A&M	Rushing	Tre'Jon Henderson	13 rushes, 53 yards
West Texas A&M	Receiving	Tucker Swoboda	6 receptions, 115 yards

=== At Eastern New Mexico ===
UT Permian Basin Falcons at Eastern New Mexico Greyhounds – Game summary

Quarter	1	2	3	4	Total
Falcons	15	14	14	21	64
Greyhounds	7	0	0	7	14

at Steve Loy Family Foundation Stadium, Portales, New Mexico

- Date: November 9
- Game time: 1:00 p.m. CST/12:00 p.m. MST
- Game weather: Sunny, 51 °F (11 °C)
- Game attendance: 2,208
- Referee: Duane Martin
- TV: FloSports
- Box score, Recap

Game information
First quarter
- UTPB – Brock Johnson 7-yard pass from Issac Mooring (Angel Diaz kick), 10:22. Falcons 7–0. Drive: 12 plays, 68 yards, 4:38.
- UTPB – Kory Harris 2-yard run (Issac Mooring pass to Brock Johnson), 0:58. Falcons 15–0. Drive: 12 plays, 80 yards, 5:31.
- ENM – Ron Craten 1-yard run (Kaden Bell kick), 0:23. Falcons 15–7. Drive: 2 plays, 72 plays, 0:35.

Second quarter

- UTPB – Camden Tyler 39-yard run (Angel Diaz kick), 8:55. Falcons 22–7. Drive: 3 plays, 53 yards, 0:39.
- UTPB – Tyler Cleveland 1-yard run (Angel Diaz kick), 3:44. Falcons 29–7. Drive: 5 plays, 37 yards, 1:56.

Third quarter

- UTPB – Deon Cook 27-yard pass from Issac Mooring (Angel Diaz kick), 11:36. Falcons 36–7. Drive: 4 plays, 52 yards, 1:19.
- UTPB – Jeremiah Cooley 19-yard pass from Issac Mooring (Angel Diaz kick), 9:22. Falcons 43–7. Drive: 1 play, 19 yards, 0:07.

Fourth quarter

- UTPB – Kory Harris 1-yard run (Angel Diaz kick), 4:17. Falcons 50–7. Drive: 15 plays, 70 yards, 5:41.
- ENM – Dalton Flowers 60-yard pass from Chad Ragle (Kaden Bell kick), 2:57. Falcons 50–14. Drive: 3 plays, 63 yards, 1:15.
- UTPB – Jeremiah Cooley 65-yard pass from Christian Kaopua (Angel Diaz kick), 2:40. Falcons 57–14. Drive: 1 play, 65 yards, 0:10.
- UTPB – Tyler Cleveland 73-yard run (Angel Diaz kick), 1:26. Falcons 64–14. Drive: 1 play, 73 yards, 0:12.

Statistics	UTPB	ENM
First downs	29	8
Total yards	575	245
Rushing yards	271	166
Passing yards	304	79
Turnovers	1	2
Time of possession	29:41	30:19

Team	Category	Player	Statistics
UT Permian Basin	Passing	Issac Mooring	23/31, 222 yards, 3 TD
UT Permian Basin	Rushing	Tyler Cleveland	8 rushes, 115 yards, 2 TD
UT Permian Basin	Receiving	Jeremiah Cooley	4 receptions, 106 yards, 2 TD
Eastern New Mexico	Passing	Chad Ragle	1/1, 60 yards, TD
Eastern New Mexico	Rushing	Rashad Carter	8 rushes, 85 yards
Eastern New Mexico	Receiving	Dalton Flowers	1 reception, 60 yards, TD

=== At Sul Ross ===
UT Permian Basin Falcons at Sul Ross Lobos – Game summary

Quarter	1	2	3	4	Total
Falcons	28	20	14	13	75
Lobos	0	0	7	0	7

at Jackson Field, Alpine, Texas

- Date: November 16
- Game time: 12:00 p.m. CST
- Game weather: Sunny, 78 °F (26 °C)
- Game attendance: 200
- Referee: Neil Dilts
- TV: FloSports
- Box score, Recap

Game information
First quarter
- UTPB – Deon Cook 77-yard pass from Issac Mooring (Gunnar Abseck run), 14:42. Falcons 8–0. Drive: 1 play, 77 yards, 0:13.
- UTPB – Kory Harris 1-yard run (pass failed), 10:11. Falcons 14–0. Drive: 8 plays, 59 yards, 2:43.
- UTPB – Jeremiah Cooley 4-yard pass from Issac Mooring (Rafael Vargas kick), 5:08. Falcons 21–0. Drive: 7 plays, 60 yards, 3:04.
- UTPB – Jeremiah Cooley 11-yard pass from Issac Mooring (Rafael Vargas kick), 0:39. Falcons 28–0. Drive: 5 plays, 61 yards, 2:23.

Second quarter

- UTPB – Deon Cook 9-yard pass from Issac Mooring (kick failed), 12:09. Falcons 34–0. Drive: 6 plays, 80 yards, 2:05.
- UTPB – Kory Harris 11-yard run (Angel Diaz kick), 3:54. Falcons 41–0. Drive: 12 plays, 80 yards, 5:18.
- UTPB – Ben Patterson 6-yard pass from Issac Mooring (Angel Diaz kick), 1:25. Falcons 48–0. Drive: 6 plays, 22 yards, 1:33.

Third quarter

- UTPB – Kory Harris 28-yard run (Angel Diaz kick), 11:20. Falcons 55–0. Drive: 6 plays, 50 yards, 2:17.
- UTPB – Ashton Hamby 25-yard fumble return (Angel Diaz kick), 11:04. Falcons 62–0.
- SRS – Gunner Hammond 4-yard run (Carlos Arreola kick), 4:02. Falcons 62–7. Drive: 11 plays, 75 yards, 7:02.

Fourth quarter

- UTPB – Kory Harris 53-yard run (kick failed), 12:26. Falcons 68–7. Drive: 3 plays, 61 yards, 0:53.
- UTPB – Christian Kaopua 7-yard run (Angel Diaz kick), 8:24. Falcons 75–7. Drive: 5 plays, 42 yards, 3:46.

Statistics	UTPB	SRS
First downs	34	15
Total yards	711	231
Rushing yards	318	70
Passing yards	393	161
Turnovers	0	3
Time of possession	33:16	26:44

Team	Category	Player	Statistics
UT Permian Basin	Passing	Issac Mooring	26/28, 353 yards, 5 TD
UT Permian Basin	Rushing	Kory Harris	26 rushes, 201 yards, 4 TD
UT Permian Basin	Receiving	Deon Cook	6 receptions, 148 yards, 2 TD
Sul Ross	Passing	Tucker Bridwell	8/21, 123 yards, 2 INT
Sul Ross	Rushing	Kye Callicoatte	9 rushes, 27 yards
Sul Ross	Receiving	Nathan Crawford	3 receptions, 72 yards

=== Vs. No. 25 Central Missouri (Heritage Bowl) ===
2024 Heritage Bowl
No. 25 Central Missouri Mules vs. UT Permian Basin Falcons – Game summary

Quarter	1	2	3	4	OT	2OT	Total
No. 25 Mules	7	7	0	14	3	8	39
Falcons	7	13	8	0	3	6	37

at Tiger Stadium, Corsicana, Texas

- Date: December 7
- Game time: 12:00 p.m. CDT
- Game weather: Cloudy, 49 °F (9 °C)
- Game attendance: 3,500
- Referee: Jerry Springer
- Box score, Recap

Game information
First quarter
- UTPB – Jamarion Ravenell 55-yard interception return (Angel Diaz kick), 14:07. Falcons 7–0.
- UCM – Derrick Rose 24-yard pass from Zach Zebrowski (Brett Grupe kick), 1:12. Tied 7–7. Drive: 8 plays, 76 yards, 3:02.

Second quarter

- UTPB – Kory Harris 3-yard run (Angel Diaz kick), 10:32. Falcons 14–7. Drive: 14 plays, 95 yards, 5:40.
- UCM – Zach Zebrowski 5-yard run (Brett Grupe kick), 3:46. Tied 14–14. Drive: 10 plays, 88 yards, 4:23.
- UTPB – Deon Cook 35-yard pass from Issac Mooring (kick blocked), 0:25. Falcons 20–14. Drive: 10 plays, 76 yards, 3:21.

Third quarter

- UTPB – Kory Harris 1-yard run (Gunnar Abseck run), 0:35. Falcons 28–14. Drive: 7 plays, 70 yards, 2:50.

Fourth quarter

- UCM – Zach Zebrowski 2-yard run (Brett Grupe kick), 6:46. Falcons 28–21. Drive: 9 plays, 79 yards, 2:48.
- UCM – Derrick Rose 13-yard pass from Zach Zebrowski (Brett Grupe kick), 0:35. Tied 28–28. Drive: 14 plays, 94 yards, 5:11.

Overtime

- UCM – Brett Grupe 28-yard field goal. Mules 31–28. Drive: 8 plays, 14 yards.
- UTPB – Angel Diaz 43-yard field goal. Tied 31–31. Drive: 4 plays, -1 yards.

Second overtime

- UTPB – Deon Cook 12-yard pass from Issac Mooring (pass failed). Falcons 37–31. Drive: 2 plays, 25 yards.
- UCM – Zach Zebrowksi 1-yard run (Zach Zebrowski pass to Derrick Rose). Mules 39–37. Drive: 5 plays, 24 yards.

Statistics	UCM	UTPB
First downs	29	24
Total yards	438	431
Rushing yards	176	94
Passing yards	262	337
Turnovers	3	0
Time of possession	27:55	32:05

Team	Category	Player	Statistics
Central Missouri	Passing	Zach Zebrowski	20/47, 262 yards, 2 TD, 3 INT
Central Missouri	Rushing	Zach Zebrowski	29 rushes, 138 yards, 3 TD
Central Missouri	Receiving	Derrick Rose	6 receptions, 129 yards, 2 TD
UT Permian Basin	Passing	Issac Mooring	27/51, 337 yards, 2 TD
UT Permian Basin	Rushing	Kory Harris	19 rushes, 52 yards, 2 TD
UT Permian Basin	Receiving	Jeremiah Cooley	9 receptions, 125 yards

== Weekly awards ==
- LSC Offensive Player of the Week

Dylan Graham (week 2 vs. Adams State)

- LSC Defensive Player of the Week

Tristan Exline (week 0 vs. Western New Mexico)
Jalani Jefferson (week 6 vs. Central Washington)

- LSC Special Teams Player of the Week

Angel Diaz (week 0 vs. Western New Mexico)
Traylen Suel (week 2 vs. Adams State)
Rafael Vargas (week 4 vs. Midwestern State)
