= 2023 UT Permian Basin Falcons football team =

American college football season

2023 UT Permian Basin Falcons football

LSC champion

NCAA Division II First Round, L 3–10 vs. Bemidji State
- Conference: Lone Star Conference

Ranking
- AFCA: No. 18
- Record: 10–2 (8–0 LSC)
- Head coach: Kris McCullough (1st season)
- Offensive coordinator: Ryan Lusby (1st season)
- Co-offensive coordinator: Blake Crandall (1st season)
- Offensive scheme: Hurry-up, no-huddle spread
- Defensive coordinator: Dionte Dean (1st season)
- Base defense: 3–4/3–3–5 hybrid
- Home stadium: Astound Broadband Stadium; Ratliff Stadium

2023 Lone Star Conference football standings
	Conf.			Overall
Team	W		L	W		L
No. 18 UT Permian Basin $^	8	–	0	10	–	2
No. 17 Central Washington ^	7	–	1	9	–	4
Angelo State	6	–	2	7	–	3
Texas A&M–Kingsville	5	–	3	7	–	3
Midwestern State	3	–	5	4	–	6
Eastern New Mexico	2	–	6	5	–	6
West Texas A&M	2	–	6	3	–	7
Western Oregon	2	–	6	3	–	8
Western New Mexico	1	–	7	2	–	8
$ – Conference champion; ^ – NCAA Division II playoff participant; Rankings from AFCA poll

The 2023 UT Permian Basin Falcons football team represented the University of Texas Permian Basin (UTPB) in the 2023 NCAA Division II football season as a member of the Lone Star Conference (LSC). They were led by first-year head coach Kris McCullough. The Falcons finished the regular season 10–1, going 8–0 in LSC play to win the conference title for the first time in program history. The Falcons received a bid for the NCAA Division II playoffs for the first time in program history, being selected as the third seed in Super Region 4.

The Falcons played most of their home games at Astound Broadband Stadium in Midland, Texas while Ratliff Stadium in Odessa, Texas only hosted one home game.

== Offseason ==
=== Coaching changes ===
On November 28, 2022, head coach Justin Carrigan announced that he would be stepping down as the program's head coach. The following day it was announced he would be stepping into an administrative role, being named the university's deputy athletic director.

== Preseason ==
=== LSC media poll ===
The LSC media preseason poll was released on July 27, 2023. The Falcons were predicted to finish seventh.

== Season summary ==
The Falcons opened the season on September 2, hosting NAIA Texas College from the Sooner Athletic Conference. In McCullough's debut, UTPB won 96–0, breaking the program record for most points scored in a single game. Two weeks later, against Southwest Baptist of the Great Lakes Valley Conference, the Falcons defeated the Bearcats 86–7, the second-most points scored in a single game in program history. On September 30, the Falcons defeated no. 16 Texas A&M–Kingsville, 29–17, for the program's first win over a ranked opponent.

On October 14, the Falcons defeated Eastern New Mexico, 52–29, improving to 6–1 overall, breaking the program record for most wins in a single season. In the D2 Football poll released the following Monday, October 16, the Falcons were ranked no. 25, marking the first time in program history that the Falcons were ranked in a national poll. In the next game, on October 21, the Falcons defeated no. 19 Angelo State to improve to 5–0 in LSC play, breaking the program record for most conference wins in a season. The Falcons would be ranked in the AFCA poll released the following Monday, on October 23, at no. 22, marking the first time in program history that the Falcons were ranked in the AFCA poll. In the regular season finale the Falcons hosted the no. 23 Central Washington Wildcats with both teams entering the game with a 7–0 record in LSC play, meaning the winner of the game would win the conference title. UTPB won the game 42–14 to win the LSC title for the first time in program history. Head coach Kris McCullough was named LSC Coach of the Year while quarterback Kenny Hrncir was named LSC Offensive Player of the Year. Additionally, Jeremiah Cooley won Receiver of the Year, Dominique Varela won Defensive Lineman of the Year, and Hayden Kelly won Linebacker of the Year.

UT Permian Basin was selected for the Division II playoffs, marking the program's first appearance in the playoffs. The Falcons faced Bemidji State from the Northern Sun Intercollegiate Conference in the first round of the playoffs.

== Schedule ==
Date	Time	Opponent	Rank	Site	Result	Attendance
September 2	6:00 p.m.	Texas College*		Astound Broadband Stadium; Midland, TX	W 96–0	3,579
September 9	1:00 p.m.	at Western Colorado*		Mountaineer Bowl; Gunnison, CO	L 27–35	103
September 16	1:00 p.m.	at Southwest Baptist*		Plaster Stadium; Bolivar, MO	W 86–7	1,247
September 23	6:00 p.m.	West Texas A&M		Astound Broadband Stadium; Midland, TX	W 41–40 ^{OT}	7,018
September 30	6:00 p.m.	No. 16 Texas A&M–Kingsville		Ratliff Stadium; Odessa, TX	W 29–17	3,233
October 7	7:00 p.m.	at Midwestern State		Memorial Stadium; Wichita Falls, TX	W 21–13	6,122
October 14	6:00 p.m.	Eastern New Mexico		Astound Broadband Stadium; Midland, TX	W 52–29	1,792
October 21	6:00 p.m.	at No. 19 Angelo State		LeGrand Sports Complex; San Angelo, TX	W 28–23	4,828
October 28	6:00 p.m.	Western Oregon^{†}	No. 22	Astound Broadband Stadium; Midland, TX	W 28–16	5,127
November 4	1:00 p.m.	at Western New Mexico	No. 18	Altamirano Stadium; Silver City, NM	W 56–3	678
November 11	2:00 p.m.	No. 23 Central Washington	No. 17	Astound Broadband Stadium; Midland, TX	W 42–14	6,477
November 18	1:00 p.m.	No. 21 Bemidji State*	No. 12	Astound Broadband Stadium; Midland, TX (NCAA Division II First Round)	L 3–10	2,697
*Non-conference game; ^{†}Homecoming; Rankings from AFCA Poll released prior to the game; All times are in Central time

Schedule source:

== Rankings ==
Ranking movements Legend: ██ Increase in ranking ██ Decrease in ranking — = Not ranked RV = Received votes
	Week												
Poll	Pre	1	2	3	4	5	6	7	8	9	10	11	Final
AFCA	—	—	—	—	—	RV	RV	RV	22	18	17	12	18
D2 Football	—	—	—	—	—	—	—	25	19	18	16	10	17

== Personnel ==
2023 UT Permian Basin Falcons football team roster
Players
Coaches
Offense

Pos.	#	Name	Class
TE	1	Matt Zubiate	GS
WR	2	Marcus Molina	Jr
QB	3	Dylan Graham	Sr
WR	4	Jeremiah Cooley	Sr
RB	5	Kory Harris	So
WR	6	Clyde Bellow	Fr
QB	8	Kenny Hrncir	GS
WR	10	Laquan Wells	Jr
RB	11	Nemier Herod	Jr
WR	12	Calvin Littles	So
WR	12	Gunnar Abseck	Sr
WR	15	Traylen Suel	Fr
QB	16	Blake Flowers	Fr
QB	16	Suddin Sapien	Sr
QB	18	Keegan Byrd	Fr
RB	25	Camden Tyler	Fr
RB	33	Taj Crenshaw	Sr
RB	34	Gerald Palmer	So
TE	44	Brock Johnson	Jr
OL	50	Tyler Ball	Jr
OL	51	Heston Edwards	So
OL	52	Max Johnson	Sr
OL	53	Jayden Deemer	Fr
OL	55	Austin LaFavers	So
OL	59	Tristan Wells	Sr
OL	64	Reid Mitchell	Fr
OL	65	Andrew Johnson	So
OL	66	Tommy Medellin	Jr
OL	67	Jose Guerro	Fr
OL	68	Malik Davis	Sr
OL	69	Nigel Wallace	Fr
OL	70	Mason Schweinle	Fr
OL	71	James Morrow	Sr
OL	72	Girevis Bobey	Fr
OL	73	Christian Crockett	Fr
OL	74	Joseph Mueller	So
TE	75	Blane Mendoza	Fr
OL	76	Matthew Schell	Fr
OL	77	Ramon Diaz	Jr
OL	78	Anthony Wright	GS
TE	79	Monty Campbell	Fr
WR	80	Josh Bolden	Jr
WR	81	Deon Cook	Jr
WR	82	Jalen Willis	Jr
TE	83	Jalen Becerra	Fr
WR	85	Shemar Davis	So
WR	86	Crimson Mathis	Fr
WR	87	Parker Grimes	So
WR	88	Ben Patterson	So
WR	89	Wilson Batiste	Fr
RB		Justin Castillo	Fr
WR		Jamaal Hall	Fr
WR		Justin Herman	Fr
WR		Zeke Long	Fr
QB		Jesse Medina	Fr
WR		Xavier Moten	Fr
WR		Jaquan Richardson	Fr
RB		Keith Rockwell	Fr
WR		Matthew Rosas	Fr
TE		Landon Ross	Fr
WR		Jordan Tally	Fr
WR		Jailen Toure	Fr
WR		Ilijah Williams	Fr

Defense

Pos.	#	Name	Class
DB	0	Jaques Taylor	Sr
LB	1	Jalon Rocquemore	Jr
DL	2	Victor Idusuyi	So
DL	5	Frank Mulipola	So
DB	7	Dequan Street	GS
DL	9	Malik Allen	Jr
DB	14	Tre Hubert	Jr
DB	17	Coby Calvin	GS
DB	19	Chanlor Johnson	Sr
DB	20	Jaylen Henderson	Sr
DB	21	Antione Tanner	Sr
LB	22	Caleb Pierson	So
DB	23	Kamren Amao	So
DB	24	Kendrick Jones	Fr
DB	26	Kris Agee	So
DB	27	Ashton Hamby	Jr
LB	28	Jamil Pittman	Sr
DB	28	B. J. Westmoreland	Jr
DB	29	Fahreed Cheeks	Sr
DB	30	Jacobe Chester	Fr
DB	31	Kelekolio Linton	Jr
DB	32	Champ Mathis	Jr
LB	35	Eric Franco	So
DB	36	Datron Brooks	So
DB	38	Jamar Roberson	Fr
DB	39	Layne Horak	So
LB	40	Courtney Massingill	Jr
DL	41	Elden Titania	Sr
LB	42	Hayden Kelly	GS
LB	43	Jonathan Brown	Fr
LB	45	Tristan Exline	Fr
DB	46	Jamarion Ravenell	Fr
LB	47	Sean Burks	Fr
DL	54	Caleb Freeland	Jr
DL	56	Sione Teuhema	So
DL	57	David Adegbenro	So
DL	60	Chase Warrem	Fr
DL	61	John Baldwin	Fr
DL	62	Liloa Kapiko	Jr
DL	63	Gabe Green	Fr
DL	90	De'Undre Potts	Jr
DL	91	Elyjah Gilliard	Fr
DL	92	Wilfred Manor	Jr
DL	93	Tyquan Cooper-Isaac	So
DL	94	Dominique Varela	Sr
DL	95	Chris Harris	Jr
DL	96	Emmanuel Lawton	Fr
DL	97	Mehki Harris	Fr
DL	98	Jacob Humphrey	Jr
DL	99	Amari Bedford	So
LB		Jaice Beck	Fr
DB		Mark Benard	Jr
LB		Chase Brown	Fr
LB		Chase Buckingham	Fr
DB		Dawson Bullard	Fr
LB		Kevin Cunningham	Fr
DB		Elijah Gerrard	Fr
LB		Tyler Manoy	Fr
DB		Roddy Mapps	Fr
DB		Dami Oluwoleajayi	Sr
DB		Jadyn Pruitt	Fr
DB		Radarion Wilson	Fr

Special teams

Pos.	#	Name	Class
LS	37	Grant Gensemer	Jr
K	48	Rafael Vargas	Jr
P	49	Sergio Landeros	GS
K	58	Nolan Park	Fr

Head coach

- Kris McCullough

Coordinators/assistant coaches

- Ryan Lusby
  Offensive coordinator
- Blake Crandall
  Co-offensive coordinator/Wide receivers/Passing game coordinator
- Dionte Dean
  Defensive coordinator
- Jake Maxwell
  Offensive line/Running game coordinator
- Alex Wierzbicki
  Defensive line/Running game coordinator
- Justin Victorian
  Safeties
- Brady Carson
  Special teams coordinator/Linebackers

Legend

- (C) Team captain
- (S) Suspended
- (I) Ineligible
- Injured
- Redshirt

Roster
Last update: September 17, 2023

== Game summaries ==
=== Texas College ===
Texas College Steers at UT Permian Basin Falcons – Game summary

Quarter	1	2	3	4	Total
Steers	0	0	0	0	0
Falcons	20	34	28	14	96

at Astound Broadband Stadium, Midland, Texas

- Date: September 2
- Game time: 6:00 p.m. CDT
- Game weather: Mild, 75 °F (24 °C)
- Game attendance: 3,579
- Referee: Jerry Springer
- Box score, Recap

Game information
First quarter
- TPB – Ben Patterson 18-yard pass from Kenny Hrncir (Rafael Vargas kick), 8:56. Falcons 7–0. Drive: 11 plays, 75 yards, 6:04.
- TPB – Calvin Little 37-yard pass from Kenny Hrncir (Rafael Vargas kick), 5:24. Falcons 14–0. Drive: 2 plays, 47 yards, 0:33.
- TPB – Laquan Wells 44-yard pass from Kenny Hrncir (kick failed), 0:00. Falcons 20–0. Drive: 6 plays, 78 yards, 1:45.

Second quarter

- TPB – Nemier Herod 2-yard run (run failed), 10:03. Falcons 26–0. Drive: 5 plays, 46 yards, 1:55.
- TPB – Laquan Wells 23-yard pass from Kenny Hrncir (Rafael Vargas kick), 4:47. Falcons 33–0. Drive: 2 plays, 36 yards, 1:42.
- TPB – Dequan Street 32-yard interception (Rafael Vargas kick), 1:34. Falcons 40–0.
- TPB – Jeremia Cooley 23-yard pass from Kenny Hrncir (Rafael Vargas kick), 0:01. Falcons 47–0. Drive: 5 plays, 45 yards, 0:31.

Third quarter

- TPB – Kory Harris 16-yard run (Rafael Vargas kick), 10:37. Falcons 54–0. Drive: 6 plays, 45 yards, 2:54.
- TPB – Jamar Ravenell 87-yard interception (Rafael Vargas kick), 7:35. Falcons 68–0.
- TPB – Nemier Herod 12-yard run (Rafael Vargas kick), 0:01. Falcons 75–0. Drive: 1 plays, 12 yards, 0:06.
- TPB – Brock Johnson 26-yard pass from Keegan Bryd (Rafael Vargas kick), 3:40. Falcons 82–0. Drive: 3 plays, 18 yards, 2:20.

Fourth quarter

- TPB – Gerard Palmer 9-yard run (Rafael Vargas kick), 9:28. Falcons 89–0. Drive: 7 plays, 48 yards, 8:05.
- TPB – Suddin Sapien-yard run (Rafael Vargas kick), 3:00. Falcons 96–0. Drive: 6 plays, 32 yards, 2:35.

Statistics	TC	TPB
First downs	18	31
Total yards	2	564
Rushing yards	-36	254
Passing yards	38	310
Turnovers	4	1
Time of possession	27:45	32:15

Team	Category	Player	Statistics
Texas College	Passing	Isiah Saddler	8/28, 38 yards, 3 INT
Texas College	Rushing	Tamauge Sloan	12 rushes, 18 yards
Texas College	Receiving	Terrell Hookfin	2 receptions, 19 yards
UT Permian Basin	Passing	Kenny Hrncir	19/25, 284 yards, 6 TD
UT Permian Basin	Rushing	Kory Harris	8 rushes, 75 yards, TD
UT Permian Basin	Receiving	Brock Johnson	2 receptions, 70 yards 2 TD

=== At Western Colorado ===
UT Permian Basin Falcons at Western Colorado Mountaineers – Game summary

Quarter	1	2	3	4	Total
Falcons	3	10	7	7	27
Mountaineers	14	14	0	7	35

at Mountaineer Bowl, Gunnison, Colorado

- Date: September 9
- Game time: 1:00 p.m. CDT/12:00 p.m. MDT
- Game weather: Sunny, 73 °F (23 °C)
- Game attendance: 103
- Referee: Aaron Olivares
- Box score, Recap

Game information
First quarter
- WCU – Braeden Hogan 2-yard run (Adam Tasei kick), 10:50. Mountaineers 7–0. Drive: 3 plays, 11 yards, 1:06.
- WCU – Andrew Montez 19-yard pass from Drew Nash (Adam Tasei kick), 6:59. Mountaineers 14–0. Drive: 5 plays, 62 yards, 2:13.
- TPB – Rafael Vargas 49-yard field goal, 0:26. Mountaineers 14–3. Drive: 4 plays, -2 yards, 0:57.

Second quarter

- WCU – Jeromiah Garmon 7-yard pass from Drew Nash (Adam Tasei kick), 13:51. Mountaineers 21–3. Drive: 5 plays, 64 yards, 1:33.
- TPB – Rafael Vargas 34-yard field goal, 10:03. Mountaineers 21–6. Drive: 11 plays, 63 yards, 3:42.
- WCU – Cole Riters 8-yard pass from Drew Nash (Adam Tasei kick), 1:45. Mountaineers 28–6. Drive: 7 plays, 33 yards, 1:39.
- TPB – Ben Patterson 24-yard pass from Kenny Hrncir (Rafael Vargas kick), 0:22. Mountaineers 28–13. Drive: 5 plays, 75 yards, 1:18.

Third quarter

- TPB – Jeremiah Cooley 24-yard pass from Kenny Hrncir (Rafael Vargas kick), 3:01. Mountaineers 28–20. Drive: 16 plays, 74 yards, 7:32.

Fourth quarter

- WCU – Cameron Colangelo 20-yard pass from Drew Nash (Adam Tasei kick), 13:45. Mountaineers 35–20. Drive: 11 plays, 75 yards, 4:16.
- TPB – Nemier Herod 1-yard run (Rafael Vargas kick), 1:48. Mountaineers 35–27. Drive: 14 plays, 60 yards, 4:54.

Statistics	UTP	WCU
First downs	24	15
Total yards	472	175
Rushing yards	178	112
Passing yards	294	63
Turnovers	2	2
Time of possession	35:33	24:27

Team	Category	Player	Statistics
UT Permian Basin	Passing	Kenny Hrncir	20/52, 294 yards, 2 TD, INT
UT Permian Basin	Rushing	Kenny Hrncir	12 rushes, 105 yards
UT Permian Basin	Receiving	Ben Patterson	3 receptions, 70 yards, TD
Western Colorado	Passing	Drew Nash	14/27, 63 yards, 2 TD, 2 INT
Western Colorado	Rushing	Deyvon Butler	15 rushes, 81 yards
Western Colorado	Receiving	Andrew Montez	4 receptions, 30 yards, TD

=== At Southwest Baptist ===
UT Permian Basin Falcons at Southwest Baptist Bearcats – Game summary

Quarter	1	2	3	4	Total
Falcons	16	28	21	21	86
Bearcats	0	0	7	0	7

at Plaster Stadium, Bolivar, Missouri

- Date: September 16
- Game time: 1:00 p.m. CDT
- Game weather: Cloudy, 78 °F (26 °C)
- Game attendance: 1,247
- Referee: David Green
- Box score, Recap

Game information
First quarter
- TPB – Kory Harris 15-yard run (Rafael Vargas kick), 8:52. Falcons 7–0. Drive: 11 plays, 75 yards, 6:08.
- TPB – Coby Calvin 39-yard interception return (Rafael Vargas kick), 8:42. Falcons 14–0.
- TPB – Mason Bollin tackled in end zone, 7:46. Falcons 16–0.

Second quarter

- TPB – Kenny Hrncir 1-yard run (Rafael Vargas kick), 11:53. Falcons 23–0. Drive: 3 plays, 69 yards, 1:17.
- TPB – Jeremiah Cooley 15-yard pass from Kenny Hrncir (Rafael Vargas kick), 7:14. Falcons 30–0. Drive: 6 plays, 57 yards, 3:21.
- TPB – Kory Harris 1-yard run (Rafael Vargas kick), 3:34. Falcons 37–0. Drive: 4 plays, 28 yards, 1:21.
- TPB – Dequan Street 57-yard fumble return (Rafael Vargas kick), 1:26. Falcons 44–0.

Third quarter

- TPB – Traylen Suel 31-yard pass from Kenny Hrncir (Rafael Vargas kick), 14:04. Falcons 51–0. Drive: 2 plays, 32 yards, 0:36.
- SBU – Kamerin Ferguson 6-yard run (Logan Turner kick), 13:20. Falcons 51–7. Drive: 2 plays, 73 yards, 0:35.
- TPB – Nemier Herod 2-yard run (Rafael Vargas kick), 10:30. Falcons 58–7. Drive: 6 plays, 70 yards, 2:44.
- TPB – Nemier Herod 7-yard pass from Kenny Hrncir (Rafael Vargas kick), 5:43. Falcons 65–7. Drive: 6 plays, 70 yards, 3:06.

Fourth quarter

- TPB – Matt Zubiate 1-yard run (Rafael Vargas kick), 13:14. Falcons 72–7. Drive: 11 plays, 45 yards, 4:59.
- TPB – Keegan Byrd 6-yard run (Rafael Vargas kick), 8:25. Falcons 79–7. Drive: 7 plays, 48 yards, 3:41.
- TPB – Clyde Bellow 64-yard pass from Keegan Byrd (Rafael Vargas kick), 5:07. Falcons 86–7. Drive: 3 plays, 66 yards, 0:50.

Statistics	TPB	SBU
First downs	27	8
Total yards	574	197
Rushing yards	219	21
Passing yards	355	176
Turnovers	1	5
Time of possession	31:58	28:02

Team	Category	Player	Statistics
UT Permian Basin	Passing	Kenny Hrncir	15/20, 291 yards, 3 TD, INT
UT Permian Basin	Rushing	Kory Harris	18 rushes, 80 yards, 2 TD
UT Permian Basin	Receiving	Deon Cook	2 receptions, 116 yards
Southwest Baptist	Passing	Collin Sutton	10/21, 139 yards, INT
Southwest Baptist	Rushing	Abel Carter	10 rushes, 25 yards
Southwest Baptist	Receiving	Kylan Herrera	1 reception, 67 yards

=== West Texas A&M ===
West Texas A&M Buffaloes at UT Permian Basin Falcons – Game summary

Quarter	1	2	3	4	OT	Total
Buffaloes	7	7	10	10	6	40
Falcons	3	0	7	24	7	41

at Astound Broadband Stadium, Midland, Texas

- Date: September 23
- Game time: 6:00 p.m. CDT
- Game weather: Hot, 90 °F (32 °C)
- Game attendance: 7,018
- Referee: Joe Greer
- Box score, Recap

Game information
First quarter
- WT – Kenneath Redd 2-yard blocked punt return (Preston Gregg kick), 13:41. Buffaloes 7–0.
- TPB – Rafael Vargas 38-yard field goal, 6:16. Buffaloes 7–3. Drive: 15 plays, 54 yards, 7:25.

Second quarter

- WT – Kris Sims 4-yard pass from Kanon Gibson (Preston Gregg kick), 5:41. Buffaloes 14–3. Drive: 13 plays, 60 yards, 6:36.

Third quarter

- WT – Preston Gregg 49-yard field goal, 8:01. Buffaloes 17–3. Drive: 5 plays, 28 yards, 1:49.
- TPB – Ben Patterson 19-yard pass from Kenny Hrncir (Rafael Vargas kick), 5:53. Buffaloes 17–10. Drive: 6 plays, 75 yards, 2:08.
- WT – Isai Smallwood 9-yard pass from Kanon Gibson (Preston Gregg kick), 0:16. Buffaloes 24–10. Drive: 11 plays, 77 yards, 5:30.

Fourth quarter

- TPB – Jeremiah Cooley 24-yard pass from Kenny Hrncir (Rafael Vargas kick), 13:36. Buffaloes 24–17. Drive: 5 plays, 69 yards, 1:32.
- WT – Preston Gregg 22-yard field goal, 6:37. Buffaloes 27–17. Drive: 14 plays, 80 yards, 6:53.
- TPB – Deon Cook 18-yard pass from Kenny Hrncir (Rafael Vargas kick), 4:28. Buffaloes 27–24. Drive: 6 plays, 75 yards, 2:09.
- WT – Kanon Gibson 74-yard run (Preston Gregg kick), 3:27. Buffaloes 34–24. Drive: 2 plays, 75 yards, 1:01.
- TPB – Rafael Vargas 35-yard field goal, 1:52. Buffaloes 34–27. Drive: 9 plays, 62 yards, 1:27.
- TPB – Kenny Hrncir 1-yard run (Rafael Vargas kick), 0:15. Tied 34–34. Drive: 11 plays, 52 yards, 1:36.

Overtime

- TPB – Kenny Hrncir 1-yard run (Rafael Vargas kick). Falcons 41–34. Drive: 5 plays, 25 yards.
- WT – Kenneath Redd 5-yard pass from Kanon Gibson (pass failed). Falcons 41–40. Drive: 5 plays, 25 yards.

Statistics	WT	TPB
First downs	20	25
Total yards	380	498
Rushing yards	183	179
Passing yards	197	319
Turnovers	0	2
Time of possession	33:40	26:20

Team	Category	Player	Statistics
West Texas A&M	Passing	Kanon Gibson	23/26, 197 yards, 3 TD
West Texas A&M	Rushing	Kanon Gibson	14 rushes, 123 yards, TD
West Texas A&M	Receiving	Isai Smallwood	5 receptions, 64 yards, TD
UT Permian Basin	Passing	Kenny Hrncir	19/40, 319 yards, 3 TD, INT
UT Permian Basin	Rushing	Kenny Hrncir	20 rushes, 105 yards, 2 TD
UT Permian Basin	Receiving	Jeremiah Cooley	5 receptions, 120 yards, TD

The Falcons trailed 10–24 entering the 4th quarter but outscored the Buffaloes 24–10 in the final quarter of regulation to tie the game 34–34 and force overtime. UTPB's final drive started with Rafael Vargas recovering his own onside kick. The Falcons converted twice on fourth down, converting a 4-and-1 and a 4-and-10, capping the drive with a 1-yard touchdown run by quarterback Kenny Hrncir. UTPB received the ball first in overtime. Facing a 4th-and-4 at the West Texas A&M 19-yard line, the Falcons went for it, gaining 18 yards, then scored a touchdown to go up 41–34. The Buffaloes would respond with a touchdown on the ensuing drive and opted to try a two-point conversion to win the game. Kanon Gibson attempted a pass on the conversion but the ball was batted out of the end zone, securing the 41–40 win for the Falcons.

=== No. 16 Texas A&M–Kingsville ===
No. 16 Texas A&M–Kingsville Javelinas at UT Permian Basin Falcons – Game summary

Quarter	1	2	3	4	Total
No. 16 Javelinas	7	3	0	7	17
Falcons	7	6	7	9	29

at Ratliff Stadium, Odessa, Texas

- Date: September 30
- Game time: 6:00 p.m. CDT
- Game weather: Sunny
- Game attendance: 3,233
- Referee: Kerry Moore
- Box score, Recap

Game information
First quarter
- TAK – Christian Anderson 11-yard run (Gilbert Garza kick), 12:51. Javelinas 7–0. Drive: 4 plays, 24 yards, 1:30.
- TPB – Nemier Herod 3-yard run (Rafael Vargas kick), 5:21. Tied 7–7. Drive: 14 plays, 75 yards, 7:30.

Second quarter

- TPB – Rafael Vargas 36-yard field goal, 13:19. Falcons 10–7. Drive: 11 plays, 58 yards, 4:48.
- TPB – Rafael Vargas 23-yard field goal, 3:51. Falcons 13–7. Drive: 10 plays, 37 yards, 5:42.
- TAK – Dillon Bredeson 20-yard field goal, 0:00. Falcons 13–10. Drive: 13 plays, 74 yards, 3:48.

Third quarter

- TPB – Kory Harris 8-yard run (Rafael Vargas kick), 6:47. Falcons 20–10. Drive: 7 plays, 59 yards, 3:34.

Fourth quarter

- TPB – Kenny Hrncir 18-yard run (Rafael Vargas kick), 11:17. Falcons 27–10. Drive: 4 plays, 27 yards, 2:03.
- TAK – Roger Hagan 7-yard run (Gilbert Garza kick), 7:53. Falcons 27–17. Drive: 6 plays, 75 yards, 3:24.
- TPB – Christian Anderson tackled in end zone, 2:01. Falcons 29–17.

Statistics	TAK	TPB
First downs	14	16
Total yards	241	342
Rushing yards	97	222
Passing yards	144	120
Turnovers	2	1
Time of possession	23:25	36:35

Team	Category	Player	Statistics
Texas A&M–Kingsville	Passing	Kannon Williams	10/16, 130 yards, INT
Texas A&M–Kingsville	Rushing	Christian Anderson	16 rushes, 59 yards, TD
Texas A&M–Kingsville	Receiving	Jason Gaines	2 receptions, 71 yards
UT Permian Basin	Passing	Kenny Hrncir	10/24, 120 yards, INT
UT Permian Basin	Rushing	Kory Harris	19 rushes, 104 yards, TD
UT Permian Basin	Receiving	Jeremiah Cooley	3 receptions, 61 yards

=== At Midwestern State ===
UT Permian Basin Falcons at Midwestern State Mustangs – Game summary

Quarter	1	2	3	4	Total
Falcons	14	0	0	7	21
Mustangs	3	0	7	3	13

at Memorial Stadium, Wichita Falls, Texas

- Date: October 7
- Game time: 7:00 p.m. CDT
- Game weather: Clear, 66 °F (19 °C)
- Game attendance: 6,122
- Referee: Bernard Johnson
- Box score, Recap

Game information
First quarter
- TPB – Kory Harris 2-yard run (Rafael Vargas kick), 7:08. Falcons 7–0. Drive: 13 plays, 80 yards, 6:37.
- MSU – Ritse Vaes 25-yard field goal, 2:01. Falcons 7–3. Drive: 10 plays, 81 yards, 5:00.
- TPB – Nemier Herod 49-yard run (Rafael Vargas kick), 0:59. Falcons 14–3. Drive: 3 plays, 69 yards, 0:51.

Second quarter

- No scoring plays

Third quarter

- MSU – James Cooper Jr. 18-yard run (Ritse Vaes kick), 6:58. Falcons 14–10. Drive: 9 plays, 64 yards, 4:06.

Fourth quarter

- MSU – Ritse Vaes 40-yard field goal, 14:11. Falcons 14–13. Drive: 9 plays, 46 yards, 4:48.
- TPB – Nemier Herod 4-yard run (Rafael Vargas kick), 9:09. Falcons 21–13. Drive: 11 plays, 72 yards, 4:59.

Statistics	TPB	MSU
First downs	19	19
Total yards	381	334
Rushing yards	149	249
Passing yards	232	85
Turnovers	3	0
Time of possession	26:15	33:45

Team	Category	Player	Statistics
UT Permian Basin	Passing	Kenny Hrncir	14/27, 232 yards
UT Permian Basin	Rushing	Nemier Herod	14 rushes, 81 yards, 2 TD
UT Permian Basin	Receiving	Ben Patterson	4 receptions, 100 yards
Midwestern State	Passing	James Cooper Jr.	7/11, 47 yards
Midwestern State	Rushing	Devin Cross	19 rushes, 131 yards
Midwestern State	Receiving	Jalen Austin	2 receptions, 17 yards

=== Eastern New Mexico ===
Eastern New Mexico Greyhounds at UT Permian Basin Falcons – Game summary

Quarter	1	2	3	4	Total
Greyhounds	7	7	0	15	29
Falcons	6	15	10	21	52

at Astound Broadband Stadium, Midland, Texas

- Date: October 14
- Game time: 6:00 p.m. CDT
- Game weather: Sunny
- Game attendance: 1,792
- Referee: James Minor
- Box score

Game information
First quarter
- ENM – D'Andre Fillmore 31-yard pass from Mario Sanchez (Kaden Bell kick), 7:05. Greyhounds 7–0. Drive: 17 plays, 80 yards, 7:50.
- TPB – Traylen Suel 12-yard pass from Kenny Hrncir (kick failed), 5:00. Greyhounds 7–6. Drive: 6 plays, 78 yards, 1:55.

Second quarter

- TPB – Nemier Herod 37-yard run (Kenny Hrncir pass to Ben Henderson), 12:15. Falcons 14–7. Drive: 10 plays, 99 yards, 4:48.
- ENM – Ja'Calvin Newsom 55-yard run (Kaden Bell kick), 11:49. Tied 14–14. Drive: 1 play, 55 yards, 0:20.
- TPB – Kory Harris 55-yard run (Rafael Vargas kick), 10:20. Falcons 21–14. Drive: 4 plays, 87 yards, 1:24.

Third quarter

- TPB – Nemier Herod 71-yard run (Rafael Vargas kick), 12:44. Falcons 28–14. Drive: 5 plays, 85 yards, 2:11.
- TPB – Rafael Vargas 25-yard field goal, 4:46. Falcons 31–14. Drive: 11 plays, 60 yards, 6:01.

Fourth quarter

- TPB – Nemier Herod 4-yard run (Rafael Vargas kick), 14:57. Falcons 38–14. Drive: 9 plays, 59 yards, 3:25.
- TPB – Matt Zubiate 68-yard pass from Kenny Hrncir (Rafael Vargas kick), 13:32. Falcons 45–14. Drive: 1 play, 68 yards, 0:15.
- ENM – Andre Jones 38-yard pass from Mario Sanchez (Kaden Bell kick), 11:31. Falcons 45–21. Drive: 4 plays, 52 yards, 1:57.
- TPB – Keegan Byrd 3-yard run (Rafael Vargas kick), 8:31. Falcons 52–21. Drive: 6 plays, 29 yards, 2:55.
- ENM – Andre Jones 40-yard pass from Mario Sanchez (Mario Sanchez run), 5:54. Falcons 52–29. Drive: 5 plays, 77 yards, 2:30.

Statistics	ENM	TPB
First downs	14	29
Total yards	345	677
Rushing yards	181	458
Passing yards	164	219
Turnovers	1	0
Time of possession	26:45	33:15

Team	Category	Player	Statistics
Eastern New Mexico	Passing	Mario Sanchez	7/16, 164 yards, 3 TD
Eastern New Mexico	Rushing	Ja'Calvin Newsom	3 rushes, 62 yards
Eastern New Mexico	Receiving	Andre Jones	3 receptions, 87 yards, 2 TD
UT Permian Basin	Passing	Kenny Hrncir	13/21, 194 yards, 2 TD
UT Permian Basin	Rushing	Kory Harris	13 rushes, 159 yards, TD
UT Permian Basin	Receiving	Matt Zubiate	2 receptions, 86 yards, TD

With the win, the Falcons improved to 6–1 overall, breaking the record for most wins in a single season, and improved to 4–0 in LSC play, tying the record for most conference wins in a single season.

=== At No. 19 Angelo State ===
UT Permian Basin Falcons at Angelo State Rams – Game summary

Quarter	1	2	3	4	Total
Falcons	0	14	14	0	28
No. 19 Rams	3	17	3	0	23

at LeGrand Sports Complex, San Angelo, Texas

- Date: October 21
- Game time: 6:00 p.m. CDT
- Game weather: Sunny
- Game attendance: 4,828
- Referee: Wayne Elliots
- Box score, Recap

Game information
First quarter
- ASU – Bradley Larson 48-yard field goal, 7:32. Rams 3–0. Drive: 7 plays, 30 yards, 3:27.

Second quarter

- ASU – Andrew Pitts 59-yard blocked field goal return (Bradley Larson kick), 12:31. Rams 10–0.
- TPB – Jeremiah Cooley 16-yard pass from Kenny Hrncir (Rafael Vargas kick), 8:52. Rams 10–7. Drive: 8 plays, 67 yards, 3:34.
- ASU – Gerald Gardner 8-yard run (Bradley Larson kick), 4:15. Rams 17–7. Drive: 10 plays, 75 yards, 4:37.
- TPB – Deon Cook 32-yard pass from Kenny Hrncir (Rafael Vargas kick), 0:41. Rams 17–14. Drive: 8 plays, 65 yards, 3:34.
- ASU – Bradley Larson 36-yard field goal, 0:00. Rams 20–14. Drive: 6 plays, 58 yards, 0:36.

Third quarter

- TPB – Laquan Wells 7-yard pass from Kenny Hrncir (Rafael Vargas kick), 10:20. Falcons 21–20. Drive: 8 plays, 49 yards, 3:09.
- ASU – Bradley Larson 27-yard field goal, 4:56. Rams 23–21. Drive: 9 plays, 69 yards, 5:18.
- TPB – Laquan Wells 14-yard pass from Kenny Hrncir (Rafael Vargas kick), 2:42. Falcons 28–23. Drive: 4 plays, 75 yards, 2:14.

Fourth quarter

- No scoring plays

Statistics	TPB	ASU
First downs	21	16
Total yards	366	280
Rushing yards	163	158
Passing yards	203	122
Turnovers	0	2
Time of possession	35:39	24:21

Team	Category	Player	Statistics
UT Permian Basin	Passing	Kenny Hrncir	21/27, 203 yards, 4 TD
UT Permian Basin	Rushing	Kory Harris	9 rushes, 79 yards
UT Permian Basin	Receiving	Deon Cook	5 receptions, 65 yards, TD
Angelo State	Passing	Gerald Gardner	17/29, 122 yards, 2 INT
Angelo State	Rushing	Brayden Wilcox	10 rushes, 80 yards
Angelo State	Receiving	Kel Williams	4 receptions, 46 yards

=== Western Oregon ===
Western Oregon Wolves at No. 22 UT Permian Basin Falcons – Game summary

Quarter	1	2	3	4	Total
Wolves	3	0	0	13	16
No. 22 Falcons	0	21	7	0	28

at Astound Broadband Stadium, Midland, Texas

- Date: October 28
- Game time: 6:00 p.m.
- Game weather: Sunny
- Game attendance: 5,127
- Referee: Jason Hickey
- Box score, Recap

Game information
First quarter
- WOU – Charlie Shulkin 39-yard field goal, 5:55. Wolves 3–0. Drive: 15 plays, 58 yards, 7:04.

Second quarter

- TPB – Kenny Hrncir 5-yard run (Rafael Vargas kick), 10:43. Falcons 7–3. Drive: 9 plays, 82 yards, 4:24.
- TPB – Ben Patterson 70-yard pass from Kenny Hrncir (Rafael Vargas kick), 2:45. Falcons 14–3. Drive: 5 plays, 90 yards, 1:47.
- TPB – Ben Patterson 11-yard pass from Kenny Hrncir (Rafael Vargas kick), 0:56. Falcons 21–3. Drive: 4 plays, 61 yards, 0:33.

Third quarter

- TPB – Laquan Wells 7-yard pass from Kenny Hrncir (Rafael Vargas kick), 10:07. Falcons 28–3. Drive: 11 plays, 53 yards, 4:53.

Fourth quarter

- WOU – Brenden Hodge 74-yard pass from Gannon Winkler (Charlie Shulkin kick), 3:20. Falcons 28–10. Drive: 2 plays, 69 yards, 0:42.
- WOU – Austin Bacher 23-yard run (pass failed), 1:44. Falcons 28–16. Drive: 5 plays, 48 yards, 1:36.

Statistics	WOU	TPB
First downs	17	24
Total yards	328	487
Rushing yards	113	108
Passing yards	215	379
Turnovers	1	3
Time of possession	29:46	30:14

Team	Category	Player	Statistics
Western Oregon	Passing	Gannon Winkler	15/28, 204 yards, TD, INT
Western Oregon	Rushing	Austin Bacher	17 rushes, 99 yards, TD
Western Oregon	Receiving	Brenden Hodge	7 receptions, 139 yards, TD
UT Permian Basin	Passing	Kenny Hrncir	23/37, 379 yards, 3 TD, INT
UT Permian Basin	Rushing	Kenny Hrncir	11 rushes, 46 yards, TD
UT Permian Basin	Receiving	Ben Patterson	6 receptions, 142 yards, 2 TD

=== At Western New Mexico ===
No. 18 UT Permian Basin Falcons at Western New Mexico Mustangs – Game summary

Quarter	1	2	3	4	Total
No. 18 Falcons	7	28	7	14	56
Mustangs	0	0	0	3	3

at Ben Altamirano Field, Silver City, New Mexico

- Date: November 4
- Game time: 1:00 p.m. CDT/12:00 p.m. MDT
- Game weather: Sunny, 62 °F (17 °C)
- Game attendance: 678
- Referee: Rex Rose
- Box score, Recap

Game information
First quarter
- TPB – Deon Cook 29-yard pass from Kenny Hrncir (Rafael Vargas kick), 3:15. Falcons 7–0. Drive: 8 plays, 86 yards, 3:30.

Second quarter

- TPB – Ben Patterson 24-yard pass from Kenny Hrncir (Rafael Vargas kick), 13:31. Falcons 14–0. Drive: 8 plays, 85 yards, 2:43.
- TPB – Deon Cook 16-yard pass from Kenny Hrncir (Rafael Vargas kick), 8:53. Falcons 21–0. Drive: 9 plays, 69 yards, 3:34.
- TPB – Gunnar Abseck 5-yard pass from Kenny Hrncir (Rafael Vargas kick), 6:32. Falcons 28–0. Drive: 4 plays, 18 yards, 0:37.
- TPB – Traylen Suel 35-yard pass from Kenny Hrncir (Rafael Vargas kick), 0:21. Falcons 35–0. Drive: 7 plays, 68 yards, 1:58.

Third quarter

- TPB – Kory Harris 12-yard run (Rafael Vargas kick), 4:38. Falcons 42–0. Drive: 15 plays, 78 yards, 7:38.

Fourth quarter

- TPB – Nemier Herod 73-yard run (Rafael Vargas kick), 12:07. Falcons 49–0. Drive: 2 plays, 69 yards, 0:45.
- TPB – Wilson Batiste 1-yard run (Rafael Vargas kick), 6:37. Falcons 56–0. Drive: 6 plays, 73 yards, 2:36.
- WNM – Tanner Bobic 42-yard field goal, 3:01. Falcons 56–3. Drive: 4 plays, -5 yards, 1:29.

Statistics	TPB	WNM
First downs	31	8
Total yards	631	93
Rushing yards	407	16
Passing yards	224	77
Turnovers	1	2
Time of possession	31:11	28:49

Team	Category	Player	Statistics
UT Permian Basin	Passing	Kenny Hrncir	14/21, 219 yards, 5 TD
UT Permian Basin	Rushing	Nemier Herod	10 rushes, 121 yards, TD
UT Permian Basin	Receiving	Gunnar Abseck	4 receptions, 53 yards, TD
Western New Mexico	Passing	Hunter Davis	12/21, 77 yards, 2 INT
Western New Mexico	Rushing	Marcus Higgs	7 rushes, 22 yards
Western New Mexico	Receiving	Deuce Zimmerman	2 receptions, 35 yards

=== No. 23 Central Washington ===
No. 23 Central Washington Wildcats at No. 17 UT Permian Basin Falcons – Game summary

Quarter	1	2	3	4	Total
No. 23 Wildcats	0	14	0	0	14
No. 17 Falcons	14	0	21	7	42

at Astound Broadband Stadium, Midland, Texas

- Date: November 11
- Game time: 2:00 p.m. CST
- Game weather: Cloudy, 50 °F (10 °C)
- Game attendance: 6,477
- Referee: Kerry Kelarek
- Box score, Recap

Game information
First quarter
- TPB – Kenny Hrncir 2-yard run (Rafael Vargas kick), 9:23. Falcons 7–0. Drive: 9 plays, 66 yards, 4:05.
- TPB – Kenny Hrncir 1-yard run (Rafael Vargas kick), 0:19. Falcons 14–0. Drive: 4 plays, 69 yards, 1:36.

Second quarter

- CWU – Tyler Flanagan 2-yard run (Josh Jones kick), 7:02. Falcons 14–7. Drive: 6 plays, 70 yards, 2:52.
- CWU – Darius Morrison 6-yard pass from Kennedy McGill (Josh Jones kick), 0:16. Tied 14–14. Drive: 8 plays, 65 yards, 4:07.

Third quarter

- TPB – Jeremiah Cooley 66-yard pass from Kenny Hrncir (Rafael Vargas kick), 14:24. Falcons 21–14. Drive: 2 plays, 75 yards, 0:36.
- TPB – Jeremiah Cooley 28-yard pass from Kenny Hrncir (Rafael Vargas kick), 10:23. Falcons 28–14. Drive: 5 plays, 63 yards, 2:04.
- TPB – Kory Harris 34-yard run (Rafael Vargas kick), 3:05. Falcons 35–14. Drive: 9 plays, 87 yards, 4:53.

Fourth quarter

- TPB – Kenny Hrncir 9-yard run (Rafael Vargas kick), 11:17. Falcons 42–14. Drive: 12 plays, 67 yards, 5:50.

Statistics	CWU	TPB
First downs	16	23
Total yards	321	502
Rushing yards	140	329
Passing yards	181	173
Turnovers	4	2
Time of possession	27:32	32:28

Team	Category	Player	Statistics
Central Washington	Passing	Kennedy McGill	9/16, 148 yards, TD
Central Washington	Rushing	Kennedy McGill	13 rushes, 64 yards
Central Washington	Receiving	Zach Matlock	3 receptions, 62 yards
UT Permian Basin	Passing	Kenny Hrncir	10/20, 173 yards, 2 TD, 2 INT
UT Permian Basin	Rushing	Kory Harris	16 rushes, 116 yards, TD
UT Permian Basin	Receiving	Jeremiah Cooley	2 receptions, 94 yards, 2 TD

With the win, the Falcons finished the regular season going a perfect 8–0 in conference play to win the LSC title for the first time in program history.

=== No. 21 Bemidji State (NCAA Division II First Round) ===
NCAA Division II First Round
No. 21 Bemidji State Beavers at No. 12 UT Permian Basin Falcons – Game summary

Quarter	1	2	3	4	Total
No. 21 Beavers	0	7	3	0	10
No. 12 Falcons	0	0	0	3	3

at Astound Broadband Stadium, Midland, Texas

- Date: November 18
- Game time: 1:00 p.m. CST
- Game weather: Cloudy, 57 °F (14 °C)
- Game attendance: 2,697
- Referee: Cecil Harrison
- Box score, Recap

Game information
First quarter
- No scoring plays

Second quarter

- BSU – Mike Wandmaker 15-yard pass from Brandon Alt (Marko Jovisic kick), 2:03. Beavers 7–0. Drive: 12 plays, 57 yards, 5:13.

Third quarter

- BSU – Marko Jovisic 20-yard field goal, 4:12. Beavers 10–0. Drive: 11 plays, 49 yards, 5:41.

Fourth quarter

- UTPB – Rafael Vargas 44-yard field goal, 0:41. Beavers 10–3. Drive: 12 plays, 46 yards, 1:41.

Statistics	BSU	TPB
First downs	15	17
Total yards	220	264
Rushing yards	69	111
Passing yards	151	153
Turnovers	1	2
Time of possession	28:18	31:42

Team	Category	Player	Statistics
Bemidji State	Passing	Brandon Alt	19/24, 151 yards, TD, INT
Bemidji State	Rushing	Ali Mohamed	19 rushes, 38 yards
Bemidji State	Receiving	Dhel Duncan-Busby	3 receptions, 43 yards
UT Permian Basin	Passing	Kenny Hrncir	15/37, 153 yards, 2 INT
UT Permian Basin	Rushing	Kenny Hrncir	24 rushes, 72 yards
UT Permian Basin	Receiving	Jeremiah Cooley	3 receptions, 38 yards

== Statistics ==
=== Scoring ===
Scores against non-conference opponents

	1	2	3	4	Total
Opponents	14	21	10	7	52
UT Permian Basin	39	72	56	45	212

Scores against the Lone Star Conference

	1	2	3	4	OT	Total
Opponents	30	48	20	51	6	155
UT Permian Basin	51	84	66	89	7	297

Scores against all opponents

	1	2	3	4	OT	Total
Opponents	44	69	30	58	6	207
UT Permian Basin	90	156	129	127	7	509

== Weekly awards ==
- LSC Offensive Player of the Week

Kenny Hrncir (week 4 vs. West Texas A&M)
Nemier Herod (week 7 vs. Eastern New Mexico)
Kenny Hrncir (week 8 vs. Angelo State)
Kenny Hrncir (week 9 vs. Western Oregon)
Kenny Hrncir (week 11 vs. Central Washington)

- LSC Defensive Player of the Week

Hayden Kelly (week 6 vs. Midwestern State)
Hayden Kelly (week 11 vs. Central Washington)

- LSC Special Teams Player of the Week

Sergio Landeros (week 5 vs. Texas A&M–Kingsville)
