= Josh Lynn =

American football player and coach

Current position
- Title: Head coach
- Team: West Texas A&M
- Conference: LSC
- Record: 16–17

Biographical details
- Born: c. 1978 (age 47–48)

Playing career
- 1997–2000: Eastern New Mexico
- Position: Tight end

Coaching career (HC unless noted)
- 2002–2003: Eastern New Mexico (WR/TE)
- 2004: Delta State (OLB/S)
- 2005–2009: New Mexico Military (DC/DL/DB)
- 2010: New Mexico Military (OC/OL)
- 2011: New Mexico Military
- 2012–2016: Eastern New Mexico
- 2017–2022: Nebraska–Kearney
- 2023–present: West Texas A&M

Head coaching record
- Overall: 81–67 (college); 9–2 (junior college)
- Bowls: 2–2
- Tournaments: 1–1 (NCAA D-II playoffs)

Accomplishments and honors

Championships
- 1 LSC (2013); 1 MIAA (2021)

Awards
- WSFL Coach of the Year (2011); LSC Coach of the Year (2013); AFCA D2 Region 4 Coach of the Year (2013); Don Hansen Region 4 Coach of the Year (2013); Liberty Mutual National Coach of the Year Finalist (2013); MIAA Coach of the Year (2021)

Josh Lynn (born c. 1978) is an American college football coach and former player. He is the head football coach for West Texas A&M University, a position he has held since 2023. Lynn served as the head football coach at his alma mater, Eastern New Mexico University, from 2012 to 2016, and the University of Nebraska–Kearney from 2017 to 2022.

== Head coaching record ==
=== College ===
Year	Team	Overall	Conference	Standing	Bowl/playoffs	AFCA^{#}
Eastern New Mexico Greyhounds (Lone Star Conference) (2012–2016)
2012	Eastern New Mexico	3–7	2–6	7th		
2013	Eastern New Mexico	7–3	5–1	T–1st		
2014	Eastern New Mexico	7–4	3–4	6th		
2015	Eastern New Mexico	6–6	3–3	T–3rd	L C.H.A.M.P.S. Heart of Texas	
2016	Eastern New Mexico	7–5	6–3	T–3rd	L C.H.A.M.P.S. Heart of Texas	
Eastern New Mexico:		30–25	19–17			
Nebraska–Kearney Lopers (Mid-America Intercollegiate Athletics Association) (2017–2022)
2017	Nebraska–Kearney	3–8	3–8	10th		
2018	Nebraska–Kearney	5–6	5–6	T–7th		
2019	Nebraska–Kearney	7–5	6–5	T–5th	W Mineral Water	
2020–21	Nebraska–Kearney	2–0	0–0	N/A		
2021	Nebraska–Kearney	10–3	9–2	T–1st	L NCAA Division II Second Round	15
2022	Nebraska–Kearney	8–3	8–3	T–3rd		
Nebraska–Kearney:		35–25	31–24			
West Texas A&M Buffaloes (Lone Star Conference) (2023–present)
2023	West Texas A&M	3–7	2–6	T–6th		
2024	West Texas A&M	5–6	5–4	6th		
2025	West Texas A&M	8–4	7–2	T–2nd	W Heritage	
West Texas A&M:		16–17	14–12			
Total:		81–67				
National championship Conference title Conference division title or championship game berth
