= 2023 West Texas A&M Buffaloes football team =

American college football season

2023 West Texas A&M Buffaloes football
- Conference: Lone Star Conference
- Record: 3–7 (2–6 LSC)
- Head coach: Josh Lynn (1st season)
- Offensive coordinator: Chase Kyser (1st season)
- Offensive scheme: Pro spread
- Defensive coordinator: Levi Gallas (1st season)
- Base defense: 3–4
- Home stadium: Bain–Schaeffer Buffalo Stadium

2023 Lone Star Conference football standings
| | Conf. | | | Overall |
| Team | W | | L | W | | L |
|---|---|---|---|---|---|---|
| No. 18 UT Permian Basin $^ | 8 | – | 0 | 10 | – | 2 |
| No. 17 Central Washington ^ | 7 | – | 1 | 9 | – | 4 |
| Angelo State | 6 | – | 2 | 7 | – | 3 |
| Texas A&M–Kingsville | 5 | – | 3 | 7 | – | 3 |
| Midwestern State | 3 | – | 5 | 4 | – | 6 |
| Eastern New Mexico | 2 | – | 6 | 5 | – | 6 |
| West Texas A&M | 2 | – | 6 | 3 | – | 7 |
| Western Oregon | 2 | – | 6 | 3 | – | 8 |
| Western New Mexico | 1 | – | 7 | 2 | – | 8 |
$ – Conference champion; ^ – NCAA Division II playoff participant; Rankings from AFCA Poll

The 2023 West Texas A&M Buffaloes football team represented West Texas A&M University (WT) during the 2023 NCAA Division II football season as a member of the Lone Star Conference. Led by first-year head coach Josh Lynn, the Buffaloes played their home games at Bain–Schaeffer Buffalo Stadium in Canyon, Texas.

== Coaching changes ==
On November 21, 2022, Hunter Hughes was fired as the Buffaloes' head coach after six seasons. On December 14, 2022, Nebraska–Kearney head coach Josh Lynn was hired as the Buffaloes' new head coach.

== LSC preseason poll ==
The LSC preseason poll was released on July 27, 2023. The Buffaloes were predicted to finish fifth in the conference.

== Schedule ==
| Date | Time | Opponent | Site | Result | Attendance |
|---|---|---|---|---|---|
| September 2 | 2:00 p.m. | at Western Colorado* | Mountaineer Bowl; Gunnison, CO | L 6–28 | N/A |
| September 9 | 7:00 p.m. | Adams State* | Bain–Schaeffer Buffalo Stadium; Canyon, TX | W 28–7 | 6,981 |
| September 16 | 7:00 p.m. | Midwestern State | Bain–Schaeffer Buffalo Stadium; Canyon, TX | W 23–0 | 6,726 |
| September 23 | 6:00 p.m. | at UT Permian Basin | Astound Broadband Stadium; Midland, TX | L 40–41 ^{OT} | 7,018 |
| September 30 | 7:00 p.m. | Western Oregon | Bain–Schaeffer Buffalo Stadium; Canyon, TX | L 36–37 | 6,553 |
| October 7 | 7:00 p.m. | at Texas A&M–Kingsville | Javelina Stadium; Kingsville, TX | L 21–28 | 5,374 |
| October 14 | 7:00 p.m. | Western New Mexico^{†} | Bain–Schaeffer Buffalo Stadium; Canyon, TX | W 49–27 | 8,462 |
| October 21 | 8:00 p.m. | at Central Washington | Tomlinson Stadium; Ellensburg, WA | L 14–30 | 6,998 |
| October 28 | 7:00 p.m. | Angelo State | Bain–Schaeffer Buffalo Stadium; Canyon, TX | L 10–27 | 4,972 |
| November 4 | 1:00 p.m. | at Eastern New Mexico | Greyhound Stadium; Portales, NM (Wagon Wheel) | L 27–35 | 2,402 |
*Non-conference game; ^{†}Homecoming; All times are in Central time

== Game summaries ==
=== At Western Colorado ===
West Texas A&M Buffaloes at Western Colorado Mountaineers – Game summary

| Quarter | 1 | 2 | 3 | 4 | Total |
|---|---|---|---|---|---|
| Buffaloes | 0 | 6 | 0 | 0 | 6 |
| Mountaineers | 14 | 0 | 0 | 14 | 28 |

at Mountaineer Bowl, Gunnison, Colorado

- Date: September 2
- Game time: 2:00 p.m. CDT/1:00 p.m. MDT
- Game weather: Sunny
- Referee: Cecil Harrison
- Box score, Recap

Game information
First quarter
- WCU – Deyvon Butler 2-yard run (Adam Tasei kick), 8:40. Mountaineers 7–0. Drive: 12 plays, 73 yards, 4:26.
- WCU – Deyvon Butler 2-yard run (Adam Tasei kick), 1:47. Mountaineers 14–0. Drive: 2 plays, 16 yards, 1:01.

Second quarter

- WT – Preston Gregg 33-yard field goal, 8:08. Mountaineers 14–3. Drive: 11 plays, 47 yards, 4:21.
- WT – Preston Gregg 22-yard field goal, 0:53. Mountaineers 14–6. Drive: 10 plays, 24 yards, 4:44.

Third quarter

- No scoring plays

Fourth quarter

- WCU – Braeden Hogan 3-yard run (Adam Tasei kick), 3:52. Mountaineers 21–6. Drive: 8 plays, 88 yards, 3:36.
- WCU – Deyvon Butler 23-yard run (Adam Tasei kick), 2:45. Mountaineers 28–6. Drive: 1 play, 23 yards, 0:07.

| Statistics | WT | WCU |
|---|---|---|
| First downs | 16 | 17 |
| Total yards | 239 | 324 |
| Rushing yards | 108 | 166 |
| Passing yards | 131 | 158 |
| Turnovers | 2 | 1 |
| Time of possession | 30:58 | 29:02 |

| Team | Category | Player | Statistics |
|---|---|---|---|
| West Texas A&M | Passing | Kyle Brown | 11/26, 95 yards, INT |
| West Texas A&M | Rushing | Tray'vion McCoy-Gay | 16 rushes, 72 yards |
| West Texas A&M | Receiving | Kris Sims | 3 receptions, 31 yards |
| Western Colorado | Passing | Drew Nash | 13/27, 158 yards |
| Western Colorado | Rushing | Deyvon Butler | 11 rushes, 61 yards, 3 TD |
| Western Colorado | Receiving | Victory David | 1 reception, 64 yards |

=== Adams State ===
Adams State Grizzlies at West Texas A&M Buffaloes – Game summary

| Quarter | 1 | 2 | 3 | 4 | Total |
|---|---|---|---|---|---|
| Grizzlies | 0 | 0 | 7 | 0 | 7 |
| Buffaloes | 7 | 7 | 7 | 7 | 28 |

at Bain–Schaeffer Buffalo Stadium, Canyon, Texas

- Date: September 9
- Game time: 7:00 p.m.
- Game weather: Sunny
- Game attendance: 6,981
- Referee: Esrael Silva
- Box score, Recap

Game information
First quarter
- WT – Tyler Sweet 3-yard pass from Kanon Gibson (Preston Gregg kick), 6:43. Buffaloes 7–0. Drive: 10 plays, 68 yards, 4:49.

Second quarter

- WT – Kanon Gibson 1-yard run (Preston Gregg kick), 8:38. Buffaloes 14–0. Drive: 10 plays, 57 yards, 5:31.

Third quarter

- ASU – Kentrell Petite 16-yard pass from Connor Underhill (Rudy Bukassa kick), 13:39. Buffaloes 14–7. Drive: 3 plays, 27 yards, 1:12.
- WT – Tray'vion McCoy-Gay 4-yard run (Preston Gregg kick), 7:08. Buffaloes 21–7. Drive: 13 plays, 69 yards, 6:22.

Fourth quarter

- WT – Shakell Brown 5-yard pass from Kanon Gibson (Preston Gregg kick), 10:45. Buffaloes 28–7. Drive: 12 plays, 66 yards, 6:15.

| Statistics | ASU | WT |
|---|---|---|
| First downs | 13 | 25 |
| Total yards | 215 | 345 |
| Rushing yards | 105 | 199 |
| Passing yards | 110 | 146 |
| Turnovers | 1 | 2 |
| Time of possession | 25:12 | 34:48 |

| Team | Category | Player | Statistics |
|---|---|---|---|
| Adams State | Passing | Connor Underhill | 9/28, 110 yards, TD, INT |
| Adams State | Rushing | Daylen Boddie | 2 rushes, 53 yards |
| Adams State | Receiving | Aaron Johnson | 3 receptions, 46 yards |
| West Texas A&M | Passing | Kanon Gibson | 22/29, 146 yards, 2 TD, INT |
| West Texas A&M | Rushing | Tray'vian McCoy-Gay | 24 rushes, 104 yards, TD |
| West Texas A&M | Receiving | Tyler Sweet | 6 receptions, 56 yards, TD |

=== Midwestern State ===
Midwestern State Mustangs at West Texas A&M Buffaloes – Game summary

| Quarter | 1 | 2 | 3 | 4 | Total |
|---|---|---|---|---|---|
| Mustangs | 0 | 0 | 0 | 0 | 0 |
| Buffaloes | 0 | 10 | 10 | 3 | 23 |

at Bain–Schaeffer Buffalo Stadium, Canyon, Texas

- Date: September 16
- Game time: 7:00 p.m.
- Game weather: Sunny
- Game attendance: 6,726
- Referee: Kerry Moore
- Box score, Recap

Game information
First quarter
- No scoring plays

Second quarter

- WT – Isaiah Smallwood 1-yard run (Preston Gregg kick), 12:53. Buffaloes 7–0. Drive: 7 plays, 20 yards, 2:47.
- WT – Preston Gregg 40-yard field goal, 9:29. Buffaloes 10–0. Drive: 5 plays, 16 yards, 0:56.

Third quarter

- WT – Preston Gregg 33-yard field goal, 9:26. Buffaloes 13–0. Drive: 4 plays, 6 yards, 2:14.
- WT – Ryan Cosper 18-yard pass from Kyle Brown (Preston Gregg kick), 3:14. Buffaloes 20–0. Drive: 5 plays, 80 yards, 2:45.

Fourth quarter

- WT – Preston Gregg 25-yard field goal, 4:15. Buffaloes 23–0. Drive: 11 plays, 58 yards, 7:23.

| Statistics | MSU | WT |
|---|---|---|
| First downs | 10 | 13 |
| Total yards | 103 | 280 |
| Rushing yards | 38 | 205 |
| Passing yards | 65 | 75 |
| Turnovers | 2 | 1 |
| Time of possession | 28:05 | 31:55 |

| Team | Category | Player | Statistics |
|---|---|---|---|
| Midwestern State | Passing | James Cooper Jr. | 10/25, 65 yards, INT |
| Midwestern State | Rushing | Jalen March | 9 rushes, 18 yards |
| Midwestern State | Receiving | Jalen Austin | 2 receptions, 26 yards |
| West Texas A&M | Passing | Kyle Brown | 3/10, 59 yards, TD |
| West Texas A&M | Rushing | Tray'vion McCoy-Gay | 15 rushes, 133 yards |
| West Texas A&M | Receiving | Noah Bogardus | 2 receptions, 34 yards |

=== At UT Permian Basin ===
West Texas A&M Buffaloes at UT Permian Basin Falcons – Game summary

| Quarter | 1 | 2 | 3 | 4 | OT | Total |
|---|---|---|---|---|---|---|
| Buffaloes | 7 | 7 | 10 | 10 | 6 | 40 |
| Falcons | 3 | 0 | 7 | 24 | 7 | 41 |

at Astound Broadband Stadium, Midland, Texas

- Date: September 23
- Game time: 6:00 p.m. CDT
- Game weather: Hot, 90 °F (32 °C)
- Game attendance: 7,018
- Referee: Joe Greer
- Box score, Recap

Game information
First quarter
- WT – Kenneath Redd 2-yard blocked punt return (Preston Gregg kick), 13:41. Buffaloes 7–0.
- UTPB – Rafael Vargas 38-yard field goal, 6:16. Buffaloes 7–3. Drive: 15 plays, 54 yards, 7:25.

Second quarter

- WT – Kris Sims 4-yard pass from Kanon Gibson (Preston Gregg kick), 5:41. Buffaloes 14–3. Drive: 13 plays, 60 yards, 6:36.

Third quarter

- WT – Preston Gregg 49-yard field goal, 8:01. Buffaloes 17–3. Drive: 5 plays, 28 yards, 1:49.
- UTPB – Ben Patterson 19-yard pass from Kenny Hrncir (Rafael Vargas kick), 5:53. Buffaloes 17–10. Drive: 6 plays, 75 yards, 2:08.
- WT – Isai Smallwood 9-yard pass from Kanon Gibson (Preston Gregg kick), 0:16. Buffaloes 24–10. Drive: 11 plays, 77 yards, 5:30.

Fourth quarter

- UTPB – Jeremiah Cooley 24-yard pass from Kenny Hrncir (Rafael Vargas kick), 13:36. Buffaloes 24–17. Drive: 5 plays, 69 yards, 1:32.
- WT – Preston Gregg 22-yard field goal, 6:37. Buffaloes 27–17. Drive: 14 plays, 80 yards, 6:53.
- UTPB – Deon Cook 18-yard pass from Kenny Hrncir (Rafael Vargas kick), 4:28. Buffaloes 27–24. Drive: 6 plays, 75 yards, 2:09.
- WT – Kanon Gibson 74-yard run (Preston Gregg kick), 3:27. Buffaloes 34–24. Drive: 2 plays, 75 yards, 1:01.
- UTPB – Rafael Vargas 35-yard field goal, 1:52. Buffaloes 34–27. Drive: 9 plays, 62 yards, 1:27.
- UTPB – Kenny Hrncir 1-yard run (Rafael Vargas kick), 0:15. Tied 34–34. Drive: 11 plays, 52 yards, 1:36.

Overtime

- UTPB – Kenny Hrncir 1-yard run (Rafael Vargas kick). Falcons 41–34. Drive: 5 plays, 25 yards.
- WT – Kenneath Redd 5-yard pass from Kanon Gibson (pass failed). Falcons 41–40. Drive: 5 plays, 25 yards.

| Statistics | WT | UTPB |
|---|---|---|
| First downs | 20 | 25 |
| Total yards | 380 | 498 |
| Rushing yards | 183 | 179 |
| Passing yards | 197 | 319 |
| Turnovers | 0 | 2 |
| Time of possession | 33:40 | 26:20 |

| Team | Category | Player | Statistics |
|---|---|---|---|
| West Texas A&M | Passing | Kanon Gibson | 23/26, 197 yards, 3 TD |
| West Texas A&M | Rushing | Kanon Gibson | 14 rushes, 123 yards, TD |
| West Texas A&M | Receiving | Isai Smallwood | 5 receptions, 64 yards, TD |
| UT Permian Basin | Passing | Kenny Hrncir | 19/40, 319 yards, 3 TD, INT |
| UT Permian Basin | Rushing | Kenny Hrncir | 20 rushes, 105 yards, 2 TD |
| UT Permian Basin | Receiving | Jeremiah Cooley | 5 receptions, 120 yards, TD |

The Buffaloes had a 24–10 lead entering the fourth quarter, but would be outscored 10–24 in the final quarter, with the Falcons tying the game at 34–34 with 15 seconds left in regulation. UTPB started overtime on offense and would score a touchdown to go up 41–34. WT would respond with a touchdown and went for two to end the game, but Kanon Gibson's pass was batted out of the end zone, securing the 41–40 victory for the Falcons.

=== Western Oregon ===
Western Oregon Wolves at West Texas A&M Buffaloes – Game summary

| Quarter | 1 | 2 | 3 | 4 | Total |
|---|---|---|---|---|---|
| Wolves | 7 | 14 | 9 | 7 | 37 |
| Buffaloes | 14 | 7 | 7 | 8 | 36 |

at Bain–Schaeffer Buffalo Stadium, Canyon, Texas

- Date: September 30
- Game time: 7:00 p.m. CDT
- Game weather: Sunny, 82 °F (28 °C)
- Game attendance: 6,553
- Referee: Joshua Bannerman
- Box score, Recap

Game information
First quarter
- WOU – Dominique Loggins 2-yard run (Charlie Shulkin kick), 12:11. Wolves 7–0. Drive: 7 plays, 75 yards, 2:49.
- WT – Kanon Gibson 36-yard run (Preston Gregg kick), 6:35. Tied 7–7. Drive: 3 plays, 43 yards, 1:01.
- WT – Brennan Ray 5-yard pass from Kanon Gibson (Preston Gregg kick), 0:00. Buffaloes 14–7. Drive: 4 plays, 37 yards, 2:00.

Second quarter

- WOU – Brenden Hodge 52-yard pass from Gannon Winker (Charlie Shulkin kick), 14:06. Tied 14–14. Drive: 2 plays, 55 yards, 0:50.
- WOU – Gannon Winker 2-yard run (Charlie Shulkin kick), 6:56. Wolves 21–14. Drive: 10 plays, 61 yards, 6:17.
- WT – Tyrie Tipton 30-yard pass from Kanon Gibson (Charlie Shulkin kick), 1:09. Tied 21–21. Drive: 3 plays, 41 yards, 0:41.

Third quarter

- WOU – Team safety, 13:52. Wolves 23–21.
- WOU – Keyvaun Eady 24-yard pass from Gannon Winker (Charlie Shulkin kick), 11:15. Wolves 30–21. Drive: 5 plays, 50 yards, 2:37.
- WT – J. T. Cavender 65-yard fumble return (Preston Gregg kick), 4:10. Wolves 30–28.

Fourth quarter

- WT – Kanon Gibson 9-yard run (Kanon Gibson run), 5:31. Buffaloes 36–30. Drive: 7 plays, 68 yards, 3:33.
- WOU – Brenden Hodge 2-yard pass from Gannon Winker (Charlie Shulkin kick), 0:02. Wolves 37–36. Drive: 10 plays, 69 yards, 5:23.

| Statistics | WOU | WT |
|---|---|---|
| First downs | 18 | 14 |
| Total yards | 374 | 315 |
| Rushing yards | 142 | 105 |
| Passing yards | 232 | 210 |
| Turnovers | 1 | 0 |
| Time of possession | 37:33 | 22:27 |

| Team | Category | Player | Statistics |
|---|---|---|---|
| Western Oregon | Passing | Gannon Winker | 13/19, 232 yards, 3 TD |
| Western Oregon | Rushing | Dominique Loggins | 32 rushes, 121 yards, TD |
| Western Oregon | Receiving | Keyvaun Eady | 5 receptions, 100 yards, TD |
| West Texas A&M | Passing | Kanon Gibson | 18/29, 210 yards, 2 TD |
| West Texas A&M | Rushing | Kanon Gibson | 12 rushes, 69 yards, 2 TD |
| West Texas A&M | Receiving | Kenneath Redd | 4 receptions, 68 yards |

=== At Texas A&M–Kingsville ===
West Texas A&M Buffaloes at Texas A&M–Kingsville Javelinas – Game summary

| Quarter | 1 | 2 | 3 | 4 | Total |
|---|---|---|---|---|---|
| Buffaloes | 0 | 7 | 7 | 7 | 21 |
| Javelinas | 7 | 7 | 7 | 7 | 28 |

at Javelina Stadium, Kingsville, Texas

- Date: October 7
- Game time: 7:00 p.m. CDT
- Game weather: Cloudy, 74 °F (23 °C)
- Game attendance: 5,374
- Referee: Kyle Fuehrer
- Box score, Recap

Game information
First quarter
- AMK – C. J. Odom 6-yard run (Gilbert Garza kick), 4:08. Javelinas 7–0. Drive: 4 plays, 45 yards, 2:03.

Second quarter

- AMK – Roger Hagan 8-yard run (Dillon Bredeson kick), 12:44. Javelinas 14–0. Drive: 10 plays, 65 yards, 4:52.
- WT – Montaye Dawson 1-yard run (Preston Gregg kick), 9:43. Javelinas 14–7. Drive: 6 plays, 50 yards, 2:53.

Third quarter

- WT – Tory Simmons 10-yard punt return (Preston Gregg kick), 12:30. Tied 14–14.
- AMK – Jaylin Smith 42-yard pass from Wade Freeman (Dillon Bredeson kick), 6:43. Javelinas 21–14. Drive: 3 plays, 65 yards, 1:17.

Fourth quarter

- AMK – Jackson Allen 28-yard pass from Wade Freeman (Dillon Bredeson kick), 11:31. Javelinas 28–14. Drive: 5 plays, 70 yards, 2:50.
- WT – Tyler Sweet 24-yard pass from Kanon Gibson (Preston Gregg kick), 8:17. Javelinas 28–21. Drive: 8 plays, 62 yards, 3:07.

| Statistics | WT | AMK |
|---|---|---|
| First downs | 10 | 19 |
| Total yards | 198 | 402 |
| Rushing yards | 43 | 154 |
| Passing yards | 155 | 248 |
| Turnovers | 1 | 1 |
| Time of possession | 26:01 | 33:59 |

| Team | Category | Player | Statistics |
|---|---|---|---|
| West Texas A&M | Passing | Kanon Gibson | 16/27, 155 yards, TD, INT |
| West Texas A&M | Rushing | Montaye Dawson | 9 rushes, 25 yards, TD |
| West Texas A&M | Receiving | Tyler Sweet | 6 receptions, 72 yards |
| Texas A&M–Kingsville | Passing | Wade Freeman | 14/22, 248 yards, 2 TD |
| Texas A&M–Kingsville | Rushing | C. J. Odom | 11 rushes, 48 yards, TD |
| Texas A&M–Kingsville | Receiving | Jaylin Smith | 3 receptions, 110 yards, TD |

=== Western New Mexico ===
Western New Mexico Mustangs at West Texas A&M Buffaloes – Game summary

| Quarter | 1 | 2 | 3 | 4 | Total |
|---|---|---|---|---|---|
| Mustangs | 0 | 15 | 6 | 6 | 27 |
| Buffaloes | 14 | 14 | 7 | 14 | 49 |

at Bain–Schaeffer Buffalo Stadium, Canyon, Texas

- Date: October 14
- Game time: 7:00 p.m. CDT
- Game weather: Sunny, 60 °F (16 °C)
- Game attendance: 8,462
- Referee: Tony Acosta
- Box score, Recap

Game information
First quarter
- WT – Ashton Dubose 16-yard run (Preston Gregg kick), 10:40. Buffaloes 7–0. Drive: 7 plays, 61 yards, 2:34.
- WT – Kenneath Redd 32-yard pass from Kanon Gibson (Preston Gregg kick), 6:11. Buffaloes 14–0. Drive: 7 plays, 46 yards, 3:05.

Second quarter

- WT – Tyrie Tipton 21-yard pass from Kanon Gibson (Preston Gregg kick), 12:35. Buffaloes 21–0. Drive: 11 plays, 78 yards, 5:52.
- WNM – Davey Morales 4-yard pass from Hunter Davis (Davey Morales run), 5:34. Buffaloes 21–8. Drive: 12 plays, 76 yards, 6:56.
- WT – Tray'vion McCoy-Gay 8-yard run (Preston Gregg kick), 2:24. Buffaloes 28–8. Drive: 6 plays, 62 yards, 3:02.
- WNM – Jeremiah Hartfield 53-yard pass from Hunter Davis (Tanner Bobic kick), 0:38. Buffaloes 28–15. Drive: 8 plays, 90 yards, 1:34.

Third quarter

- WT – Tray'vion McCoy-Gay 13-yard run (Preston Gregg kick), 9:54. Buffaloes 35–15. Drive: 10 plays, 51 yards, 5:01.
- WNM – Jeremiah Hartfield 5-yard pass from Hunter Davis (pass failed), 3:57. Buffaloes 35–21. Drive: 4 plays, 18 yards, 1:56.

Fourth quarter

- WT – Shakell Brown 1-yard pass from Kanon Gibson (Preston Gregg kick), 12:45. Buffaloes 42–21. Drive: 4 plays, 26 yards, 1:21.
- WT – Ashton Dubose 1-yard run (Mohsen Kanani kick), 6:16. Buffaloes 49–21. Drive: 8 plays, 46 yards, 3:49.
- WNM – Deuce Zimmerman 16-yard pass from Hunter Davis (pass failed), 1:03. Buffaloes 49–27. Drive: 10 plays, 75 yards, 5:13.

| Statistics | WNM | WT |
|---|---|---|
| First downs | 20 | 22 |
| Total yards | 363 | 409 |
| Rushing yards | 73 | 168 |
| Passing yards | 290 | 241 |
| Turnovers | 2 | 2 |
| Time of possession | 30:36 | 29:24 |

| Team | Category | Player | Statistics |
|---|---|---|---|
| Western New Mexico | Passing | Hunter Davis | 27/34, 290 yards, 4 TD |
| Western New Mexico | Rushing | Hunter Davis | 17 rushes, 60 yards |
| Western New Mexico | Receiving | Jeremiah Hartfield | 8 receptions, 112 yards, 2 TD |
| West Texas A&M | Passing | Kanon Gibson | 17/18, 236 yards, 3 TD |
| West Texas A&M | Rushing | Tray'vion McCoy-Gay | 19 rushes, 89 yards, 2 TD |
| West Texas A&M | Receiving | Tyrie Tipton | 4 receptions, 57 yards, TD |

=== At Central Washington ===
West Texas A&M Buffaloes at Central Washington Wildcats – Game summary

| Quarter | 1 | 2 | 3 | 4 | Total |
|---|---|---|---|---|---|
| Buffaloes | 0 | 7 | 0 | 7 | 14 |
| Wildcats | 3 | 10 | 3 | 14 | 30 |

at Tomlinson Stadium, Ellensburg, Washington

- Date: October 21
- Game time: 8:00 p.m. CDT/6:00 p.m. PDT
- Game weather: Cloudy, 65 °F (18 °C)
- Game attendance: 6,998
- Referee: Cameron McNie
- Box score, Recap

Game information
First quarter
- CWU – Josh Jones 38-yard field goal, 3:03. Wildcats 3–0. Drive: 7 plays, 44 yards, 4:08.

Second quarter

- WT – Shakell Brown 3-yard pass from Kanon Gibson (Preston Gregg kick), 10:16. Buffaloes 7–3. Drive: 14 plays, 75 yards, 7:47.
- CWU – Kennedy McGill 2-yard run (Josh Jones kick), 1:11. Wildcats 10–7. Drive: 10 plays, 68 yards, 4:32.
- CWU – Josh Jones 21-yard field goal, 0:00. Wildcats 13–7. Drive: 3 plays, 47 yards, 0:20.

Third quarter

- CWU – Josh Jones 31-yard field goal, 2:34. Wildcats 16–7. Drive: 11 plays, 35 yards, 4:22.

Fourth quarter

- CWU – Kennedy McGill 2-yard run (Josh Jones kick), 9:08. Wildcats 23–7. Drive: 12 plays, 71 yards, 7:18.
- CWU – Tyler Flanagan 21-yard run (Josh Jones kick), 4:29. Wildcats 30–7. Drive: 7 plays, 42 yards, 3:57.
- WT – Tyrie Tipton 10-yard pass from Kyle Brown (Preston Gregg kick), 1:16. Wildcats 30–14. Drive: 9 plays, 75 yards, 3:13.

| Statistics | WT | CWU |
|---|---|---|
| First downs | 13 | 22 |
| Total yards | 259 | 467 |
| Rushing yards | 84 | 335 |
| Passing yards | 175 | 132 |
| Turnovers | 1 | 1 |
| Time of possession | 21:57 | 27:56 |

| Team | Category | Player | Statistics |
|---|---|---|---|
| West Texas A&M | Passing | Kanon Gibson | 9/19, 111 yards, TD, INT |
| West Texas A&M | Rushing | Kanon Gibson | 10 rushes, 52 yards |
| West Texas A&M | Receiving | Tyler Sweet | 4 receptions, 74 yards |
| Central Washington | Passing | Kennedy McGill | 9/16, 132 yards |
| Central Washington | Rushing | Tyler Flanagan | 26 rushes, 186 yards, TD |
| Central Washington | Receiving | Demonte Horton | 4 receptions, 54 yards |

=== Angelo State ===
Angelo State Rams at West Texas A&M Buffaloes – Game summary

| Quarter | 1 | 2 | 3 | 4 | Total |
|---|---|---|---|---|---|
| Rams | 7 | 7 | 10 | 3 | 27 |
| Buffaloes | 3 | 0 | 0 | 7 | 10 |

at Bain–Schaeffer Buffalo Stadium, Canyon, Texas

- Date: October 28
- Game time: 7:00 p.m.
- Game weather: Cloudy, 49 °F (9 °C)
- Game attendance: 4,972
- Referee: Xavier Velazquez
- Box score, Recap

Game information
First quarter
- ASU – Alfred Grear 49-yard run (Bradley Larson kick), 11:28. Rams 7–0. Drive: 1 play, 49 yards, 0:08.
- WT – Preston Gregg 40-yard field goal, 3:12. Rams 7–3. Drive: 4 plays, 1 yard, 0:59.

Second quarter

- ASU – Kason Philips 7-yard pass from Gerald Gardner (Bradley Larson kick), 11:03. Rams 14–3. Drive: 13 plays, 83 yards, 7:02.

Third quarter

- ASU – Bradley Larson 26-yard field goal, 8:28. Rams 17–3. Drive: 6 plays, 63 yards, 2:57.
- ASU – Chad Pharies 19-yard run (Bradley Larson kick), 0:23. Rams 24–3. Drive: 6 plays, 51 yards, 3:30.

Fourth quarter

- ASU – Bradley Larson 25-yard field goal, 9:15. Rams 27–3. Drive: 8 plays, 61 yards, 3:54.
- WT – Ben McCreary 71-yard run (Preston Gregg kick), 0:16. Rams 27–10. Drive: 3 plays, 80 yards, 1:20.

| Statistics | ASU | WT |
|---|---|---|
| First downs | 20 | 9 |
| Total yards | 513 | 221 |
| Rushing yards | 396 | 171 |
| Passing yards | 117 | 50 |
| Turnovers | 2 | 3 |
| Time of possession | 34:43 | 25:17 |

| Team | Category | Player | Statistics |
|---|---|---|---|
| Angelo State | Passing | Gerald Gardner | 5/12, 107 yards, TD |
| Angelo State | Rushing | Kason Philips | 8 rushes, 115 yards |
| Angelo State | Receiving | Kyle Bradford | 1 reception, 42 yards |
| West Texas A&M | Passing | Kyle Brown | 8/25, 50 yards, 2 INT |
| West Texas A&M | Rushing | Ben McCreary | 4 rushes, 94 yards, TD |
| West Texas A&M | Receiving | Tyler Sweet | 3 receptions, 37 yards |

=== At Eastern New Mexico ===
West Texas A&M Buffaloes at Eastern New Mexico Greyhounds – Game summary

| Quarter | 1 | 2 | 3 | 4 | Total |
|---|---|---|---|---|---|
| Buffaloes | 10 | 3 | 0 | 14 | 27 |
| Greyhounds | 0 | 7 | 14 | 14 | 35 |

at Greyhound Stadium, Portales, New Mexico

- Date: November 4
- Game time: 1:00 p.m. CDT/12:00 p.m. CDT
- Game weather: Sunny, 63 °F (17 °C)
- Game attendance: 2,402
- Referee: Grady Dale
- Box score, Recap

Game information
First quarter
- WT – Preston Gregg 35-yard field goal, 8:28. Buffaloes 3–0. Drive: 14 plays, 57 yards, 6:32.
- WT – Tyler Sweet 19-yard pass from Ashton Dubose (Preston Gregg kick), 1:46. Buffaloes 10–0. Drive: 8 plays, 90 yards, 4:47.

Second quarter

- ENM – Mario Sanchez 1-yard run (Kaden Bell kick), 14:29. Buffaloes 10–7. Drive: 6 plays, 70 yards, 2:17.
- WT – Preston Gregg 32-yard field goal, 10:34. Buffaloes 13–7. Drive: 8 plays, 44 yards, 3:52.

Third quarter

- ENM – Mario Sanchez 2-yard run (Kaden Bell kick), 10:39. Greyhounds 14–13. Drive: 9 plays, 75 yards, 4:21.
- ENM – Andre Jones 55-yard pass from Mario Sanchez (Kaden Bell kick), 6:00. Greyhounds 21–13. Drive: 6 plays, 76 yards, 2:45.

Fourth quarter

- ENM – Mario Sanchez 3-yard run (Kaden Bell kick), 13:41. Greyhounds 28–13. Drive: 9 plays, 90 yards, 4:57.
- WT – Ashton Dubose 2-yard run (Preston Gregg kick), 10:52. Greyhounds 28–20. Drive: 7 plays, 75 yards, 2:49.
- ENM – Jonathan Watson 20-yard run (Kaden Bell kick), 4:18. Greyhounds 35–20. Drive: 5 plays, 84 yards, 3:06.
- WT – Kenneath Redd 16-yard pass from Weston Eget (Preston Gregg kick), 2:35. Greyhounds 35–27. Drive: 5 plays, 75 yards, 1:43.

| Statistics | WT | ENM |
|---|---|---|
| First downs | 24 | 20 |
| Total yards | 405 | 510 |
| Rushing yards | 130 | 343 |
| Passing yards | 275 | 167 |
| Turnovers | 1 | 1 |
| Time of possession | 28:47 | 31:13 |

| Team | Category | Player | Statistics |
|---|---|---|---|
| West Texas A&M | Passing | Weston Eget | 15/26, 251 yards, TD, INT |
| West Texas A&M | Rushing | Tyrie Tipton | 2 rushes, 45 yards |
| West Texas A&M | Receiving | Kenneath Redd | 6 receptions, 109 yards, TD |
| Eastern New Mexico | Passing | Mario Sanchez | 5/10, 167 yards, TD, INT |
| Eastern New Mexico | Rushing | Mario Sanchez | 20 rushes, 118 yards, 3 TD |
| Eastern New Mexico | Receiving | Andre Jones | 4 receptions, 162 yards, TD |
