= Kenny Hrncir =

American football player and coach (born 2001)

Current position
- Title: Offensive coordinator & quarterbacks coach
- Team: Gardner–Webb
- Conference: OVC–Big South

Biographical details
- Born: May 3, 2001 (age 25); Houston, Texas, U.S.
- Education: University of Texas Permian Basin (2023)

Playing career
- 2019–2022: East Central
- 2023: UT Permian Basin
- Position: Quarterback

Coaching career (HC unless noted)
- 2024 (spring): UT Permian Basin (QB/PGC)
- 2024–2025: UT Permian Basin (co-OC/QB)
- 2026–present: Gardner–Webb (OC/QB)

Accomplishments and honors

Awards
- LSC Offensive Player of the Year (2023); First Team All-LSC (2023)

Kenneth C. Hrncir (born May 3, 2001) is an American college football coach and former quarterback. He is the offensive coordinator and quarterbacks coach for the Gardner–Webb Runnin' Bulldogs, positions he has held since 2026. He played collegiately for the East Central Tigers before transferring to the UT Permian Basin Falcons.

== High school career ==
Hrncir attended and played for Needville High School in Needville, Texas. He finished his senior season completing 123 of 251 passes for 2,004 yards with 18 touchdowns and 7 interceptions, while also rushing for 1,334 yards and 11 touchdowns.

=== High school statistics ===
Year	GP	Passing								Rushing			
Year	GP	Cmp	Att	Pct	Yds	Y/A	TD	Int	Rtg	Att	Yds	Avg	TD
2017	9	89	170	.524	1,926	11.3	18	10	103.7	99	505	5.1	5
2018	12	123	251	.490	2,004	12.5	18	7	88.5	158	1,334	8.4	11
Career	21	212	421	.504	3,930	9.3	36	17	94.6	257	1,839	7.2	16

== College career ==
=== East Central ===
Coming out of high school, Hrncir committed to play at East Central University.

In Hrncir's final game with the Tigers, the 2022 Heritage Bowl against Texas–A&M Kingsville, he went 8-of-14 for 147 yards with a touchdown and no interceptions, averaging 18.3 yards per completion, as East Central won 38–21.

=== UT Permian Basin ===
Prior to the 2023 season, Hrncir transferred to the University of Texas Permian Basin (UTPB) in Odessa, Texas, after East Central head coach Kris McCullough was hired as the Falcons' new head coach.

In Hrncir's first game at UTPB, the Falcons scored a program record 96 points in the victory over NAIA Texas College. In week 4, against West Texas A&M, Hrncir and the Falcons rallied from two ten-point deficits in the fourth quarter to win 41–40 in overtime. Against the Buffaloes, Hrncir threw for 319 yards and three touchdowns along with 105 rushing yards and two rushing touchdowns and was named the Lone Star Conference (LSC) offensive player of the week. In week 8, against no. 19 Angelo State, Hrncir threw for four touchdowns as the Falcons won 28–23 and would be named the LSC offensive player of the week for the second time. The Following week, against Western Oregon, Hrncir threw for 379 yards and scored three touchdowns in the second quarter alone, two passing and one rushing, as the Falcons won 28–16; for his performance, Hrncir would be named LSC offensive player of the week for the second week in a row.

Following the conclusion of the regular season, Hrncir was named the Lone Star Conference Offensive Player of the Year.

=== College statistics ===
Year	Team	GP	Passing							Rushing			
Year	Team	GP	Cmp	Att	Pct	Yds	Avg	TD	Int	Att	Yds	Avg	TD
2019	East Central	11	150	257	58.3	1,876	12.5	5	6	138	630	4.6	8
2020	East Central	2	25	48	52.0	282	11.3	1	0	28	70	2.5	0
2021	East Central	11	153	290	52.8	2,175	14.2	18	13	106	341	3.2	7
2022	East Central	12	212	354	55.3	2,556	12.1	19	7	115	306	2.7	4
2023	UT Permian Basin	12	196	354	57.0	2,878	14.7	30	9	149	682	4.6	8
Career		48	735	1,302	56.4	9,761	13.3	73	35	536	2,029	3.8	27

== Coaching career ==
=== UT Permian Basin ===
After Hrncir's playing career, he was hired as the quarterbacks coach and passing game coordinator for his former team, UT Permian Basin under his former head coach, Kris McCullough. In June 2024, he was promoted to co-offensive coordinator and retained his role as quarterbacks coach.

== Personal life ==
Hrncir's father, Andy Hrncir, is an assistant football coach at Andrews High School in Andrews, Texas.
