= Ryan Lusby =

American football coach (1992)

Current position
- Title: Head coach
- Team: Dodge City
- Conference: KJCCC
- Record: 7–13

Biographical details
- Born: November 30, 1992 (age 33); Lucas, Texas, U.S.
- Education: Texas A&M University–Commerce (2013)

Playing career
- 2011–2012: Texas A&M–Commerce
- Position: Quarterback

Coaching career (HC unless noted)
- 2013–2014: Texas A&M–Commerce (GA)
- 2015–2017: Henderson State (QB)
- 2018: Coffeyville (OC)
- 2019–2021: Arkansas–Monticello (OC/QB)
- 2022: Arkansas–Monticello (AHC/OC)
- 2023: UT Permian Basin (AHC/OC)
- 2024–present: Dodge City

Head coaching record
- Overall: 7–13

Ryan Lusby (born November 30, 1992) is an American college football coach. He is the head football coach for Dodge City Community College, a position he has held since 2024. He coached for Texas A&M–Commerce, Henderson State, Coffeyville, Arkansas–Monticello, and UT Permian Basin. He played college football for Texas A&M–Commerce as a quarterback.

== Head coaching record ==
Year	Team	Overall	Conference	Standing	Bowl/playoffs
Dodge City Conquistadors (Kansas Jayhawk Community College Conference) (2024–present)
2024	Dodge City	6–4	3–3	4th	
2025	Dodge City	1–9	1–5	6th	
Dodge City:		7–13	4–8		
Total:		7–13			
