= 2025 West Texas A&M Buffaloes football team =

American college football season

2025 West Texas A&M Buffaloes football

Heritage Bowl champion

Heritage Bowl, W 28–27 vs. Arkansas Tech
- Conference: Lone Star Conference
- Record: 8–4 (7–2 LSC)
- Head coach: Josh Lynn (3rd season)
- Offensive coordinator: Justin Bane (1st season)
- Offensive scheme: Air raid
- Defensive coordinator: Justin Richter (1st season)
- Base defense: 3–4
- Home stadium: Bain–Schaeffer Buffalo Stadium

2025 Lone Star Conference football standings
| | Conf. | | | Overall |
| Team | W | | L | W | | L |
|---|---|---|---|---|---|---|
| No. 13 Central Washington $^ | 9 | – | 0 | 10 | – | 2 |
| No. 5 UT Permian Basin ^ | 7 | – | 2 | 11 | – | 3 |
| Western Oregon | 7 | – | 2 | 8 | – | 3 |
| West Texas A&M # | 7 | – | 2 | 8 | – | 4 |
| Angelo State | 4 | – | 5 | 6 | – | 5 |
| Texas A&M–Kingsville | 4 | – | 5 | 5 | – | 6 |
| Eastern New Mexico | 3 | – | 6 | 3 | – | 8 |
| Midwestern State | 3 | – | 6 | 3 | – | 8 |
| Western New Mexico | 1 | – | 8 | 2 | – | 9 |
| Sul Ross * | 0 | – | 9 | 0 | – | 11 |
$ – Conference champion; ^ – NCAA Division II playoff participant; # – Heritage Bowl participant * – Ineligible for postseason play due to transition from NCAA Division III; Rankings from AFCA poll

The 2025 West Texas A&M Buffaloes football team represented West Texas A&M University (WT) during the 2025 NCAA Division II football season as a member of the Lone Star Conference. The Buffaloes were led by third-year head coach Josh Lynn and played home games at Bain–Schaeffer Buffalo Stadium in Canyon, Texas.

The Buffaloes finished the regular season with an overall record of 7–4, going 7–2 in LSC play to finish in a three-way tie for third in the conference. WT received the conference's bid to the Heritage Bowl, where they defeated Arkansas Tech 28–27. This was the program's first winning season since 2021.

== Schedule ==
| Date | Time | Opponent | Site | Result | Attendance |
|---|---|---|---|---|---|
| August 28 | 7:00 p.m. | at No. 10 Western Colorado* | Mountaineer Bowl; Gunnison, CO | L 28–45 | 2,263 |
| September 4 | 7:00 p.m. | Colorado Mines* | Bain–Schaeffer Buffalo Stadium; Canyon, TX | L 31–33 | 5,854 |
| September 13 | 7:00 p.m. | at Western New Mexico | Altamirano Stadium; Silver City, NM | W 58–27 | 200 |
| September 20 | 8:00 p.m. | at No. 17 Central Washington | Tomlinson Stadium; Ellensburg, WA | L 6–52 | 5,001 |
| September 27 | 7:00 p.m. | Western Oregon | Bain–Schaeffer Buffalo Stadium; Canyon, TX | W 35–7 | 7,146 |
| October 4 | 7:00 p.m. | Sul Ross^{†} | Bain–Schaeffer Buffalo Stadium; Canyon, TX | W 56–7 | 7,234 |
| October 18 | 7:00 p.m. | Eastern New Mexico | Bain–Schaeffer Buffalo Stadium; Canyon, TX (Wagon Wheel) | W 43–14 | 4,879 |
| October 25 | 6:00 p.m. | at No. 23 UT Permian Basin | Astound Broadband Stadium; Midland, TX | L 6–22 | 2,543 |
| November 1 | 4:00 p.m. | Texas A&M–Kingsville | Bain–Schaeffer Buffalo Stadium; Canyon, TX | W 53–48 | 3,458 |
| November 8 | 1:00 p.m. | at Midwestern State | Memorial Stadium; Wichita Falls, TX | W 56–42 | 2,722 |
| November 15 | 4:00 p.m. | Angelo State | Bain–Schaeffer Buffalo Stadium; Canyon, TX | W 45–44 | 4,217 |
| December 6 | 12:00 p.m. | vs. Arkansas Tech* | Community National Bank & Trust Stadium; Corsicana, TX (Heritage Bowl) | W 28–27 | 4,685 |
*Non-conference game; ^{†}Homecoming; Rankings from AFCA Poll released prior to the game; All times are in Central time

== LSC media poll ==
The Lone Star Conference released its preseason prediction poll on July 24, 2025. The Buffaloes were predicted to finish sixth.

== Game summaries ==
=== At No. 10 Western Colorado ===
West Texas A&M Buffaloes at No. 10 Western Colorado Mountaineers – Game summary

| Quarter | 1 | 2 | 3 | 4 | Total |
|---|---|---|---|---|---|
| Buffaloes | 7 | 14 | 7 | 0 | 28 |
| No. 10 Mountaineers | 14 | 7 | 14 | 10 | 45 |

at Mountaineer Bowl, Gunnison, Colorado

- Date: August 28
- Game time: 7:00 p.m. CDT / 6:00 p.m. MDT
- Game weather: Sunny
- Game attendance: 2,263
- Referee: Charles Flinn
- Box score, Recap

Game information
First quarter
- WT – Sean Johnson 6-yard run (Levi Crowder kick), 12:45. Buffaloes 7–0. Drive: 5 plays, 75 yards, 2:15.
- WCU – Caden Measner 17-yard run (Adam Tasei kick), 8:21. Tied 7–7. Drive: 9 plays, 75 yards, 4:24.
- WCU – Kai Goetze 5-yard pass from Drew Nash (Adam Tasei kick), 1:14. Mountaineers 14–7. Drive: 7 plays, 68 yards, 4:34.

Second quarter

- WCU – Drew Nash 6-yard run (Adam Tasei kick), 11:14. Mountaineers 21–7. Drive: 8 plays, 64 yards, 3:55.
- WT – R. J. Martinez 21-yard run (Levi Crowder kick), 8:38. Mountaineers 21–14. Drive: 9 plays, 78 yards, 2:30.
- WT – Zach Phipps 24-yard pass from R. J. Martinez (Levi Crowder kick), 1:07. Tied 21–21. Drive: 8 plays, 73 yards, 4:13.

Third quarter

- WCU – Jace Perez 6-yard pass from Drew Nash (Adam Tasei kick), 6:44. Mountaineers 28–21. Drive: 14 plays, 75 yards, 8:16.
- WT – Drew Zamar 4-yard pass from R. J. Martinez (Levi Crowder kick), 5:46. Tied 28–28. Drive: 4 plays, 80 yards, 0:50.
- WCU – Drew Nash 1-yard run (Adam Tasei kick), 1:34. Mountaineers 35–28. Drive: 7 plays, 75 yards, 4:12.

Fourth quarter

- WCU – Gabe Schubarth 50-yard run (Adam Tasei kick), 12:52. Mountaineers 42–28. Drive: 4 plays, 68 yards, 1:57.
- WCU – Adam Tasei 29-yard field goal, 1:59. Mountaineers 45–28. Drive: 8 plays, 22 yards, 4:12.

| Statistics | WT | WCU |
|---|---|---|
| First downs | 24 | 25 |
| Total yards | 407 | 480 |
| Rushing yards | 145 | 268 |
| Passing yards | 262 | 212 |
| Turnovers | 3 | 0 |
| Time of possession | 20:09 | 39:51 |

| Team | Category | Player | Statistics |
|---|---|---|---|
| West Texas A&M | Passing | R. J. Martinez | 22/37, 262 yards, 2 TD |
| West Texas A&M | Rushing | Jayden Hibbler | 9 rushes, 91 yards |
| West Texas A&M | Receiving | Jamir Roberts | 2 receptions, 68 yards |
| Western Colorado | Passing | Drew Nash | 17/27, 173 yards, 2 TD |
| Western Colorado | Rushing | Drew Nash | 14 rushes, 95 yards, 2 TD |
| Western Colorado | Receiving | Victory David | 4 receptions, 54 yards |

=== Colorado Mines ===
Colorado Mines Orediggers at West Texas A&M Buffaloes – Game summary

| Quarter | 1 | 2 | 3 | 4 | Total |
|---|---|---|---|---|---|
| Orediggers | 14 | 14 | 3 | 2 | 33 |
| Buffaloes | 14 | 10 | 7 | 0 | 31 |

at Bain–Schaeffer Buffalo Stadium, Canyon, Texas

- Date: September 4
- Game time: 7:00 p.m. CDT
- Game weather: Sunny
- Game attendance: 5,854
- Referee: Esrael Silva
- Box score, Recap

Game information
First quarter
- WT – R. J. Martinez 3-yard run (Levi Crowder kick), 12:19. Buffaloes 7–0. Drive: 11 plays, 75 yards, 2:41.
- CSM – Braelon Tate 10-yard run (Preston Kyle kick), 7:54. Tied 7–7. Drive: 6 plays, 30 yards, 2:11.
- WT – R. J. Martinez 41-yard run (Levi Crowder kick), 5:06. Buffaloes 14–7. Drive: 9 plays, 75 yards, 2:48.
- CSM – Pierce Richards 8-yard pass from Joseph Capra (Preston Kyle kick), 1:40. Tied 14–14. Drive: 9 plays, 42 yards, 3:20.

Second quarter

- CSM – Nick Stone 8-yard pass from Joseph Capra (Preston Kyle kick), 9:49. Orediggers 21–14. Drive: 10 plays, 89 yards, 5:01.
- WT – R. J. Martinez 4-yard run (Levi Crowder kick), 3:59. Tied 21–21. Drive: 8 plays, 93 yards, 2:44.
- CSM – Pierce Richards 38-yard pass from Joseph Capra (Preston Kyle kick), 0:50. Orediggers 28–21. Drive: 8 plays, 66 yards, 3:09.
- WT – Levi Crowder 32-yard field goal, 0:00. Orediggers 28–24. Drive: 7 plays, 60 yards, 0:50.

Third quarter

- CSM – Kyle Preston 39-yard field goal, 10:24. Orediggers 31–24. Drive: 9 plays, 53 yards, 4:36.
- WT – Gene Sledge 1-yard run (Levi Crowder kick), 3:00. Tied 31–31. Drive: 19 plays, 71 yards, 7:24.

Fourth quarter

- CSM – R. J. Martinez tackled in own end zone, 14:08. Orediggers 33–31.

| Statistics | CSM | WT |
|---|---|---|
| First downs | 23 | 25 |
| Total yards | 382 | 416 |
| Rushing yards | 176 | 142 |
| Passing yards | 206 | 274 |
| Turnovers | 0 | 1 |
| Time of possession | 33:42 | 26:18 |

| Team | Category | Player | Statistics |
|---|---|---|---|
| Colorado Mines | Passing | Joseph Capra | 18/24, 206 yards, 3 TD |
| Colorado Mines | Rushing | Landon Walker | 30 rushes, 138 yards |
| Colorado Mines | Receiving | Pierce Richards | 7 receptions, 74 yards, 2 TD |
| West Texas A&M | Passing | R. J. Martinez | 33/47, 274 yards, INT |
| West Texas A&M | Rushing | R. J. Martinez | 23 rushes, 130 yards, 3 TD |
| West Texas A&M | Receiving | Drew Zamar | 6 receptions, 101 yards |

=== At Western New Mexico ===
West Texas A&M Buffaloes at Western New Mexico Mustangs – Game summary

| Quarter | 1 | 2 | 3 | 4 | Total |
|---|---|---|---|---|---|
| Buffaloes | 21 | 21 | 13 | 3 | 58 |
| Mustangs | 7 | 0 | 13 | 7 | 27 |

at Altamirano Stadium, Silver City, New Mexico

- Date: September 13
- Game time: 7:00 p.m. CDT / 6:00 p.m. MDT
- Game weather: Sunny
- Game attendance: 200
- Referee: Jon Sasse
- Box score, Recap

Game information
First quarter
- WT – Trevin Edwards 40-yard pass from R. J. Martinez (Levi Crowder kick), 12:48. Buffaloes 7–0. Drive: 6 plays, 81 yards, 2:05.
- WT – C'ing Blanton 50-yard pass from R. J. Martinez (Levi Crowder kick), 9:07. Buffaloes 14–0. Drive: 2 plays, 62 yards, 0:20.
- WNM – Deuce Zimmerman 5-yard pass from Connor Ackerley (Talan Tinsley kick), 1:32. Buffaloes 14–7. Drive: 8 plays, 61 yards, 3:34.
- WT – Trevin Edwards 62-yard pass from R. J. Martinez (Levi Crowder kick), 0:51. Buffaloes 21–7. Drive: 3 plays, 64 yards, 0:32.

Second quarter

- WT – Cam Wiley 1-yard run (Levi Crowder kick), 4:49. Buffaloes 28–7. Drive: 6 plays, 51 yards, 1:41.
- WT – Jayden Hibbler 4-yard run (Levi Crowder kick), 1:44. Buffaloes 35–7. Drive: 8 plays, 63 yards, 1:36.
- WT – Jamir Roberts 14-yard pass from R. J. Martinez (Levi Crowder kick), 0:17. Buffaloes 42–7. Drive: 2 plays, 73 yards, 0:37.

Third quarter

- WT – Sean Johnson 46-yard pass from R. J. Martinez (kick failed), 11:16. Buffaloes 48–7. Drive: 5 plays, 68 yards, 1:52.
- WNM – Anthony Flores 22-yard pass from Connor Ackerley (kick failed), 7:27. Buffaloes 48–13. Drive: 8 plays, 75 yards, 3:49.
- WT – C'ing Blanton 54-yard pass from Knox Porter (Levi Crowder kick), 5:27. Buffaloes 55–13. Drive: 7 plays, 90 yards, 1:52.
- WNM – Jacob Helt 13-yard pass from Connor Ackerley (Talan Tinsley kick), 0:04. Buffaloes 55–20. Drive: 13 plays, 75 yards, 5:23.

Fourth quarter

- WNM – Deuce Zimmerman 76-yard pass from Connor Ackerley (Talan Tinsley kick), 10:59. Buffaloes 55–27. Drive: 1 play, 76 yards, 0:12.
- WT – Levi Crowder 22-yard field goal, 9:18. Buffaloes 58–27. Drive: 5 plays, 22 yards, 1:29.

| Statistics | WT | WNM |
|---|---|---|
| First downs | 30 | 25 |
| Total yards | 684 | 446 |
| Rushing yards | 170 | 85 |
| Passing yards | 514 | 361 |
| Turnovers | 1 | 0 |
| Time of possession | 22:43 | 37:17 |

| Team | Category | Player | Statistics |
|---|---|---|---|
| West Texas A&M | Passing | R. J. Martinez | 19/28, 388 yards, 5 TD |
| West Texas A&M | Rushing | Cam Wiley | 8 rushes, 44 yards, TD |
| West Texas A&M | Receiving | Trevin Edwards | 7 receptions, 137 yards, 2 TD |
| Western New Mexico | Passing | Connor Ackerley | 27/43, 324 yards, 4 TD |
| Western New Mexico | Rushing | Diego Morales | 10 rushes, 23 yards |
| Western New Mexico | Receiving | Deuce Zimmerman | 5 receptions, 130 yards, 2 TD |

=== At No. 17 Central Washington ===
West Texas A&M Buffaloes at No. 17 Central Washington Wildcats – Game summary

| Quarter | 1 | 2 | 3 | 4 | Total |
|---|---|---|---|---|---|
| Buffaloes | 0 | 6 | 0 | 0 | 6 |
| No. 17 Wildcats | 21 | 14 | 14 | 3 | 52 |

at Tomlinson Stadium, Ellensburg, Washington

- Date: September 20
- Game time: 8:00 p.m. CDT / 6:00 p.m. PDT
- Game weather: Sunny, 77 °F (25 °C)
- Game attendance: 5,001
- Referee: Jerry Springer
- Box score, Recap

Game information
First quarter
- CWU – Kennedy McGill 7-yard run (David Weber kick), 14:15. Wildcats 7–0. Drive: 1 play, 7 yards, 0:07.
- CWU – Justice Taylor 3-yard run (David Weber kick), 10:59. Wildcats 14–0. Drive: 3 plays, 58 yards, 1:23.
- CWU – Mason Juergens 78-yard pass from Kennedy McGill (David Weber kick), 7:15. Wildcats 21–0. Drive: 2 plays, 80 yards, 0:51.

Second quarter

- CWU – Justice Taylor 31-yard run (David Weber kick), 10:40. Wildcats 28–0. Drive: 9 plays, 59 yards, 4:14.
- WT – C'ing Blanton 7-yard pass from R. J. Martinez (kick blocked), 7:25. Wildcats 28–6. Drive: 6 plays, 49 yards, 3:15.
- CWU – Samaje Featherstone 19-yard pass from Kennedy McGill (David Weber kick), 1:24. Wildcats 35–6. Drive: 8 plays, 77 yards, 1:40.

Third quarter

- CWU – Logan Brady 9-yard pass from Kennedy McGill (David Weber kick), 11:02. Wildcats 42–6. Drive: 7 plays, 75 yards, 3:58.
- CWU – Andrew Molly 3-yard pass from Kennedy McGill (David Weber kick), 4:15. Wildcats 49–6. Drive: 12 plays, 61 yards, 6:06.

Fourth quarter

- CWU – David Weber 35-yard field goal, 1:01. Wildcats 52–6. Drive: 10 plays, 33 yards, 3:48.

| Statistics | WT | CWU |
|---|---|---|
| First downs | 17 | 27 |
| Total yards | 232 | 528 |
| Rushing yards | -60 | 311 |
| Passing yards | 292 | 217 |
| Turnovers | 3 | 1 |
| Time of possession | 27:32 | 32:28 |

| Team | Category | Player | Statistics |
|---|---|---|---|
| West Texas A&M | Passing | R. J. Martinez | 19/42, 292 yards, TD, 2 INT |
| West Texas A&M | Rushing | Jayden Hibbler | 1 rush, 6 yards |
| West Texas A&M | Receiving | Zach Phipps | 3 receptions, 99 yards |
| Central Washington | Passing | Kennedy McGill | 10/16, 217 yards, 4 TD |
| Central Washington | Rushing | Kennedy McGill | 12 rushes, 62 yards, TD |
| Central Washington | Receiving | Mason Juergens | 1 reception, 78 yards, TD |

=== Western Oregon ===
Western Oregon Wolves at West Texas A&M Buffaloes – Game summary

| Quarter | 1 | 2 | 3 | 4 | Total |
|---|---|---|---|---|---|
| Wolves | 0 | 0 | 0 | 7 | 7 |
| Buffaloes | 6 | 6 | 10 | 13 | 35 |

at Bain–Schaeffer Buffalo Stadium, Canyon, Texas

- Date: September 27
- Game time: 7:00 p.m. CDT
- Game weather: Sunny, 80 °F (27 °C)
- Game attendance: 7,146
- Referee: Royce Smith
- Box score, Recap

Game information
First quarter
- WT – Drew Cox 32-yard field goal, 11:26. Buffaloes 3–0. Drive: 12 plays, 60 yards, 3:34.
- WT – Drew Cox 22-yard field goal, 7:05. Buffaloes 6–0. Drive: 10 plays, 66 yards, 3:02.

Second quarter

- WT – Sean Johnson 13-yard run (run failed), 14:50. Buffaloes 12–0. Drive: 14 plays, 68 yards, 6:29.

Third quarter

- WT – Jayden Hibbler 18-yard run (Drew Cox kick), 9:03. Buffaloes 19–0. Drive: 9 plays, 60 yards, 5:11.
- WT – Drew Cox 28-yard field goal, 6:11. Buffaloes 22–0. Drive: 6 plays, 20 yards, 2:45.

Fourth quarter

- WT – Gene Sledge 1-yard run (Drew Cox kick), 11:43. Buffaloes 29–0. Drive: 15 plays, 75 yards, 8:00.
- WOU – Dylan Camp 48-yard interception return (Logan South kick), 7:36. Buffaloes 29–7.
- WT – Sean Johnson 63-yard run (kick failed), 5:58. Buffaloes 35–7. Drive: 3 plays, 65 yards, 1:38.

| Statistics | WOU | WT |
|---|---|---|
| First downs | 4 | 33 |
| Total yards | 55 | 559 |
| Rushing yards | 10 | 238 |
| Passing yards | 45 | 321 |
| Turnovers | 2 | 1 |
| Time of possession | 16:11 | 43:49 |

| Team | Category | Player | Statistics |
|---|---|---|---|
| Western Oregon | Passing | Jordan McCarty | 9/20, 45 yards, INT |
| Western Oregon | Rushing | Terayon Sweet | 3 rushes, 5 yards |
| Western Oregon | Receiving | Cody Hall | 4 receptions, 25 yards |
| West Texas A&M | Passing | R. J. Martinez | 37/46, 313 yards |
| West Texas A&M | Rushing | Sean Johnson | 6 rushes, 96 yards, 2 TD |
| West Texas A&M | Receiving | Zach Phipps | 5 receptions, 69 yards |

=== Sul Ross ===
Sul Ross Lobos at West Texas A&M Buffaloes – Game summary

| Quarter | 1 | 2 | 3 | 4 | Total |
|---|---|---|---|---|---|
| Lobos | 0 | 0 | 0 | 7 | 7 |
| Buffaloes | 14 | 35 | 7 | 0 | 56 |

at Bain–Schaeffer Buffalo Stadium, Canyon, Texas

- Date: October 4
- Game time: 7:00 p.m. CDT
- Game weather: Sunny
- Game attendance: 7,234
- Referee: Joe Greer
- Box score, Recap

Game information
First quarter
- WT – Trevin Edwards 24-yard pass from R. J. Martinez (Drew Cox kick), 12:27. Buffaloes 7–0. Drive: 8 plays, 75 yards, 2:33.
- WT – Gene Sledge 1-yard run (Drew Cox kick), 6:49. Buffaloes 14–0. Drive: 11 plays, 59 yards, 4:59.

Second quarter

- WT – Drew Zamar 52-yard pass from R. J. Martinez (Drew Cox kick), 13:59. Buffaloes 21–0. Drive: 5 plays, 90 yards, 1:49.
- WT – R. J. Martinez 1-yard run (Drew Cox kick), 11:20. Buffaloes 28–0. Drive: 3 plays, 62 yards, 0:38.
- WT – Trevin Edwards 22-yard pass from R. J. Martinez (Drew Cox kick), 9:11. Buffaloes 35–0. Drive: 7 plays, 60 yards, 1:09.
- WT – Zach Phipps 45-yard pass from R. J. Martinez (Drew Cox kick), 6:15. Buffaloes 42–0. Drive: 3 plays, 60 yards, 0:56.
- WT – Jayden Hibbler 1-yard run (Drew Cox kick), 0:28. Buffaloes 49–0. Drive: 4 plays, 61 yards, 1:21.

Third quarter

- WT – Jamaal Joseph 5-yard run (Drew Cox kick), 1:22. Buffaloes 56–0. Drive: 14 plays, 69 yards, 6:35.

Fourth quarter

- SRS – Jose Trevino 1-yard run (Vicente Gariveay kick), 11:33. Buffaloes 56–7. Drive: 9 plays, 75 yards, 4:49.

| Statistics | SRS | WT |
|---|---|---|
| First downs | 13 | 32 |
| Total yards | 210 | 612 |
| Rushing yards | 164 | 243 |
| Passing yards | 46 | 369 |
| Turnovers | 0 | 0 |
| Time of possession | 29:39 | 30:21 |

| Team | Category | Player | Statistics |
|---|---|---|---|
| Sul Ross | Passing | Kye Callicoatte | 3/8, 36 yards |
| Sul Ross | Rushing | Jose Trevino | 19 rushes, 93 yards, TD |
| Sul Ross | Receiving | Yamil Oaxaca | 3 receptions, 39 yards |
| West Texas A&M | Passing | R. J. Martinez | 19/22, 332 yards, 4 TD |
| West Texas A&M | Rushing | Knox Porter | 7 rushes, 51 yards |
| West Texas A&M | Receiving | Drew Zamar | 2 receptions, 71 yards, TD |

=== Eastern New Mexico ===
Eastern New Mexico Greyhounds at West Texas A&M Buffaloes – Game summary

| Quarter | 1 | 2 | 3 | 4 | Total |
|---|---|---|---|---|---|
| Greyhounds | 0 | 7 | 0 | 7 | 14 |
| Buffaloes | 14 | 15 | 7 | 7 | 43 |

at Bain–Schaeffer Buffalo Stadium, Canyon, Texas

- Date: October 18
- Game time: 7:00 p.m.
- Game weather: Sunny, 75 °F (24 °C)
- Game attendance: 4,879
- Referee: Jeffrey Thigpen
- Box score, Recap

Game information
First quarter
- WT – Drew Zamar 66-yard pass from R. J. Martinez (Preston Gregg kick), 14:46. Buffaloes 7–0. Drive: 1 play, 66 yards, 0:09.
- WT – Jayden Hibbler 21-yard pass from R. J. Martinez (Preston Gregg kick), 5:02. Buffaloes 14–0. Drive: 9 plays, 89 yards, 2:15.

Second quarter

- WT – Jayden Hibbler 2-yard pass from R. J. Martinez (Preston Gregg kick), 11:24. Buffaloes 21–0. Drive: 6 plays, 62 yards, 1:55.
- ENM – Demarion Finch 6-yard run (Ryan Travis kick), 6:11. Buffaloes 21–7. Drive: 12 plays, 75 yards, 5:13.
- WT – Zach Phipps 42-yard pass from R. J. Martinez (Trevin Edwards run), 5:18. Buffaloes 29–7. Drive: 3 plays, 75 yards, 0:53.

Third quarter

- WT – Zach Phipps 11-yard pass from R. J. Martinez (Preston Gregg kick), 8:52. Buffaloes 36–7. Drive: 5 plays, 66 yards, 1:26.

Fourth quarter

- ENM – Demarion Finch 12-yard run (Ryan Travis kick), 11:12. Buffaloes 36–14. Drive: 10 plays, 84 yards, 4:05.
- WT – Gene Sledge 9-yard run (Preston Gregg kick), 8:54. Buffaloes 43–14. Drive: 6 plays, 75 yards, 2:18.

| Statistics | ENM | WT |
|---|---|---|
| First downs | 25 | 24 |
| Total yards | 333 | 502 |
| Rushing yards | 200 | 82 |
| Passing yards | 133 | 420 |
| Turnovers | 1 | 2 |
| Time of possession | 40:27 | 19:33 |

| Team | Category | Player | Statistics |
|---|---|---|---|
| Eastern New Mexico | Passing | Chad Ragle | 8/13, 72 yards, INT |
| Eastern New Mexico | Rushing | Demarion Finch | 27 rushes, 129 yards, 2 TD |
| Eastern New Mexico | Receiving | Gerry Gomez | 8 receptions, 68 yards |
| West Texas A&M | Passing | R. J. Martinez | 26/43, 424 yards, 5 TD, INT |
| West Texas A&M | Rushing | Gene Sledge | 9 rushes, 79 yards, TD |
| West Texas A&M | Receiving | Drew Zamar | 3 receptions, 99 yards, TD |

=== At No. 23 UT Permian Basin ===
West Texas A&M Buffaloes at No. 23 UT Permian Basin Falcons – Game summary

| Quarter | 1 | 2 | 3 | 4 | Total |
|---|---|---|---|---|---|
| Buffaloes | 0 | 6 | 0 | 0 | 6 |
| No. 23 Falcons | 10 | 7 | 2 | 3 | 22 |

at Astound Broadband Stadium, Midland, Texas

- Date: October 25
- Game time: 6:00 p.m. CDT
- Game weather: Sunny
- Game attendance: 2,543
- Referee: Jon Sasse
- Box score, Recap

Game information
First quarter
- UTPB – Traylen Suel 5-yard pass from Kanon Gibson (Angel Diaz kick), 9:47. Falcons 7–0. Drive: 12 plays, 75 yards, 5:13.
- UTPB – Angel Diaz 43-yard field goal, 2:56. Falcons 10–0. Drive: 11 plays, 48 yards, 5:20.

Second quarter

- UTPB – Jace Wyatt 14-yard pass from Kanon Gibson (Angel Diaz kick), 6:21. Falcons 17–0. Drive: 7 plays, 80 yards, 3:14.
- WT – Sean Johnson 5-yard pass from R. J. Martinez (kick failed), 4:55. Falcons 17–6. Drive: 7 plays, 75 yards, 1:26.

Third quarter

- UTPB – Team safety, 1:32. Falcons 19–6.

Fourth quarter

- UTPB – Angel Diaz 42-yard field goal, 11:31. Falcons 22–6. Drive: 10 plays, 26 yards, 5:01.

| Statistics | WT | UTPB |
|---|---|---|
| First downs | 6 | 30 |
| Total yards | 187 | 418 |
| Rushing yards | 18 | 125 |
| Passing yards | 169 | 293 |
| Turnovers | 0 | 0 |
| Time of possession | 13:46 | 46:14 |

| Team | Category | Player | Statistics |
|---|---|---|---|
| West Texas A&M | Passing | R. J. Martinez | 11/32, 169 yards, TD |
| West Texas A&M | Rushing | R. J. Martinez | 5 rushes, 17 yards |
| West Texas A&M | Receiving | Jamir Roberts | 2 receptions, 46 yards |
| UT Permian Basin | Passing | Kanon Gibson | 29/45, 293 yards, 2 TD |
| UT Permian Basin | Rushing | Kory Harris | 17 rushes, 70 yards |
| UT Permian Basin | Receiving | Traylen Suel | 7 receptions, 72 yards, TD |

=== Texas A&M–Kingsville ===
Texas A&M–Kingsville Javelinas at West Texas A&M Buffaloes – Game summary

| Quarter | 1 | 2 | 3 | 4 | Total |
|---|---|---|---|---|---|
| Javelinas | 14 | 14 | 7 | 13 | 48 |
| Buffaloes | 25 | 7 | 7 | 14 | 53 |

at Bain–Schaeffer Buffalo Stadium, Canyon, Texas

- Date: November 1
- Game time: 4:00 p.m. CDT
- Game weather: Sunny, 58 °F (14 °C)
- Game attendance: 3,458
- Referee: Jason Hickey
- Box score, Recap

| Statistics | TAMUK | WT |
|---|---|---|
| First downs | 36 | 26 |
| Total yards | 495 | 493 |
| Rushing yards | 138 | 93 |
| Passing yards | 357 | 400 |
| Turnovers | 3 | 1 |
| Time of possession | 32:43 | 27:17 |

| Team | Category | Player | Statistics |
|---|---|---|---|
| Texas A&M–Kingsville | Passing | Jack Turner | 37/56, 357 yards, 2 TD, 2 INT |
| Texas A&M–Kingsville | Rushing | Lawrence Starks | 23 rushes, 97 yards, 3 TD |
| Texas A&M–Kingsville | Receiving | King Phillips | 12 receptions, 105 yards, TD |
| West Texas A&M | Passing | R. J. Martinez | 30/39, 400 yards, 5 TD, INT |
| West Texas A&M | Rushing | R. J. Martinez | 12 rushes, 48 yards, TD |
| West Texas A&M | Receiving | Cristian Dixon | 3 receptions, 104 yards, 2 TD |

=== At Midwestern State ===
West Texas A&M Buffaloes at Midwestern State Mustangs – Game summary

| Quarter | 1 | 2 | 3 | 4 | Total |
|---|---|---|---|---|---|
| Buffaloes | 14 | 21 | 14 | 7 | 56 |
| Mustangs | 14 | 7 | 7 | 14 | 42 |

at Memorial Stadium, Wichita Falls, Texas

- Date: November 8
- Game time: 1:00 p.m. CST
- Game weather: Sunny
- Game attendance: 2,722
- Referee: Andy Dunklin
- Box score, Recap

| Statistics | WT | MSU |
|---|---|---|
| First downs | 34 | 27 |
| Total yards | 651 | 486 |
| Rushing yards | 214 | 75 |
| Passing yards | 437 | 411 |
| Turnovers | 3 | 1 |
| Time of possession | 31:32 | 28:28 |

| Team | Category | Player | Statistics |
|---|---|---|---|
| West Texas A&M | Passing | R. J. Martinez | 32/41, 437 yards, 5 TD, INT |
| West Texas A&M | Rushing | Jayden Hibbler | 21 rushes, 135 yards, 2 TD |
| West Texas A&M | Receiving | Zach Phipps | 5 receptions, 132 yards, 3 TD |
| Midwestern State | Passing | Sean Jastrab | 30/56, 411 yards, 5 TD, INT |
| Midwestern State | Rushing | Jaden Coulter | 18 rushes, 60 yards |
| Midwestern State | Receiving | Cedonyae Lott | 8 receptions, 145 yards, TD |

=== Angelo State ===
Angelo State Rams at West Texas A&M Buffaloes – Game summary

| Quarter | 1 | 2 | 3 | 4 | Total |
|---|---|---|---|---|---|
| Rams | 13 | 14 | 10 | 7 | 44 |
| Buffaloes | 7 | 10 | 14 | 14 | 45 |

at Bain–Schaeffer Buffalo Stadium, Canyon, Texas

- Date: November 15
- Game time: 4:00 p.m. CDT
- Game weather: Sunny, 79 °F (26 °C)
- Game attendance: 4,217
- Referee: Neil Dilts
- Box score, Recap

| Statistics | ASU | WT |
|---|---|---|
| First downs | 24 | 32 |
| Total yards | 548 | 565 |
| Rushing yards | 313 | 141 |
| Passing yards | 235 | 424 |
| Turnovers | 1 | 2 |
| Time of possession | 32:51 | 27:09 |

| Team | Category | Player | Statistics |
|---|---|---|---|
| Angelo State | Passing | Ayden Arp | 13/26, 189 yards, 2 TD, INT |
| Angelo State | Rushing | Ayden Arp | 20 rushes, 144 yards, TD |
| Angelo State | Receiving | Hunter Wallis | 3 receptions, 95 yards, TD |
| West Texas A&M | Passing | R. J. Martinez | 35/54, 424 yards, 5 TD, INT |
| West Texas A&M | Rushing | Jayden Hibbler | 14 rushes, 92 yards |
| West Texas A&M | Receiving | Sean Johnson | 14 receptions, 237 yards, 3 TD |

=== Vs. Arkansas Tech (Heritage Bowl) ===
2025 Heritage Bowl
Arkansas Tech Wonder Boys vs. West Texas A&M Buffaloes – Game summary

| Quarter | 1 | 2 | 3 | 4 | Total |
|---|---|---|---|---|---|
| Wonder Boys | 7 | 0 | 6 | 14 | 27 |
| Buffaloes | 0 | 14 | 14 | 0 | 28 |

at Community National Bank & Trust Stadium, Corsicana, Texas

- Date: December 6
- Game time: 12:00 p.m. CST
- Game weather: Sunny, 55 °F (13 °C)
- Game attendance: 4,685
- Referee: Brett Sledge
- Box score, Recap

Game information
First quarter
- AT – Keegan Vest 2-yard run (Logan Tymeson kick), 1:02. Wonder Boys 7–0. Drive: 14 plays, 80 yards, 6:53.

Second quarter

- WT – Sean Johnson 23-yard pass from R. J. Martinez (Drew Cox kick), 12:40. Tied 7–7. Drive: 12 plays, 92 yards, 3:22.
- WT – Zach Phipps 83-yard pass from R. J. Martinez (Drew Cox kick), 2:24. Buffaloes 14–7. Drive: 1 play, 83 yards, 0:10.

Third quarter

- WT – C'ing Blanton 8-yard pass from R. J. Martinez (Drew Cox kick), 11:15. Buffaloes 21–7. Drive: 8 plays, 82 yards, 2:21.
- AT – Carldell Sirmons 9-yard pass from Carter Hensley (kick blocked), 5:26. Buffaloes 21–13. Drive: 11 plays, 75 yards, 5:49.
- WT – R. J. Martinez 6-yard run (Drew Cox kick), 2:51. Buffaloes 28–13. Drive: 9 plays, 79 yards, 2:35.

Fourth quarter

- AT – Scout Brazeal 8-yard pass from Carter Hensley (Carter Hensley pass), 7:29. Buffaloes 28–21. Drive: 5 plays, 60 yards, 1:44.
- AT – Dominic Feliciano 2-yard run (pass failed), 0:09. Buffaloes 28–27. Drive: 18 plays, 63 yards, 5:19.

| Statistics | AT | WT |
|---|---|---|
| First downs | 25 | 27 |
| Total yards | 397 | 537 |
| Rushing yards | 162 | 130 |
| Passing yards | 235 | 407 |
| Turnovers | 0 | 2 |
| Time of possession | 38:38 | 21:22 |

| Team | Category | Player | Statistics |
|---|---|---|---|
| Arkansas Tech | Passing | Carter Hensley | 20/42, 235 yards, 2 TD |
| Arkansas Tech | Rushing | Bryson Roland | 12 rushes, 76 yards |
| Arkansas Tech | Receiving | Carldell Sirmons | 6 receptions, 72 yards, TD |
| West Texas A&M | Passing | R. J. Martinez | 32/44, 407 yards, 3 TD, INT |
| West Texas A&M | Rushing | Jayden Hibbler | 12 rushes, 90 yards |
| West Texas A&M | Receiving | Sean Johnson | 16 receptions, 180 yards, TD |
