= 2025 Sul Ross Lobos football team =

American college football season

2025 Sul Ross Lobos football
- Conference: Lone Star Conference
- Record: 0–11 (0–9 LSC)
- Head coach: Lee Hays (1st season)
- Offensive scheme: Spread
- Defensive coordinator: Cadron Davis (3rd season)
- Base defense: 3–4
- Home stadium: Jackson Field

2025 Lone Star Conference football standings
	Conf.			Overall
Team	W		L	W		L
No. 13 Central Washington $^	9	–	0	10	–	2
No. 5 UT Permian Basin ^	7	–	2	11	–	3
Western Oregon	7	–	2	8	–	3
West Texas A&M #	7	–	2	8	–	4
Angelo State	4	–	5	6	–	5
Texas A&M–Kingsville	4	–	5	5	–	6
Eastern New Mexico	3	–	6	3	–	8
Midwestern State	3	–	6	3	–	8
Western New Mexico	1	–	8	2	–	9
Sul Ross *	0	–	9	0	–	11
$ – Conference champion; ^ – NCAA Division II playoff participant; # – Heritage Bowl participant * – Ineligible for postseason play due to transition from NCAA Division III; Rankings from AFCA poll

The 2025 Sul Ross Lobos football team represented Sul Ross State University during the 2025 NCAA Division II football season as members of the Lone Star Conference (LSC). The Lobos were led by first-year head coach Lee Hays and played home games at Jackson Field in Alpine, Texas.

The 2025 season marked the third and final year of a transition period from Division III to Division II for the program. The Lobos were not eligible for the NCAA Division II playoffs but were eligible for the Heritage Bowl, conference awards, and the regular season conference title.

The Lobos failed to win a single game, finishing the season at 0–11. Sul Ross was outscored 129 to 666 by opponents and were shutout three times. The Lobos scored an average of 11.7 points per game while allowing 60.5 points per game.

== Schedule ==
Date	Time	Opponent	Site	Result	Attendance
August 30	7:00 p.m.	at UT Rio Grande Valley*	Robert and Janet Vackar Stadium; Edinburg, TX	L 0–66	12,726
September 13	7:00 p.m.	at Stephen F. Austin*	Homer Bryce Stadium; Nacogdoches, TX	L 0–63	3,102
September 20	3:05 p.m.	at Western Oregon	McArthur Field; Monmouth, OR	L 3–66	1,298
September 27	7:00 p.m.	Texas A&M–Kingsville	Jackson Field; Alpine, TX	L 3–52	563
October 4	7:00 p.m.	at West Texas A&M	Bain–Schaeffer Buffalo Stadium; Canyon, TX	L 7–56	7,234
October 11	7:00 p.m.	Midwestern State^{†}	Jackson Field; Alpine, TX	L 23–69	437
October 18	8:00 p.m.	at Western New Mexico	Altamirano Stadium; Silver City, NM (Battle for the Golden Tumbleweed)	L 42–45	500
October 25	7:00 p.m.	No. 19 Angelo State	Jackson Field; Alpine, TX	L 0–62	250
November 1	7:00 p.m.	at Eastern New Mexico	Greyhound Stadium; Portales, NM	L 34–40	2,753
November 8	7:00 p.m.	No. 7 Central Washington	Jackson Field; Alpine, TX	L 7–73	400
November 15	7:00 p.m.	at No. 15 UT Permian Basin	Astound Broadband Stadium; Midland, TX	L 10–74	2,572
*Non-conference game; ^{†}Homecoming; Rankings from AFCA Poll released prior to the game; All times are in Central time

== LSC media poll ==
The Lone Star Conference released its preseason prediction poll on July 24, 2025. The Lobos were predicted to finish last in the conference.

== Game summaries ==
=== At UT Rio Grande Valley (FCS) ===
Sul Ross Lobos (0–0) at UT Rio Grande Valley Vaqueros (FCS) (0–0) – Game summary

Quarter	1	2	3	4	Total
Lobos	0	0	0	0	0
Vaqueros (FCS)	28	21	14	3	66

at Robert and Janet Vackar Stadium, Edinburg, Texas

- Date: August 30
- Game time: 7:00 p.m. CDT
- Game weather: Sunny
- Game attendance: 12,726
- Referee: James Brookhart
- TV announcers (ESPN+): Mark May (play-by-play), Aaron Saenz (analyst) and Jaeda Rael (sideline)
- Box score, Recap

Game information
First quarter
- UTRGV – Xayvion Noland 50-yard pass from Eddie Lee Marburger (Brysen Gardner kick), 11:36. Vaqueros 7–0. Drive: 4 plays, 61 yards, 1:02.
- UTRGV – Ismael Smith Flores 6-yard pass from Eddie Lee Marburger (Brysen Gardner kick), 7:47. Vaqueros 14–0. Drive: 5 plays, 43 yards, 1:53.
- UTRGV – Tony Diaz 3-yard pass from Eddie Lee Marburger (Brysen Gardner kick), 4:36. Vaqueros 21–0. Drive: 2 plays, 51 yards, 0:52.
- UTRGV – Djouvensky Schlenbaker 1-yard run (Brysen Gardner kick), 3:06. Vaqueros 28–0. Drive: 2 plays, 53 yards, 0:45.

Second quarter

- UTRGV – Xayvion Noland 76-yard pass from Eddie Lee Marburger (Brysen Gardner kick), 12:56. Vaqueros 35–0. Drive: 4 plays, 90 yards, 1:10.
- UTRGV – T. J. Dement 1-yard run (Troop O'Neal kick), 5:15. Vaqueros 42–0. Drive: 12 plays, 74 yards, 5:15.
- UTRGV – Tavian Cord 61-yard pass from Eddie Lee Marburger (J. J. Contreas kick), 0:43. Vaqueros 49–0. Drive: 4 plays, 95 yards, 1:04.

Third quarter

- UTRGV – T. J. Dement 2-yard run (Troop O'Neal kick), 10:13. Vaqueros 56–0. Drive: 9 plays, 67 yards, 4:47.
- UTRGV – Fabian Garcia 6-yard run (J. J. Contreas kick), 2:44. Vaqueros 63–0. Drive: 7 plays, 80 yards, 4:21.

Fourth quarter

- UTRGV – Brysen Gardner 30-yard field goal, 10:27. Vaqueros 66–0. Drive: 8 plays, 38 yards, 4:54.

Statistics	SRS	UTRGV
First downs	6	29
Total yards	74	674
Rushing yards	33	236
Passing yards	41	438
Turnovers	1	1
Time of possession	29:23	30:37

Team	Category	Player	Statistics
Sul Ross	Passing	Andrew Martinez	9/12, 41 yards
Sul Ross	Rushing	Jose Trevino	7 rushes, 28 yards
Sul Ross	Receiving	Landen Drake	3 receptions, 15 yards
UT Rio Grande Valley	Passing	Eddie Lee Marburger	18/19, 365 yards, 5 TD
UT Rio Grande Valley	Rushing	Xayvion Noland	1 rush, 52 yards
UT Rio Grande Valley	Receiving	Xayvion Noland	2 receptions, 126 yards, 2 TD

=== At Stephen F. Austin (FCS) ===
Sul Ross Lobos (0–1) at Stephen F. Austin Lumberjacks (FCS) (0–2) – Game summary

Quarter	1	2	3	4	Total
Lobos	0	0	0	0	0
Lumberjacks (FCS)	21	35	7	0	63

at Homer Bryce Stadium, Nacogdoches, Texas

- Date: September 13
- Game time: 7:00 p.m. CDT
- Game weather: Sunny, 90 °F (32 °C)
- Game attendance: 3,102
- Referee: Matt Beck
- TV announcers (ESPN+): Rob Myers (play-by-play) and Hunter Taylor (analyst)
- Box score, Recap

Game information
First quarter
- SFA – Jerrell Wimbley 1-yard run (Carlos Alvarado kick), 11:31. Lumberjacks 7–0. Drive: 6 plays, 68 yards, 1:51.
- SFA – Richard Reese 64-yard pass from Sam Vidlak (Carlos Alvarado kick), 7:14. Lumberjacks 14–0. Drive: 5 plays, 80 yards, 1:20.
- SFA – Kylon Harris 32-yard pass from Sam Vidlak (Carlos Alvarado kick), 4:42. Lumberjacks 21–0. Drive: 1 play, 32 yards, 0:06.

Second quarter

- SFA – Jerrell Wimbley 12-yard run (Carlos Alvarado kick), 10:58. Lumberjacks 28–0. Drive: 3 plays, 28 yards, 0:53.
- SFA – Richard Reese 58-yard run (Carlos Alvarado kick), 8:13. Lumberjacks 35–0. Drive: 2 plays, 62 yards, 0:35.
- SFA – Saco Alofipo 0-yard fumble return (Carlos Alvarado kick), 8:00. Lumberjacks 42–0.
- SFA – Michael Woods 9-yard fumble return (Carlos Alvarado kick), 6:59. Lumberjacks 49–0.
- SFA – Isaiah Davis 30-yard pass from Gavin Rutherford (Carlos Alvarado kick), 1:24. Lumberjacks 56–0. Drive: 4 plays, 67 yards, 1:23.

Third quarter

- SFA – Anthony Williams 1-yard run (Carlos Alvarado kick), 2:45. Lumberjacks 63–0. Drive: 11 plays, 75 yards, 5:15.

Fourth quarter

- No scoring plays

Statistics	SRS	SFA
First downs	7	24
Total yards	-36	534
Rushing yards	-33	247
Passing yards	-3	287
Turnovers	4	0
Time of possession	30:22	29:38

Team	Category	Player	Statistics
Sul Ross	Passing	Andrew Martinez	1/7, 1 yard, INT
Sul Ross	Rushing	Kendrick Jefferson	9 rushes, 17 yards
Sul Ross	Receiving	David Smith	1 reception, 1 yard
Stephen F. Austin	Passing	Sam Vidlak	11/14, 211 yards, 2 TD
Stephen F. Austin	Rushing	Braden Lewis	9 rushes, 76 yards
Stephen F. Austin	Receiving	Richard Reese	2 receptions, 76 yards, TD

=== At Western Oregon ===
Sul Ross Lobos at Western Oregon Wolves – Game summary

Quarter	1	2	3	4	Total
Lobos	0	3	0	0	3
Wolves	21	14	21	10	66

at McArthur Field, Monmouth, Oregon

- Date: September 20
- Game time: 3:05 p.m. CDT/1:05 p.m. PDT
- Game weather: Sunny, 77 °F (25 °C)
- Game attendance: 1,298
- Referee: Brett Sledge
- Box score, Recap

Game information
First quarter
- WOU – Jermaine Land 6-yard run (Kyle Babcock kick), 14:01. Wolves 7–0. Drive: 5 plays, 19 yards, 0:54.
- WOU – Cody Hall 18-yard pass from Jordan McCarty (Kyle Babcock kick), 5:50. Wolves 14–0. Drive: 7 plays, 82 yards, 3:10.
- WOU – Nino Gama 17-yard interception return (Kyle Babcock kick), 4:32. Wolves 21–0.

Second quarter

- WOU – Terayon Sweet 15-yard pass from Jordan McCarty (Kyle Babcock kick), 14:14. Wolves 28–0. Drive: 7 plays, 68 yards, 2:25.
- WOU – Terayon Sweet 16-yard punt return (Kyle Babcock kick), 5:58. Wolves 35–0.
- SRS – Vicente Gariveay 37-yard field goal, 0:25. Wolves 35–3. Drive: 13 plays, 44 yards, 3:38.

Third quarter

- WOU – Jordan McCarty 1-yard run (Logan South kick), 11:24. Wolves 42–3. Drive: 7 plays, 75 yards, 3:29.
- WOU – Jaydan Burns 3-yard pass from Jordan McCarty (Logan South kick), 4:25. Wolves 49–3. Drive: 9 plays, 59 yards, 4:56.
- WOU – Isaiah Rickard 10-yard pass from Jordan McCarty (Logan South kick), 3:37. Wolves 56–3. Drive: 2 plays, 22 yards, 0:42.

Fourth quarter

- WOU – Armaad Hubbard 1-yard run (Logan South kick), 14:00. Wolves 63–3. Drive: 7 plays, 41 yards, 3:10.
- WOU – Logan South 26-yard field goal, 5:57. Wolves 66–3. Drive: 12 plays, 48 yards, 6:43.

Statistics	SRS	WOU
First downs	11	28
Total yards	141	464
Rushing yards	31	233
Passing yards	110	231
Turnovers	5	0
Time of possession	25:00	35:00

Team	Category	Player	Statistics
Sul Ross	Passing	Andrew Martinez	7/15, 89 yards, INT
Sul Ross	Rushing	David Smith	13 rushes, 31 yards
Sul Ross	Receiving	Twasky Smith	2 receptions, 42 yards
Western Oregon	Passing	Jordan McCarty	12/18, 220 yards, 4 TD
Western Oregon	Rushing	Jermaine Land	7 rushes, 52 yards, TD
Western Oregon	Receiving	Cody Hall	3 receptions, 65 yards, TD

=== Texas A&M–Kingsville ===
Texas A&M–Kingsville Javelinas at Sul Ross Lobos – Game summary

Quarter	1	2	3	4	Total
Javelinas	14	10	21	7	52
Lobos	3	0	0	0	3

at Jackson Field, Alpine, Texas

- Date: September 27
- Game time: 7:00 p.m. CDT
- Game weather: Sunny
- Game attendance: 563
- Referee: Jeff Williams
- Box score, Recap

Game information
First quarter
- TAMUK – Kenhide Atunrase 2-yard run (Daniel Gauna kick), 9:25. Javelinas 7–0. Drive: 6 plays, 50 yards, 3:42.
- SRS – Vicente Gariveay 39-yard field goal, 3:03. Javelinas 7–3. Drive: 13 plays, 65 yards, 4:44.
- TAMUK – Andre Branch 2-yard run (Daniel Gauna kick), 0:19. Javelinas 14–3. Drive: 8 plays, 66 yards, 2:36.

Second quarter

- TAMUK – Raymond Hudson 2-yard run (Daniel Gauna kick), 9:54. Javelinas 21–3. Drive: 10 plays, 71 yards, 3:40.
- TAMUK – Daniel Gauna 25-yard field goal, 3:56. Javelinas 24–3. Drive: 8 plays, 56 yards, 4:15.

Third quarter

- TAMUK – Andre Branch 43-yard pass from Jack Turner (Daniel Gauna kick), 12:19. Javelinas 31–3. Drive: 7 plays, 75 yards, 2:41.
- TAMUK – Edward Chumley 7-yard run (Daniel Gauna kick), 9:38. Javelinas 38–3. Drive: 2 plays, 48 yards, 0:30.
- TAMUK – Christian Kretz 15-yard pass from Jack Turner (Daniel Gauna kick), 3:46. Javelinas 45–3. Drive: 8 plays, 90 yards, 2:35.

Fourth quarter

- TAMUK – Andre Branch 11-yard run (Daniel Gauna kick), 9:46. Javelinas 52–3. Drive: 14 plays, 83 yards, 6:13.

Statistics	TAMUK	SRS
First downs	33	12
Total yards	632	177
Rushing yards	215	19
Passing yards	417	158
Turnovers	1	2
Time of possession	35:42	24:18

Team	Category	Player	Statistics
Texas A&M–Kingsville	Passing	Jack Turner	30/38, 393 yards, 2 TD, INT
Texas A&M–Kingsville	Rushing	Edward Chumley	18 rushes, 118 yards, TD
Texas A&M–Kingsville	Receiving	Christian Kretz	5 receptions, 121 yards, TD
Sul Ross	Passing	Andrew Martinez	12/27, 158 yards, INT
Sul Ross	Rushing	David Smith	8 rushes, 17 yards
Sul Ross	Receiving	Taribbean Ramirez	5 receptions, 70 yards

=== At West Texas A&M ===
Sul Ross Lobos at West Texas A&M Buffaloes – Game summary

Quarter	1	2	3	4	Total
Lobos	0	0	0	7	7
Buffaloes	14	35	7	0	56

at Bain–Schaeffer Buffalo Stadium, Canyon, Texas

- Date: October 4
- Game time: 7:00 p.m. CDT
- Game weather: Sunny
- Game attendance: 7,234
- Referee: Joe Greer
- Box score, Recap

Game information
First quarter
- WT – Trevin Edwards 24-yard pass from R. J. Martinez (Drew Cox kick), 12:27. Buffaloes 7–0. Drive: 8 plays, 75 yards, 2:33.
- WT – Gene Sledge 1-yard run (Drew Cox kick), 6:49. Buffaloes 14–0. Drive: 11 plays, 59 yards, 4:59.

Second quarter

- WT – Drew Zamar 52-yard pass from R. J. Martinez (Drew Cox kick), 13:59. Buffaloes 21–0. Drive: 5 plays, 90 yards, 1:49.
- WT – R. J. Martinez 1-yard run (Drew Cox kick), 11:20. Buffaloes 28–0. Drive: 3 plays, 62 yards, 0:38.
- WT – Trevin Edwards 22-yard pass from R. J. Martinez (Drew Cox kick), 9:11. Buffaloes 35–0. Drive: 7 plays, 60 yards, 1:09.
- WT – Zach Phipps 45-yard pass from R. J. Martinez (Drew Cox kick), 6:15. Buffaloes 42–0. Drive: 3 plays, 60 yards, 0:56.
- WT – Jayden Hibbler 1-yard run (Drew Cox kick), 0:28. Buffaloes 49–0. Drive: 4 plays, 61 yards, 1:21.

Third quarter

- WT – Jamaal Joseph 5-yard run (Drew Cox kick), 1:22. Buffaloes 56–0. Drive: 14 plays, 69 yards, 6:35.

Fourth quarter

- SRS – Jose Trevino 1-yard run (Vicente Gariveay kick), 11:33. Buffaloes 56–7. Drive: 9 plays, 75 yards, 4:49.

Statistics	SRS	WT
First downs	13	32
Total yards	210	612
Rushing yards	164	243
Passing yards	46	369
Turnovers	0	0
Time of possession	29:39	30:21

Team	Category	Player	Statistics
Sul Ross	Passing	Kye Callicoatte	3/8, 36 yards
Sul Ross	Rushing	Jose Trevino	19 rushes, 93 yards, TD
Sul Ross	Receiving	Yamil Oaxaca	3 receptions, 39 yards
West Texas A&M	Passing	R. J. Martinez	19/22, 332 yards, 4 TD
West Texas A&M	Rushing	Knox Porter	7 rushes, 51 yards
West Texas A&M	Receiving	Drew Zamar	2 receptions, 71 yards, TD

=== Midwestern State ===
Midwestern State Mustangs at Sul Ross Lobos – Game summary

Quarter	1	2	3	4	Total
Mustangs	14	28	14	13	69
Lobos	9	7	0	7	23

at Jackson Field, Alpine, Texas

- Date: October 11
- Game time: 7:00 p.m. CDT
- Game weather: Sunny, 80 °F (27 °C)
- Game attendance: 437
- Referee: Daniel Mena
- Box score, Recap

Game information
First quarter
- SRS – Yamil Oaxaca 27-yard pass from Kye Callicoatte (kick blocked), 11:01. Lobos 6–0. Drive: 9 plays, 73 yards, 3:54.
- MSU – Demonte Greene 4-yard pass from Sean Jastrab (Kohen Maroney kick), 8:09. Mustangs 7–6. Drive: 9 plays, 70 yards, 2:52.
- SRS – Vicente Gariveay 28-yard field goal, 4:07. Lobos 9–7. Drive: 10 plays, 78 yards, 3:57.
- MSU – Case Peacock 8-yard pass from Sean Jastrab (Kohen Maroney kick), 1:02. Mustangs 14–9. Drive: 7 plays, 75 yards, 3:05.

Second quarter

- MSU – Cedonyae Lott 26-yard pass from Sean Jastrab (Kohen Maroney kick), 11:22. Mustangs 21–9. Drive: 7 plays, 75 yards, 2:01.
- MSU – Conner Dunphy 12-yard pass from Sean Jastrab (Kohen Maroney kick), 5:48. Mustangs 28–9. Drive: 11 plays, 62 yards, 3:58.
- MSU – Reginald Williams 38-yard run (Kohen Maroney kick), 5:28. Mustangs 35–9. Drive: 1 play, 38 yards, 0:08.
- SRS – Yamil Oaxaca 37-yard pass from Isaiah Pena (Vicente Gariveay kick), 2:51. Mustangs 35–16. Drive: 1 play, 37 yards, 0:07.
- MSU – Jamarion Carroll 1-yard pass from Sean Jastrab (Kohen Maroney kick), 0:47. Mustangs 42–16. Drive: 9 plays, 61 yards, 1:56.

Third quarter

- MSU – Cedonyae Lott 38-yard pass from Sean Jastrab (Kohen Maroney kick), 13:23. Mustangs 49–16. Drive: 5 plays, 55 yards, 1:27.
- MSU – Cedonyae Lott 58-yard punt return (Kohen Maroney kick), 11:05. Mustangs 56–16.

Fourth quarter

- MSU – Jaden Coulter 31-yard run (run failed), 14:54. Mustangs 62–16. Drive: 7 plays, 65 yards, 2:49.
- MSU – Jaden Coulter 8-yard run (Kohen Maroney kick), 10:17. Mustangs 69–16. Drive: 5 plays, 63 yards, 3:01.
- SRS – Kye Callicoatte 6-yard run (Vicente Gariveay kick), 6:04. Mustangs 69–23. Drive: 9 plays, 88 yards, 4:07.

Statistics	MSU	SRS
First downs	31	19
Total yards	628	339
Rushing yards	338	130
Passing yards	290	209
Turnovers	0	1
Time of possession	26:27	33:33

Team	Category	Player	Statistics
Midwestern State	Passing	Sean Jastrab	25/32, 271 yards, 6 TD
Midwestern State	Rushing	Reginald Williams	15 rushes, 156 yards, TD
Midwestern State	Receiving	Jamarion Carroll	4 receptions, 75 yards, TD
Sul Ross	Passing	Kye Callicoatte	13/27, 172 yards, TD, INT
Sul Ross	Rushing	Kye Callicoatte	20 rushes, 86 yards, TD
Sul Ross	Receiving	Yamil Oaxaca	4 receptions, 101 yards, 2 TD

=== At Western New Mexico ===
Sul Ross Lobos at Western New Mexico Mustangs – Game summary

Quarter	1	2	3	4	Total
Lobos	7	7	21	7	42
Mustangs	14	10	7	14	45

at Altamirano Stadium, Silver City, New Mexico

- Date: October 18
- Game time: 8:00 p.m. CDT/7:00 p.m. MDT
- Game weather: Sunny
- Game attendance: 500
- Referee: Eric Stern
- Box score, Recap

Game information
First quarter
- WNMU – Connor Ackerley 2-yard run (Talan Tinsley kick), 12:54. Mustangs 7–0. Drive: 2 plays, 4 yards, 0:06.
- SRS – Justin Moon 39-yard punt return (Vicente Gariveay kick), 5:44. Tied 7–7.
- WNMU – Connor Ackerley 3-yard run (Talan Tinsley kick), 3:15. Mustangs 14–7. Drive: 6 plays, 63 yards, 2:18.

Second quarter

- WNMU – Talan Tinsley 16-yard field goal, 13:11. Mustangs 17–7. Drive: 19 plays, 49 yards, 2:17.
- WNMU – Anthony Flores 9-yard pass from Connor Ackerley (Talan Tinsley kick), 6:50. Mustangs 24–7. Drive: 10 plays, 95 yards, 5:04.
- SRS – Cade Hays 5-yard pass from Kye Callicoatte (Vicente Gariveay kick), 2:00. Mustangs 24–14. Drive: 1 play, 5 yards, 0:07.

Third quarter

- SRS – Kye Callicoatte 3-yard run (Vicente Gariveay kick), 12:27. Mustangs 24–21. Drive: 2 plays, 75 yards, 0:36.
- SRS – Jose Trevino 5-yard run (Vicente Gariveay kick), 4:14. Lobos 28–24. Drive: 13 plays, 96 yards, 4:50.
- WNMU – Eddie Byrd III 67-yard interception return (Talan Tinsley kick), 1:02. Mustangs 31–28.
- SRS – Kyree Payton 90-yard kickoff return (Vicente Gariveay kick), 0:49. Lobos 35–31.

Fourth quarter

- WNMU – Davey Morales 7-yard pass from Connor Ackerley (Talan Tinsley kick), 8:18. Mustangs 38–35. Drive: 8 plays, 75 yards, 3:32.
- SRS – Kye Callicoatte 5-yard run (Vicente Gariveay kick), 4:56. Lobos 42–38. Drive: 8 plays, 75 yards, 3:22.
- WNMU – Anthony Flores 18-yard pass from Connor Ackerley (Talan Tinsley kick), 2:40. Mustangs 45–42. Drive: 8 plays, 54 yards, 1:53.

Statistics	SRS	WNMU
First downs	22	20
Total yards	381	434
Rushing yards	178	212
Passing yards	203	222
Turnovers	4	2
Time of possession	27:14	32:46

Team	Category	Player	Statistics
Sul Ross	Passing	Kye Callicoatte	16/29, 203 yards, TD, 2 INT
Sul Ross	Rushing	Jose Trevino	14 rushes, 89 yards, TD
Sul Ross	Receiving	Taribbean Ramirez	8 receptions, 117 yards
Western New Mexico	Passing	Connor Ackerley	21/28, 222 yards, 3 TD
Western New Mexico	Rushing	Zay Savoie	14 rushes, 122 yards
Western New Mexico	Receiving	Davey Morales	7 receptions, 72 yards, TD

=== No. 19 Angelo State ===
No. 19 Angelo State Rams at Sul Ross Lobos – Game summary

Quarter	1	2	3	4	Total
No. 19 Rams	14	21	14	13	62
Lobos	0	0	0	0	0

at Jackson Field, Alpine, Texas

- Date: October 25
- Game time: 7:00 p.m. CDT
- Game weather: Sunny
- Game attendance: 250
- Referee: Jerry Springer
- Box score, Recap

Game information
First quarter
- ASU – Jayden Jones 10-yard run (Rance Purser kick), 8:56. Rams 7–0. Drive: 9 plays, 69 yards, 3:37.
- ASU – Corey Sandolph 4-yard pass from Braeden Fuller (Rance Purser kick), 7:28. Rams 14–0. Drive: 2 plays, 4 yards, 0:38.

Second quarter

- ASU – Jayden Jones 2-yard run (Rance Purser kick), 7:12. Rams 21–0. Drive: 6 plays, 51 yards, 2:27.
- ASU – Jayden Jones 2-yard run (Rance Purser kick), 3:23. Rams 28–0. Drive: 4 plays, 64 yards, 1:44.
- ASU – Kaeden Smith 5-yard run (Rance Purser kick), 0:10. Rams 35–0. Drive: 9 plays, 56 yards, 1:41.

Third quarter

- ASU – Dorian Morris 15-yard pass from Ayden Arp (Rance Purser kick), 11:15. Rams 42–0. Drive: 9 plays, 75 yards, 3:45.
- ASU – Hunter Wallis 31-yard pass from Ayden Arp (Rance Purser kick), 8:01. Rams 49–0. Drive: 5 plays, 61 yards, 2:28.

Fourth quarter

- ASU – Hunter Wallis 22-yard pass from Ayden Arp (Rance Purser kick), 13:36. Rams 56–0. Drive: 11 plays, 81 yards, 6:24.
- ASU – Ashton Dickens 6-yard run (kick blocked), 5:49. Rams 62–0. Drive: 10 plays, 62 yards, 6:51.

Statistics	ASU	SRS
First downs	31	13
Total yards	617	205
Rushing yards	375	125
Passing yards	242	80
Turnovers	2	0
Time of possession	38:09	21:51

Team	Category	Player	Statistics
Angelo State	Passing	Ayden Arp	9/11, 127 yards, 3 TD
Angelo State	Rushing	Jayden Jones	18 rushes, 113 yards, 3 TD
Angelo State	Receiving	Anthony Jones	5 receptions, 121 yards
Sul Ross	Passing	Kye Callicoatte	9/22, 80 yards
Sul Ross	Rushing	Kye Callicoatte	17 rushes, 80 yards
Sul Ross	Receiving	Yamil Oaxaca	2 receptions, 37 yards

=== At Eastern New Mexico ===
Sul Ross Lobos at Eastern New Mexico Greyhounds – Game summary

Quarter	1	2	3	4	Total
Lobos	10	0	10	14	34
Greyhounds	6	14	7	13	40

at Greyhound Stadium, Portales, New Mexico

- Date: November 1
- Game time: 7:00 p.m. CDT/6:00 p.m. MDT
- Game weather: Sunny, 62 °F (17 °C)
- Game attendance: 2,753
- Referee: Joe Greer
- Box score, Recap

Game information
First quarter
- SRS – Jose Trevino 5-yard run (Vicente Gariveay kick), 12:23. Lobos 7–0. Drive: 9 plays, 65 yards, 2:37.
- ENMU – Jarius Stewart 10-yard run (kick blocked), 5:41. Lobos 7–6. Drive: 9 plays, 54 yards, 4:33.
- SRS – Vicente Gariveay 25-yard field goal, 1:09. Lobos 10–6. Drive: 13 plays, 58 yards, 4:27.

Second quarter

- ENMU – Demarion Finch 2-yard run (Ryan Travis kick), 6:37. Greyhounds 13–10. Drive: 19 plays, 92 yards, 9:23.
- ENMU – Jarius Stewart 22-yard run (Ryan Travis kick), 1:54. Greyhounds 20–10. Drive: 9 plays, 88 yards, 3:42.

Third quarter

- ENMU – Demarion Finch 2-yard run (Ryan Travis kick), 9:38. Greyhounds 27–10. Drive: 10 plays, 75 yards, 5:15.
- SRS – Jose Trevino 60-yard run (Vicente Gariveay kick), 8:23. Greyhounds 27–17. Drive: 4 plays, 75 yards, 1:09.
- SRS – Vicente Gariveay 32-yard field goal, 2:01. Greyhounds 27–20. Drive: 7 plays, 65 yards, 3:29.

Fourth quarter

- ENMU – Gerry Gomez 12-yard pass from Jarius Stewart (run failed), 14:54. Greyhounds 33–20. Drive: 5 plays, 55 yards, 0:06.
- ENMU – William Reynolds 1-yard run (Ryan Travis kick), 9:59. Greyhounds 40–20. Drive: 10 plays, 90 yards, 4:27.
- SRS – Jose Trevino 3-yard run (Vicente Gariveay kick), 7:33. Greyhounds 40–27. Drive: 7 plays, 72 yards, 2:20.
- SRS – Landen Drake 26-yard pass from Kye Callicoatte (Vicente Gariveay kick), 2:33. Greyhounds 40–34. Drive: 10 plays, 80 yards, 2:47.

Statistics	SRS	ENMU
First downs	23	26
Total yards	501	490
Rushing yards	199	444
Passing yards	302	46
Turnovers	0	1
Time of possession	23:04	36:56

Team	Category	Player	Statistics
Sul Ross	Passing	Kye Callicoatte	18/40, 302 yards, TD
Sul Ross	Rushing	Kye Callicoatte	14 rushes, 96 yards
Sul Ross	Receiving	Taribbean Ramirez	3 receptions, 87 yards
Eastern New Mexico	Passing	Chad Ragle	1/2, 34 yards
Eastern New Mexico	Rushing	Jarius Stewart	23 rushes, 160 yards, 2 TD
Eastern New Mexico	Receiving	Gerry Romez	2 receptions, 46 yards, TD

=== No. 7 Central Washington ===
No. 7 Central Washington Wildcats at Sul Ross Lobos – Game summary

Quarter	1	2	3	4	Total
No. 7 Wildcats	14	21	17	21	73
Lobos	0	7	0	0	7

at Jackson Field, Alpine, Texas

- Date: November 8
- Game time: 7:00 p.m. CST
- Game weather: Sunny
- Game attendance: 400
- Referee: Neil Dilts
- Box score, Recap

Game information
First quarter
- CWU – Justice Taylor 44-yard run (David Weber kick), 13:40. Wildcats 7–0. Drive: 3 plays, 53 yards, 1:20.
- CWU – Kennedy McGill 9-yard run (David Weber kick), 0:00. Wildcats 14–0. Drive: 10 plays, 55 yards, 5:40.

Second quarter

- CWU – Justice Taylor 10-yard run (David Weber kick), 11:59. Wildcats 21–0. Drive: 4 plays, 64 yards, 1:39.
- CWU – Kennedy McGill 15-yard run (David Weber kick), 4:35. Wildcats 28–0. Drive: 11 plays, 73 yards, 5:41.
- CWU – Justice Taylor 4-yard pass from Kennedy McGill (David Weber kick), 1:55. Wildcats 35–0. Drive: 5 plays, 30 yards, 2:05.
- SRS – Yamil Oaxaca 64-yard pass from Kye Callicoatte (Vicente Gariveay kick), 1:27. Wildcats 35–7. Drive: 2 plays, 75 yards, 0:28.

Third quarter

- CWU – David Weber 36-yard field goal, 10:27. Wildcats 38–7. Drive: 10 plays, 56 yards, 4:33.
- CWU – Ryder Bumgarner 1-yard run (David Weber kick), 7:22. Wildcats 45–7. Drive: 3 plays, 36 yards, 1:17.
- CWU – Samaje Featherstone 32-yard pass from Caleb Christensen (David Weber kick), 3:42. Wildcats 52–7. Drive: 4 plays, 41 yards, 2:12.

Fourth quarter

- CWU – A. J. Perez 21-yard pass from Caleb Christensen (David Weber kick), 14:51. Wildcats 59–7. Drive: 7 plays, 48 yards, 3:25.
- CWU – Ki'Marree Washington 3-yard run (David Weber kick), 11:01. Wildcats 66–7. Drive: 4 plays, 20 yards, 1:41.
- CWU – Antoine Lee 27-yard run (David Weber kick), 6:21. Wildcats 73–7. Drive: 5 plays, 76 yards, 2:27.

Statistics	CWU	SRS
First downs	28	10
Total yards	591	237
Rushing yards	394	10
Passing yards	197	227
Turnovers	0	3
Time of possession	37:20	22:40

Team	Category	Player	Statistics
Central Washington	Passing	Kennedy McGill	12/20, 135 yards, TD
Central Washington	Rushing	Justice Taylor	19 rushes, 157 yards, 2 TD
Central Washington	Receiving	Samaje Featherstone	4 receptions, 85 yards, TD
Sul Ross	Passing	Kye Callicoatte	14/31, 227 yards, TD, 2 INT
Sul Ross	Rushing	Kendrick Jefferson	6 rushes, 30 yards
Sul Ross	Receiving	Yamil Oaxaca	3 receptions, 106 yards, TD

=== At No. 15 UT Permian Basin ===
Sul Ross Lobos at No. 15 UT Permian Basin Falcons – Game summary

Quarter	1	2	3	4	Total
Lobos	7	3	0	0	10
No. 15 Falcons	16	16	14	28	74

at Astound Broadband Stadium, Midland, Texas

- Date: November 15
- Game time: 7:00 p.m. CST
- Game weather: Sunny
- Game attendance: 2,572
- Referee: John Grieger
- Box score, Recap

Game information
First quarter
- UTPB – T. J. McKenzie 4-yard pass from Kanon Gibson (Cash Walker run), 7:52. Falcons 8–0. Drive: 12 plays, 62 yards, 3:27.
- SRS – Taribbean Ramirez 41-yard pass from Kye Callicoatte (Vicente Gariveay kick), 4:58. Falcons 8–7. Drive: 7 plays, 79 yards, 2:39.
- UTPB – Jaylon Tillman 8-yard pass from Kanon Gibson (Caleb Sedegan run), 2:30. Falcons 16–7. Drive: 8 plays, 70 yards, 2:23.

Second quarter

- UTPB – Kylin Mathis 30-yard pass from Kanon Gibson (run failed), 7:41. Falcons 22–7. Drive: 5 plays, 70 yards, 2:14.
- UTPB – Tristan Exline 1-yard run (Angel Diaz kick), 6:50. Falcons 29–7. Drive: 2 plays, 5 yards, 0:40.
- UTPB – Angel Diaz 50-yard field goal, 4:08. Falcons 32–7. Drive: 6 plays, 20 yards, 1:43.
- SRS – Vicente Gariveay 30-yard field goal, 2:13. Falcons 32–10. Drive: 7 plays, 52 yards, 1:55.

Third quarter

- UTPB – Traylen Suel 16-yard pass from Kanon Gibson (Angel Diaz kick), 12:33. Falcons 39–10. Drive: 9 plays, 69 yards, 2:20.
- UTPB – Jaylon Tillman 18-yard pass from Kanon Gibson (Angel Diaz kick), 7:00. Falcons 46–10. Drive: 10 plays, 57 yards, 2:40.

Fourth quarter

- UTPB – Kory Harris 4-yard run (Angel Diaz kick), 13:50. Falcons 53–10. Drive: 11 plays, 87 yards, 5:40.
- UTPB – Crimson Mathis 47-yard pass from Issac Mooring (Angel Diaz kick), 4:53. Falcons 60–10. Drive: 7 plays, 86 yards, 2:23.
- UTPB – Damien Johnson 20-yard run (Angel Diaz kick), 1:50. Falcons 67–10. Drive: 5 plays, 47 yards, 1:30.
- UTPB – Anthony Dansby 1-yard run (Angel Diaz kick), 1:03. Falcons 74–10. Drive: 2 plays, 23 yards, 0:12.

Statistics	SRS	UTPB
First downs	20	34
Total yards	342	639
Rushing yards	106	220
Passing yards	236	419
Turnovers	2	1
Time of possession	30:11	29:49

Team	Category	Player	Statistics
Sul Ross	Passing	Kye Callicoatte	12/30, 189 yards, TD
Sul Ross	Rushing	Jose Trevino	10 rushes, 67 yards
Sul Ross	Receiving	Yamil Oaxaca	5 receptions, 134 yards
UT Permian Basin	Passing	Kanon Gibson	26/50, 296 yards, 5 TD, INT
UT Permian Basin	Rushing	Kory Harris	19 rushes, 74 yards, TD
UT Permian Basin	Receiving	T. J. McKenzie	4 receptions, 69 yards, TD

== Roster ==
2025 Sul Ross Lobos football team roster
Players
Coaches
Offense

Pos.	#	Name	Class
WR	0	Yamil Oaxaca	Jr
RB	1	David Smith	So
QB	6	Kye Callicoatte	So
TE	7	Justin Moon	Sr
RB	8	Kendrick Jefferson	Sr
WR	9	Will Craven	Jr
QB	11	Andrew Martinez	Sr
WR	14	Liam Lowe	So
RB	15	Kyree Payton	Jr
QB	18	Victor Jesus Gutierrez	So
WR	19	Landen Drake	Jr
WR	22	Taribbean Ramirez	Sr
WR	25	Patrick Washington	Fr
WR	28	Omarion Dumas	So
RB	30	Jose Trevino	Fr
WR	35	Jeremy McCullough	Fr
WR	37	Kendall Bird	So
RB	38	Diego Oaxaca	So
FB	44	Cade Hays	Fr
OL	54	Chris Edwards	Fr
OL	63	Josh Harris	Fr
OL	66	Peyton Wilson	Fr
OL	67	Travyon Young	Jr
OL	70	Nehemiah Griffin	Fr
OL	71	Judson Cook	So
OL	72	Jose Chavez	Fr
OL	74	Cyrus Beckley	Fr
OL	75	Shaw Stutzman	Fr
WR	80	Isaiah Pena	Jr
WR	81	Ryan Van Roekel	Fr
WR	82	Josh Nunez	Fr
WR	83	Kameron Williams	Fr
TE	85	Diego Coleman	So
TE	88	Dane Hennessee	Fr
WR		Phillip Conley	Fr
RB		Samuel Green	Jr
OL		Marcus Jefferson Jr.	So
FB		Cayden Jones	Fr
OL		Sebastian Lefeiloai-Momoli	Sr
WR		Case McGuire	Fr
WR		Terence Norman Jr.	GS
WR		Jarvis Scott	Fr
QB		Kelly Stevens	Fr
WR		Trajan Toliver	Jr
WR		Jamar Turpin	Fr
RB		Keyshaun Williams	Fr

Defense

Pos.	#	Name	Class
LB	0	Daryl Minor Jr.	Sr
DB	1	Brendon Martin	Sr
LB	3	Kieron Pender	Fr
DB	4	Evian Thompson	Jr
DB	5	Brian O'Neal	Fr
LB	7	Justin Moon	Sr
LB	10	Jonathan Fuamatu	Sr
DB	12	Mark Benard	GS
OLB	13	George Fatoke	So
DB	17	Bryan Bege	So
OLB	20	Alan Olague	Sr
DB	21	Quentin Ellis	So
DB	23	Quincy Ellis	Fr
DB	24	Jacori Tarver	Fr
DB	26	Nick Mendoza	Jr
DB	27	Elijah Rolfe	Fr
DB	29	Anthony Miranda Jr.	So
LB	31	Dempsey Spears	So
LB	32	Roscoe Billings	Fr
LB	33	Emmanuel Osom	Fr
LB	39	Joshua Hernandez	Fr
LB	42	Tayvion Hunter	Fr
LB	43	Byron Carter	Fr
DB	45	Shannon Montgomery	Fr
DL	49	Dylan Ivey	So
DL	50	Abel Clark	So
DL	51	Humberto Garcia	Jr
DL	53	Mozion Khayyam	Fr
DL	55	Kevon Billingsly	Fr
DL	56	Jordan Hooks	So
LB	58	Kamerion Nash	Fr
LB	59	Diego Paez	Fr
DL	78	Caden Boston	Fr
DL	84	Jaden Cerna	Fr
DL	87	George Lane	Fr
DL	90	Jayden Zurba	Fr
DE	94	Tim Galloway	So
DL	95	Samuel Hernandez Jr.	So
DL	96	Joseph Hampton	Fr
DL	99	Jacob Johnson	Jr
DB		Braylin Caldwell	So
DB		Quinn Carroll	Fr
DB		Jacob Dillard	Fr
LB, DE		Micah Leejay	Jr
LB		Malik Sims	Fr
DB		Jaden Valdes	Fr

Special teams

Pos.	#	Name	Class
P	16	Gunner Hammond	Sr
LS	46	Ebenezer Malone	So
K	47	Vicente Gariveay	Fr
P	48	Jacob Franco	So
K, P	53	Jason Maltos	Fr
P		Chris Ruiz	Jr

Head coach

- Lee Hays

Coordinators/assistant coaches

- Cadron Davis
  Assistant head coach/Defensive coordinator
- Billy Jack Ray
  Running backs
- Eric Daniels
  Linebackers
- Andy Rivera
  Offensive line
- Javeon Moses
  Outside linebackers
- Quincy Blair
  Secondary
- Joaquin Sandoval
  Assistant quarterbacks
- Xavier Garcia
  Tight ends/Fullbacks
- Sam Fehoko
  Defensive line
- Jawaine Massenburg
  Wide receivers
- Tony Garcia
  Inside receivers

Legend

- (C) Team captain
- (S) Suspended
- (I) Ineligible
- Injured
- Redshirt

Roster
Last update: November 17, 2025
