= 2025 Central Washington Wildcats football team =

American college football season

2025 Central Washington Wildcats football

LSC champion

NCAA Division II First Round, L 20–27 vs. Western Colorado
- Conference: Lone Star Conference

Ranking
- AFCA: No. 13
- Record: 10–2 (9–0 LSC)
- Head coach: Chris Fisk (7th season)
- Offensive coordinator: Mike Ferriter (4th season)
- Offensive scheme: Spread option
- Defensive coordinator: Grant Torgerson (3rd season)
- Base defense: Multiple 3–4
- Home stadium: Tomlinson Stadium

2025 Lone Star Conference football standings
	Conf.			Overall
Team	W		L	W		L
No. 13 Central Washington $^	9	–	0	10	–	2
No. 5 UT Permian Basin ^	7	–	2	11	–	3
Western Oregon	7	–	2	8	–	3
West Texas A&M #	7	–	2	8	–	4
Angelo State	4	–	5	6	–	5
Texas A&M–Kingsville	4	–	5	5	–	6
Eastern New Mexico	3	–	6	3	–	8
Midwestern State	3	–	6	3	–	8
Western New Mexico	1	–	8	2	–	9
Sul Ross *	0	–	9	0	–	11
$ – Conference champion; ^ – NCAA Division II playoff participant; # – Heritage Bowl participant * – Ineligible for postseason play due to transition from NCAA Division III; Rankings from AFCA poll

The 2025 Central Washington Wildcats football team represented Central Washington University in the 2025 NCAA Division II football season as a member of the Lone Star Conference (LSC); this was the Wildcats' fourth season as a football-only member of the LSC. The team was led by seventh-year head coach Chris Fisk and played home games at Tomlinson Stadium in Ellensburg, Washington.

With a week 10 win over Sul Ross, the Wildcats won at least a share of the LSC title. With a win over Western Oregon in the final week of the regular season, Central Washington claimed the conference title outright.

== Schedule ==
Date	Time	Opponent	Rank	Site	Result	Attendance
August 28	1:00 p.m.	Colorado Mesa*	No. 21	Tomlinson Stadium; Ellensburg, WA	W 41–14	4,377
September 6	5:00 p.m.	at No. 6 (FCS) Montana*	No. 18	Washington–Grizzly Stadium; Missoula, MT	L 17–42	26,309
September 20	6:00 p.m.	West Texas A&M	No. 17	Tomlinson Stadium; Ellensburg, WA	W 52–6	5,001
September 27	5:00 p.m.	at Western New Mexico	No. 17	Altamirano Stadium; Silver City, NM	W 91–31	432
October 4	6:00 p.m.	Eastern New Mexico	No. 16	Tomlinson Stadium; Ellensburg, WA	W 58–7	5,219
October 11	6:00 p.m.	at No. 6 UT Permian Basin	No. 13	Ratliff Stadium; Odessa, TX	W 27–14	2,574
October 18	6:00 p.m.	Texas A&M–Kingsville^{†}	No. 11	Tomlinson Stadium; Ellensburg, WA	W 24–21	5,122
October 25	5:00 p.m.	at Midwestern State	No. 8	Memorial Stadium; Wichita Falls, TX	W 56–13	3,012
November 1	6:00 p.m.	No. 16 Angelo State	No. 8	Tomlinson Stadium; Ellensburg, WA	W 38–21	5,265
November 8	5:00 p.m.	at Sul Ross	No. 7	Jackson Field; Alpine, TX	W 73–7	400
November 15	1:05 p.m.	at No. 24 Western Oregon	No. 6	McArthur Field; Monmouth, OR	W 19–17	2,127
November 22	1:00 p.m.	No. 15 Western Colorado*	No. 5	Tomlinson Stadium; Ellensburg, WA (NCAA Division II First Round)	L 20–27	1,598
*Non-conference game; ^{†}Homecoming; Rankings from AFCA Poll released prior to the game; All times are in Pacific time

== Rankings ==
Ranking movements Legend: ██ Increase in ranking ██ Decrease in ranking — = Not ranked т = Tied with team above or below
	Week													
Poll	Pre	1	2	3	4	5	6	7	8	9	10	11	12	Final
AFCA	21	18	18т	17	17	16	13	11	8	8	7	6	5	13
D2 Football	—	23	21	19	18	17	15	7	7	7	6	6	5	13

== LSC preseason media poll ==
The Lone Star Conference released its preseason prediction poll on July 24, 2025. The Wildcats were predicted to finish second in the conference, behind only Angelo State, and also received four first-place votes.

== Game summaries ==
=== Colorado Mesa ===
Colorado Mesa Mavericks at No. 21 Central Washington Wildcats – Game summary

Quarter	1	2	3	4	Total
Mavericks	0	0	7	7	14
No. 21 Wildcats	7	0	20	14	41

at Tomlinson Stadium, Ellensburg, Washington

- Date: August 28
- Game time: 1:00 p.m. PDT
- Game weather: Sunny, 83 °F (28 °C)
- Game attendance: 4,377
- Referee: Seth Nielson
- Box score, Recap

Game information
First quarter
- CWU – Jalen Grable 51-yard pass from Kennedy McGill (David Weber kick), 7:10. Wildcats 7–0. Drive: 4 plays, 72 yards, 2:11.

Second quarter

- No scoring plays

Third quarter

- CWU – Kennedy McGill 14-yard run (David Weber kick), 12:37. Wildcats 14–0. Drive: 6 plays, 75 yards, 2:23.
- CMU – Alex Turpin 6-yard pass from Liu Aumavae (Sullivan Moon kick), 9:09. Wildcats 14–7. Drive: 7 plays, 75 yards, 3:28.
- CWU – Mason Juergens 55-yard pass from Kennedy McGill (David Weber kick), 7:15. Wildcats 21–7. Drive: 4 plays, 74 yards, 1:47.
- CWU – Brett McCalla 18-yard interception return (kick blocked), 6:22. Wildcats 27–7.

Fourth quarter

- CWU – Kennedy McGill 23-yard run (David Weber kick), 14:54. Wildcats 34–7. Drive: 10 plays, 80 yards, 5:18.
- CMU – Trek Keyworth 66-yard pass from Cole Hansen (Sullivan Moon kick), 13:30. Wildcats 34–14. Drive: 3 plays, 65 yards, 1:24.
- CWU – Ryder Bumgarner 9-yard run (David Weber kick), 10:18. Wildcats 41–14. Drive: 5 plays, 71 yards, 3:05.

Statistics	CMU	CWU
First downs	14	22
Total yards	303	516
Rushing yards	46	292
Passing yards	257	224
Turnovers	1	1
Time of possession	31:25	28:35

Team	Category	Player	Statistics
Colorado Mesa	Passing	Liu Aumavae	18/27, 192 yards, TD, INT
Colorado Mesa	Rushing	Aiden Taylor	14 rushes, 26 yards
Colorado Mesa	Receiving	Trek Keyworth	4 receptions, 147 yards, TD
Central Washington	Passing	Kennedy McGill	8/13, 190 yards, 2 TD, INT
Central Washington	Rushing	Kennedy McGill	13 rushes, 135 yards, 2 TD
Central Washington	Receiving	Mason Juergens	2 receptions, 75 yards, TD

=== At No. 6 (FCS) Montana ===
No. 18 Central Washington Wildcats (1–0) at No. 6 (FCS) Montana Grizzlies (0–0) – Game summary

Quarter	1	2	3	4	Total
No. 18 Wildcats	3	14	0	0	17
No. 6 (FCS) Grizzlies	14	7	14	7	42

at Washington–Grizzly Stadium, Missoula, Montana

- Date: September 6
- Game time: 5:00 p.m. PDT / 6:00 p.m. MDT
- Game weather: Sunny, 84 °F (29 °C)
- Game attendance: 26,309
- Referee: Rob Quello
- TV: ESPN+
- Box score, Recap

Game information

First quarter

- MONT – Eli Gillman 54-yard run (Ty Morrison kick), 13:50. Grizzlies 7–0. Drive: 3 plays, 75 yards, 1:05.
- CWU – David Weber 44-yard field goal, 6:18. Grizzlies 7–3. Drive: 5 plays, 28 yards, 2:48.
- MONT – Stevie Rocker Jr. 5-yard run (Ty Morrison kick), 1:21. Grizzlies 14–3. Drive: 11 plays, 85 yards, 4:51.

Second quarter

- CWU – Camden Loidhamer 15-yard pass from Kennedy McGill (David Weber kick), 3:54. Grizzlies 14–10. Drive: 8 plays, 75 yards, 3:55.
- CWU – Beau Phillips 31-yard run (David Weber kick), 3:54. Wildcats 17–14. Drive: 9 plays, 80 yards, 5:28.
- MONT – Drew Deck 50-yard pass from Keali'i Ah Yat (Ty Morrison kick), 2:29. Grizzlies 21–17. Drive: 4 plays, 75 yards, 1:25.

Third quarter

- MONT – Michael Wortham 76-yard pass from Kealiʻi Ah Yat (Ty Morrison kick), 8:25. Grizzlies 28–17. Drive: 2 plays, 80 yards, 0:44.
- MONT – Eli Gillman 11-yard run (Ty Morrison kick), 2:57. Grizzlies 35–17. Drive: 9 plays, 80 yards, 3:49.

Fourth quarter

- MONT – Eli Gillman 1-yard run (Ty Morrison kick), 7:53. Grizzlies 42–17. Drive: 5 plays, 65 yards, 2:26.

Statistics	CWU	MONT
First downs	21	20
Plays–yards	64–329	60–567
Rushes–yards	44–221	35–310
Passing yards	108	257
Passing: Comp–Att–Int	9–20–2	15–25–2
Turnovers	2	3
Time of possession	36:08	23:51

Team	Category	Player	Statistics
Central Washington	Passing	Kennedy McGill	7/16, 76 yards, TD, 2 INT
Central Washington	Rushing	Beau Phillips	11 carries, 69 yards, TD
Central Washington	Receiving	Jalen Grable	3 receptions, 43 yards
Montana	Passing	Kealiʻi Ah Yat	14/24, 250 yards, 2 TD, 2 INT
Montana	Rushing	Eli Gillman	15 carries, 198 yards, 3 TD
Montana	Receiving	Michael Wortham	6 receptions, 120 yards, TD

After a slow first quarter, the Wildcats jumped out to a 17–14 lead late in the second quarter. However, the Grizzlies would retake the lead just over a minute later and outscored Central Washington 28–0 to win 42–17. The Wildcats' offense was shutout in the second half while the defense failed to force a punt.

=== West Texas A&M ===
West Texas A&M Buffaloes at No. 17 Central Washington Wildcats – Game summary

Quarter	1	2	3	4	Total
Buffaloes	0	6	0	0	6
No. 17 Wildcats	21	14	14	3	52

at Tomlinson Stadium, Ellensburg, Washington

- Date: September 20
- Game time: 6:00 p.m. PDT
- Game weather: Sunny, 77 °F (25 °C)
- Game attendance: 5,001
- Referee: Jerry Springer
- Box score, Recap

Game information
First quarter
- CWU – Kennedy McGill 7-yard run (David Weber kick), 14:15. Wildcats 7–0. Drive: 1 play, 7 yards, 0:07.
- CWU – Justice Taylor 3-yard run (David Weber kick), 10:59. Wildcats 14–0. Drive: 3 plays, 58 yards, 1:23.
- CWU – Mason Juergens 78-yard pass from Kennedy McGill (David Weber kick), 7:15. Wildcats 21–0. Drive: 2 plays, 80 yards, 0:51.

Second quarter

- CWU – Justice Taylor 31-yard run (David Weber kick), 10:40. Wildcats 28–0. Drive: 9 plays, 59 yards, 4:14.
- WT – C'ing Blanton 7-yard pass from R. J. Martinez (kick blocked), 7:25. Wildcats 28–6. Drive: 6 plays, 49 yards, 3:15.
- CWU – Samaje Featherstone 19-yard pass from Kennedy McGill (David Weber kick), 1:24. Wildcats 35–6. Drive: 8 plays, 77 yards, 1:40.

Third quarter

- CWU – Logan Brady 9-yard pass from Kennedy McGill (David Weber kick), 11:02. Wildcats 42–6. Drive: 7 plays, 75 yards, 3:58.
- CWU – Andrew Molly 3-yard pass from Kennedy McGill (David Weber kick), 4:15. Wildcats 49–6. Drive: 12 plays, 61 yards, 6:06.

Fourth quarter

- CWU – David Weber 35-yard field goal, 1:01. Wildcats 52–6. Drive: 10 plays, 33 yards, 3:48.

Statistics	WT	CWU
First downs	17	27
Total yards	232	528
Rushing yards	-60	311
Passing yards	292	217
Turnovers	3	1
Time of possession	27:32	32:28

Team	Category	Player	Statistics
West Texas A&M	Passing	R. J. Martinez	19/42, 292 yards, TD, 2 INT
West Texas A&M	Rushing	Jayden Hibbler	1 rush, 6 yards
West Texas A&M	Receiving	Zach Phipps	3 receptions, 99 yards
Central Washington	Passing	Kennedy McGill	10/16, 217 yards, 4 TD
Central Washington	Rushing	Kennedy McGill	12 rushes, 62 yards, TD
Central Washington	Receiving	Mason Juergens	1 reception, 78 yards, TD

=== At Western New Mexico ===
No. 17 Central Washington Wildcats at Western New Mexico Mustangs – Game summary

Quarter	1	2	3	4	Total
No. 17 Wildcats	35	28	14	14	91
Mustangs	0	17	14	0	31

at Altamirano Stadium, Silver City, New Mexico

- Date: September 27
- Game time: 5:00 p.m. PDT / 6:00 p.m. MDT
- Game weather: Rain, 63 °F (17 °C)
- Game attendance: 432
- Referee: Daniel Mena
- Box score, Recap

Game information
First quarter
- CWU – Justice Taylor 30-yard run (David Weber kick), 12:08. Wildcats 7–0. Drive: 4 plays, 50 yards, 1:29.
- CWU – Beau Phillips 53-yard pass from Kennedy McGill (David Weber kick), 10:30. Wildcats 14–0. Drive: 1 play, 53 yards, 0:13.
- CWU – Justice Taylor 40-yard run (David Weber kick), 8:44. Wildcats 21–0. Drive: 1 play, 40 yards, 0:09.
- CWU – Ryder Bumgarner 2-yard run (David Weber kick), 5:38. Wildcats 28–0. Drive: 4 plays, 66 yards, 1:27.
- CWU – Mason Juergens 15-yard pass from Kennedy McGill (David Weber kick), 1:06. Wildcats 35–0. Drive: 4 plays, 44 yards, 2:04.

Second quarter

- CWU – Kennedy McGill 1-yard run (David Weber kick), 14:02. Wildcats 42–0. Drive: 2 plays, 5 yards, 0:44.
- WNMU – Talan Tinsley 23-yard field goal, 11:07. Wildcats 42–3. Drive: 9 plays, 62 yards, 2:55.
- CWU – Beau Phillips 94-yard kickoff return (David Weber kick), 10:51. Wildcats 49–3.
- WNMU – Deuce Zimmerman 9-yard pass from Connor Ackerley (Talan Tinsley kick), 9:29. Wildcats 49–10. Drive: 3 plays, 75 yards, 1:22.
- CWU – Beau Phillips 100-yard kickoff return (David Weber kick), 9:08. Wildcats 56–10.
- WNMU – Deuce Zimmerman 10-yard pass from Connor Ackerley (Talan Tinsley kick), 3:42. Wildcats 56–17. Drive: 13 plays, 75 yards, 5:26.
- CWU – Justice Taylor 3-yard run (David Weber kick), 0:40. Wildcats 63–17. Drive: 8 plays, 61 yards, 2:53.

Third quarter

- CWU – Mason Juergens 50-yard pass from Caleb Christensen (David Weber kick), 12:08. Wildcats 70–17. Drive: 5 plays, 75 yards, 2:50.
- CWU – Trishion Sullivan 25-yard interception return (David Weber kick), 11:54. Wildcats 77–17.
- WNMU – Deuce Zimmerman 24-yard pass from Connor Ackerley (Talan Tinsley kick), 7:07. Wildcats 77–24. Drive: 11 plays, 72 yards, 4:40.
- WNMU – Davey Morales 24-yard pass from Connor Ackerley (Talan Tinsley kick), 2:38. Wildcats 77–31. Drive: 6 plays, 45 yards, 2:06.

Fourth quarter

- CWU – Caleb Christensen 1-yard run (David Weber kick), 14:55. Wildcats 84–31. Drive: 6 plays, 47 yards, 2:33.
- CWU – Bo Gionet 1-yard run (David Weber kick), 3:10. Wildcats 91–31. Drive: 10 plays, 55 yards, 6:42.

Statistics	CWU	WNMU
First downs	20	24
Total yards	499	468
Rushing yards	334	38
Passing yards	165	430
Turnovers	0	3
Time of possession	27:28	32:32

Team	Category	Player	Statistics
Central Washington	Passing	Kennedy McGill	3/5, 84 yards, 2 TD
Central Washington	Rushing	Justice Taylor	17 rushes, 169 yards, 3 TD
Central Washington	Receiving	Mason Juergens	2 receptions, 65 yards, 2 TD
Western New Mexico	Passing	Connor Ackerley	29/51, 378 yards, 4 TD, 3 INT
Western New Mexico	Rushing	Zay Savoie	6 rushes, 17 yards
Western New Mexico	Receiving	Davey Morales	12 receptions, 143 yards, TD

=== Eastern New Mexico ===
Eastern New Mexico Greyhounds at No. 16 Central Washington Wildcats – Game summary

Quarter	1	2	3	4	Total
Greyhounds	0	0	0	7	7
No. 16 Wildcats	21	31	3	3	58

at Tomlinson Stadium, Ellensburg, Washington

- Date: October 4
- Game time: 6:00 p.m. PDT
- Game weather: Sunny, 60 °F (16 °C)
- Game attendance: 5,219
- Referee: Tracy Hernandez
- Box score, Recap

Game information
First quarter
- CWU – Jalen Gtable 55-yard pass from Kennedy McGill (David Weber kick), 13:18. Wildcats 7–0. Drive: 1 play, 55 yards, 0:11.
- CWU – Kennedy McGill 5-yard run (David Weber kick), 5:33. Wildcats 14–0. Drive: 10 plays, 50 yards, 5:00.
- CWU – Beau Phillips 1-yard run (David Weber kick), 0:39. Wildcats 21–0. Drive: 6 plays, 30 yards, 2:48.

Second quarter

- CWU – Kennedy McGill 50-yard run (David Weber kick), 13:25. Wildcats 28–0. Drive: 2 plays, 75 yards, 0:51.
- CWU – Ryder Bumgarner 3-yard run (David Weber kick), 11:03. Wildcats 35–0. Drive: 3 plays, 42 yards, 0:24.
- CWU – David Weber 46-yard field goal, 8:09. Wildcats 38–0. Drive: 4 plays, 0 yards, 0:48.
- CWU – Jalen Webber 21-yard interception return (David Weber kick), 1:43. Wildcats 45–0.
- CWU – Mason Juergens 25-yard pass from Kennedy McGill (David Weber kick), 0:49. Wildcats 52–0. Drive: 1 play, 25 yards, 0:08.

Third quarter

- CWU – David Weber 49-yard field goal, 9:52. Wildcats 55–0. Drive: 8 plays, 32 yards, 5:01.

Fourth quarter

- CWU – David Weber 23-yard field goal, 4:18. Wildcats 58–0. Drive: 7 plays, 43 yards, 4:18.
- ENMU – Jarius Stewart 1-yard run (Clayton Vincent kick), 0:31. Wildcats 58–7. Drive: 11 plays, 75 yards, 3:47.

Statistics	ENMU	CWU
First downs	11	17
Total yards	198	371
Rushing yards	189	227
Passing yards	9	144
Turnovers	3	1
Time of possession	34:00	26:00

Team	Category	Player	Statistics
Eastern New Mexico	Passing	Chad Ragle	2/7, 10 yards, 2 INT
Eastern New Mexico	Rushing	Jarius Stewart	14 rushes, 67 yards, TD
Eastern New Mexico	Receiving	Jonathon Carter	1 reception, 6 yards
Central Washington	Passing	Kennedy McGill	6/13, 132 yards, 2 TD
Central Washington	Rushing	Kennedy McGill	6 rushes, 67 yards, 2 TD
Central Washington	Receiving	Jalen Grable	1 reception, 55 yards, TD

=== At No. 6 UT Permian Basin ===
No. 13 Central Washington Wildcats at No. 6 UT Permian Basin Falcons – Game summary

Quarter	1	2	3	4	Total
No. 13 Wildcats	0	3	7	17	27
No. 6 Falcons	7	0	7	0	14

at Ratliff Stadium, Odessa, Texas

- Date: October 11
- Game time: 4:00 p.m. PDT / 6:00 p.m. CDT
- Game weather: Sunny
- Game attendance: 2,574
- Referee: Xavier Velazquez
- Box score, Recap

Game information
First quarter
- UTPB – T. J. McKenzie 8-yard pass from Kanon Gibson (Angel Diaz kick), 10:57. Falcons 7–0. Drive: 12 plays, 75 yards, 4:03.

Second quarter

- CWU – David Weber 40-yard field goal, 0:27. Falcons 7–3. Drive: 6 plays, 48 yards, 1:15.

Third quarter

- CWU – Justice Taylor 24-yard run (David Weber kick), 1:22. Wildcats 10–7. Drive: 12 plays, 63 yards, 6:36.
- UTPB – Ben Patterson 73-yard pass from Kanon Gibson (Angel Diaz kick), 0:31. Falcons 14–10. Drive: 2 plays, 75 yards, 0:51.

Fourth quarter

- CWU – Kennedy McGill 6-yard run (David Weber kick), 3:15. Wildcats 17–14. Drive: 10 plays, 56 yards, 6:14.
- CWU – David Weber 44-yard field goal, 0:44. Wildcats 20–14. Drive: 4 plays, 6 yards, 1:01.
- CWU – Javonte Walker 35-yard interception return (David Weber kick), 0:18. Wildcats 27–14.

Statistics	CWU	UTPB
First downs	17	14
Total yards	308	300
Rushing yards	238	50
Passing yards	70	250
Turnovers	1	1
Time of possession	38:15	21:45

Team	Category	Player	Statistics
Central Washington	Passing	Kennedy McGill	7/18, 70 yards
Central Washington	Rushing	Justice Taylor	20 rushes, 100 yards, TD
Central Washington	Receiving	Mason Juergens	3 receptions, 29 yards
UT Permian Basin	Passing	Kanon Gibson	16/39, 250 yards, 2 TD, INT
UT Permian Basin	Rushing	Kory Harris	5 rushes, 24 yards
UT Permian Basin	Receiving	Ben Patterson	1 reception, 73 yards, TD

=== Texas A&M–Kingsville ===
Texas A&M–Kingsville Javelinas at No. 11 Central Washington Wildcats – Game summary

Quarter	1	2	3	4	Total
Javelinas	7	0	7	7	21
No. 11 Wildcats	7	0	10	7	24

at Tomlinson Stadium, Ellensburg, Washington

- Date: October 18
- Game time: 6:00 p.m. PDT
- Game weather: Cloudy, 53 °F (12 °C)
- Game attendance: 5,122
- Referee: Michael Frain
- Box score, Recap

Game information
First quarter
- CWU – Jalen Grable 27-yard run (David Weber kick), 9:01. Wildcats 7–0. Drive: 8 plays, 72 yards, 4:48.
- AMK – King Phillips 25-yard pass from Jack Turner (Angel Lopez kick), 7:08. Tied 7–7. Drive: 6 plays, 75 yards, 1:53.

Second quarter

- No scoring plays

Third quarter

- CWU – David Weber 39-yard field goal, 13:09. Wildcats 10–7. Drive: 4 plays, 3 yards, 1:37.
- AMK – Edward Chumley 1-yard run (Angel Lopez kick), 11:11. Javelinas 14–10. Drive: 6 plays, 87 yards, 1:50.
- CWU – Andrew Molloy 2-yard pass from Kennedy McGill (David Weber kick), 3:38. Wildcats 17–14. Drive: 13 plays, 69 yards, 7:31.

Fourth quarter

- CWU – Kennedy McGill 18-yard run (David Weber kick), 11:56. Wildcats 24–14. Drive: 9 plays, 66 yards, 5:34.
- AMK – King Phillips 5-yard pass from Jack Turner (Angel Lopez kick), 9:09. Wildcats 24–21. Drive: 10 plays, 68 yards, 2:40.

Statistics	AMK	CWU
First downs	19	23
Total yards	350	380
Rushing yards	50	274
Passing yards	300	106
Turnovers	1	0
Time of possession	18:07	41:53

Team	Category	Player	Statistics
Texas A&M–Kingsville	Passing	Jack Turner	22/45, 300 yards, 2 TD, INT
Texas A&M–Kingsville	Rushing	Edward Chumley	11 rushes, 62 yards, TD
Texas A&M–Kingsville	Receiving	King Phillips	9 receptions, 119 yards, 2 TD
Central Washington	Passing	Kennedy McGill	11/19, 106 yards, TD
Central Washington	Rushing	Kennedy McGill	16 rushes, 107 yards, TD
Central Washington	Receiving	Jalen Grable	5 receptions, 52 yards

=== At Midwestern State ===
No. 8 Central Washington Wildcats at Midwestern State Mustangs – Game summary

Quarter	1	2	3	4	Total
No. 8 Wildcats	7	35	7	7	56
Mustangs	7	6	0	0	13

at Memorial Stadium, Wichita Falls, Texas

- Date: October 25
- Game time: 5:00 p.m. PDT / 7:00 p.m. CDT
- Game weather: Clear, 70 °F (21 °C)
- Game attendance: 3,012
- Referee: James Minor
- Box score, Recap

Game information
First quarter
- CWU – Ryder Bumgarner 22-yard pass from Kennedy McGill (David Weber kick), 8:14. Wildcats 7–0. Drive: 5 plays, 53 yards, 2:39.
- MSU – Demonte Green 9-yard pass from Jakolby Longino (Kohen Maroney kick), 3:44. Tied 7–7. Drive: 2 plays, 99 yards, 0:26.

Second quarter

- CWU – Andrew Molloy 17-yard pass from Kennedy McGill (David Weber kick), 14:25. Wildcats 14–7. Drive: 8 plays, 65 yards, 4:19.
- MSU – Kohen Maroney 31-yard field goal, 11:26. Wildcats 14–10. Drive: 10 plays, 53 yards, 2:51.
- CWU – Kennedy McGill 58-yard run (David Weber kick), 9:52. Wildcats 21–10. Drive: 3 plays, 75 yards, 1:34.
- CWU – Brett McCalla 90-yard interception return (David Weber kick), 6:07. Wildcats 28–10.
- CWU – Kennedy McGill 37-yard run (David Weber kick), 1:50. Wildcats 35–10. Drive: 6 plays, 70 yards, 2:22.
- MSU – Kohen Maroney 50-yard field goal, 0:18. Wildcats 35–13. Drive: 8 plays, 52 yards, 1:26.
- CWU – Samaje Featherstone 85-yard kickoff return (David Weber kick), 0:07. Wildcats 42–13.

Third quarter

- CWU – Ryder Bumgarner 24-yard run (David Weber kick), 12:42. Wildcats 49–13. Drive: 4 plays, 73 yards, 2:18.

Fourth quarter

- CWU – Ki'Maree Washington 25-yard run (David Weber kick), 14:07. Wildcats 56–13. Drive: 5 plays, 40 yards, 2:35.

Statistics	CWU	MSU
First downs	22	17
Total yards	488	367
Rushing yards	390	133
Passing yards	98	234
Turnovers	0	1
Time of possession	35:00	25:00

Team	Category	Player	Statistics
Central Washington	Passing	Kennedy McGill	7/9, 98 yards, 2 TD
Central Washington	Rushing	Kennedy McGill	18 rushes, 174 yards, 2 TD
Central Washington	Receiving	Ryder Bumgarner	3 receptions, 39 yards, TD
Midwestern State	Passing	Jakolby Longino	11/24, 236 yards, TD, INT
Midwestern State	Rushing	Jaden Coulter	13 rushes, 79 yards
Midwestern State	Receiving	Jaden Coulter	3 receptions, 122 yards

=== No. 16 Angelo State ===
No. 16 Angelo State Rams at No. 8 Central Washington Wildcats – Game summary

Quarter	1	2	3	4	Total
No. 16 Rams	0	7	14	0	21
No. 8 Wildcats	14	14	7	3	38

at Tomlinson Stadium, Ellensburg, Washington

- Date: November 1
- Game time: 6:00 p.m. PDT
- Game weather: Cloudy, 49 °F (9 °C)
- Game attendance: 5,265
- Referee: Daniel Mena
- Box score, Recap

Game information
First quarter
- CWU – Kennedy McGill 4-yard run (David Weber kick), 7:25. Wildcats 7–0. Drive: 11 plays, 56 yards, 5:41.
- CWU – Kennedy McGill 2-yard run (David Weber kick), 1:15. Wildcats 14–0. Drive: 9 plays, 66 yards, 4:40.

Second quarter

- CWU – Kennedy McGill 2-yard run (David Weber kick), 5:33. Wildcats 21–0. Drive: 4 plays, 24 yards, 2:45.
- ASU – Jayden Jones 15-yard pass from Braeden Fuller (Rance Purser kick), 2:06. Wildcats 21–7. Drive: 9 plays, 82 yards, 3:22.
- CWU – Jalen Grable 18-yard pass from Kennedy McGill (David Weber kick), 0:06. Wildcats 28–7. Drive: 2 plays, 37 yards, 0:24.

Third quarter

- ASU – Zeek Freeman 33-yard pass from Braeden Fuller (Rance Purser kick), 10:24. Wildcats 28–14. Drive: 6 plays, 65 yards, 2:21.
- ASU – Donny Bishop 12-yard pass from Braeden Fuller (Rance Purser kick), 7:58. Wildcats 28–21. Drive: 5 plays, 50 yards, 1:09.
- CWU – Kennedy McGill 4-yard run (David Weber kick), 4:53. Wildcats 35–21. Drive: 2 plays, 25 yards, 0:56.

Fourth quarter

- CWU – David Weber 31-yard field goal, 12:35. Wildcats 38–21. Drive: 4 plays, 2 yards, 2:09.

Statistics	ASU	CWU
First downs	14	18
Total yards	272	329
Rushing yards	79	215
Passing yards	193	114
Turnovers	2	1
Time of possession	24:34	35:26

Team	Category	Player	Statistics
Angelo State	Passing	Braeden Fuller	13/25, 186 yards, 3 TD
Angelo State	Rushing	Jayden Jones	6 rushes, 23 yards
Angelo State	Receiving	Zeek Freeman	2 receptions, 52 yards, TD
Central Washington	Passing	Kennedy McGill	11/19, 114 yards, TD
Central Washington	Rushing	Kennedy McGill	19 rushes, 109 yards, 4 TD
Central Washington	Receiving	Jalen Grable	5 receptions, 64 yards, TD

=== At Sul Ross ===
No. 7 Central Washington Wildcats at Sul Ross Lobos – Game summary

Quarter	1	2	3	4	Total
No. 7 Wildcats	14	21	17	21	73
Lobos	0	7	0	0	7

at Jackson Field, Alpine, Texas

- Date: November 8
- Game time: 5:00 p.m. PST / 7:00 p.m. CST
- Game weather: Sunny
- Game attendance: 400
- Referee: Neil Dilts
- Box score, Recap

Game information
First quarter
- CWU – Justice Taylor 44-yard run (David Weber kick), 13:40. Wildcats 7–0. Drive: 3 plays, 53 yards, 1:20.
- CWU – Kennedy McGill 9-yard run (David Weber kick), 0:00. Wildcats 14–0. Drive: 10 plays, 55 yards, 5:40.

Second quarter

- CWU – Justice Taylor 10-yard run (David Weber kick), 11:59. Wildcats 21–0. Drive: 4 plays, 64 yards, 1:39.
- CWU – Kennedy McGill 15-yard run (David Weber kick), 4:35. Wildcats 28–0. Drive: 11 plays, 73 yards, 5:41.
- CWU – Justice Taylor 4-yard pass from Kennedy McGill (David Weber kick), 1:55. Wildcats 35–0. Drive: 5 plays, 30 yards, 2:05.
- SRS – Yamil Oaxaca 64-yard pass from Kye Callicoatte (Vicente Gariveay kick), 1:27. Wildcats 35–7. Drive: 2 plays, 75 yards, 0:28.

Third quarter

- CWU – David Weber 36-yard field goal, 10:27. Wildcats 38–7. Drive: 10 plays, 56 yards, 4:33.
- CWU – Ryder Bumgarner 1-yard run (David Weber kick), 7:22. Wildcats 45–7. Drive: 3 plays, 36 yards, 1:17.
- CWU – Samaje Featherstone 32-yard pass from Caleb Christensen (David Weber kick), 3:42. Wildcats 52–7. Drive: 4 plays, 41 yards, 2:12.

Fourth quarter

- CWU – A. J. Perez 21-yard pass from Caleb Christensen (David Weber kick), 14:51. Wildcats 59–7. Drive: 7 plays, 48 yards, 3:25.
- CWU – Ki'Marree Washington 3-yard run (David Weber kick), 11:01. Wildcats 66–7. Drive: 4 plays, 20 yards, 1:41.
- CWU – Antoine Lee 27-yard run (David Weber kick), 6:21. Wildcats 73–7. Drive: 5 plays, 76 yards, 2:27.

Statistics	CWU	SRS
First downs	28	10
Total yards	591	237
Rushing yards	394	10
Passing yards	197	227
Turnovers	0	3
Time of possession	37:20	22:40

Team	Category	Player	Statistics
Central Washington	Passing	Kennedy McGill	12/20, 135 yards, TD
Central Washington	Rushing	Justice Taylor	19 rushes, 157 yards, 2 TD
Central Washington	Receiving	Samaje Featherstone	4 receptions, 85 yards, TD
Sul Ross	Passing	Kye Callicoatte	14/31, 227 yards, TD, 2 INT
Sul Ross	Rushing	Kendrick Jefferson	6 rushes, 30 yards
Sul Ross	Receiving	Yamil Oaxaca	3 receptions, 106 yards, TD

With the win, the Wildcats improved to 8–0 in LSC play, guaranteeing at least a share of the conference title.

=== At No. 24 Western Oregon ===
No. 6 Central Washington Wildcats at No. 24 Western Oregon Wolves – Game summary

Quarter	1	2	3	4	Total
No. 6 Wildcats	0	0	3	16	19
No. 24 Wolves	0	14	3	0	17

at McArthur Field, Monmouth, Oregon

- Date: November 15
- Game time: 1:05 p.m. PST
- Game weather: Sunny, 62 °F (17 °C)
- Game attendance: 2,127
- Referee: Alan Stone
- Box score, Recap

Game information
First quarter
- No scoring plays

Second quarter

- WOU – Jermaine Land 4-yard run (Zane Colson kick), 11:00. Wolves 7–0. Drive: 5 plays, 61 yards, 2:20.
- WOU – Tyler Konald 1-yard run (Zane Colson kick), 4:00. Wolves 14–0. Drive: 8 plays, 50 yards, 3:56.

Third quarter

- CWU – Wyatt Redding 34-yard field goal, 10:37. Wolves 14–3. Drive: 9 plays, 46 yards, 4:15.
- WOU – Zane Colson 36-yard field goal, 0:36. Wolves 17–3. Drive: 11 plays, 55 yards, 5:38.

Fourth quarter

- CWU – Kennedy McGill 29-yard run (David Weber kick), 14:23. Wolves 17–10. Drive: 3 plays, 56 yards, 1:03.
- CWU – David Weber 33-yard field goal, 6:26. Wolves 17–13. Drive: 13 plays, 47 yards, 7:00.
- CWU – Logan Brady 13-yard pass from Kennedy McGill, 0:00. Wildcats 19–17. Drive: 13 plays, 80 yards, 1:47.

Statistics	CWU	WOU
First downs	24	10
Total yards	302	257
Rushing yards	145	125
Passing yards	157	132
Turnovers	2	1
Time of possession	36:02	23:58

Team	Category	Player	Statistics
Central Washington	Passing	Kennedy McGill	16/37, 157 yards, TD, 2 INT
Central Washington	Rushing	Kennedy McGill	22 rushes, 93 yards, TD
Central Washington	Receiving	Ryder Bumgarner	4 receptions, 52 yards
Western Oregon	Passing	Jordan McCarty	5/15, 132 yards, INT
Western Oregon	Rushing	Jordan McCarty	18 rushes, 64 yards
Western Oregon	Receiving	Cody Hall	2 receptions, 51 yards

=== No. 15 Western Colorado (NCAA Division II First Round) ===
2025 NCAA Division II Playoffs First Round
No. 15 Western Colorado Mountaineers at No. 5 Central Washington Wildcats – Game summary

Quarter	1	2	3	4	Total
No. 15 Mountaineers	0	14	7	6	27
No. 5 Wildcats	3	7	10	0	20

at Tomlinson Stadium, Ellensburg, Wasgington

- Date: November 22
- Game time: 1:00 p.m. PST
- Game weather: Sunny, 46 °F (8 °C)
- Game attendance: 1,598
- Referee: Dwight Neibling
- Box score

Game information
First quarter
- CWU – David Weber 46-yard field goal, 6:25. Wildcats 3–0. Drive: 8 plays, 65 yards, 3:50.

Second quarter

- WCU – Quinn Bailey 53-yard run (Adam Tasei kick), 13:01. Mountaineers 7–3. Drive: 1 play, 53 yards, 0:09.
- WCU – Drew Nash 32-yard run (Adam Tasei kick), 5:20. Mountaineers 14–3. Drive: 7 plays, 69 yards, 4:06.
- CWU – Kuma Scanlan 45-yard interception return (David Weber kick), 0:39. Mountaineers 14–10.

Third quarter

- CWU – Justice Taylor 12-yard run (David Weber kick), 13:17. Wildcats 17–14. Drive: 3 plays, 73 yards, 1:37.
- CWU – David Weber 41-yard field goal, 5:13. Wildcats 20–14. Drive: 8 plays, 55 yards, 4:38.
- WCU – Ramon Ruiz 3-yard pass from Drew Nash (Adam Tasei kick), 0:11. Mountaineers 21–20. Drive: 10 plays, 75 yards, 5:02.

Fourth quarter

- WCU – Joshua Dixon 41-yard pass from Drew Nash (kick blocked), 6:58. Mountaineers 27–20. Drive: 3 plays, 60 yards, 1:34.

Statistics	WCU	CWU
First downs	15	14
Total yards	332	410
Rushing yards	140	152
Passing yards	192	258
Turnovers	1	2
Time of possession	31:10	28:50

Team	Category	Player	Statistics
Western Colorado	Passing	Drew Nash	14/26, 192 yards, 2 TD, INT
Western Colorado	Rushing	Quinn Bailey	12 rushes, 65 yards, TD
Western Colorado	Receiving	Caden Measner	4 receptions, 50 yards
Central Washington	Passing	Kennedy McGill	16/33, 258 yards
Central Washington	Rushing	Kennedy McGill	11 rushes, 59 yards
Central Washington	Receiving	Samaje Featherstone	4 receptions, 81 yards

== Roster ==
2025 Central Washington Wildcats football team roster
Players
Coaches
Offense

Pos.	#	Name	Class
WR	1	Mason Juergens	So
WR	2	Jalen Grable	Sr
WR	4	Cole Hunt	So
RB	5	Justice Taylor	Jr
RB	6	Ryder Bumgarner	So
QB	7	Justin Brennan	Jr
WR	10	Logan Brady	Sr
WR	11	Ty Snider	Jr
RB	14	Beau Phillips	So
QB	16	Caleb Christensen	Jr
QB	17	Kennedy McGill	Jr
WR	18	A. J. Perez	So
WR	19	Samaje Featherstone	Jr
RB	23	Antoine Lee	Fr
WR	24	Gavin Nash	So
RB	27	Ki'Marree Washington	So
RB	38	Blake Borup	So
OL	53	Donovan Scantlebury	Jr
OL	54	Slade Edwards	Sr
OL	57	Jaxin McCallum	Jr
OL	58	Noah Koke-Mauga	Jr
OL	62	Gavin McCallum	Fr
OL	63	Tyler Luzan	Jr
OL	67	Brody Sahlfeld	Fr
OL	70	Jacob Woodcock	Fr
OL	71	Brady Holland	Fr
OL	72	Lucas Johnson	Fr
OL	73	DeQuan Freeland	Fr
OL	74	Connor Aney	Fr
OL	75	Kaleb Potts	Jr
OL	76	Roman Perrin	Jr
OL	77	Charlie Bennett	Fr
OL	78	Vance Gustafson	Fr
OL	79	Dylan Dean	Sr
TE	80	Stephen Woodward	So
TE	81	Camden Loidhamer	Jr
TE	82	Andrew Molloy	Jr
TE	83	Max Moenoa	Sr
WR	84	Ben Hallead	Fr
WR	85	Boggy Brown	Fr
TE	87	Wentworth Scribner	Fr
TE	88	Logan Lipscomb	Fr
WR	89	Adam Loum	Fr
WR		Ryan Atterberry	Jr
WR		Andi Cosme	Fr
QB		Luke Gale	Fr
WR		Maddox Heyliger	Fr
RB		Colton Magruder	Fr
QB		Kolton Matson	Fr
WR		Colton Paulson	Fr

Defense

Pos.	#	Name	Class
DB	0	Jalen Owens	Sr
DB	8	Zay Zennings	Fr
DB	9	Javonte Walker	So
DB	12	Landon Schafer	Fr
DB	13	King Williams	Jr
DB	20	Jaylen Clay	GS
DB	21	Connor Goff	Jr
DB	22	Chris Dodson	Jr
DB	25	Mika Roberson	Fr
DB	26	Wahmi Emmsley	Sr
DB	28	Coen Cronk	Fr
LB	29	Logan Lisherness	So
DB	30	Omar Lazcano	Fr
LB	31	Brycen Indell	Jr
DB	32	Jalen Webber	Sr
LB	33	Jairus Phillips	Jr
DL	34	Brogan De'Asis	Jr
DB	35	Ethan Pletcher	So
DB	36	Michael Westbrook Jr.	So
DB	37	David Jones	Jr
LB	40	Brett McCalla	Jr
LB	41	Treyson Eddleman	Fr
DL	42	Chase Loidhamer	GS
LB	43	Kuma Scanlan	Sr
DB	44	Chase Coalson	Sr
DB	46	Isaiah Cuellar	Fr
DL	48	Tyler King	So
DL	50	Hudson Hardy	Fr
LB	51	Peyton Cunningham	Fr
DL	52	Thijs Van Diepen	Fr
DL	55	Tayvion Smith	Fr
DL	56	Timothy Timoteo	So
DL	59	Riah Tua	Fr
DL	66	Chris Hauss	Fr
DL	90	Matulino Masunu	Sr
DL	92	Ty Evans	So
DL	94	Trishion Sullivan	Jr
DL	96	Brian Kuhn	Fr
DL	97	Mikaio Edward	So
DL	98	Johnny O'Connor	Fr
DL	99	Zeke Stefano	Fr
LB		Cale Allen	Fr
DB		Darius Andaya	Fr
DB		Jaden Chimese	Fr
DB		Bo Dods	So
DB		Braxton Feldmann	Fr
LB		Keaton Fried	Fr
DB		Jaylyn Keller	Fr
DB		Robert Matulich	Sr
DB		Jerimyah Mitchell	Fr
DB		Khris Norris	Fr

Special teams

Pos.	#	Name	Class
P	15	Bo Gionet	Fr
K	45	Wyatt Redding	Jr
LS	47	Bennett Nield	Jr
K	49	David Weber	Jr
LS		Joey Costanti	Fr

Head coach

- Chris Fisk
  Head coach/Tight ends

Coordinators/assistant coaches

- Grant Torgerson
  Associate head coach/Defensive coordinator/Linebackers
- Mike Ferriter
  Offensive coordinator/Quarterbacks
- Jared Gallatin
  Special teams coordinator/Safeties
- Patrick Belony
  Defensive line
- Alex Kastens
  Offensive line
- Brady Crane
  Running backs
- Darren Gaines
  Wide receivers
- Ju'Wan Murphy
  Cornerbacks
- Chase Harrington
  Assistant offensive line
- Ben Wolters
  Assistant defensive line

Legend

- (C) Team captain
- (S) Suspended
- (I) Ineligible
- Injured
- Redshirt

Roster
Last update: November 11, 2025
