= Lee Hays (American football) =

American football coach

Current position
- Title: Head coach
- Team: Sul Ross
- Conference: LSC
- Record: 2–20

Biographical details
- Born: Del Rio, Texas
- Education: Texas A&M University–Kingsville (BS; 1996); West Texas A&M University (MS; 2004)

Playing career
- 1989–1990: Cisco Junior College
- 1991: Abilene Christian
- 1996: Texas A&M–Kingsville
- Positions: Defensive end, linebacker, tight end

Coaching career (HC unless noted)
- 1997–1998: Texas A&M–Kingsville (TE)
- 1999: West Texas A&M (OL)
- 2000: Texas A&M–Kingsville (DL)
- 2001–2002: Texas A&M–Kingsville (OL)
- 2003–2005: West Texas A&M (OC)
- 2006–2007: Baylor (OC)
- 2008–2009: Sam Houston (OL)
- 2010: Houston (OL)
- 2011: Tarleton State (OC)
- 2012: Houston (OL)
- 2013–2017: Texas Tech (OL)
- 2018–2024: Lubbock–Cooper HS (TX) (OL/co-OC)
- 2025–present: Sul Ross

Head coaching record
- Overall: 2–20

Lee Hays is an American football coach who is currently the head coach at Sul Ross State University, a position he has held since the 2025 season.

== Playing career ==
Hays spent two years at Cisco Junior College before transferring to Abilene Christian University for the 1991 season, playing as a defensive end and linebacker at both schools. After a year at Abilene Christian, Hays joined the United States Marine Corps Reserve. Hays returned to college in 1996 at the age of 29 as a walk-on tight end for Texas A&M–Kingsville, where he also received his Bachelor's degree.

== Coaching career ==
=== Sul Ross ===
Hays was announced as the new head coach for the Sul Ross Lobos on February 12, 2025, two months after previous coach Barry Derickson announced he would be stepping down.

In Hays's first season at Sul Ross, the Lobos finished the season going 0–11. This was also the third and final season of a transition period from Division III to Division II for the program. As a provisional Division II member, the Lobos were ineligible for the NCAA Division II playoffs, but were eligible for regular conference awards, the Heritage Bowl, and the regular season conference title.

Hays would get his first win as the Lobos' head coach in the second game of the 2026 season, defeating Adams State 53–26; the win also snapped a 14 game losing streak for the program. Hays would get his first conference win a few weeks later with a 56–43 victory over Eastern New Mexico, with the 56 points being the most the Lobos have scored in a Lone Star Conference game.

== Head coaching record ==
Year	Team	Overall	Conference	Standing	Bowl/playoffs
Sul Ross Lobos (Lone Star Conference) (2025–present)
2025	Sul Ross	0–11	0–9	10th	
2026	Sul Ross	2–9	1–8	9th	
Total:		2–20			
