= Bain–Schaeffer Buffalo Stadium =

American college football stadium in Canyon, Texas

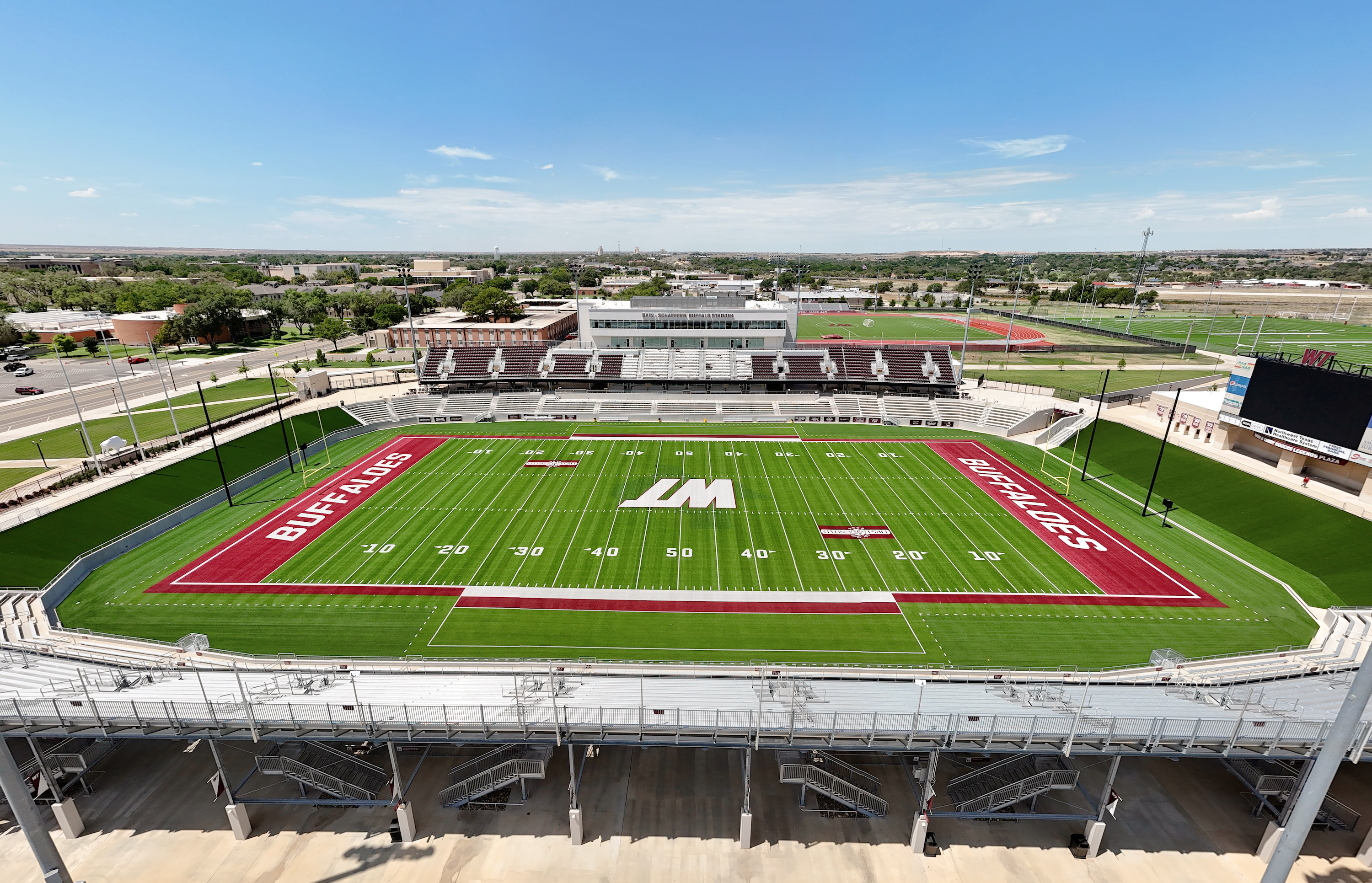
- Interactive map of Bain–Schaeffer Buffalo Stadium
- Former names: Buffalo Stadium (2019–2022)
- Location: 2609 Russell Long Blvd; Canyon, Texas 79015
- Coordinates: 34.9860°N 101.9118°W
- Owner: West Texas A&M University
- Operator: West Texas A&M University
- Capacity: 8,500

Construction
- Opened: September 7, 2019
- Architect: Pfluger Architects
- Structural engineer: LTY Engineers

Tenant
- West Texas A&M Buffaloes (NCAA) (2019–present)

Bain–Schaeffer Buffalo Stadium is an American college football stadium located in Canyon, Texas. Located on the campus of West Texas A&M University, the stadium is the home venue for the West Texas A&M Buffaloes football program. The stadium has a seating capacity of 8,500 and with overflow capacity can go up to 12,000.

== History ==
The stadium opened in 2019 under the name of Buffalo Stadium before being receiving its current name in September 2022. The stadium is named after Barbara and Ray Bain and Geneva and Stanly Schaeffer.

The field at the stadium was named First United Field in 2023 following a naming rights agreement between the university's athletic department and First United Bank that will last until 2033.
