= 2018 Delta State Statesmen football team =

American college football season

2018 Delta State Statesmen football
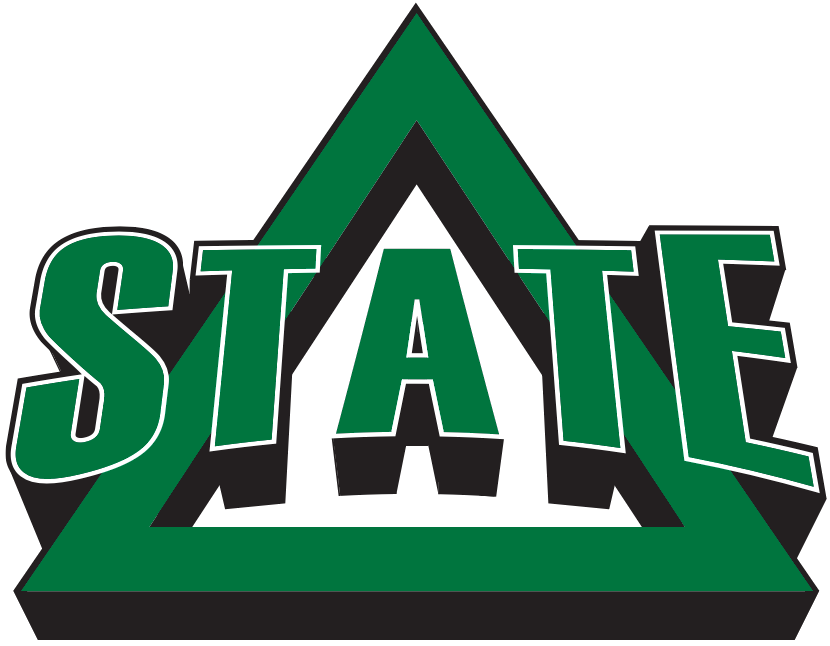
- Conference: Gulf South Conference
- Record: 2-8 (2-6 GSC)
- Head coach: Todd Cooley (6th season)
- Offensive coordinator: Joel Williams (6th season)
- Defensive coordinator: Jerry Partridge (2nd season)
- Home stadium: Parker Field at Horace McCool Stadium

2018 Gulf South Conference football standings
	Conf.			Overall
Team	W		L	W		L
No. 1 Valdosta State $^	8	–	0	14	–	0
No. 16 West Georgia ^	7	–	1	10	–	2
Florida Tech ^	5	–	3	8	–	4
West Alabama ^	5	–	3	8	–	4
West Florida	4	–	4	6	–	5
North Greenville	3	–	4	4	–	6
Delta State	2	–	6	2	–	8
Mississippi College	1	–	6	3	–	7
Shorter	0	–	8	0	–	11
$ – Conference champion; ^ – NCAA Division II playoff participant; Rankings from AFCA Poll

The 2018 Delta State Statesmen football team represented Delta State University in the 2018 NCAA Division II football season. They were led by sixth-year head coach Todd Cooley. The Statesmen played their home games at McCool Stadium and were members of the Gulf South Conference.

== Preseason ==
=== Gulf South Conference coaches poll ===
On August 2, 2018, the Gulf South Conference released their preseason coaches poll with the Statesmen predicted to finish in 4th place in the conference.

Predicted finish	Team	Votes (1st place)
1	West Alabama	62 (6)
2	West Florida	59 (3)
3	West Georgia	44
4	Delta State	41
5	Valdosta State	38
6	Florida Tech	32
7	North Greenville	24
8	Mississippi College	16
9	Shorter	8

=== Preseason All-Gulf South Conference Team ===
The Statesmen had three players at three positions selected to the preseason all-Gulf South Conference team.

Offense

Innis Claud V – OG

Defense

Ovenson Cledanord – LB

Tramond Lofton – DL

== Schedule ==
Delta State 2018 football schedule consists of five home and away games in the regular season. The Statesmen will host GSC foes Mississippi College, North Greenville, Shorter, and West Florida, and will travel to Florida Tech, Valdosta State, West Alabama and West Georgia.

The Statesmen will host one of the two non-conference games against Grand Valley State from the Great Lakes Intercollegiate Athletic Conference and will travel to Tarleton State from the Lone Star Conference.

Three of the ten games will be broadcast on ESPN3, as part of the Gulf South Conference Game of the Week.

Date	Time	Opponent	Site	TV	Result	Attendance
August 30	6:00 p.m.	at Tarleton State*	Memorial Stadium; Stephenville, TX		L 13–44	4,781
September 8	6:00 p.m.	No. 8 Grand Valley State*	McCool Stadium; Cleveland, MS		L 10-21	5,514
September 15	6:00 p.m.	at Florida Tech	Florida Tech Panther Stadium; Melbourne, FL	ESPN3	L 12-30	3,567
September 22	6:00 p.m.	North Greenville	McCool Stadium; Cleveland, MS		L 20-33	6,660
September 29	6:00 p.m.	No. 11 West Florida	McCool Stadium; Cleveland, MS		L 21-30	5,678
October 6	12:00 p.m.	at No. 10 Valdosta State	Bazemore–Hyder Stadium; Valdosta, GA		L 28-59	2,036
October 13	2:00 p.m.	at West Alabama	Tiger Stadium; Livingston, AL	ESPN3	L 14-17	3,872
October 25	6:00 p.m.	Shorter	McCool Stadium; Cleveland, MS	ESPN3	W 46-20	3,333
November 3	2:00 p.m.	at No. 3 West Georgia	University Stadium; Carrollton, GA		L 17-29	3,281
November 10	6:00 p.m.	Mississippi College	McCool Stadium; Cleveland, MS (rivalry)		W 28-21	5,432
*Non-conference game; Rankings from AFCA Poll released prior to the game; All times are in Central time

== Rankings ==
Ranking movements Legend: ██ Increase in ranking ██ Decrease in ranking — = Not ranked RV = Received votes
	Week												
Poll	Pre	1	2	3	4	5	6	7	8	9	10	11	Final
AFCA	RV	RV	—	—	—	—	—	—	—	—	—	—	—

== Game summaries ==
=== At Tarleton State ===
	1	2	3	4	Total
Statesmen	3	3	0	7	13
Texans	6	17	21	0	44

=== Grand Valley State ===
	1	2	3	4	Total
Lakers	0	7	7	7	21
Statesmen	3	0	7	0	10

=== At Florida Tech ===
	1	2	3	4	Total
Statesmen	0	6	6	0	12
Panthers	21	9	0	0	30

=== North Greenville ===
	1	2	3	4	Total
Crusaders	14	3	13	3	33
Statesmen	10	0	3	7	20

=== West Florida ===
	1	2	3	4	Total
Argonauts	3	3	10	14	30
Statesmen	7	14	0	0	21

=== At Valdosta State ===
	1	2	3	4	Total
Statesmen	14	14	0	0	28
Blazers	14	14	17	14	59

=== At West Alabama ===
	1	2	3	4	Total
Statesmen	7	0	7	0	14
Tigers	7	7	0	3	17

=== Shorter ===
	1	2	3	4	Total
Hawks	6	7	0	7	20
Statesmen	14	14	18	0	46

=== At West Georgia ===
	1	2	3	4	Total
Statesmen	7	10	0	0	17
Wolves	3	9	10	7	29

=== Mississippi College ===
	1	2	3	4	Total
Choctaws	0	14	0	7	21
Statesmen	7	7	14	0	28
