= 2018 Mississippi College Choctaws football team =

American college football season

2018 Mississippi College Choctaws football
- Conference: Gulf South Conference
- Record: 3–7 (1–6 GSC)
- Head coach: John Bland (5th season)
- Offensive coordinator: Tommy Laurendine (1st season)
- Defensive coordinator: Michael Collins (3rd season)
- Home stadium: Robinson-Hale Stadium

2018 Gulf South Conference football standings
| | Conf. | | | Overall |
| Team | W | | L | W | | L |
|---|---|---|---|---|---|---|
| No. 1 Valdosta State $^ | 8 | – | 0 | 14 | – | 0 |
| No. 16 West Georgia ^ | 7 | – | 1 | 10 | – | 2 |
| Florida Tech ^ | 5 | – | 3 | 8 | – | 4 |
| West Alabama ^ | 5 | – | 3 | 8 | – | 4 |
| West Florida | 4 | – | 4 | 6 | – | 5 |
| North Greenville | 3 | – | 4 | 4 | – | 6 |
| Delta State | 2 | – | 6 | 2 | – | 8 |
| Mississippi College | 1 | – | 6 | 3 | – | 7 |
| Shorter | 0 | – | 8 | 0 | – | 11 |
$ – Conference champion; ^ – NCAA Division II playoff participant; Rankings from AFCA Poll

The 2018 Mississippi College Choctaws football team represented Mississippi College during the 2018 NCAA Division II football season. They were led by fifth-year head coach John Bland. The Choctaws played their home games at Robinson-Hale Stadium and were members of the Gulf South Conference (GSC).

== Preseason ==
=== Gulf South Conference coaches poll ===
On August 2, 2018, the Gulf South Conference released their preseason coaches poll with the Choctaws predicted to finish eighth place in the conference.

| Predicted finish | Team | Votes (1st place) |
|---|---|---|
| 1 | West Alabama | 62 (6) |
| 2 | West Florida | 59 (3) |
| 3 | West Georgia | 44 |
| 4 | Delta State | 41 |
| 5 | Valdosta State | 38 |
| 6 | Florida Tech | 32 |
| 7 | North Greenville | 24 |
| 8 | Mississippi College | 16 |
| 9 | Shorter | 8 |

=== Preseason All-Gulf South Conference Team ===
The Choctaws had one player at one position selected to the preseason all-Gulf South Conference team.

Special teams Chakel Gates – RS

== Schedule ==
Mississippi College 2018 football schedule consists of six home and five away games in the regular season. The Choctaws will host GSC foes Valdosta State, West Alabama, West Florida, West Georgia, and will travel to Delta State, Florida Tech, North Greenville, and Shorter.

The Choctaws will host two of the three non-conference games against Clark Atlanta from the Southern Intercollegiate Athletic Conference and Southwest Baptist Bearcats football from the Great Lakes Valley Conference, and will travel to North Alabama, which is a FCS Independent team.

Two of the eleven games will be broadcast on ESPN3, as part of the Gulf South Conference Game of the Week.

| Date | Time | Opponent | Site | TV | Result | Attendance |
|---|---|---|---|---|---|---|
| August 30 | 7:00 p.m. | Clark Atlanta* | Robinson-Hale Stadium; Clinton, MS | | W 31–30 | 3,834 |
| September 8 | 6:00 p.m. | Southwest Baptist* | Robinson–Hale Stadium; Clinton, MS | | W 34-9 | 3,572 |
| September 15 | 6:00 p.m. | at North Greenville | Younts Stadium; Tigerville, SC | | Canceled^{[a]} | |
| September 22 | 7:00 p.m. | No. 10 West Florida | Robinson–Hale Stadium; Clinton, MS | ESPN3 | L 21-34 | 3,347 |
| September 29 | 7:00 p.m. | No. 13 Valdosta State | Robinson–Hale Stadium; Clinton, MS | | L 42-63 | 2,654 |
| October 6 | 6:00 p.m. | at Florida Tech | Florida Tech Panther Stadium; Melbourne, FL | | L 24-31 | 2,543 |
| October 13 | 6:00 p.m. | at North Alabama* | Braly Municipal Stadium; Florence, AL | | L 17-34 | 9,230 |
| October 20 | 12:00 p.m. | at Shorter | Barron Stadium; Rome, GA | ESPN3 | W 37-24 | 1,225 |
| October 27 | 3:00 p.m. | No. 3 West Georgia^{†} | Robinson–Hale Stadium; Clinton, MS | | L 21-36 | 6,872 |
| November 3 | 2:00 p.m. | West Alabama | Robinson–Hale Stadium; Clinton, MS | | L 3-24 | 4,347 |
| November 10 | 2:00 p.m. | at Delta State | McCool Stadium; Cleveland, MS (rivalry) | | L 21-28 | 5,432 |
*Non-conference game; ^{†}Homecoming; Rankings from AFCA Poll released prior to the game; All times are in Central time

Schedule source:
^{^[a]}The game between North Greenville and Mississippi College was cancelled in advance of the arrival of Hurricane Florence. The game will not be rescheduled.

=== Rankings ===
Ranking movements Legend: — = Not ranked
| | Week | | | | | | | | | | | | |
| Poll | Pre | 1 | 2 | 3 | 4 | 5 | 6 | 7 | 8 | 9 | 10 | 11 | Final |
|---|---|---|---|---|---|---|---|---|---|---|---|---|---|
| AFCA | — | — | — | — | — | — | — | — | — | — | — | — | — |

== Game summaries ==
=== Clark Atlanta ===
| | 1 | 2 | 3 | 4 | Total |
|---|---|---|---|---|---|
| Panthers | 6 | 14 | 3 | 7 | 30 |
| Choctaws | 14 | 7 | 7 | 3 | 31 |

=== Southwest Baptist ===
| | 1 | 2 | 3 | 4 | Total |
|---|---|---|---|---|---|
| Bearcats | 3 | 0 | 0 | 6 | 9 |
| Choctaws | 7 | 10 | 10 | 7 | 34 |

=== West Florida ===
| | 1 | 2 | 3 | 4 | Total |
|---|---|---|---|---|---|
| Argonauts | 3 | 7 | 14 | 10 | 34 |
| Choctaws | 0 | 0 | 14 | 7 | 21 |

=== Valdosta State ===
| | 1 | 2 | 3 | 4 | Total |
|---|---|---|---|---|---|
| Blazers | 7 | 35 | 14 | 7 | 63 |
| Choctaws | 7 | 14 | 14 | 7 | 42 |

=== At Florida Tech ===
| | 1 | 2 | 3 | 4 | Total |
|---|---|---|---|---|---|
| Choctaws | 0 | 14 | 7 | 3 | 24 |
| Panthers | 3 | 7 | 7 | 14 | 31 |

=== At North Alabama ===
| | 1 | 2 | 3 | 4 | Total |
|---|---|---|---|---|---|
| Choctaws | 7 | 7 | 3 | 0 | 17 |
| Lions | 21 | 10 | 0 | 3 | 34 |

=== At Shorter ===
| | 1 | 2 | 3 | 4 | Total |
|---|---|---|---|---|---|
| Choctaws | 7 | 21 | 3 | 6 | 37 |
| Hawks | 7 | 0 | 7 | 10 | 24 |

=== West Georgia ===
| | 1 | 2 | 3 | 4 | Total |
|---|---|---|---|---|---|
| Wolves | 7 | 10 | 7 | 12 | 36 |
| Choctaws | 0 | 14 | 7 | 0 | 21 |

=== West Alabama ===
| | 1 | 2 | 3 | 4 | Total |
|---|---|---|---|---|---|
| Tigers | 0 | 10 | 7 | 7 | 24 |
| Choctaws | 0 | 3 | 0 | 0 | 3 |

=== At Delta State ===
| | 1 | 2 | 3 | 4 | Total |
|---|---|---|---|---|---|
| Choctaws | 0 | 14 | 0 | 7 | 21 |
| Statesmen | 7 | 7 | 14 | 0 | 28 |
