= 2018 Florida Tech Panthers football team =

American college football season

2018 Florida Tech Panthers football
- Conference: Gulf South Conference
- Record: 8–4 (5–3 GSC)
- Head coach: Steve Englehart (6th season)
- Offensive coordinator: Jayson Martin (6th season)
- Defensive coordinator: Rick Minter (2nd season)
- Home stadium: Florida Tech Panther Stadium

2018 Gulf South Conference football standings
	Conf.			Overall
Team	W		L	W		L
No. 1 Valdosta State $^	8	–	0	14	–	0
No. 16 West Georgia ^	7	–	1	10	–	2
Florida Tech ^	5	–	3	8	–	4
West Alabama ^	5	–	3	8	–	4
West Florida	4	–	4	6	–	5
North Greenville	3	–	4	4	–	6
Delta State	2	–	6	2	–	8
Mississippi College	1	–	6	3	–	7
Shorter	0	–	8	0	–	11
$ – Conference champion; ^ – NCAA Division II playoff participant; Rankings from AFCA Poll

The 2018 Florida Tech Panthers football team represented Florida Institute of Technology (FIT) during the 2018 NCAA Division II football season. They were led by sixth-year head coach Steve Englehart. The Panthers played their home games at Florida Tech Panther Stadium, approximately one mile from the Florida Tech campus, and were members of the Gulf South Conference.

The 2018 season saw FIT finish with a record of 8-4, earning their second trip to the NCAA Division II Football Championship where they were eliminated in the first round at Lenoir-Rhyne. The Panthers finished with a record of 5-3 in GSC play, including their first ever win over in-state rival West Florida with a 30-28 victory in Pensacola that saw them record the largest comeback in program history after trailing by 18 points in the first half.

== Preseason ==
=== Gulf South Conference coaches poll ===
On August 2, 2018, the Gulf South Conference released their preseason coaches poll with the Panthers predicted to finish in 6th place in the conference.

Predicted finish	Team	Votes (1st place)
1	West Alabama	62 (6)
2	West Florida	59 (3)
3	West Georgia	44
4	Delta State	41
5	Valdosta State	38
6	Florida Tech	32
7	North Greenville	24
8	Mississippi College	16
9	Shorter	8

=== Preseason All-Gulf South Conference Team ===
The Panthers had four players at four positions selected to the preseason all-Gulf South Conference team.

Offense

Romell Guerrier – WR

Antwuan Haynes – RB

Defense

Adonis Davis – DL

J. T. Hassell – LB

== Schedule ==
Florida Tech 2018 football schedule consists of five home and six away games in the regular season. The Panthers will host GSC foes Delta State, Mississippi College, North Greenville, and Valdosta State, and will travel to Shorter, West Alabama, West Florida, and West Georgia.

The Panthers will host one of the three non-conference games against Newberry from the South Atlantic Conference (SAC) and will travel to Benedict from the Southern Intercollegiate Athletic Conference and Wingate also from the SAC.

Two of the eleven games will be broadcast on ESPN3, as part of the Gulf South Conference Game of the Week.

Date	Time	Opponent	Site	TV	Result	Attendance
September 1	6:00 p.m.	at Benedict*	Charlie W. Johnson Stadium; Columbia, SC		W 33-14	1,528
September 8	1:00 p.m.	Newberry*	Florida Tech Panther Stadium; Melbourne, FL		W 17-10	2,500
September 15	7:00 p.m.	Delta State	Florida Tech Panther Stadium; Melbourne, FL	ESPN3	W 30-12	3,567
September 22	2:00 p.m.	at No. 8 West Georgia	University Stadium; Carrollton, GA		L 21-30	2,524
September 29	3:00 p.m.	at Wingate*	Irwin Belk Stadium; Wingate, NC	ESPN3	W 26-23	2,171
October 6	7:00 p.m.	Mississippi College	Florida Tech Panther Stadium; Melbourne, FL		W 31-24	2,543
October 13	1:00 p.m.	No. 8 Valdosta State^{†}	Florida Tech Panther Stadium; Melbourne, FL		L 21-51	3,679
October 20	5:00 p.m.	at No. 17 West Florida	Blue Wahoos Stadium; Pensacola, FL (Coastal Classic)		W 30-28	5,191
October 27	5:00 p.m.	at West Alabama	Tiger Stadium; Livingston, AL	ESPN3	L 22-29	5,106
November 3	2:00 p.m.	North Greenville	Florida Tech Panther Stadium; Melbourne, FL		W 37-7	2,800
November 10	1:00 p.m.	at Shorter	Barron Stadium; Rome, GA		W 55-7	1,575
November 17	2:00 p.m.	at No. 17 Lenoir-Rhyne	Moretz Stadium; Hickory, NC (Division II Playoffs First Round)		L 21-43	2,436
*Non-conference game; ^{†}Homecoming; Rankings from AFCA Poll released prior to the game; All times are in Eastern time

Schedule source:

=== Rankings ===
Ranking movements Legend: ██ Increase in ranking ██ Decrease in ranking — = Not ranked RV = Received votes
	Week												
Poll	Pre	1	2	3	4	5	6	7	8	9	10	11	Final
AFCA	RV	RV	RV	RV	RV	RV	RV	—	RV	—	—	RV	RV

== Game summaries ==
=== At Benedict ===
	1	2	3	4	Total
Panthers	16	3	7	7	33
Tigers	7	0	0	7	14

=== Newberry ===
	1	2	3	4	Total
Wolves	0	3	7	0	10
Panthers	0	7	10	0	17

=== Delta State ===
	1	2	3	4	Total
Statesmen	0	6	6	0	12
Panthers	21	9	0	0	30

=== At West Georgia ===
	1	2	3	4	Total
Panthers	7	7	7	0	21
Wolves	7	0	10	13	30

=== At Wingate ===
	1	2	3	4	Total
Panthers	0	7	7	12	26
Bulldogs	0	10	7	6	23

=== Mississippi College ===
	1	2	3	4	Total
Choctaws	0	14	7	3	24
Panthers	3	7	7	14	31

=== Valdosta State ===
	1	2	3	4	Total
Blazers	14	10	0	27	51
Panthers	0	0	7	14	21

=== At West Florida ===
	1	2	3	4	Total
Panthers	3	7	10	10	30
Argonauts	14	7	0	7	28

=== At West Alabama ===
	1	2	3	4	Total
Panthers	0	10	9	3	22
Tigers	14	0	7	8	29

=== North Greenville ===
	1	2	3	4	Total
Crusaders	0	0	7	0	7
Panthers	20	10	7	0	37

=== At Shorter ===
	1	2	3	4	Total
Panthers	10	28	10	7	55
Hawks	0	0	0	7	7

=== At Lenoir-Rhyne ===
	1	2	3	4	Total
Panthers	7	0	14	0	21
Bears	17	10	13	3	43

== Awards and milestones ==
=== Gulf South Conference honors ===
Four players from Florida Tech were honored as All-GSC selections by the league's coaches. Linebacker J.T. Hassell was named the GSC Defensive Player of the Year, becoming the second Panther to receive the honor.

- Gulf South Conference Defensive Player of the Year: J.T. Hassell

==== Gulf South Conference All-Conference First Team ====
- J.T. Hassell, LB
- Adonis Davis, DL
- Romell Guerrier, WR

==== Gulf South Conference All-Conference Second Team ====
- Antwuan Haynes, RB

==== Gulf South Conference offensive player of the week ====
- October 22: Romell Guerrier

==== Gulf South Conference defensive player of the week ====
- September 10: J.T. Hassell
- October 1: J.T. Hassell
- October 29: J.T. Hassell
- November 5: Dezmond Morgan

==== Gulf South Conference special teams player of the week ====
- November 5: Trey Schaneville

=== School records ===
- Most career rushing yards: 3,496, Antwuan Haynes
- Most career rushing touchdowns: 25, Antwuan Haynes
- Most career sacks: 23, Adonis Davis
- Most career tackles for loss: 52, Adonis Davis
- Most touchdown receptions in a season: 13, Romell Guerrier
- Most tackles in a season: 124, J.T. Hassell
- Most interceptions in a season: 4, John McClure
- Most defensive touchdowns in a season: 3, Richard Leveille
- Most tackles in a game: 20, J.T. Hassell (October 6, 2018)
- Most sacks in a single game: 4, J.T. Hassell (September 29, 2018)
- T-Most interceptions in a single game: 2, Dezmond Morgan (November 3, 2018) and John McClure (September 1, 2018)
- T-Most tackles for loss in a single game: 4, J.T. Hassell (September 29, 2018)
- Most carries in a single game: 29, Antwuan Haynes (October 20, 2018)
- Largest comeback: 18 at West Florida (October 20, 2018)
- Most points scored in single game: 55 at Shorter (November 10, 2018)
