= 2018 West Alabama Tigers football team =

American college football season

2018 West Alabama Tigers football
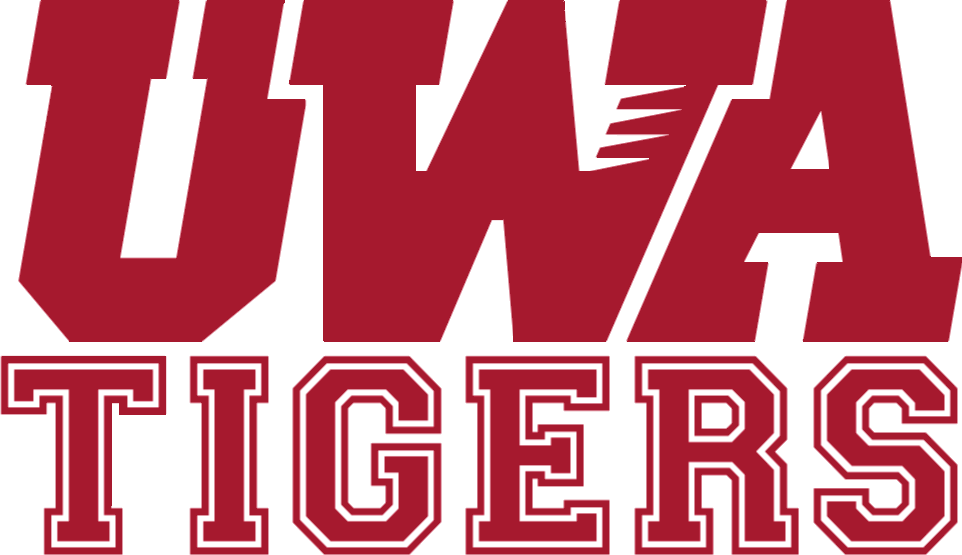

NCAA Division II First Round, L 35–41 vs. Bowie State
- Conference: Gulf South Conference
- Record: 8–4 (5–3 GSC)
- Head coach: Brett Gilliland (5th season)
- Offensive coordinator: Don Bailey (3rd season)
- Defensive coordinator: Steve Sisa (2nd season)
- Home stadium: Tiger Stadium

2018 Gulf South Conference football standings
	Conf.			Overall
Team	W		L	W		L
No. 1 Valdosta State $^	8	–	0	14	–	0
No. 16 West Georgia ^	7	–	1	10	–	2
Florida Tech ^	5	–	3	8	–	4
West Alabama ^	5	–	3	8	–	4
West Florida	4	–	4	6	–	5
North Greenville	3	–	4	4	–	6
Delta State	2	–	6	2	–	8
Mississippi College	1	–	6	3	–	7
Shorter	0	–	8	0	–	11
$ – Conference champion; ^ – NCAA Division II playoff participant; Rankings from AFCA Poll

The 2018 West Alabama Tigers football team represented University of West Alabama during the 2018 NCAA Division II football season. They were led by fifth-year head coach Brett Gilliland. The Tigers played their home games at Tiger Stadium and are members of the Gulf South Conference.

== Preseason ==
=== Gulf South Conference coaches poll ===
On August 2, 2018, the Gulf South Conference released their preseason coaches poll with the Tigers predicted to finish in 1st place in the conference.

Predicted finish	Team	Votes (1st place)
1	West Alabama	62 (6)
2	West Florida	59 (3)
3	West Georgia	44
4	Delta State	41
5	Valdosta State	38
6	Florida Tech	32
7	North Greenville	24
8	Mississippi College	16
9	Shorter	8

=== Preseason All-Gulf South Conference Team ===
The Tigers had seven players at seven positions selected to the preseason all-Gulf South Conference team.

Offense

Brandon Anderson – OT

Qua Boyd – TE

Call Dyer – C

Harry Satterwhite – QB

Defense

Darius Ellis – DL

Terry Samuel – LB

Special teams

Zach Gaines – P

== Schedule ==
West Alabama 2018 football schedule consists of six home and five away games in the regular season. The Tigers will host GSC foes Delta State, Florida Tech, Valdosta State, and West Florida, and will travel to Mississippi College, North Greenville, Shorter, and West Georgia.

The Tigers will host two of the three non-conference games against Lenoir–Rhyne from the South Atlantic Conference (SAC) and Miles College from the Southern Intercollegiate Athletic Conference (SIAC) and will travel to Limestone, which is an independent team.

Three of the eleven games will be broadcast on ESPN3, as part of the Gulf South Conference Game of the Week.

Date	Time	Opponent	Rank	Site	TV	Result	Attendance
August 30	6:00 p.m.	Lenoir–Rhyne*	No. 12	Tiger Stadium; Livingston, AL		W 36–32	3,248
September 6	6:00 p.m.	Miles*	No. 11	Tiger Stadium; Livingston, AL		W 37–21	4,543
September 15	6:00 p.m.	Valdosta State	No. 8	Tiger Stadium; Livingston, AL		L 24–58	3,285
September 22	12:00 p.m.	at Limestone*	No. 23	The Reservation; Gaffney, SC		W 16–13	1,632
September 29	6:00 p.m.	at North Greenville	No. 21	Younts Stadium; Tigerville, SC	ESPN3	L 16–20	3,695
October 6	12:00 p.m.	at Shorter		Barron Stadium; Rome, GA		W 48–17	1,384
October 13	2:00 p.m.	Delta State		Tiger Stadium; Livingston, AL	ESPN3	W 17–14	3,872
October 20	1:00 p.m.	at No. 3 West Georgia		University Stadium; Carrollton, GA		L 25–27	3,687
October 27	4:00 p.m.	Florida Tech^{†}		Tiger Stadium; Livingston, AL	ESPN3	W 29–22	5,106
November 3	2:00 p.m.	at Mississippi College		Robinson-Hale Stadium; Clinton, MS		W 24–3	4,347
November 10	2:00 p.m.	West Florida		Tiger Stadium; Livingston, AL		W 45–7	4,303
November 17	12:00 p.m.	at No. 25 Bowie State		Bulldogs Stadium; Bowie, MD (NCAA Division II First Round)		L 35–41	1,531
*Non-conference game; ^{†}Homecoming; Rankings from AFCA Poll released prior to the game; All times are in Central time

== Rankings ==
Ranking movements Legend: ██ Increase in ranking ██ Decrease in ranking — = Not ranked RV = Received votes
	Week												
Poll	Pre	1	2	3	4	5	6	7	8	9	10	11	Final
AFCA	12	11	8	23	21	RV	—	—	—	—	—	RV	RV

== Game summaries ==
=== Lenoir-Rhyne ===
	1	2	3	4	Total
Bears	3	10	6	13	32
Tigers	7	7	0	22	36

=== Miles ===
	1	2	3	4	Total
Golden Bears	7	7	0	7	21
Tigers	6	14	14	3	37

=== Valdosta State ===
	1	2	3	4	Total
Blazers	21	14	10	13	58
Tigers	7	7	7	3	24

=== At Limestone ===
	1	2	3	4	Total
Tigers	3	10	0	3	16
Saints	10	3	0	0	13

=== At North Greenville ===
	1	2	3	4	Total
Tigers	7	0	9	0	16
Crusaders	0	10	0	10	20

=== At Shorter ===
	1	2	3	4	Total
Tigers	14	17	14	3	48
Hawks	7	0	3	7	17

=== Delta State ===
	1	2	3	4	Total
Statesmen	7	0	7	0	14
Tigers	7	7	0	3	17

=== At West Georgia ===
	1	2	3	4	Total
Tigers	7	0	6	12	25
Wolves	7	7	3	10	27

=== Florida Tech ===
	1	2	3	4	Total
Panthers	0	10	9	3	22
Tigers	14	0	7	8	29

=== At Mississippi College ===
	1	2	3	4	Total
Tigers	0	10	7	7	24
Choctaws	0	3	0	0	3

=== West Florida ===
	1	2	3	4	Total
Argonauts	7	0	0	0	7
Tigers	16	13	9	7	45

=== At Bowie State ===
	1	2	3	4	Total
Tigers	7	7	7	14	35
Bulldogs	0	17	10	14	41
