= 2018 West Georgia Wolves football team =

American college football season

2018 West Georgia Wolves football
- Conference: Gulf South Conference

Ranking
- Coaches: No. 16
- Record: 10–2 (7–1 GSC)
- Head coach: David Dean (2nd season)
- Offensive coordinator: Sam Gregg (5th season)
- Defensive coordinator: Dustin Landry (1st season)
- Home stadium: University Stadium

2018 Gulf South Conference football standings
	Conf.			Overall
Team	W		L	W		L
No. 1 Valdosta State $^	8	–	0	14	–	0
No. 16 West Georgia ^	7	–	1	10	–	2
Florida Tech ^	5	–	3	8	–	4
West Alabama ^	5	–	3	8	–	4
West Florida	4	–	4	6	–	5
North Greenville	3	–	4	4	–	6
Delta State	2	–	6	2	–	8
Mississippi College	1	–	6	3	–	7
Shorter	0	–	8	0	–	11
$ – Conference champion; ^ – NCAA Division II playoff participant; Rankings from AFCA Poll

The 2018 West Georgia Wolves football team represented the University of West Georgia in the 2018 NCAA Division II football season. They were led by second-year head coach David Dean. The Wolves played their home games at University Stadium and were members of the Gulf South Conference.

== Schedule ==
West Georgia 2018 football schedule consists of six home and five away games in the regular season. The Wolves will host GSC foes Florida Tech, West Alabama, Delta State, and North Greenville, and will travel to Mississippi College, and Shorter, Valdosta State, and West Florida.

The Wolves will host two of the three non-conference games against Catawba from the South Atlantic Conference (SAC) and Limestone also from SAC and will travel to Albany State from the Southern Intercollegiate Athletic Conference.

Two of the eleven games will be broadcast on ESPN3, as part of the Gulf South Conference Game of the Week.

Date	Time	Opponent	Rank	Site	TV	Result	Attendance
September 1	2:00 p.m.	Catawba*	No. 19	University Stadium; Carrollton, GA		W 34-3	3,200
September 8	2:00 p.m.	Limestone*	No. 13	University Stadium; Carrollton, GA		W 42-14	2,900
September 15	7:00 p.m.	at Albany State*	No. 10	Albany State University Coliseum; Albany, GA		W 45-21	5,000
September 22	2:00 p.m.	Florida Tech	No. 8	University Stadium; Carrollton, GA		W 30-21	2,524
September 29	1:00 p.m.	at Shorter	No. 6	Barron Stadium; Rome, GA		W 58-27	1,345
October 6	2:00 p.m.	North Greenville	No. 5	University Stadium; Carrollton, GA	ESPN3	W 31-7	1,788
October 13	7:00 p.m.	at No. 10 West Florida	No. 4	Blue Wahoos Stadium; Pensacola, FL	ESPN3	W 27-7	6,838
October 20	2:00 p.m.	West Alabama	No. 3	University Stadium; Carrollton, GA		W 27-25	3,687
October 27	4:00 p.m.	at Mississippi College	No. 3	Robinson-Hale Stadium; Clinton, MS		W 36-21	6,872
November 3	2:00 p.m.	Delta State	No. 3	University Stadium; Carrollton, GA		W 29-17	3,281
November 10	7:00 p.m.	at No. 5 Valdosta State	No. 3	Bazemore–Hyder Stadium; Valdosta, GA (Rivalry)	ESPN3	L 31-47	10,558
November 17	12:00 p.m.	Wingate	No. 10	University Stadium; Carrollton, GA (Division II Playoffs First Round)		L 31-41	1,702
*Non-conference game; Rankings from AFCA Poll released prior to the game; All times are in Eastern time

Schedule source:

=== Rankings ===
Ranking movements Legend: ██ Increase in ranking ██ Decrease in ranking
	Week												
Poll	Pre	1	2	3	4	5	6	7	8	9	10	11	Final
AFCA	19	13	10	8	6	5	4	4	3	3	3	10	16

== Game summaries ==
=== Catawba ===
	1	2	3	4	Total
Indians	3	0	0	0	3
Wolves	0	7	6	21	34

=== Limestone ===
	1	2	3	4	Total
Saints	7	0	7	0	14
Wolves	21	7	14	0	42

=== At Albany State ===
	1	2	3	4	Total
Wolves	7	10	21	7	45
Rams	7	14	0	0	21

=== Florida Tech ===
	1	2	3	4	Total
Panthers	7	7	7	0	21
Wolves	7	0	10	13	30

=== At Shorter ===
	1	2	3	4	Total
Wolves	14	24	13	7	58
Hawks	0	14	7	6	27

=== North Greenville ===
	1	2	3	4	Total
Crusaders	0	0	0	7	7
Wolves	7	17	7	0	31

=== At West Florida ===
	1	2	3	4	Total
Wolves	3	10	7	7	27
Argonauts	0	7	0	0	7

=== West Alabama ===
	1	2	3	4	Total
Tigers	7	0	6	12	25
Wolves	7	7	3	10	27

=== At Mississippi College ===
	1	2	3	4	Total
Wolves	7	10	7	12	36
Choctaws	0	14	7	0	21

=== Delta State ===
	1	2	3	4	Total
Statesmen	7	10	0	0	17
Wolves	3	9	10	7	29

=== At Valdosta State ===
	1	2	3	4	Total
Wolves	7	14	7	3	31
Blazers	10	24	3	10	47

=== Wingate ===
	1	2	3	4	Total
Bulldogs	10	10	7	14	41
Wolves	7	10	14	0	31
