= 2018 Valdosta State Blazers football team =

American college football season

2018 Valdosta State Blazers football

NCAA Division II champion GSC champion

NCAA Division II Championship Game, W 49–47 vs. Ferris State
- Conference: Gulf South Conference

Ranking
- AFCA: No. 1
- Record: 14–0 (8–0 GSC)
- Head coach: Kerwin Bell (3rd season)
- Offensive coordinator: Kade Bell (1st season)
- Defensive coordinator: Danny Verpaele (2nd season)
- Home stadium: Bazemore–Hyder Stadium

2018 Gulf South Conference football standings
	Conf.			Overall
Team	W		L	W		L
No. 1 Valdosta State $^	8	–	0	14	–	0
No. 16 West Georgia ^	7	–	1	10	–	2
Florida Tech ^	5	–	3	8	–	4
West Alabama ^	5	–	3	8	–	4
West Florida	4	–	4	6	–	5
North Greenville	3	–	4	4	–	6
Delta State	2	–	6	2	–	8
Mississippi College	1	–	6	3	–	7
Shorter	0	–	8	0	–	11
$ – Conference champion; ^ – NCAA Division II playoff participant; Rankings from AFCA poll

The 2018 Valdosta State Blazers football team represented Valdosta State University as a member of the Gulf South Conference (GSC) during the 2018 NCAA Division II football season. They were led by third-year head coach Kerwin Bell, who also served as offensive coordinator. The Blazers played their home games at Bazemore–Hyder Stadium in Valdosta, Georgia. Valdosta State compiled an overall record of 14–0 with a conference mark of 8–0, winning the GSC title. They beat Ferris State in the NCAA Division II Championship Game to win the program's fourth national title.

== Schedule ==
Valdosta State's 2018 regular season football schedule consisted of five home games, four away games, and one neutral site game. The Blazers hosted GSC foes Delta State, North Greenville, Shorter, and West Georgia, and traveled to Florida Tech, Mississippi College, West Alabama, and West Florida. Three games were broadcast on ESPN3, as part of the Gulf South Conference Game of the Week.

The Blazers hosted non-conference foe Albany State from the Southern Intercollegiate Athletic Conference (SIAC) and competed in the Okefenokee Classic against Fort Valley State, also from the (SIAC).

After an undefeated regular season, the Blazers were the No. 1 seed in the NCAA Division II playoffs.

Date	Time	Opponent	Rank	Site	TV	Result	Attendance	Source
September 1	7:00 p.m.	Albany State*		Bazemore–Hyder Stadium; Valdosta, GA		W 45–14	6,770	
September 8	7:00 p.m.	vs. Fort Valley State*		Memorial Stadium; Waycross, GA (Okefenokee Classic)	ESPN3	W 55–6	3,107	
September 15	7:00 p.m.	at No. 8 West Alabama		Tiger Stadium; Livingston, AL		W 58–24	3,285	
September 22	7:00 p.m.	Shorter	No. 16	Bazemore–Hyder Stadium; Valdosta, GA		W 52–0	5,130	
September 29	8:00 p.m.	at Mississippi College	No. 13	Robinson-Hale Stadium; Clinton, MS		W 63–42	2,654	
October 6	1:00 p.m.	Delta State	No. 10	Bazemore–Hyder Stadium; Valdosta, GA		W 59–28	2,036	
October 13	1:00 p.m.	at Florida Tech	No. 8	Florida Tech Panther Stadium; Melbourne, FL		W 51–21	3,679	
October 20	3:00 p.m.	North Greenville^{†}	No. 7	Bazemore–Hyder Stadium; Valdosta, GA		W 44–21	5,514	
November 3	5:00 p.m.	at West Florida	No. 7	Blue Wahoos Stadium; Pensacola, FL	ESPN3	W 48–21	5,893	
November 10	7:00 p.m.	No. 3 West Georgia	No. 5	Bazemore–Hyder Stadium; Valdosta, GA (rivalry)	ESPN3	W 47–31	10,558	
November 24	1:00 pm	No. 25 Bowie State	No. 3	Bazemore–Hyder Stadium; Valdosta, GA (NCAA Division II Second Round)		W 66–16	2,467	
December 1	1:00 pm	No. 17 Lenoir–Rhyne	No. 3	Bazemore–Hyder Stadium; Valdosta, GA (NCAA Division II Quarterfinal)		W 61–21	1,999	
December 8	12:00 pm	No. 11 Notre Dame (OH)	No. 3	Bazemore–Hyder Stadium; Valdosta, GA (NCAA Division II Semifinal)	ESPN3	W 30–24	4,672	
December 15	4:00 p.m.	vs. No. 2 Ferris State	No. 3	McKinney ISD Stadium; McKinney, TX (NCAA Division II National Championship Game)	ESPNU	W 49–47	4,306	
*Non-conference game; ^{†}Homecoming; Rankings from AFCA Poll released prior to the game; All times are in Eastern time

== Rankings ==
Ranking movements Legend: ██ Increase in ranking ██ Decrease in ranking RV = Received votes
	Week												
Poll	Pre	1	2	3	4	5	6	7	8	9	10	11	Final
AFCA	RV	RV	RV	16	13	10	8	7	7	7	5	3	1

== Preseason ==
=== Gulf South Conference coaches poll ===
On August 2, 2018, the Gulf South Conference released their preseason coaches poll with the Blazers predicted to finish in fifth place in the conference.

=== Preseason All-Gulf South Conference Team ===
The Blazers had five players at five positions selected to the preseason all-Gulf South Conference team.

Offense

Kenny Benjamin – AP

Jeremy King – OG

Defense

Raymond Palmer – DB

Special teams

Jairus Jones – BT

Stewart Spence – UTL

== Game summaries ==
=== Albany State ===
	1	2	3	4	Total
Rams	0	0	0	14	14
Blazers	14	14	10	7	45

=== Fort Valley State ===
	1	2	3	4	Total
Wildcats	0	3	3	0	6
Blazers	21	0	6	28	55

=== At West Alabama ===
	1	2	3	4	Total
Blazers	21	14	10	13	58
Tigers	7	7	7	3	24

=== Shorter ===
	1	2	3	4	Total
Hawks	0	0	0	0	0
Blazers	10	0	21	21	52

=== At Mississippi College ===
	1	2	3	4	Total
Blazers	7	35	14	7	63
Choctaws	7	14	14	7	42

=== Delta State ===
	1	2	3	4	Total
Statesmen	14	14	0	0	28
Blazers	14	14	17	14	59

=== At Florida Tech ===
	1	2	3	4	Total
Blazers	14	10	0	27	51
Panthers	0	0	7	14	21

=== North Greenville ===
	1	2	3	4	Total
Crusaders	0	0	7	14	21
Blazers	13	10	7	14	44

=== At West Florida ===
	1	2	3	4	Total
Blazers	14	3	7	24	48
Argonauts	0	14	7	0	21

=== West Georgia ===
	1	2	3	4	Total
Wolves	7	14	7	3	31
Blazers	10	24	3	10	47

=== Bowie State ===
	1	2	3	4	Total
Bulldogs	7	9	0	0	16
Blazers	0	21	17	28	66

=== Lenoir-Rhyne ===
	1	2	3	4	Total
Bears	0	7	7	7	21
Blazers	10	24	13	14	61

=== Notre Dame (OH) ===
	1	2	3	4	Total
Falcons	0	10	7	7	24
Blazers	9	0	21	0	30

=== Ferris State ===
	1	2	3	4	Total
Bulldogs	10	14	14	9	47
Blazers	7	21	14	7	49

== Players drafted into the NFL ==
Round	Pick	Player	Position	NFL Club
7	238	Stephen Denmark	CB	Chicago Bears

== Roster ==
2018 Valdosta State Blazers football team roster
Players
Coaches
Offense

Pos.	#	Name	Class
WR	1	Travon Roberts	So
WR	2	Brian Saunds	So
WR	3	Joe Fortson	Sr
WR	4	Kenny Benjamin	So
WR	6	Lio'undre Gallimore	So
WR	8	Darrell Myers	Jr
QB	9	Ivory Durham	Fr
QB	11	Rogan Wells	RSo
QB	12	Adam Robles	RSr
WR	13	Justice Parham	Fr
WR	14	Dondre Butler	RSo
WR	15	Tanner Jackson	Fr
WR	16	Marik Merine	RJr
RB	20	Jamar Thompkins	RFr
RB	23	Isaiah Johnson	RSo
RB	25	Quahlin Patterson	RJr
RB	30	Seth McGill	Fr
FB	36	Stewart Spence	Sr
FB	40	Kyler Crosby	Fr
FB	45	Josh Turner	Sr
TE	46	Kenneth Henningsen	RFr
FB	46	Jon Jordan	Fr
OL	51	Ralph Singleton	RSo
OL	56	LaVonne Gauthney	RSr
OL	57	Brandon Kemp	RJr
OL	58	Adonis Sealey	Jr
OL	60	Ty Hinson	Fr
OL	61	John Black	Jr
OL	62	Riley Maynard	Fr
OL	63	Terrance Lovett	RFr
OL	64	Emenike Ikpa	RFr
OL	65	Evan Pulawski	RJr
OL	66	Taylor Williams	Fr
OL	69	Jeremy King	RSr
OL	71	Greg Dixon	Fr
OL	72	Jordan Harris	Jr
OL	73	Tyler Dorsett	Fr
OL	74	Preston Langley	RSo
OL	76	Toa Lavatai	Jr
OL	77	Jacob Baker	RSo
OL	79	Tikere Ralands	Sr
WR	80	James Barnes	RSo
WR	81	David White	Fr
WR	82	Reshad Washington	RFr
WR	83	Michael Henderson	Fr
WR	84	Bryndan McCoy	Jr
WR	85	Mike McCray	Fr
WR	86	D.J. Whitfield	Fr
TE	87	Travis Taylor	So
WR	89	Isaiah Wilson	RFr
RB		Aleem Coley	Fr
WR		Theodore Ingram	Fr
OL		Brock Jones	Fr
OL		Kwan Stallworth	Sr
QB		Wayna Williams	Fr

Defense

Pos.	#	Name	Class
DL	1	Guito Ervilus	Sr
DL	2	Jameel Padgett	Jr
LB	5	Nick Moss	Jr
DB	6	Ravarius Rivers	RJr
LB	7	David Brown	Sr
DL	8	Iseoluwapo Jegede	Sr
LB	9	Craig Watts	So
DB	10	Stephen Denmark	Sr
DB	15	Taurus Dotson	RFr
DB	19	Cory Roberts	RSo
DB	21	Raynell Killian	Fr
DB	22	Tyrell Lyons	Sr
DB	23	Bryant Pinkney	Jr
DB	24	Alex Brown	Jr
DB	26	Denzel Heck	Jr
DB	26	Jairus Jones	So
DB	27	Felix Dixon	So
DB	28	Raymond Palmer	Sr
DB	29	Marquez Walls	Jr
DB	31	Aaron Dawson	Fr
DB	32	Eric Ross	RFr
DB	33	Michael Williams	Fr
DL	34	Walker Schwab	Fr
DB	35	Diop Kee	Fr
DB	37	Mondrell Jefferson	RSo
LB	38	Jackson Bull	Fr
LB	39	Malcolm McClenton	Jr
DB	40	Chris White	Jr
LB	42	Kahari Richards	RSo
LB	43	Antonio Keuma	RSo
LB	44	Tyson Shaw	Fr
DB	46	Tevin Small	Fr
LB	47	Jameon Gaskin	Fr
DL	48	Alex Williams	Sr
LB	50	Tyler Wallace	RSo
DL	52	Jeffery Stokes	Sr
DL	53	Mitch Watson	Sr
DL	54	Isaiah Staton	Sr
LB	55	Donte Carpenter	So
LB	59	Dalton Mydell	Sr
DL	67	Malik Edwards	Fr
DL	68	Grant Palmer	So
DL	73	Trevor Rolison	RFr
DL	75	Joseph Mozone	Jr
DL	90	Leafus Thomas	Jr
DL	91	Javiontae Martin	Fr
DL	92	Jadavien Williams	RSo
DL	93	George Mincey	Fr
LB	94	Thomas Incoom	RFr
DL	95	Rori Blair	Sr
DL	96	Martez Hudson	Fr
DL	97	Makenly Newbill	Fr
DL	99	Darius Smalls	Jr
DL		Vanden Fehmerling	RSo
LB		Dylan Friedmann	Fr
DL		Shicorreus Jones	RFr
LB		Andy Kirt	Fr
DB		Norman Thrasher	RSo

Special teams

Pos.	#	Name	Class
K	41	Andrew Gray	Sr
LS	49	Pippin Davis	RSo
LS	73	Brett Buckridge	Fr
K	96	Rob Cheek	RSo
P	97	Thomas Abbott	RSo
P	98	Gavin Wilson	Sr

Head coach

- Kerwin Bell

Coordinators/assistant coaches

- Jeremy Darveau – Offensive Line / Run Coordinator / Recruiting Coordinator
- Danny Verpaele – Defensive Coordinator/Linebackers Coach
- David Rowe – Defensive Backs Coach
- Kenny McClendon – Defensive Line Coach
- Kerry Webb – Running Backs / Special Teams
- Michael Doscher – Speed, Strength and Conditioning
- Jay Johnson – Head Athletic Trainer
- Marty McGhin – Football Operations
- Tripp Dodd – Defensive Quality Control
- Jonathan Pearce – Offensive Quality Control
- Darin Winters – Special Teams Analyst
- Kade Bell – Graduate Assistant - Quarterbacks
- Phillip Chartier – Graduate Assistant - Equipment Manager
- TJ Jenkins – Graduate Assistant - Defensive Line
- Trent Turknett – Graduate Assistant - Offensive Analyst
- Carson Hall – Graduate Assistant - Outside Linebackers
- Andrew Robustelli – Graduate Assistant - Wide Receivers
- John Peacock – Student Assistant - Fullbacks / Tight Ends
- Larry Murphy – Student Assistant - Defensive Backs

Legend

- (C) Team captain
- (S) Suspended
- (I) Ineligible
- Injured
- Redshirt

Roster
