= 2018 West Florida Argonauts football team =

American college football season

2018 West Florida Argonauts football
- Conference: Gulf South Conference
- Record: 6–5 (4–4 GSC)
- Head coach: Pete Shinnick (3rd season)
- Offensive coordinator: Jammie Deese (3rd season)
- Defensive coordinator: Darian Dulin (2nd season)
- Home stadium: Blue Wahoos Stadium

2018 Gulf South Conference football standings
	Conf.			Overall
Team	W		L	W		L
No. 1 Valdosta State $^	8	–	0	14	–	0
No. 16 West Georgia ^	7	–	1	10	–	2
Florida Tech ^	5	–	3	8	–	4
West Alabama ^	5	–	3	8	–	4
West Florida	4	–	4	6	–	5
North Greenville	3	–	4	4	–	6
Delta State	2	–	6	2	–	8
Mississippi College	1	–	6	3	–	7
Shorter	0	–	8	0	–	11
$ – Conference champion; ^ – NCAA Division II playoff participant; Rankings from AFCA poll

The 2018 West Florida Argonauts football team represented the University of West Florida in the 2018 NCAA Division II football season. They were led by third-year head coach Pete Shinnick. The Argonauts played their home games at Blue Wahoos Stadium and are members of the Gulf South Conference.

== Schedule ==
West Florida 2018 football schedule consists of five home and six away games in the regular season. The Argonauts will host GSC foes Florida Tech, Shorter, Valdosta State, and West Georgia, and will travel to Delta State, Mississippi College, North Greenville, and West Alabama.

The Argonauts will host one of the three non-conference games against Carson–Newman from the South Atlantic Conference (SAC) and will travel to Midwestern State from the Lone Star Conference and North Alabama, which is a FCS Independent team.

Two of the eleven games will be broadcast on ESPN3, as part of the Gulf South Conference Game of the Week.

Date	Time	Opponent	Rank	Site	TV	Result	Attendance
August 30	7:00 p.m.	No. 22 Carson–Newman*	No. 2	Blue Wahoos Stadium; Pensacola, FL	BLAB TV	W 19–9	5,673
September 8	6:00 p.m.	at No. 10 Midwestern State*	No. 2	Memorial Stadium; Wichita Falls, TX		L 17-38	8,258
September 15	6:00 p.m.	Shorter	No. 13	Blue Wahoos Stadium; Pensacola, FL	BLAB TV	W 51-7	5,479
September 22	7:00 p.m.	at Mississippi College	No. 10	Robinson-Hale Stadium; Clinton, MS	ESPN3	W 34-21	3,347
September 29	6:00 p.m.	at Delta State	No. 11	McCool Stadium; Cleveland, MS		W 30-21	5,678
October 6	6:00 p.m.	at North Alabama*	No. 11	Braly Municipal Stadium; Florence, AL	Lion Vision	W 24-19	6,811
October 13	6:00 p.m.	No. 4 West Georgia^{†}	No. 10	Blue Wahoos Stadium; Pensacola, FL	ESPN3	L 7-27	6,838
October 20	4:00 p.m.	Florida Tech	No. 17	Blue Wahoos Stadium; Pensacola, FL	BLAB TV	L 28-30	5,191
October 27	12:00 p.m.	at North Greenville		Younts Stadium; Tigerville, SC	BLAB TV	W 26-10	2,687
November 3	2:00 p.m.	No. 7 Valdosta State		Blue Wahoos Stadium; Pensacola, FL	ESPN3	L 21-48	5,893
November 10	2:00 p.m.	West Alabama		Tiger Stadium; Livingston, AL		L 7-45	4,303
*Non-conference game; ^{†}Homecoming; Rankings from AFCA Poll released prior to the game; All times are in Central time

Schedule source:

=== Rankings ===
Ranking movements Legend: ██ Increase in ranking ██ Decrease in ranking — = Not ranked RV = Received votes ( ) = First-place votes
	Week												
Poll	Pre	1	2	3	4	5	6	7	8	9	10	11	Final
AFCA	2	2 (6)	13	10	11	11	10	17	RV	—	—	—	—

== Game summaries ==
=== Carson-Newman ===
	1	2	3	4	Total
Eagles	0	9	0	0	9
Argonauts	6	0	7	6	19

=== At Midwestern State ===
	1	2	3	4	Total
Argonauts	7	7	0	3	17
Mustangs	0	3	14	21	38

=== Shorter ===
	1	2	3	4	Total
Hawks	0	0	0	7	7
Argonauts	20	17	14	0	51

=== At Mississippi College ===
	1	2	3	4	Total
Argonauts	3	7	14	10	34
Choctaws	0	0	14	7	21

=== At Delta State ===
	1	2	3	4	Total
Argonauts	3	3	10	14	30
Statesmen	7	14	0	0	21

=== At North Alabama ===
	1	2	3	4	Total
Argonauts	3	7	7	7	24
Lions	7	3	3	6	19

=== West Georgia ===
	1	2	3	4	Total
Wolves	3	10	7	7	27
Argonauts	0	7	0	0	7

=== Florida Tech ===
	1	2	3	4	Total
Panthers	3	7	10	10	30
Argonauts	14	7	0	7	28

=== At North Greenville ===
	1	2	3	4	Total
Argonauts	7	6	13	0	26
Crusaders	0	3	0	7	10

=== Valdosta State ===
	1	2	3	4	Total
Blazers	14	3	7	24	48
Argonauts	0	14	7	0	21

=== At West Alabama ===
	1	2	3	4	Total
Argonauts	7	0	0	0	7
Tigers	16	13	9	7	45
