= Graham Craig =

Graham Craig may refer to:

- Graham Craig (priest)
- Graham Craig (American football)
