= Steve Englehart (American football) =

American football player and coach (born 1977)

Current position
- Title: Head coach
- Team: West Georgia
- Conference: UAC
- Record: 1–10

Biographical details
- Born: April 11, 1977 (age 49); Terre Haute, Indiana, U.S.

Playing career
- 1996–1999: Indiana State
- Position: Quarterback

Coaching career (HC unless noted)
- 2002: Rose–Hulman (QB)
- 2003–2005: Rose–Hulman (OC/QB)
- 2006–2009: Rose–Hulman
- 2010: Indiana State (OC/QB)
- 2013–2019: Florida Tech
- 2022–2025: Presbyterian
- 2026–present: West Georgia

Head coaching record
- Overall: 92–84
- Bowls: 1–0
- Tournaments: 0–2 (NCAA D-II playoffs)

Accomplishments and honors

Awards
- 2× GSC Coach of the Year (2014, 2015) AFCA Coach of the Year Award (2025)

Steve Englehart (born April 11, 1977) is an American college football coach and former player. He is the head football coach at the University of West Georgia in Carrollton, Georgia, a position he has held since 2026. Englehart was the head football coach at Presbyterian College from 2022 to 2025. He was the first and only head football coach at the Florida Institute of Technology, serving from program's inception in 2013 to its dissolution in 2019. Englehart was also the head football coach at Rose–Hulman Institute of Technology from 2006 to 2009 and an assistant coach at Indiana State University from 2010 to 2012.

== Personal life ==
Englehart was born in Terre Haute, Indiana, to Steve Englehart and his wife, Debbie. Steve graduated from Terre Haute North High School and later married Carrie May on May 13, 2000. They have three children together, two sons, Caden and Ty, and a daughter, Lila.

Englehart graduated from Indiana State University in Terre Haute, where he played quarterback for the football team under head coaches Dennis Raetz and Tim McGuire.

== Head coaching record ==
Year	Team	Overall	Conference	Standing	Bowl/playoffs
Rose–Hulman Fightin' Engineers (Heartland Collegiate Athletic Conference) (2006–2009)
2006	Rose–Hulman	6–4	3–4	5th	
2007	Rose–Hulman	7–3	4–3	T–3rd	
2008	Rose–Hulman	7–3	5–2	2nd	
2009	Rose–Hulman	6–4	4–3	4th	
Rose–Hulman:		26–14	16–12		
Florida Tech Panthers (Gulf South Conference) (2013–2019)
2013	Florida Tech	5–7	1–5	6th	W ECAC Futures Bowl
2014	Florida Tech	6–5	3–4	5th	
2015	Florida Tech	7–4	5–2	T–2nd	
2016	Florida Tech	8–3	5–2	4th	L NCAA Division II First Round
2017	Florida Tech	5–6	3–5	7th	
2018	Florida Tech	8–4	5–3	T–3rd	L NCAA Division II First Round
2019	Florida Tech	5–6	3–5	T–6th	
Florida Tech:		44–35	25–26		
Presbyterian Blue Hose (Pioneer Football League) (2022–2025)
2022	Presbyterian	1–10	0–8	11th	
2023	Presbyterian	4–7	2–6	T–8th	
2024	Presbyterian	6–6	4–4	T–6th	
2025	Presbyterian	10–2	6–2	T–2nd	
Presbyterian:		21–25	12–20		
West Georgia Wolves (United Athletic Conference) (2026–present)
2026	West Georgia	1–10	0–6		
West Georgia:		1–10	0–6		
Total:		92–84			
