= Kade Bell =

American football player and coach (born 1993)

Current position
- Title: Offensive coordinator, quarterbacks coach
- Team: Pittsburgh
- Conference: ACC

Biographical details
- Born: February 19, 1993 (age 33); Gainesville, Florida, U.S.

Playing career
- 2011–2015: Jacksonville
- Position: Quarterback

Coaching career (HC unless noted)
- 2016: Valdosta State (GA)
- 2017: Valdosta State (PGC/QB)
- 2018: Valdosta State (OC/QB)
- 2019: South Florida (OA)
- 2020: Tusculum (AHC/OC/QB)
- 2021–2023: Western Carolina (OC/QB)
- 2024–present: Pittsburgh (OC/QB)

Kade Bell (born February 19, 1993) is an American college football coach and former player. He is the offensive coordinator and quarterbacks coach at the University of Pittsburgh.

== Playing career ==
Bell played quarterback at Jacksonville from 2011 to 2015, under his father Kerwin Bell. In his junior year, he was named to the All-Pioneer Football League first team after throwing for 3,181 yards with 31 touchdowns and 12 interceptions.

== Coaching career ==
Bell began his coaching career as a graduate assistant under his father at Valdosta State in 2016. He was promoted to offensive passing game coordinator in 2017, taking over play-calling duties from his father midway through the season and was promoted to offensive coordinator in 2018. Under Bell, Valdosta State broke the NCAA Division II record for most points scored in a season as they won the NCAA Division II national championship.

Bell joined his father at South Florida as an offensive analyst in 2019, but wanted to get back into an on-coaching role and joined the coaching staff at Tusculum in 2020 as the associate head coach and offensive coordinator.

Bell was named the offensive coordinator and quarterbacks coach at Western Carolina in 2021, working under his father once again. In his final season with Western Carolina, the Catamounts had a top-10 offense, averaging 37.6 points per game.

=== Pittsburgh ===
Bell was named the offensive coordinator at Pittsburgh on December 10, 2023.
