= 2018 North Alabama Lions football team =

American college football season

2018 North Alabama Lions football
- Conference: Independent
- Record: 7–3
- Head coach: Chris Willis (2nd season)
- Offensive coordinator: Ryan Aplin (1st season)
- Defensive coordinator: Steadman Campbell (1st season)
- Home stadium: Braly Municipal Stadium

2018 NCAA Division I FCS independents football standings
	Conf.			Overall
Team	W		L	W		L
North Alabama		–		7	–	3
Hampton		–		7	–	3
North Dakota		–		6	–	5

The 2018 North Alabama Lions football team represented the University of North Alabama as an independent during the 2018 NCAA Division I FCS football season. Led by second-year head coach Chris Willis, the Lions compiled a record of 7–3. North Alabama played home games at Braly Municipal Stadium in Florence, Alabama.

== Schedule ==
Date	Time	Opponent	Site	TV	Result	Attendance
September 1	6:00 p.m.	at Southern Utah	Eccles Coliseum; Cedar City, UT	Pluto TV	W 34–30	8,912
September 8	6:00 p.m.	at Alabama A&M	Louis Crews Stadium; Huntsville, AL		W 25–20	15,100
September 15	2:30 p.m.	at No. 1 North Dakota State	Fargodome; Fargo, ND	ESPN+	L 7–38	18,557
September 22	6:00 p.m.	Azusa Pacific	Braly Municipal Stadium; Florence, AL	Lion Vision	W 37–35	5,314
September 29	5:00 p.m.	at Campbell	Barker–Lane Stadium; Buies Creek, NC	ESPN+	L 7–30	6,352
October 6	6:00 p.m.	West Florida	Braly Municipal Stadium; Florence, AL	Lion Vision	L 19–24	6,811
October 13	6:00 p.m.	Mississippi College^{†}	Braly Municipal Stadium; Florence, AL	Lion Vision	W 34–17	9,230
October 20	2:00 p.m.	at Jackson State	Mississippi Veterans Memorial Stadium; Jackson, MS	Livestream	W 24–7	19,750
November 3	1:30 p.m.	Shorter	Braly Municipal Stadium; Florence, AL	Lion Vision	W 41–14	6,289
November 10	1:30 p.m.	North Greenville	Braly Municipal Stadium; Florence, AL	Lion Vision	W 31–28	6,130
^{†}Homecoming; Rankings from STATS Poll released prior to the game; All times are in Central time

== Rankings ==
Ranking movements Legend: ██ Increase in ranking ██ Decrease in ranking — = Not ranked RV = Received votes
	Week													
Poll	Pre	1	2	3	4	5	6	7	8	9	10	11	12	Final
STATS FCS	—	RV	RV	RV	—	—	—	—	—	—	—	—	—	
Coaches	—	—	—	—	—	—	—	—	—	—	—	—	—	

== Game summaries ==
=== At Southern Utah ===
North Alabama Lions (0-0) vs. Southern Utah Thunderbirds (0-0) – Game summary

Quarter	1	2	3	4	Total
Lions	3	10	7	14	34
Thunderbirds	0	16	7	7	30

at Eccles Coliseum • Cedar City, UT

- Date: September 1
- Game time: 7:00 PM CDT
- Game weather: Wind: WSW at 5 miles per hour (8.0 km/h) •Weather: Clear • Temp: 80 °F (27 °C)
- Game attendance: 8,912
- Referee: Bruce Bondi
- TV announcers (PlutoTV): Dr. Art Challis (play-by-play) and Devin Dixon (analyst)

Game information

First Quarter

Second Quarter

Third Quarter

Fourth Quarter

=== At Alabama A&M ===
	1	2	3	4	Total
Lions	8	10	0	7	25
Bulldogs	7	10	3	0	20

=== At North Dakota State ===
	1	2	3	4	Total
Lions	0	0	0	7	7
No. 1 Bison	7	10	7	14	38

=== Azusa Pacific ===
	1	2	3	4	Total
Cougars	6	0	14	15	35
Lions	3	6	10	18	37

=== At Campbell ===
	1	2	3	4	Total
Lions	0	0	7	0	7
Fighting Camels	23	0	7	0	30

=== West Florida ===
	1	2	3	4	Total
Argonauts	3	7	7	7	24
Lions	7	3	3	6	19

=== Mississippi College ===
	1	2	3	4	Total
Choctaws	7	7	3	0	17
Lions	21	10	0	3	34

=== At Jackson State ===
	1	2	3	4	Total
Lions	7	7	10	0	24
Tigers	0	0	0	7	7

=== Shorter ===
	1	2	3	4	Total
Hawks	0	0	7	7	14
Lions	14	14	10	3	41

=== North Greenville ===
	1	2	3	4	Total
Crusaders	7	7	0	14	28
Lions	5	7	9	10	31
