= David Dean =

American football player and coach (born 1964)

Current position
- Title: Head coach
- Team: Delta State
- Conference: GSC
- Record: 0–0

Biographical details
- Born: February 3, 1964 (age 62); Decatur, Georgia, U.S.

Playing career
- 1982–1985: Georgia Tech
- Position: Wide receiver

Coaching career (HC unless noted)
- 1986: Georgia Tech (GA)
- 1987: Avondale HS (GA) (WR)
- 1988–1991: Valdosta State (WR)
- 1992: West Georgia (RB)
- 1993–1997: West Georgia (RB/ST)
- 1998–1999: West Georgia (OC/QB)
- 2000–2006: Valdosta State (OC/QB)
- 2007–2015: Valdosta State
- 2016: Georgia Southern (co-OC/WR)
- 2017–2023: West Georgia
- 2024–2025: Lanier County HS (GA)
- 2026–present: Delta State

Head coaching record
- Overall: 127–47 (college); 1–7 (high school)
- Tournaments: 14–7 (NCAA D-II playoffs)

Accomplishments and honors

Championships
- 2 NCAA Division II (2007, 2012); 1 GSC (2010)

Awards
- 2× AFCA Division II Coach of the Year (2007, 2012); Schutt Sports Division II Coach of the Year (2007); AFCA Regional Coach of the Year (2010); 2× Gulf South Conference Co-Coach of the Year (2010, 2018)

David Dean (born February 3, 1964) is an American college football coach and former player. He is the head coach at Delta State University, a position he has held since 2026. He was previously the head football coach for the University of West Georgia from 2017 to 2023. Dean served as the head football coach at Valdosta State University from 2007 to 2015, compiling a record of 79–27 in nine seasons. His teams at Valdosta State won the NCAA Division II Football Championship in 2007 and in 2012.

== Playing career ==
Dean attended Avondale High School in Avondale Estates, Georgia before walking on for the Georgia Tech football team in 1982. He earned a scholarship the following year and played through the 1985 season as a wide receiver. He was a graduate assistant for the team in 1986.

== Coaching career ==
Dean coached wide receivers at his alma mater, Avondale High School, in 1987. He was an assistant at Valdosta State from 1988 to 1991. From 1992 to 1999 he was an assistant at University of West Georgia. From 2000 to 2006 he was offensive coordinator for Valdosta State. In his first season in 2000, his quarterback Dusty Bonner won the Harlon Hill Trophy. During this period Valdosta State played in the Division II title game in 2002 and won the national championship in 2004.

=== Head coaching career ===
In 2007, Dean was named head coach of the Blazers in 2007 after Chris Hatcher took the head coaching job at Georgia Southern University. The "Dean Machine" started the season with five straight wins. Delta State University defeated the Blazers 35–31, despite being down 28 points at the beginning of the second half. The Blazers then capped off the season with an eight-game winning streak and their second national championship title win against Northwest Missouri State University, 25–20. This was the third straight championship appearance by the Bearcats, also the third straight time the Bearcats lost the national championship game. Dean is only the second head coach to lead his team to a national championship in his first season. Earle Solomonson accomplished this at North Dakota State University in 1985.

The 2008 season saw the Blazers make it to the second round of the NCAA Division II playoffs and a 9–3 season, 6–2 in the Gulf South Conference. In 2009, after a 6–4 season in which they finished third in the Gulf South Conference, the Blazers did not make the postseason for the first time under Dean, and for the first time since 2006. Dean led the Blazers to an 8–3 record and back into the NCAA Division II playoffs in 2010, marking the third time in his four years he has led his squad to postseason play. After beginning the year unranked, the Blazers rose as high as #7 in the AFCA poll, before finishing the regular season ranked #17.

In 2011, the Blazers had another 6–4 season and missed the Division II playoffs. VSU finished 4th in the Gulf South Conference in 2011. Valdosta had been ranked as high as No. 4 in the AFCA poll in the first weeks of the 2011 season.

After a 2–2 start to the 2012 season, the Blazers won their next 10 straight games and defeated Winston-Salem State University 35–7 in the NCAA Division II Championship game in Florence, Alabama. The Blazers finished second in the Gulf South Conference after losing to the University of West Alabama. Valdosta State would defeat West Alabama after playing them again in the second round of the NCAA Division II playoffs. David Dean is the first football coach in Valdosta State's history to win two national titles.

Dean left Valdosta State to coach a single, unsuccessful year as co-offensive coordinator at FBS program Georgia Southern; both co-coordinators were fired after one year.

On January 25, 2017, Dean was named the new head coach of former Gulf South Conference rival West Georgia.

On November 13, 2023, Dean resigned from West Georgia.

On June 18, 2024, Dean was hired to take over as the head coach of Lanier County High School in Lakeland, Georgia.

On February 6, 2026, Dean was hired to take over as the head coach of Delta State.

=== Awards and honors ===
Dean was the American Football Coaches Association (AFCA) Division II Coach of the Year in NCAA Division II in 2007 and in 2012, after seasons culminating in National Championships. Dean was also named the 2007 Division II Coach of the Year by American Football Weekly and Schutt Sports. Dean was a runner up for Liberty Mutual Coach of the Year in 2008 for Division II. In 2010, he was the AFCA Regional Coach of the Year for NCAA Division II Region 2 and the Gulf South Conference's Co-Coach of the Year.

== Head coaching record ==
=== College ===
Year	Team	Overall	Conference	Standing	Bowl/playoffs	AFCA^{#}
Valdosta State Blazers (Gulf South Conference) (2007–2015)
2007	Valdosta State	13–1	7–1	T–2nd	W NCAA Division II Championship	1
2008	Valdosta State	9–3	6–2	3rd	L NCAA Division II Second Round	12
2009	Valdosta State	6–4	5–3	T–3rd		
2010	Valdosta State	8–3	6–2	T–1st	L NCAA Division II First Round	17
2011	Valdosta State	6–4	1–3	5th		
2012	Valdosta State	12–2	4–1	2nd	W NCAA Division II Championship	1
2013	Valdosta State	6–4	3–3	T–4th		
2014	Valdosta State	10–3	5–2	T–2nd	L NCAA Division II Quarterfinal	10
2015	Valdosta State	9–3	5–2	T–3rd	L NCAA Division II Second Round	14
Valdosta State:		79–27	42–19			
West Georgia Wolves (Gulf South Conference) (2017–2023)
2017	West Georgia	9–4	5–3	T–2nd	L NCAA Division II Second Round	18
2018	West Georgia	10–2	7–1	2nd	L NCAA Division II First Round	16
2019	West Georgia	6–5	4–4	T–4th		
2020–21	No team—COVID-19					
2021	West Georgia	9–3	5–2	3rd	L NCAA Division II Second Round	13
2022	West Georgia	8–2	5–2	3rd		19
2023	West Georgia	6–4	5–3	4th		
West Georgia:		48–20	31–15			
Delta State Statesmen (Gulf South Conference) (2026–present)
2026	Delta State	0–0	0–0			
Delta State:		0–0	0–0			
Total:		127–47				
National championship Conference title Conference division title or championship game berth

=== High school ===
Year	Team	Overall	Conference	Standing	Bowl/playoffs
Lanier County Bulldogs () (2024)
2024	Lanier County	1–7	0–3		
Lanier County:		1–7	0–3		
Total:		1–7			
