= Danny Verpaele =

American football player and coach (born 1985)

Current position
- Title: Safeties coach
- Team: Army
- Conference: AAC

Biographical details
- Born: October 5, 1985 (age 40); Cocoa Beach, Florida, U.S.

Playing career
- 2004–2008: South Florida
- Position: Free safety

Coaching career (HC unless noted)
- 2009: VMI (GA)
- 2010–2012: Jacksonville (DB)
- 2013: Mississippi State (GA)
- 2014–2015: Army (TE/OQC)
- 2016–2018: Valdosta State (DC/LB)
- 2019: Kennesaw State (DB)
- 2020–2022: Kennesaw State (DC/DB)
- 2023–present: Army (S)

Accomplishments and honors

Awards
- Sporting News Third-Team Freshman All-American (2004)

Danny Verpaele (born October 5, 1985) is an American college football coach and former player who serves as the safeties coach for the Army Black Knights. He played as a safety at USF.

== Early life ==
Danny Verpaele was born on October 5, 1985, in Cocoa Beach, Florida.

== Career ==
=== High school ===
Verpaele was a four-year lettermen for the Merritt Island Mustangs. In his junior year (2002–2003), Verpaele led the Mustangs to the regional semifinals, losing to Drew Weatherford-led Land O' Lakes High School 20-14 on November 29, 2002. Verpaele was a Class 4A Second-Team All-State selectee in 2002.
In 2003, his senior year, Verpaele had a standout season, passing for 1,531 yards and rushing for 1,015. Verpaele led the Mustangs to the regional final championship but they fell short, losing 27-0 to Washington High School on December 5, 2003. Verpaele also played defensive back and was voted Brevard County All-Space Coast Defensive Player of the Year by the Florida Today. the Orlando Sentinel voted Verpaele to its All-Central Florida team and he was ranked as the 68th Best Prospect in the state of Florida. In 2003, Verpaele was again voted to the Class 4A All-State Second Team. Verpaele holds the distinction as being the first player in school history to start all four years.

=== College ===
Verpaele played 11 games during in the 2004 season, having 25 solo tackles, and 32 assisted tackles for 57 tackles in total. Verpaele had two sacks, six tackles for a loss of 13 yards, one pass break up, and one fumble recover. Verpaele earned a sporting news' Third-Team Freshman All-American honor. Verpaele did not participate in 2005 due to a broken ankle. Verpaele played 13 games during 2006, doing 26 solo tackles, 13 assisted for a total of 39. Verpaele had a tackle for a loss and an interception against North Carolina Tar Heels, returning it 26 yards. On November 25, 2006, against West Virginia Mountaineers, Verpaele hit Steve Slaton who was running back on the goal line, forcing a fumble. Verpaele's team would beat its highest ranked opponent at that time, beating 24 by 19. Verpaele recorded 5 tackles, broke up 3 passes during the win against East Carolina Pirates in the 2006 PapaJohns.com Bowl.
