= Joe Johnson (American football coach) =

American football coach

Coaching career (HC unless noted)
- 1984–1993: Lees–McRae (assistant)
- 1996–1998: Charleston Southern (assistant)
- 1999–2001: North Greenville
- 2002: Lenoir–Rhyne (assistant)
- 2008: Pikeville (assistant)
- 2009–2010: Pikeville

Head coaching record
- Overall: 10–42

Joe Johnson is an American former college football coach He served as the head football coach at North Greenville University in Tigerville, South Carolina from 1999 to 2001 and the University of Pikeville from 2009 to 2010, compiling a career head coaching record of 10–42.

Johnson was an assistant coach at Charleston Southern University and Boiling Springs High School in Boiling Springs, South Carolina prior to being hired at North Greenville.

== Head coaching record ==
Year	Team	Overall	Conference	Standing	Bowl/playoffs
North Greenville Mounties (Mid-South Conference) (1999–2000)
1999	North Greenville	5–6	5–2	3rd	
2000	North Greenville	0–10	0–8	8th	
North Greenville Crusaders (NAIA independent) (2001)
2001	North Greenville	0–10			
North Greenville:		5–26	5–10		
Pikeville Bears (Mid-South Conference) (2009–2010)
2009	Pikeville	3–8	1–5	6th (East)	
2010	Pikeville	2–8	2–4	5th (East)	
North Greenville:		5–16	3–9		
Total:		10–42			
