= Graham Craig (priest) =

Anglican priest in Ireland

Graham Craig was an Anglican priest in Ireland in the second half of the 19th century and the first decade of the 20th.

Craig was born in Down, County Westmeath and educated at Trinity College, Dublin and ordained in 1858. After curacies in Athboy and Belfast he held incumbencies at Kilmore, Kildalkey and Kilbride. He was Archdeacon of Meath from 1898 to 1900; Dean of Clonmacnoise from 1900 to 1904.
