= 2018 NCAA Division II football season =

American college football season

- Total No. of teams: 167
- Regular season: August 30 – November 10, 2018
- Playoffs: November 17 – December 15, 2018
- National Championship: McKinney Independent School District Stadium; McKinney, TX; December 15, 2018
- Champion: Valdosta State
- Harlon Hill Trophy: Jayru Campbell (QB, Ferris State)

The 2018 NCAA Division II football season, part of college football in the United States organized by the National Collegiate Athletic Association (NCAA) at the Division II level, began on August 30, 2018, and ended with the Division II championship on December 15, 2018, at the McKinney Independent School District Stadium in McKinney, Texas, hosted by the Lone Star Conference. The game was originally scheduled for Children's Mercy Park in Kansas City, Kansas, on the last year of a five-year contract, but that contract was terminated in September 2018 to allow off-season renovation of the field for its primary tenant, professional soccer club Sporting KC.

Valdosta State beat Ferris State, 49–47, for the championship.

== Headlines ==
- October 3 – Long Island University announced that it would merge its two current athletic programs—the LIU Brooklyn Blackbirds, full but non-football members of the Division I FCS Northeast Conference (NEC), and LIU Post Pioneers, full members of the Division II non-football East Coast Conference and football members of the Northeast-10 Conference—effective with the 2019–20 school year. The new program will compete under the LIU name with a new nickname, inheriting the Division I and NEC memberships of LIU Brooklyn. Following the athletic merger, the former Post football team will become the LIU football team, competing in the NEC as an FCS member.

== Division II team wins over FCS teams ==
- September 1: Morehouse 34, Arkansas–Pine Bluff 30
- September 22: Truman State 34, Valparaiso 20

== Conference changes and new programs ==
=== Membership changes ===
School	Former conference	New conference
Cheyney Wolves	PSAC	Dropped program
North Alabama Lions	Gulf South	Independent (FCS)
North Greenville Crusaders	Independent	Gulf South
Tiffin Dragons	GLIAC	G-MAC

== Conference standings ==
=== Super Region 1 ===
2018 Great Midwest Athletic Conference football standings
	Conf.			Overall
Team	W		L	W		L
No. 15 Hillsdale $^	8	–	0	10	–	3
Ohio Dominican	6	–	2	9	–	2
Tiffin	6	–	2	9	–	2
Findlay	6	–	2	8	–	3
Walsh	4	–	4	4	–	6
Alderson Broaddus	3	–	5	4	–	7
Kentucky Wesleyan	2	–	6	3	–	7
Malone	1	–	7	2	–	8
Lake Erie	0	–	8	0	–	11
$ – Conference champion; ^ – NCAA Division II playoff participant; Rankings from AFCA poll

2018 Mountain East Conference football standings
	Conf.			Overall
Team	W		L	W		L
No. 4 Notre Dame (OH) $^	10	–	0	13	–	1
Fairmont State	8	–	2	9	–	2
Shepherd	7	–	3	7	–	3
Charleston (WV)	6	–	4	6	–	5
West Virginia State	5	–	5	6	–	5
Glenville State	5	–	5	5	–	6
Urbana	4	–	6	5	–	6
Virginia–Wise	4	–	6	4	–	6
West Liberty	3	–	7	3	–	8
Concord	2	–	8	2	–	9
West Virginia Wesleyan	1	–	9	1	–	10
$ – Conference champion; ^ – NCAA Division II playoff participant; Rankings from AFCA poll

2018 Northeast-10 Conference football standings
	Conf.			Overall
Team	W		L	W		L
No. 21 LIU Post $^	9	–	0	10	–	1
No. 23 New Haven ^	8	–	1	9	–	3
Pace	6	–	3	7	–	3
Assumption	6	–	3	6	–	4
Merrimack	5	–	4	5	–	5
Bentley	4	–	5	4	–	6
Southern Connecticut	3	–	6	4	–	6
Stonehill	2	–	7	2	–	8
American International	1	–	8	1	–	8
Saint Anselm	1	–	8	1	–	8
$ – Conference champion; ^ – NCAA Division II playoff participant; Rankings from AFCA poll

2018 Pennsylvania State Athletic Conference football standings
	Conf.			Overall
Team	W		L	W		L
East
No. 17 West Chester xy$^	6	–	0	10	–	1
Kutztown ^	5	–	1	9	–	2
Bloomsburg	4	–	2	6	–	5
Shippensburg	3	–	3	6	–	5
Millersville	2	–	4	2	–	9
Lock Haven	1	–	5	2	–	9
East Stroudsburg	0	–	6	2	–	9
West
No. 12 Slippery Rock xy^	7	–	0	11	–	3
IUP	5	–	2	8	–	3
California (PA)	5	–	2	7	–	4
Edinboro	3	–	4	6	–	5
Mercyhurst	3	–	4	5	–	6
Clarion	2	–	5	4	–	7
Gannon	2	–	5	2	–	9
Seton Hill	1	–	6	1	–	10
Championship: West Chester 33, Slippery Rock 10
$ – Conference champion; x – Division champion/co-champions; y – Championship game participant; ^ – NCAA Division II playoff participant; Rankings from AFCA poll

=== Super Region 2 ===
2018 Central Intercollegiate Athletic Association football standings
	Conf.			Overall
Team	W		L	W		L
Northern Division
No. 19 Bowie State xy$^	5	–	1	10	–	3
Virginia Union x	5	–	1	8	–	2
Chowan	4	–	2	6	–	4
Virginia State	3	–	3	4	–	5
Lincoln (PA)	1	–	5	1	–	9
Elizabeth City State	0	–	6	1	–	7
Southern Division
Fayetteville State xy	5	–	1	6	–	3
Shaw	4	–	2	5	–	5
Winston-Salem State	4	–	2	5	–	4
Johnson C. Smith Golden Bulls football	2	–	4	3	–	8
St. Augustine's	2	–	4	2	–	7
Livingstone	1	–	5	3	–	6
Championship: Bowie State 30, Fayetteville State 10
$ – Conference champion; x – Division champion/co-champions; y – Championship game participant; ^ – NCAA Division II playoff participant; Rankings from AFCA poll

2018 Gulf South Conference football standings
	Conf.			Overall
Team	W		L	W		L
No. 1 Valdosta State $^	8	–	0	14	–	0
No. 16 West Georgia ^	7	–	1	10	–	2
Florida Tech ^	5	–	3	8	–	4
West Alabama ^	5	–	3	8	–	4
West Florida	4	–	4	6	–	5
North Greenville	3	–	4	4	–	6
Delta State	2	–	6	2	–	8
Mississippi College	1	–	6	3	–	7
Shorter	0	–	8	0	–	11
$ – Conference champion; ^ – NCAA Division II playoff participant; Rankings from AFCA poll

2018 South Atlantic Conference football standings
	Conf.			Overall
Team	W		L	W		L
No. 8 Lenoir–Rhyne $^	7	–	0	12	–	2
No. 24 Wingate ^	5	–	2	9	–	4
Carson–Newman	4	–	3	7	–	4
Tusculum	4	–	3	5	–	5
Newberry	3	–	4	5	–	6
Mars Hill	3	–	4	4	–	6
Catawba	2	–	5	4	–	7
Limestone	0	–	7	0	–	10
$ – Conference champion; ^ – NCAA Division II playoff participant; Rankings from AFCA Poll

2018 Southern Intercollegiate Athletic Conference football standings
	Conf.			Overall
Team	W		L	W		L
East Division
Albany State xy	6	–	0	7	–	4
Benedict	4	–	2	6	–	3
Morehouse	3	–	3	7	–	3
Clark Atlanta	2	–	4	3	–	7
Fort Valley State	2	–	4	2	–	8
West Division
Miles xy$	4	–	2	5	–	6
Central State (OH)	3	–	3	5	–	5
Tuskegee	3	–	3	5	–	5
Lane	2	–	4	3	–	6
Kentucky State	0	–	6	0	–	10
Championship: Miles 50, Albany State 23
$ – Conference champion; x – Division champion/co-champions; y – Championship game participant

2018 NCAA Division II independents football records
	Conf.			Overall
Team	W		L	W		L
UNC Pembroke		–		2	–	8

=== Super Region 3 ===
2018 Great American Conference football standings
	Conf.			Overall
Team	W		L	W		L
No. 6 Ouachita Baptist $^	11	–	0	12	–	1
No. 20 Harding ^	9	–	2	9	–	3
Southern Arkansas #	8	–	3	8	–	4
SE Oklahoma State	6	–	5	6	–	5
Arkansas–Monticello #	6	–	5	6	–	6
Henderson State	5	–	6	5	–	6
Oklahoma Baptist	5	–	6	5	–	6
NW Oklahoma State	4	–	7	4	–	7
Arkansas Tech	3	–	8	3	–	8
East Central	3	–	8	3	–	8
Southern Nazarene	3	–	8	3	–	8
SW Oklahoma State	3	–	8	3	–	8
$ – Conference champion; ^ – NCAA Division II playoff participant; # – bowl participant (Arkansas–Monticello: Heritage Bowl, Southern Arkansas: Live United Texarkana Bowl; Rankings from AFCA poll

2018 Great Lakes Intercollegiate Athletic Conference football standings
	Conf.			Overall
Team	W		L	W		L
No. 2 Ferris State $^	8	–	0	15	–	1
No. 14 Grand Valley State ^	7	–	1	10	–	2
Ashland	6	–	2	6	–	4
Saginaw Valley State	5	–	3	8	–	3
Davenport *	3	–	5	6	–	5
Northwood	3	–	5	3	–	7
Michigan Tech	2	–	6	4	–	6
Northern Michigan	1	–	7	3	–	8
Wayne State (MI)	1	–	7	2	–	9
$ – Conference champion; ^ – NCAA Division II playoff participant; * – Provisional NCAA Division II member; Rankings from AFCA poll

2018 Great Lakes Valley Conference football standings
	Conf.			Overall
Team	W		L	W		L
No. 11 Indianapolis $^	7	–	0	10	–	2
Missouri S&T #	6	–	1	10	–	2
Truman State	5	–	2	6	–	5
McKendree	4	–	3	6	–	5
Quincy	3	–	4	4	–	7
Lincoln (MO)	2	–	5	3	–	8
William Jewell	1	–	6	1	–	9
Southwest Baptist	0	–	7	0	–	10
$ – Conference champion; ^ – NCAA Division II playoff participant; # – Mineral Water Bowl participant; Rankings from AFCA poll

2018 Mid-America Intercollegiate Athletics Association football standings
	Conf.			Overall
Team	W		L	W		L
No. 10 NW Missouri State +^	9	–	2	10	–	3
No. 22 Fort Hays State +^	9	–	2	9	–	3
Pittsburg State	8	–	3	8	–	3
Central Oklahoma #	7	–	4	8	–	4
Emporia State #	7	–	4	8	–	4
Missouri Western #	6	–	5	7	–	5
Central Missouri	5	–	6	5	–	6
Nebraska–Kearney	5	–	6	5	–	6
Washburn	5	–	6	5	–	6
Lindenwood	4	–	7	4	–	7
Missouri Southern	1	–	10	1	–	10
Northeastern State	0	–	11	0	–	11
$ – Conference champion; ^ – NCAA Division II playoff participant; # – bowl participant (Emporia State: Heritage Bowl, Missouri Western: Live United Texarkana Bowl, Central Oklahoma: C.H.A.M.P.S. Heart of Texas Bowl); Rankings from AFCA Poll

=== Super Region 4 ===
2018 Great Northwest Athletic Conference football standings
	Conf.			Overall
Team	W		L	W		L
Azusa Pacific +^	7	–	1	8	–	4
Central Washington +	7	–	1	8	–	3
Western Oregon	4	–	4	5	–	6
Humboldt State	2	–	6	2	–	8
Simon Fraser	0	–	8	1	–	9
+ – Conference co-champions; ^ – NCAA Division II playoff participant; Rankings from AFCA poll

2018 Lone Star Conference football standings
	Conf.			Overall
Team	W		L	W		L
No. 5 Tarleton State $^	8	–	0	12	–	1
No. 9 Texas A&M–Commerce ^	7	–	1	10	–	3
No. 25 Midwestern State	6	–	2	8	–	2
Angelo State #	4	–	4	6	–	6
West Texas A&M	4	–	4	6	–	5
Eastern New Mexico	4	–	4	5	–	6
Texas A&M–Kingsville	2	–	6	4	–	7
UT Permian Basin	1	–	7	2	–	9
Western New Mexico	0	–	8	0	–	10
$ – Conference champion; ^ – NCAA Division II playoff participant; # – C.H.A.M.P.S. Heart of Texas Bowl participant; Rankings from AFCA poll

2018 Northern Sun Intercollegiate Conference football standings
	Conf.				Overall
Team	W		L		W		L
North Division
No. 13 Minnesota–Duluth +^	11	–	0		11	–	1
Minnesota State–Moorhead #	8	–	3		8	–	4
Bemidji State	7	–	4		7	–	4
St. Cloud State	7	–	4		7	–	4
Northern State	4	–	7		4	–	7
Mary	1	–	10		1	–	10
Minnesota–Crookston	1	–	10		1	–	10
Minot State	1	–	10		1	–	10
South Division
No. 3 Minnesota State +^	11	–	0		13	–	1
Winona State	8	–	3		8	–	3
Sioux Falls	7	–	4		7	–	4
Augustana (SD)	7	–	4		7	–	4
Concordia–St. Paul	5	–	6		5	–	6
SW Minnesota State	–	4	–	7	4	–	7
Wayne State (NE)	3	–	8		3	–	8
Upper Iowa	3	–	8		3	–	8
+ – Conference co-champions; ^ – NCAA Division II playoff participant; # – Mineral Water Bowl participant; Rankings from AFCA poll

2018 Rocky Mountain Athletic Conference football standings
	Conf.			Overall
Team	W		L	W		L
No. 7 CSU Pueblo +^	9	–	1	11	–	2
No. 18 Colorado Mines +^	9	–	1	10	–	2
Chadron State	7	–	3	7	–	3
Dixie State	7	–	3	7	–	4
Colorado Mesa	6	–	4	7	–	4
South Dakota Mines	4	–	6	5	–	6
Adams State	4	–	6	4	–	7
New Mexico Highlands	4	–	6	4	–	7
Black Hills State	2	–	8	3	–	8
Western Colorado	2	–	8	2	–	9
Fort Lewis	1	–	9	1	–	9
+ – Conference co-champions; ^ – NCAA Division II playoff participant; Rankings from AFCA poll

== Postseason ==
2018 NCAA Division II Football Championship
- Teams: 28
- Finals Site: McKinney Independent School District Stadium; McKinney, Texas
- Champion: Valdosta State; (4th title, 5th title game)
- Runner-up: Ferris State; (1st title game)
- Semifinalists: Minnesota State; Notre Dame (OH)
- Winning coach: Kerwin Bell; 1st championship

The 2018 NCAA Division II Football Championship was the 46th edition of the Division II playoffs. The playoffs began on November 17 and concluded with the championship game on December 15.

The field consisted of 28 teams, seven from each of the four super regions. The participants in each region were determined by the regional rankings; if a conference's highest-ranked team was ranked in the top nine, that team qualified via the "earned access" provision, and all other participants were selected directly from the rankings. The top seed in each region received a first-round bye. After the quarterfinals, the regional winners were reseeded one through four, with No. 1 meeting No. 4 in the semifinals and No. 2 meeting No. 3.

=== Participating teams ===
School	Conference	Regular Season Record	Region	Seed
Azusa Pacific	Great Northwest Athletic Conference	8–3	4	7
Bowie State	Central Intercollegiate Athletic Association	9–2	2	4
Colorado Mines	Rocky Mountain Athletic Conference	10–1	4	4
CSU Pueblo	Rocky Mountain Athletic Conference	10–1	4	5
Ferris State	Great Lakes Intercollegiate Athletic Conference	11–0	3	2
Florida Tech	Gulf South Conference	8–3	2	6
Fort Hays State	Mid-America Intercollegiate Athletics Association	9–2	3	5
Grand Valley State	Great Lakes Intercollegiate Athletic Conference	10–1	3	3
Harding	Great American Conference	9–2	3	7
Hillsdale	Great Midwest Athletic Conference	9–2	1	5
Indianapolis	Great Lakes Valley Conference	9–1	3	4
Kutztown	Pennsylvania State Athletic Conference	9–1	1	4
Lenoir–Rhyne	South Atlantic Conference	10–1	2	3
LIU Post	Northeast-10 Conference	10–0	1	2
Minnesota State	Northern Sun Intercollegiate Conference	11–0	4	1
Minnesota–Duluth	Northern Sun Intercollegiate Conference	11–0	4	3
New Haven	Northeast-10 Conference	8–2	1	6
Northwest Missouri State	Mid-America Intercollegiate Athletics Association	9–2	3	6
Notre Dame (OH)	Mountain East Conference	11–0	1	1
Ouachita Baptist	Great American Conference	11–0	3	1
Slippery Rock	Pennsylvania State Athletic Conference	9–2	1	7
Tarleton State	Lone Star Conference	10–0	4	2
Texas A&M–Commerce	Lone Star Conference	9–2	4	6
Valdosta State	Gulf South Conference	10–0	2	1
West Alabama	Gulf South Conference	8–3	2	5
West Chester	Pennsylvania State Athletic Conference	10–0	1	3
West Georgia	Gulf South Conference	10–1	2	2
Wingate	South Atlantic Conference	8–3	2	7

=== Bids by conference ===
Conference	Total	Schools	Super Region
Central Intercollegiate Athletic Association	1	Bowie State	2
Great American Conference	2	Harding; Ouachita Baptist	3
Great Lakes Intercollegiate Athletic Conference	2	Ferris State; Grand Valley State	3
Great Lakes Valley Conference	1	Indianapolis	3
Great Midwest Athletic Conference	1	Hillsdale	1
Great Northwest Athletic Conference	1	Azusa Pacific	4
Gulf South Conference	4	Florida Tech; Valdosta State; West Alabama; West Georgia	2
Lone Star Conference	2	Tarleton State; Texas A&M–Commerce	4
Mid-America Intercollegiate Athletics Association	2	Fort Hays State; Northwest Missouri State	3
Mountain East Conference	1	Notre Dame (OH)	1
Northeast-10 Conference	2	LIU Post; New Haven	1
Northern Sun Intercollegiate Conference	2	Minnesota State; Minnesota–Duluth	4
Pennsylvania State Athletic Conference	3	Kutztown; Slippery Rock; West Chester	1
Rocky Mountain Athletic Conference	2	Colorado Mines; CSU Pueblo	4
South Atlantic Conference	2	Lenoir–Rhyne; Wingate	2

=== Bracket ===
First round November 17	Second round November 24
1	Notre Dame (OH)*	19
5	Hillsdale	14
4	Kutztown*	26
5	Hillsdale	40
Super Region 1
2	LIU Post*	14
7	Slippery Rock	20
7	Slippery Rock	59
6	New Haven*	20
3	West Chester*	28
6	New Haven	35
1	Valdosta State*	66
4	Bowie State	16
4	Bowie State*	41
5	West Alabama	35
Super Region 2
2	West Georgia*	21
7	Wingate	41
7	Wingate	17
3	Lenoir–Rhyne*	21
3	Lenoir–Rhyne*	43
6	Florida Tech	21
1	Ouachita Baptist*	35
4	Indianapolis	7
4	Indianapolis*	38
5	Fort Hays State	27
Super Region 3
2	Ferris State*	21
7	Harding	19
2	Ferris State*	27
6	NW Missouri State	21
3	Grand Valley State*	17
6	NW Missouri State	42
1	Minnesota State*	24
5	CSU Pueblo	10
4	Colorado Mines*	17
5	CSU Pueblo	37
Super Region 4
2	Tarleton State*	58
7	Azusa Pacific	0
2	Tarleton State*	34
6	Texas A&M–Commerce	28
3	Minnesota–Duluth*	17
6	Texas A&M–Commerce	33

Quarterfinals; December 1
1	Notre Dame (OH)*	21
7	Slippery Rock	17
1	Valdosta State*	61
3	Lenoir–Rhyne	21
1	Ouachita Baptist*	14
2	Ferris State	37
1	Minnesota State*	13
2	Tarleton State	10

Semifinals; December 8
4	Notre Dame (OH)	24
1	Valdosta State*	30
3	Ferris State	42
2	Minnesota State*	25

Championship; McKinney, TX; December 15
1	Valdosta State	49
3	Ferris State	47

== See also ==
- 2018 NCAA Division II football rankings
- 2018 NCAA Division I FBS football season
- 2018 NCAA Division I FCS football season
- 2018 NCAA Division III football season
- 2018 NAIA football season
