= Graham Craig (American football) =

American football coach (born 1991)

Current position
- Title: Head coach
- Team: Valdosta State
- Conference: GSC
- Record: 6–5

Biographical details
- Born: September 14, 1991 (age 35); Birmingham, Alabama, U.S.
- Education: LaGrange College (2014)

Playing career
- 2010–2011: Murray State
- 2012: Valdosta State
- 2013–2014: LaGrange
- Position: Quarterback

Coaching career (HC unless noted)
- 2015: Samford (OQC)
- 2016: Arizona State (QB GA)
- 2017: Nevada (OQC)
- 2018: West Georgia (QB)
- 2019–2022: West Georgia (OC)
- 2023: Memphis (SR OA/QB)
- 2024: Valdosta State (OC)
- 2025–present: Valdosta State

Administrative career (AD unless noted)
- 2018: Samford (dir. of football ops)

Head coaching record
- Overall: 6–5
- Tournaments: 0–1 (NCAA D-II playoffs)

Accomplishments and honors

Championships
- 1 GSC (2025)

Awards
- Second-team All-USA South (2013); GSC Co-Coach of the Year (2025)

Graham Andrew Craig (born September 14, 1991) is an American college football coach. He is the head football coach for Valdosta State University, a position he has held since 2025. Craig has also coached for Samford, Arizona State, Nevada, West Georgia and Memphis. He played college football for Murray State, Valdosta State and LaGrange College as a quarterback.

== Head coaching record ==
Year	Team	Overall	Conference	Standing	Bowl/playoffs
Valdosta State Blazers (Gulf South Conference) (2025–present)
2025	Valdosta State	6–5	2–1	T–1st	L NCAA Division II First Round
2026	Valdosta State	0–0	0–0		
Valdosta State:		6–5	2–1		
Total:		6–5			
National championship Conference title Conference division title or championship game berth
