= 2018 NCAA Division II Football Championship Game =

2018 NCAA Division II Football Championship
Ferris State Bulldogs	Valdosta State Blazers
(14–1)	(13–0)
Great Lakes	Gulf South
47	49
Head coach: Tony Annese	Head coach: Kerwin Bell
Seed 3	Seed 1
	1	2	3	4	Total
Ferris State	10	14	14	9	47
Valdosta State	7	21	14	7	49
- Date: December 15, 2018
- Season: 2018
- Stadium: McKinney ISD Stadium
- Location: McKinney, Texas
- Referee: Brad Carrell
- Attendance: 4,306

United States TV coverage
- Network: ESPNU

The 2018 NCAA Division II Football Championship Game was a postseason college football game that determined a national champion in NCAA Division II for the 2018 season. It was played at McKinney ISD Stadium in McKinney, Texas, on December 15, 2018, with kickoff at 4:00 p.m. EST (3:00 p.m. local CST), and television coverage on ESPNU.

== Teams ==
The participants of the 2018 NCAA Division II Football Championship Game were the finalists of the 2018 Division II Playoffs, which began with four 7-team brackets to determine super region champions, who then qualified for the national semifinals. The game featured the winners of those national semifinal games: No. 3 seed Ferris State and No. 1 seed Valdosta State. This was the first meeting between the two teams. This was Ferris State's first championship game appearance, and Valdosta State's fourth; the Blazers were 3–1 in previous appearances.

=== National semifinals ===
Super region champions were seeded 1 to 4 for the national semifinals.

Semifinals; December 8 Hosted by higher seeded team
1	Valdosta State	30
4	Notre Dame (OH)	24
2	Minnesota State	25
3	Ferris State	42

National Championship; December 15; McKinney ISD Stadium, McKinney, TX
1	Valdosta State	49
3	Ferris State	47

== Game summary ==
2018 NCAA Division II Football Championship Game

Quarter	1	2	3	4	Total
No. 3 Ferris State	10	14	14	9	47
No. 1 Valdosta State	7	21	14	7	49

at McKinney ISD Stadium • McKinney, Texas

- Date: Saturday, December 15, 2018
- Game time: 4:00 p.m. EST (3:00 p.m. CST)
- Game weather: Mostly sunny • Temperature: 59 °F (15 °C) • Wind: NW 11 mph
- Game attendance: 4,306
- Referee: Brad Carrell
- TV: ESPNU

Game information

First Quarter

- (10:19) FSU – Jevon Shaw 80 yard pass to Keyondre Craig, Jackson Dieterle kick (Drive: 1 play, 80 yards, 0:13; Ferris State 7–0)
- (5:23) VAL – Rogan Wells 21 yard pass to Lio'undre Gallimore, Andrew Gray kick (Drive: 11 plays, 75 yards, 4:56; Tied 7–7)
- (2:18) FSU – Jackson Dieterle 52 yard field goal (Drive: 6 plays, 8 yards, 2:59; Ferris State 10–7)

Second Quarter

- (14:02) VAL – Rogan Wells 9 yard pass to Kenny Benjamin, Andrew Gray kick (Drive: 8 plays, 75 yards, 3:16; Valdosta State 14–10)
- (10:52) FSU – Jayru Campbell 3 yard rush, Jackson Dieterle kick (Drive: 2 plays, 13 yards, 0:28; Ferris State 17–14)
- (10:06) VAL – Rogan Wells 66 yard pass to Lio'undre Gallimore, Andrew Gray kick (Drive: 2 plays, 70 yards, 0:40; Valdosta State 21–17)
- (5:09) FSU – Davontae Harrington 8 yard rush, Jackson Dieterle kick (Drive: 11 plays, 75 yards, 4:57; Ferris State 24–21)
- (0:02) VAL – Seth McGill 1 yard rush, Andrew Gray kick (Drive: 12 plays, 63 yards, 5:02; Valdosta State 28–24)

Third Quarter

- (9:49) FSU – Marvin Campbell 2 yard rush, Jackson Dieterle kick (Drive: 12 plays, 85 yards, 5:06; Ferris State 31–28)
- (6:28) VAL – Rogan Wells 16 yard pass to Joe Fortson, Andrew Gray kick (Drive: 7 plays, 68 yards, 3:14; Valdosta State 35–31)
- (4:25) VAL – Rogan Wells 1 yard pass to Travis Taylor, Andrew Gray kick (Drive: 2 plays, 8 yards, 0:49; Valdosta State 42–31)
- (1:37) FSU – Jayru Campbell 13 yard pass to Keyondre Craig, Jackson Dieterle kick (Drive: 9 plays, 92 yards, 2:41; Valdosta State 42–38)

Fourth Quarter

- (11:36) VAL – Ivory Durham 25 yard pass to Rogan Wells, Andrew Gray kick (Drive: 10 plays, 71 yards, 4:56; Valdosta State 49–38)
- (5:31) FSU – Jackson Dieterle 31 yard field goal (Drive: 10 plays, 50 yards, 3:24; Valdosta State 49–41)
- (0:40) FSU – Sy Barnett 5 yard rush, 2-point pass failed (Drive: 5 plays, 66 yards, 1:37; Valdosta State 49–47)

=== Statistics ===
Statistics	FSU	VAL
First downs	26	27
Plays–yards	67–449	75–496
Rushes–yards	48–270	42–122
Passing yards	179	374
Passing: Comp–Att–Int	11–19–1	20–33–0
Time of possession	27:10	32:50

Team	Category	Player	Statistics
Ferris State	Passing	Jayru Campbell	10/18, 99 yards, 1 TD, 1 INT
Ferris State	Rushing	Jayru Campbell	22 carries, 122 yards, 1 TD
Ferris State	Receiving	Keyondre Craig	3 receptions, 89 yards, 2 TD
Valdosta State	Passing	Rogan Wells	19/31, 349 yards, 5 TD
Valdosta State	Rushing	Jamar Thompkins	16 carries, 72 yards
Valdosta State	Receiving	Lio'undre Gallimore	4 receptions, 111 yards, 2 TD
