= 2018 NCAA Division II football rankings =

- Season: 2018
- Postseason: Single-elimination
- Preseason No. 1: Texas A&M–Commerce
- National champions: Valdosta State
- Conference with most teams in final AFCA poll: LSC (3)

The 2018 NCAA Division II football rankings are from the American Football Coaches Association (AFCA). This is for the 2018 season.

== Legend ==
	Increase in ranking
	Decrease in ranking
	Not ranked previous week or no change
	Selected for College Football Playoff
(#–#)	Win–loss record
(Italics)	Number of first place votes
т	Tied with team above or below also with this symbol

== American Football Coaches Association poll ==
	Preseason	Week 1 Sep 3	Week 2 Sep 10	Week 3 Sep 17	Week 4 Sept 24	Week 5 Oct 1	Week 6 Oct 8	Week 7 Oct 15	Week 8 Oct 22	Week 9 Oct 29	Week 10 Nov 5	
1.	Texas A&M–Commerce 13	Texas A&M–Commerce (1–0) 21	Texas A&M–Commerce (2–0)	Texas A&M–Commerce (3–0)	Minnesota State (4–0) 26	Minnesota State (5–0)	Minnesota State (6–0)	Minnesota State (7–0)	Minnesota State (8–0)	Minnesota State (9–0)	Minnesota State (10–0)	1.
2.	West Florida 14	West Florida (1–0) 6	Minnesota State (2–0)	Minnesota State (3–0)	IUP (4–0) 5	Grand Valley State (5–0)	Grand Valley State (6–0)	Ferris State (7–0)	Ferris State (8–0)	Ferris State (9–0)	Ferris State (10–0)	2.
3.	Minnesota State 2	Minnesota State (1–0) 4	IUP (2–0)	IUP (3–0)	Grand Valley State (4–0)	Ferris State (5–0)	Ferris State (6–0)	West Georgia (7–0)	West Georgia (8–0)	West Georgia (9–0)	West Georgia (10–0)	3.
4.	IUP 2	IUP (1–0) 1	Northwest Missouri State (2–0)	Northwest Missouri State (3–0)	Ferris State (4–0) 2	MSU Texas (5–0)	West Georgia (6–0)	Ouachita Baptist (7–0)	Ouachita Baptist (8–0)	Ouachita Baptist (9–0)	Ouachita Baptist (10–0)	4.
5.	Fort Hays State т	Fort Hays State (1–0)	Grand Valley State (2–0)	Grand Valley State (3–0)	MSU Texas (4–0)	West Georgia (5–0)	Ouachita Baptist (6–0)	Minnesota–Duluth (7–0)	Minnesota–Duluth (8–0)	Minnesota–Duluth (9–0)	Valdosta State (9–0)	5.
6.	Northwest Missouri State 2 т	Northwest Missouri State (1–0)	Ferris State (2–0)	Ferris State (3–0)	West Georgia (4–0)	Ouachita Baptist (5–0)	Minnesota–Duluth (6–0)	Colorado Mines (7–0)	Colorado Mines (8–0)	Colorado Mines (9–0)	Minnesota–Duluth (10–0)	6.
7.	Harding	Harding (1–0) 1	MSU Texas (2–0)	MSU Texas (3–0)	Ouachita Baptist (4–0)	Minnesota–Duluth (5–0)	Texas A&M–Commerce (5–1)	Valdosta State (7–0)	Valdosta State (7–0)	Valdosta State (8–0)	Tarleton State (9–0)	7.
8.	Ferris State	Grand Valley State (1–0)	West Alabama (2–0)	West Georgia (3–0)	Minnesota–Duluth (4–0)	Pittsburg State (5–0)	Valdosta State (6–0)	Grand Valley State (6–1)	Tarleton State (7–0)	Tarleton State (8–0)	Grand Valley State (9–1)	8.
9.	Central Washington	Ferris State (1–0)	CSU Pueblo (2–0)	Ouachita Baptist (3–0)	Texas A&M–Commerce (3–1)	Texas A&M–Commerce (4–1)	Colorado Mines (6–0)	Tarleton State (6–0)	Grand Valley State (7–1)	Grand Valley State (8–1)	West Chester (9–0)	9.
10.	Grand Valley State	MSU Texas (1–0)	West Georgia (2–0)	West Florida (2–1)	Pittsburg State (4–0)	Valdosta State (5–0)	West Florida (5–1)	MSU Texas (6–1)	MSU Texas (6–1)	Northwest Missouri State (8–1)	Colorado State–Pueblo (9–1)	10.
11.	MSU Texas	West Alabama (1–0)	Winona State (2–0)	Minnesota–Duluth (3–0)	West Florida (3–1)	West Florida (4–1)	West Chester (5–0)	Northwest Missouri State (6–1)	Northwest Missouri State (7–1)	West Chester (8–0)	Notre Dame (OH) (10–0)	11.
12.	West Alabama	CSU Pueblo (1–0)	Ohio Dominican (2–0)	Central Washington (2–1)	West Chester (4–0)	Colorado Mines (5–0)	MSU Texas (5–1)	West Chester (6–0)	West Chester (7–0)	Colorado State–Pueblo (8–1)	Indianapolis (8–1)	12.
13.	Indianapolis	West Georgia (1–0)	West Florida (1–1)	West Chester (3–0)	Valdosta State (4–0)	West Chester (5–0)	Northwest Missouri State (5–1)	Colorado State–Pueblo (6–1)	Colorado State–Pueblo (7–1)	Notre Dame (OH) (9–0)	LIU Post (9–0)	13.
14.	CSU Pueblo	Sioux Falls (1–0)	Ouachita Baptist (2–0)	Colorado Mesa (3–0)	Central Washington (3–1) т	IUP (4–1)	Colorado State–Pueblo (5–1)	Notre Dame (OH) (7–0)	Notre Dame (OH) (8–0)	Indianapolis (7–1)	Texas A&M–Commerce (8–2)	14.
15.	Ashland	Winona State (1–0)	Central Washington (1–1)	Pittsburg State (3–0)	Colorado Mines (4–0) т	Colorado State–Pueblo (4–1)	Southern Arkansas (6–0)	Kutztown (6–0)	Kutztown (7–0)	Tiffin (9–0)	Colorado Mines (9–1)	15.
16.	Shepherd	Central Washington (0–1)	Minnesota–Duluth (2–0)	Valdosta State (3–0)	Colorado State–Pueblo (3–1)	Northwest Missouri State (4–1)	Tarleton State (5–0)	Indianapolis (5–1)	Indianapolis (6–1)	Texas A&M–Commerce (7–2)	MSU Texas (7–2)	16.
17.	Assumption	Ohio Dominican (1–0)	Fort Hays State (1–1)	Colorado Mines (3–0)	Northwest Missouri State (3–1)	Southern Arkansas (5–0)	Notre Dame (OH) (6–0)	Tiffin (7–0)	Tiffin (8–0)	LIU Post (8–0)	Lenoir–Rhyne (9–1)	17.
18.	Central Missouri	Ashland (0–1)	West Chester (2–0)	Fort Hays State (2–1)	Fort Hays State (3–1)	Fort Hays State (4–1)	Pittsburg State (5–1)	Texas A&M–Commerce (5–2)	Texas A&M–Commerce (6–2)	MSU Texas (6–2)	Central Washington (8–2)	18.
19.	West Georgia	Findlay (1–0) т	Colorado Mesa (2–0)	Harding (2–1) т	Southern Arkansas (4–0)	Harding (4–1)	Kutztown (5–0)	West Florida (5–2)	LIU Post (7–0)	Central Washington (7–2)	Northwest Missouri State (8–2)	19.
20.	Sioux Falls	Ouachita Baptist (1–0) т	Central Missouri (1–1)	Central Missouri (2–1) т	Harding (3–1)	Notre Dame (OH) (5–0)	Indianapolis (4–1)	LIU Post (6–0)	Central Washington (6–2)	Southern Arkansas (8–1)	Hillsdale (9–1)	20.
21.	Winona State	Central Missouri (0–1)	Harding (1–1)	Southern Arkansas (3–0)	West Alabama (3–1)	Tarleton State (5–0)	Central Washington (4–2)	Central Washington (5–2)	Southern Arkansas (7–1)	Lenoir–Rhyne (8–1)	Kutztown (8–1)	21.
22.	Carson–Newman	Indianapolis (0–1)	Indianapolis (1–1)	Colorado State–Pueblo (2–1)	Indianapolis (2–1)	Indianapolis (3–1)	Tiffin (6–0)	Southern Arkansas (6–1)	IUP (6–2)	IUP (7–2)	Fort Hays State (8–2)	22.
23.	Ohio Dominican	West Chester (1–0)	Pittsburg State (2–0)	West Alabama (2–1)	Notre Dame (OH) (4–0)	West Alabama (3–2)	IUP (4–2)	IUP (5–2)	Harding (6–2)	Kutztown (7–1)	IUP (8–2)	23.
24.	Ouachita Baptist	Minnesota–Duluth (1–0)	Sioux Falls (1–1)	Azusa Pacific (3–0)	Colorado Mesa (3–1)	Azusa Pacific (4–1)	Harding (4–2)	Harding (5–2)	Lenoir–Rhyne (7–1)	Harding (7–2)	Tiffin (9–1)	24.
25.	Findlay	Colorado Mesa (1–0)	Southern Arkansas (2–0)	Indianapolis (1–1)	Tarleton State (4–0)	Central Washington (3–2)	LIU Post (5–0)	Ohio Dominican (6–1)	Hillsdale (7–1)	Hillsdale (8–1)	Harding (8–2)	25.
	Preseason	Week 1 Sep 3	Week 2 Sep 10	Week 3 Sep 17	Week 4 Sept 24	Week 5 Oct 1	Week 6 Oct 8	Week 7 Oct 15	Week 8 Oct 22	Week 9 Oct 29	Week 10 Nov 5	
		Dropped: 16 Shepherd; 17 Assumption; 22 Carson–Newman	Dropped: 18 Ashland; 19 Findlay	Dropped: 11 Winona State; 12 Ohio Dominican; 24 Sioux Falls	Dropped: 20 Central Missouri; 24 Azusa Pacific	Dropped: 24 Colorado Mesa	Dropped: 18 Fort Hays State; 23 West Alabama; 24 Azusa Pacific	Dropped: 18 Pittsburg State	Dropped: 19 West Florida; 25 Ohio Dominican	None	Dropped: 20 Southern Arkansas	
