= Florida Tech Panthers football =

Intercollegiate American Football Team

- First season: 2013
- Last season: 2019; 7 years ago
- Location: Melbourne, Florida
- Stadium: Florida Tech Panther Stadium (capacity: 4,989)
- NCAA division: Division II
- Conference: Gulf South Conference
- Colors: Red and silver
- All-time record: 44–35 (.557)
- Bowl record: 1–0 (1.000)
- Rivalries: West Florida
- Mascot: Pete The Panther

The Florida Tech Panthers football program was the intercollegiate American football team for the Florida Institute of Technology located in the U.S. state of Florida. The team competed in the NCAA Division II and was a member of the Gulf South Conference. Florida Tech's first football team was fielded in 2013, and the final team was fielded in 2019. Steve Englehart was the first and only head coach.

In May 2020, Florida Tech shut down its football program due to budget cuts that followed the COVID-19 pandemic.

== Program achievements ==
Gulf South Conference Champions	
NCAA Division II Team Playoff Participants	2016, 2018
NCAA Division II Regional Championships	
NCAA Division II National Championships	

== Venues ==
The team played its home games in Florida Tech Panther Stadium at Palm Bay High School in Melbourne, Florida. In July 2015, Florida Tech bought naming rights to the stadium; prior to this, the facility was known as Pirate Stadium.

== All-time record vs. current Gulf South Conference opponents ==
Official record (including any NCAA-imposed vacates and forfeits) against all current GSC opponents:

Opponent	Won	Lost	Percentage	Streak	First
Delta State	3	4	.429	Lost 1	2013
Mississippi College	5	1	.833	Lost 1	2014
North Greenville	3	1	.750	Won 3	2016
Shorter	7	0	1.000	Won 7	2013
Valdosta State	1	6	.143	Lost 3	2013
West Alabama	3	4	.429	Lost 2	2013
West Florida	1	3	.250	Lost 1	2016
West Georgia	3	4	.429	Won 1	2013
Totals	26	23	.531		

=== All-time record vs. non-conference opponents ===
School	Record	First	Last
Alderson-Broaddus	1–0	2013	2013
Ave Maria	1–1	2013	2014
Benedict	1–0	2018	2018
Bethune-Cookman	0–1	2014	2014
Fort Valley State	2–1	2015	2019
Lenoir-Rhyne	0–1	2018	2018
McNeese State	0–1	2017	2017
Newberry	3–2	2013	2019
North Alabama$	0–4	2013	2017
Presbyterian	1–0	2016	2016
Savannah State	1–0	2019	2019
Southeastern Louisiana	0–1	2015	2015
Stetson	2–0	2013	2014
Tarleton State	1–0	2014	2014
Virginia–Lynchburg	1–0	2017	2017
Warner	2–0	2013	2015
Webber International	1–0	2013	2013
Wingate	1–0	2018	2018

$ North Alabama was a member of the Gulf South Conference for the matchups between 2013 and 2017

=== All-time record vs. ranked opponents ===
Florida Tech was 6–16 all-time against ranked opponents with two of those wins coming against Top 5 teams in the 2015 season, at #5 Delta State and at home against #1 West Georgia. Two of the losses were to ranked FCS teams, in 2014 at Bethune-Cookman and 2015 at Southeast Louisiana. The Panthers won at least one game against a ranked opponent in every season between 2014 and 2018.

Season	Date	Opponent	Ranking	Result
2013	September 19, 2013	West Alabama	#16	L 3–45
2013	October 5, 2013	at Valdosta State	#1	L 14–52
2013	November 9, 2013	North Alabama	#24	L 28–55
2014	September 20, 2014	^ Tarleton State	#12	W 37–31
2014	September 27, 2014	at Bethune-Cookman	#15 (FCS)	L 33–34
2014	October 2, 2014	Delta State	#11	L 20–58
2014	October 18, 2014	North Alabama	#4	L 31–34
2014	November 15, 2014	Valdosta State	#25	L 29–31
2015	September 12, 2015	at Southeastern Louisiana	#18 (FCS)	L 17–28
2015	September 26, 2015	at North Alabama	#8	L 48–55
2015	October 3, 2015	at Delta State	#5	W 41–37
2015	November 7, 2015	West Georgia	#1	W 28–26
2015	November 14, 2015	at Valdosta State	#18	L 21–39
2016	October 29, 2016	Valdosta State	#14	W 38–20
2017	October 21, 2017	West Alabama	#18	W 41–39
2017	November 4, 2017	West Georgia	#25	L 13–20
2018	September 22, 2018	at West Georgia	#8	L 21–30
2018	October 13, 2018	Valdosta State	#8	L 21–51
2018	October 20, 2018	at West Florida	#17	W 30–28
2018	November 17, 2018	&at Lenoir-Rhyne	#17	L 21–43
2019	October 19, 2019	at Valdosta State	#1	L 28–55
2019	October 26, 2019	West Florida	#20	L 14–38

^ game was played at AT&T Stadium in Arlington, TX

& playoff game

== Rivalries ==
=== West Florida ===
Florida Tech played West Florida each year in the Coastal Classic, a matchup of the only Division II football programs in the state of Florida. The winner was awarded the Coastal Classic Trophy. The trophy stands 24 inches tall on a six-inch wooden base. It features a large bronze anchor and a 6-pointed ship's wheel with nautical sailing rope as the focal point of the trophy. A small bell is attached to the anchor with a white segment of sailing rope attached to its clapper.

West Florida won the series' first installment during their inaugural season of 2016, upsetting the 16th ranked Panthers, 42–39 in Pensacola. The following year in Melbourne, a controversial intentional grounding penalty against Florida Tech on fourth down on what would have been the game's final play gave West Florida the ball for one play to attempt and convert a 44-yard field goal for a 23–21 victory. Florida Tech got its revenge along with its first ever win against West Florida in memorable fashion in 2018, rallying from a 21–3 first-half deficit to score 27 straight points and hold on to beat the 17th ranked Argonauts, 30–28.

=== All-time records versus rivals ===
Team	Name	Trophy	Active	Games played	First meeting	Last meeting	FIT wins	FIT losses	Win Pct.
West Florida	✓	✓	✓	4	2016	2019 Lost 14–38	1	3	.250

== Individual awards and honors ==
=== All-Americans ===
Florida Tech has had 18 players honored as All-Americans. To date, Adonis Davis is the only AP First Team All-American and J.T. Hassell is the only AFCA First Team All-American.

- J.T. Hassell – Linebacker, 2018 (American Football Coaches Association, D2CCA, Don Hansen Committee) First Team, (Associated Press, D2Football.com) Second Team
- Adonis Davis – Defensive Lineman, 2018 (D2football.com) Honorable Mention, 2017 (AP, Street & Smith's) First Team, (AFCA) Second Team, (D2Football.com) Honorable Mention
- Romell Guerrier – Wide Receiver, 2018 (Don Hansen Committee) Honorable Mention
- Antwuan Haynes – Running Back, 2016 (Don Hansen Committee) Honorable Mention, 2015 (USA College Football) Freshman Team
- Kenny Johnston – Tight End, 2016 (AFCA, Don Hansen Committee, D2CCA), 2015 (Don Hansen Committee, USA College Football)
- Chris Stapleton - Linebacker, 2016 (Don Hansen Committee) Third Team
- Gabe Hughes – Tight End, 2015 (D2Football.com) Honorable Mention, 2014 (Don Hansen Committee) Third Team
- J.J. Sanders – Linebacker, 2015 (Don Hansen Committee, USA College Football), 2014 (Don Hansen Committee, USA College Football) Third Team
- T.J. Lowder – Wide Receiver, 2015 (USA College Football) Second Team
- Kevin Delgado – Right Guard, 2015 (USA College Football) First Team
- Manny Abad – Cornerback, 2015 (USA College Football) Second Team
- Leo Alba II – Cornerback, 2015 (USA College Football) Second Team
- Matt Garcia – Left Tackle, 2015 (USA College Football) Honorable Mention , 2014 (USA College Football) Honorable Mention
- Blake Stone – Center, 2015 (USA College Football) Second Team
- Xavier Milton – Wide Receiver, 2014 (Daktronics, D2Football.com, Don Hansen Committee, USA College Football) First Team
- Mark Cato – Quarterback, 2014 (USA College Football) Freshman Team
- Trevor Sand – Running Back, 2014 (USA College Football) Third Team
- Ramsey Sellers – Center, 2014 (USA College Football) Third Team

=== Conference honors ===
- Gulf South Conference Coach of the Year

2015: Steve Englehart
2014: Steve Englehart

- Gulf South Conference Offensive Player of the Year

2014: WR Xavier Milton

- Gulf South Conference Defensive Player of the Year

2018: LB J.T. Hassell
2015: LB J.J. Sanders

- Gulf South Conference Offensive Freshman of the Year

2015: RB Antwuan Haynes
2014: QB Mark Cato

- Gulf South Conference Defensive Freshman of the Year

2013: LB Chris Stapleton

== Notable former players ==
- Manny Abad: Cornerback Tennessee Titans Preseason/Practice Squad (2017)
- Dean Faithfull: Kicker, Canadian Football League
- J.T. Hassell: NFL Safety (2019–2020)
- Gabe Hughes: Tight End, Miami Dolphins Practice Squad (2016)
- Jiya Wright: Quarterback, Sioux Falls Storm

== Year-by-year results ==
Statistics correct as of the 2018–19 college football season

NCAA Division I champions	NCAA Division I FCS champions	NCAA Division II champions	Conference champions	Division champions	Bowl Eligible	Undefeated Season

Year	NCAA Division	Conference	Overall					Conference						Coach
Year	NCAA Division	Conference	Games	Win	Loss	Tie	Pct.	Games	Win	Loss	Tie	Pct.	Standing	Coach
2013	NCAA Division II	Gulf South	12	5	7	0	.417	6	1	5	0	.167	6th	Steve Englehart
2014	NCAA Division II	Gulf South	11	6	5	0	.545	7	3	4	0	.429	5th	Steve Englehart
2015	NCAA Division II	Gulf South	11	7	4	0	.636	7	5	2	0	.714	T-2nd	Steve Englehart
2016	NCAA Division II	Gulf South	11	8	3	0	.727	7	5	2	0	.714	4th	Steve Englehart
2017	NCAA Division II	Gulf South	11	5	6	0	.455	8	3	5	0	.375	7th	Steve Englehart
2018	NCAA Division II	Gulf South	12	8	4	0	.667	8	5	3	0	.625	T-3rd	Steve Englehart
2019	NCAA Division II	Gulf South	11	5	6	0	.455	8	3	5	0	.375	T-6th	Steve Englehart
Totals			79	44	35	0	.557	51	25	26	0	.490		

== Playoffs ==
The Panthers appeared in the Division II playoffs twice. Their playoff record is 0–2.

FIT earned their first playoff berth in 2016, the fourth season in program history. Their 8–2 record earned them the #3 seed in Super Region Two and a first-round home game only to be upset by North Greenville, 27–13.

They returned to the playoffs two seasons later, earning the #6 seed in Super Region Two on the strength of an 8–3 record. They were again knocked out in the first round, this time at third-seeded Lenoir-Rhyne, 43–21.

Season	Coach	Playoff	Opponent	Result
2016	Steve Englehart	First Round	North Greenville	L 13–27
2018	Steve Englehart	First Round	at Lenoir-Rhyne	L 21–43

== Bowl games ==
The Panthers played in one bowl game, the 2013 ECAC Futures Bowl, which happened at the conclusion of their inaugural season against fellow first-year program Alderson-Broaddus in Philippi, West Virginia. The Panthers won that game, 32–20, on a snowy afternoon thanks to 295 passing yards and four touchdowns from Bobby Vega along with Xavier Milton's 14 receptions for 177 yards and two touchdowns.

Season	Coach	Bowl	Opponent	Result
2013	Steve Englehart	ECAC Futures Bowl	at Alderson Broaddus	W 32–20
