= Limestone Saints football =

Football program representing Limestone University

- First season: 2014; 12 years ago
- Last season: 2024; 2 years ago
- Athletic director: Hailey Martin
- Head coach: Jerricho Cotchery
- Stadium: Saints Field (capacity: 1,000)
- Location: Gaffney, South Carolina
- NCAA division: Division II
- Conference: South Atlantic Conference
- All-time record: 44–70 (.386)

Conference division championships
- 2 SAC Piedmont Division (2022–2023)
- Colors: Blue, white, and limestone gold
- Website: golimestonesaints.com

The Limestone Saints football program was the intercollegiate American football team for Limestone University located in the U.S. state of South Carolina. The team competeted at the NCAA Division II levels and were members of the South Atlantic Conference (SAC). Limestone's first football team was fielded in 2014. The team played its home games at the 1,000-seat Saints Field in Gaffney, South Carolina.

== Conference affiliations ==
Limestone played as both an independent and conference-affiliated team.

- NCAA Division II independent schools (2014–2016)
- South Atlantic Conference (2017–2024)

== Playoffs ==
The Saints made two appearances in the NCAA Division II playoffs. Their combined record was 0–2.

Year	Round	Opponent	Result
2022	First Round	West Florida	L 19–45
2023	First Round	Valdosta State	L 41–62

== Championships ==
=== Divisional championships ===
The Saints shared two division titles in 2022 and 2023 in the South Atlantic Conference Piedmont Division.

Year	Division championship	Opponent	Result
2022	South Atlantic Conference Piedmont Division	N/A	N/A
2023	South Atlantic Conference Piedmont Division	N/A	N/A
