= Florida Tech Panther Stadium =

Stadium in Florida, USA

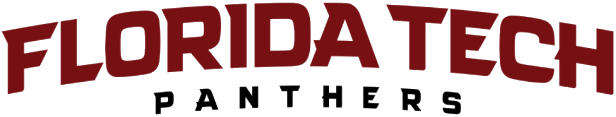
- Interactive map of Florida Tech Panther Stadium
- Address: 101 Pirate Lane; Melbourne, FL; United States
- Coordinates: 28.04869°N 80.62066°W
- Owner: Florida Institute of Technology
- Operator: Florida Tech Athletics
- Capacity: 4,980
- Type: Stadium
- Surface: Grass
- Current use: Lacrosse

Construction
- Opened: 1969; 57 years ago

Tenants
- Florida Tech (NCAA Division II) teams: women's lacrosse; football (2013–2019); Other teams: Palm Bay High School Pirates

Website
- floridatechsports.com/panther-stadium

Florida Tech Panther Stadium is an American football stadium located in Melbourne, Florida. The facility served as the home field for the NCAA Division II Florida Tech Panthers football team representing the Florida Institute of Technology, and is the home field for the Palm Bay Magnet High School Pirates football team.

The stadium, opened in 1969, also serves as home to the Florida Tech women's lacrosse team.

Prior to July 2015, the facility was known as Pirate Stadium before Florida Tech purchased naming rights for the stadium.
