= Valdosta State Blazers football =

College football team of Valdosta State University

2026 Valdosta State Blazers football team
- First season: 1982; 44 years ago
- Athletic director: Troy Katen
- Head coach: Graham Craig; 2nd season, 6–5 (.545)
- Location: Valdosta, Georgia
- Stadium: Bazemore–Hyder Stadium (capacity: 11,249)
- Conference: Gulf South Conference
- Colors: Red and black
- All-time record: 352–143–4 (.709)

NCAA Division II championships
- 2004, 2007, 2012, 2018

Conference championships
- 12
- Mascot: Blaze
- Marching band: Blazin' Brigade Marching Band
- Website: vstateblazers.com

The Valdosta State Blazers football program represents Valdosta State University in American football. The Blazers are a member of the Gulf South Conference (GSC) in NCAA Division II. Valdosta State University has had a football team since 1982. The Blazers play in Bazemore–Hyder Stadium in Valdosta, Georgia, which has a capacity of 11,249. The stadium is also the home of the historical Valdosta High School Wildcats. The Blazers have won a total of four Division II National Championship titles (2004, 2007, 2012 and 2018).

== History ==
Despite the demands for a team, Valdosta State University, then Valdosta State College, did not form a football team. Bama Adams announced the forming of a football team, VSU president Hugh C. Bailey called an early morning 1981 meeting which included VP for Business Sam Brooks, Athletic Director Billy Grant and coach Dave Waples. Bailey directed each to quickly move toward fielding a varsity team. The majority of VSU students voted for the team and an increase in student fees. In the Blazers first season, under the direction of Head Coach Jim Goodman, the team finished with a 5–5–1 record.

VSC had its first winning season in 1986 with a 9–2 record led by All-American Jessie Tuggle. In 1994 the Blazer won a school-record 11 victories, and with quarterback Chris Hatcher, played in the program's first national football tournament. Hatcher was the 1994 Harlon Hill Trophy winner. In 1996, with quarterback Lance Funderburk, the Blazers spent a week ranked No. 1 in the country in Division II and were the Gulf South Conference champions for the first time in school history.

In 2002, the Blazers went to their first national championship game against Grand Valley State, losing 31–24. In 2004, the Blazers returned to the National Championship, this time defeating Pittsburg State 36–31. For the 2006 season, the Blazers wore silver helmets to commemorate the 25th anniversary of the VSU football program. In 2007, the Blazers defeated Northwest Missouri State 25–20 for their second national championship title. The Blazers also have won 9 Gulf South Conference football championships (1996, 2000, 2001, 2002, 2004, 2010, 2018, 2019, 2021*). *Co-champions with the University of West Florida.

Two notable alumni are Jessie Tuggle, a linebacker who played his entire career in the National Football League with the Atlanta Falcons from 1987 to 2000, and Chris Hatcher was quarterback for the programs first national football tournament in 1994 and was that year's Harlon Hill Trophy winner. Hatcher was also Valdosta State's head football coach from 2000 to 2006 and amassed a 68–10 record with one national championship and four conference crowns during his six-year tenure at Valdosta State.

Kerwin Bell, former Florida Gator quarterback, led the Valdosta State team that won the 2018 Division II National Championship.

=== Hal Mumme era: 1992–1996 ===
Mumme took over as head coach at Valdosta State University in 1992. Mumme's record at Valdosta State was 40–17–1. In both 1994 and 1996 he led the team to the NCAA Division II playoff quarterfinals; Valdosta State had never made the playoffs previously.

In 1994 the Blazer won a school record 11 victories and Quarterback Chris Hatcher won the Harlon Hill Award as player of the year in NCAA Division II football.

The team was consistently ranked in the Division II top 20 and was ranked No. 1 in the nation in Division II for part of the 1996 season when they won their first Gulf South Conference championship.

=== Chris Hatcher era: 2000–2006 ===
Chris Hatcher was named the head coach of the Blazers in 2000. The "Hatch-Attack" completed its first season 10–2, and were Gulf South Conference Champions with an 8–1 conference record, a dramatic improvement from their previous 4–7 season.

In 2001 and 2002, the Blazers went undefeated during the regular season, and were GSC Champions for the third year in a row. The two seasons were a part of a GSC record 35 straight regular season victories. In 2002 VSU made its first national championship appearance with a 31–24 loss to Grand Valley State.

In 2003, the Blazers finished the season with a 10–2 record and an NCAA playoff berth.

In 2004, Hatcher led the Blazers to their second national championship appearance with and a 36–31 win over Pittsburg State for the national title. The Blazers were also GSC Champions in 2004 after an 11–1 regular season.

The 2005 season saw the first time the Blazers started the season ranked No. 1 in the polls. The Blazers started the season ranked No. 1 for four weeks but finished with a 9–3 record and their fifth straight playoff berth.

To recognize the 25th anniversary of the VSU football program, the Blazers wore silver helmets and pants in 2006. That year the Blazers missed the playoffs for the first time in the Chris Hatcher era, despite an 8–2 record and a top-ten ranking.

Hatcher left VSU after the 2006 season to be the head football coach at Georgia Southern, he left Valdosta State with a 76–12 overall record, a .864 winning percentage, and was the winningest coach in Blazer history.

=== David Dean era: 2007–2015 ===
David Dean was named head coach of the Blazers in 2007 after Chris Hatcher took the head coaching job at Georgia Southern. Dean was previously the offense coordinator for the Blazers.

In 2007, the "Dean Machine" started the season with five straight wins. Delta State defeated the Blazers 35–31, despite being down 28 points at the beginning of the second half. The Blazers then capped off the season with an eight-game winning streak and their second national championship title win against Northwest Missouri State, 25–20. This was the third straight championship appearance by the Bearcats, also the third straight time the Bearcats have lost the national championship game.

David Dean is only the second head coach to lead his team to a national championship in his first season. Earle Solomonson accomplished this at North Dakota State in 1985.

2008 and 2010 were the only years VSU has made it to the NCAA Division II playoffs since the 2007 national championship season. The 2008 season saw the Blazers make it to the second round of the playoffs and a 9–3 season. Valdosta posted an 8–3 record in 2010 and lost in the first round of the playoffs. After beginning the year unranked, the Blazers rose as high as No. 7 in the AFCA coaches poll, before finishing the regular season ranked No. 17. In 2010, the VSU team tied with Delta State and Henderson State for the Gulf South Conference championship, the only one in Dean's five years as head coach.

In 2009 and 2011 the Blazers had 6–4 seasons and missed the Division II playoffs. In 2009 VSU finished in third in the Gulf South Conference and fourth in 2011. VSU had been ranked as high as No. 4 in the AFCA poll in the first weeks of the 2011 season.

In 2012, the Blazers posted a 12–2 record for the year and beat Winston-Salem State 35–7 in the NCAA Division II National Football Championship in Florence, Alabama. The win gave VSU its third Division II National title in eight years. Dean left the Blazers to coach a single, unsuccessful year as co-offensive coordinator at FBS program Georgia Southern; both co-coordinators were fired after one year. David Dean is the only football coach in Valdosta State history to win two national championships.

=== Kerwin Bell era: 2016–2018 ===
Kerwin Bell was named head coach of the Blazers on January 22, 2016. Bell was formerly the head coach for the Jacksonville, prior to joining Valdosta State. Bell was also the starting quarterback for the Florida Gators from 1984 through 1987.

In Coach Bell's first season, 2016, the Blazers finished the season 8–3. They lost in the first round of the NCAA Division II playoffs to UNC Pembroke 24–21. VSU finished the season ranked No. 18.

During his second season in 2017 the Blazers finished 5–4 overall and 5–3 in conference. The record had them finishing 5th in conference, an unusually bad finish for them. The season saw them playing four televised games on ESPN going 1–3 in those matchups.

The 2018 season saw the Blazers go the campaign unbeaten at 14–0, earning the seventh GSC championship in program history and a fourth national championship by defeating Ferris State 49–47 in the national championship game in McKinney, Texas. The Blazers were the highest scoring team in Division II, totaling 728 points for an average of 52 points per game. Quarterback Rogan Wells was runner-up in the voting for the Harlon Hill Trophy.

On January 10, 2019, Bell left Valdosta State to accept the offensive coordinator position at South Florida.

=== Gary Goff era: 2019–2021 ===
On January 25, 2019, VSU announced former Tiffin head coach Gary Goff as the tenth head coach in program history. Goff, a former Blazer captain and 1996 graduate of VSU, had gone 23-10 the prior three seasons at Tiffin. During Goff's playing days he led the Blazers to their first ever championship in 1996. He is credited with being a part of the team that laid the foundation for the schools great history of winning.

Goff's first season saw the Blazers record an undefeated regular season, a second consecutive GSC championship and extend their winning streak to 25 consecutive games before being upset in the second round of the playoffs by West Florida, 38–35. His first season got his era off to a great start with them starting off ranked No. 1 even with the upsetting finish.

=== Independence: 2027–future ===
On October 2, 2026, Valdosta State announced the team will depart the Gulf South Conference following the 2026–27 season, after which the Blazers will become a Division II independent.

== Head coach records ==
Tenure	Coach	Years	Record	Pct.
1982–1984	Jim Goodman	3	15–17–1	.470
1985	Jim Berryman	1	5–6–0	.455
1986–1991	Mike Cavan	6	37–22–2	.623
1992–1996	Hal Mumme	5	40–17–1	.698
1997–1999	Mike Kelly	3	15–16–0	.484
1999	Mark Nelson	1	0–2–0	.000
2000–2006	Chris Hatcher	7	76–12–0	.864
2007–2015	David Dean	7	70–24–0	.745
2016–2018	Kerwin Bell	3	27–7–0	.794
2019–2021	Gary Goff	3	22–3–0	.880
2022–2024	Tremaine Jackson	3	30–9–0	.769
2025–present	Graham Craig	1	6–5–0	.545
Totals	12 coaches	44 seasons	352–143–4	.709

== Championships ==
=== National championships ===
Year	Association	Division	Head coach	Record	Opponent	Result
2004	NCAA (4)	Division II (4)	Chris Hatcher	13–1 (9–0 GSC)	Pittsburg State	W, 36–31
2007	NCAA (4)	Division II (4)	David Dean	13–1 (7–1 GSC)	Northwest Missouri State	W, 25–20
2012	NCAA (4)	Division II (4)	David Dean	12–2 (4–1 GSC)	Winston-Salem State	W, 35–7
2018	NCAA (4)	Division II (4)	Kerwin Bell	14–0 (8–0 GSC)	Ferris State	W, 49–47

=== Conference championships ===
- Gulf South Conference: 1996, 2000, 2001, 2002, 2004, 2010, 2018, 2019, 2021, 2023, 2024,2025

== Postseason appearances ==
=== NCAA Division II playoffs ===
The Blazers have made twenty-two appearances in the NCAA Division II playoffs, with a combined record of 34–17 and four national championships.

Year	Round	Opponent	Result
1994	First Round; Quarterfinals	Albany State; North Alabama	W, 14–7; L, 24–27 ^{2OT}
1996	First Round; Quarterfinals	Albany State; Carson–Newman	W, 38–28; L, 19–24
2000	First Round	Delta State	L, 12–49
2001	First Round; Quarterfinals	Fort Valley State; Catawba	W, 40–24; L, 34–37 ^{OT}
2002	First Round; Quarterfinals; Semifinals; National Championship	Catawba; Carson–Newman; Texas A&M–Commerce; Grand Valley State	W, 24–7; W, 31–28; W, 21–12; L, 24–31
2003	First Round	Carson–Newman	L, 29–35
2004	Second Round; Quarterfinals; Semifinals; National Championship	Carson–Newman; Albany State; West Chester; Pittsburg State	W, 38–12; W, 38–24; W, 45–21; W, 36–31
2005	First Round	North Alabama	L, 13–40
2007	Second Round; Quarterfinals; Semifinals; National Championship	Catawba; North Alabama; California (PA); Northwest Missouri State	W, 55–29; W, 37–27; W, 28–24; W, 25–21
2008	First Round; Second Round	Carson–Newman; North Alabama	W, 24–20; L, 10–37
2010	First Round	North Alabama	L, 20–43
2012	Second Round; Quarterfinals; Semifinals; National Championship	West Alabama; Carson–Newman; Minnesota State; Winston-Salem State	W, 49–21; W, 48–26; W, 35–19; W, 35–7
2014	First Round; Second Round; Quarterfinals	North Alabama; Lenoir–Rhyne; West Georgia	W, 33–31; W, 23–31; L, 17–31
2015	First Round; Second Round	Carson–Newman; West Georgia	W, 61–59; L, 20–27
2016	First Round	UNC Pembroke	L, 21–24
2018	Second Round; Quarterfinals; Semifinals; National Championship	Bowie State; Lenoir–Rhyne; Notre Dame (OH); Ferris State	W, 66–16; W, 61–21; W, 30–24; W, 49–47
2019	Second Round	West Florida	L, 35–38
2021	Second Round; Quarterfinals; Semifinals; National Championship	West Georgia; Bowie State; Colorado Mesa; Ferris State	W, 66–35; W, 41–17; W, 34–31; L, 17–58
2023	First Round; Second Round; Quarterfinals	Limestone; Delta State; Lenoir–Rhyne	W, 62–41; W, 38–31; L, 7–35
2024	Second Round; Quarterfinals; Semifinals; National Championship	Miles; Virginia Union; Minnesota State; Ferris State	W, 33–17; W, 49–14; W, 35–21; L, 14–49
2025	First Round	Albany State	L, 30–35
2026	First Round	Edward Waters	TBP
