= North Greenville Trailblazers football =

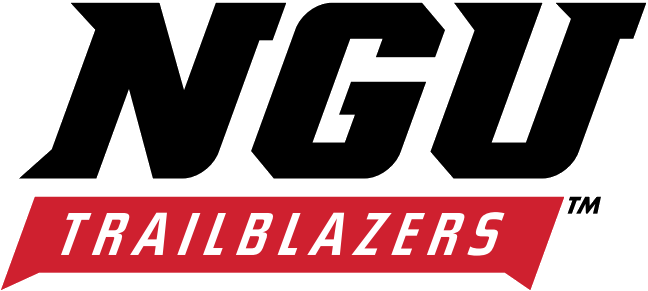
- First season: 1994; 32 years ago
- Athletic director: Jan McDonald
- Head coach: Nate Garner; 1st season, 6–5 (.545)
- Location: Tigerville, South Carolina
- Stadium: Younts Stadium (capacity: 4,500)
- NCAA division: Division II
- Conference: Gulf South Conference
- Colors: Black and red
- All-time record: 143–181 (.441)
- Website: nguathletics.com/football

The North Greenville Trailblazers football program is the intercollegiate American football team for North Greenville University located in the U.S. state of South Carolina. The team competes at the NCAA Division II level as a member of Conference Carolinas. North Greenville's first football team was fielded in 1994. The team plays its home games at the 5,000-seat Younts Stadium in Tigerville, South Carolina. Former NFL Offensive Lineman Nate Garner is the head coach for the Trailblazers.

== History ==
The Trailblazers started off as an National Association of Intercollegiate Athletics (NAIA) team in 1994. They finished their first season 1–8.

In 2003 North Greenville joined the NCAA as a Division II member. Four seasons after joining the NCAA they went 10–2 in 2006 and won the Victory Bowl. They made their first NCAA playoff appearance in 2011 and went on to make the quarterfinals before losing to Delta State.

As of 2023, they have made 2 Division II playoffs (2011 and 2016) and won 3 Victory Bowls (2006, 2010, and 2014).

== Notable former players ==
Notable alumni include:

- Andrew Jordan (American football)
- Clayton Holmes
- Jonathon Sharpe
- Nick Rosamonda
- Freddie Martino
- Willy Korn
- Chauncy Haney

== Year-by-year results ==
Statistics correct as of the end of the 2018-19 college football season

=== Junior college ===
1988 North Greenville Mounties Football team Junior College 9–1

1989 North Greenville Mounties Football team Junior College 9–0

1990 North Greenville Mounties Football team Junior College 7–2

1991 North Greenville Mounties Football team Junior College 8–0

1992 North Greenville Mounties Football team Junior College 7–3

1993 North Greenville Mounties Football team Transition to 4 year 5–5

=== College ===
| NCAA Division I champions | NCAA Division I FCS champions | NCAA Division II champions | Conference champions | Division champions | Bowl eligible | Undefeated season |

| Year | Association | Conference | Overall | | | | | Conference | | | | | | Coach | Final ranking |
| Year | Association | Conference | Games | Win | Loss | Tie | Pct. | Games | Win | Loss | Tie | Pct. | Standing | Coach | Final ranking |
|---|---|---|---|---|---|---|---|---|---|---|---|---|---|---|---|
| 1994 | NAIA | Independent | 9 | 1 | 8 | 0 | .111 | N/A | | | | | | Rich Beard | - |
| 1995 | NAIA | Mid-South | 11 | 5 | 6 | 0 | .455 | 0 | 0 | 0 | 0 | .000 | N/A | Steve Patton | - |
| 1996 | NAIA | Mid-South | 10 | 7 | 3 | 0 | .700 | 7 | 4 | 3 | 0 | .571 | T–3rd | Steve Patton | - |
| 1997 | NAIA | Mid-South | 10 | 2 | 8 | 0 | .111 | 6 | 0 | 6 | 0 | .000 | 7th | Scott Parker | - |
| 1998 | NAIA | Mid-South | 12 | 8 | 4 | 0 | .700 | 7 | 6 | 1 | 0 | .857 | T–1st | Scott Parker | - |
| 1999 | NAIA | Mid-South | 11 | 5 | 6 | 0 | .455 | 7 | 5 | 2 | 0 | .714 | 3rd | Joe Johnson | - |
| 2000 | NAIA | Mid-South | 10 | 0 | 10 | 0 | .000 | 8 | 0 | 8 | 0 | .000 | 8th | Joe Johnson | - |
| 2001 | NCAA Division II | Independent | 10 | 0 | 10 | 0 | .000 | N/A | | | | | | Joe Johnson | - |
| 2002 | NCAA Division II | Independent | 10 | 4 | 6 | 0 | .400 | N/A | | | | | | Brian Smith | - |
| 2003 | NCAA Division II | Independent | 11 | 6 | 5 | 0 | .545 | N/A | | | | | | Brian Smith | - |
| 2004 | NCAA Division II | Independent | 10 | 3 | 7 | 0 | .300 | N/A | | | | | | Mike Taylor | - |
| 2005 | NCAA Division II | Independent | 10 | 2 | 8 | 0 | .200 | N/A | | | | | | Mike Taylor | - |
| 2006 | NCAA Division II | Independent | 12 | 10 | 2 | 0 | .833 | N/A | | | | | | Mike Taylor | - |
| 2007 | NCAA Division II | Independent | 11 | 5 | 6 | 0 | .455 | N/A | | | | | | Mike Taylor | - |
| 2008 | NCAA Division II | Independent | 11 | 2 | 9 | 0 | .182 | N/A | | | | | | Mike Taylor | - |
| 2009 | NCAA Division II | Independent | 10 | 2 | 8 | 0 | .200 | N/A | | | | | | Jamey Chadwell | - |
| 2010 | NCAA Division II | Independent | 10 | 7 | 3 | 0 | .700 | N/A | | | | | | Jamey Chadwell | - |
| 2011 | NCAA Division II | Independent | 14 | 11 | 3 | 0 | .786 | N/A | | | | | | Jamey Chadwell | 12 |
| 2012 | NCAA Division II | Independent | 11 | 5 | 6 | 0 | .455 | N/A | | | | | | Carroll McCray | - |
| 2013 | NCAA Division II | Independent | 11 | 5 | 6 | 0 | .455 | N/A | | | | | | Jeff Farrington | - |
| 2014 | NCAA Division II | Independent | 12 | 7 | 5 | 0 | .583 | N/A | | | | | | Jeff Farrington | - |
| 2015 | NCAA Division II | Independent | 10 | 7 | 3 | 0 | .700 | N/A | | | | | | Jeff Farrington | - |
| 2016 | NCAA Division II | Independent | 14 | 9 | 5 | 0 | .643 | N/A | | | | | | Jeff Farrington | 17 |
| 2017 | NCAA Division II | Independent | 10 | 4 | 6 | 0 | .400 | N/A | | | | | | Jeff Farrington | - |
| 2018 | NCAA Division II | Gulf South | 10 | 4 | 6 | 0 | .400 | 7 | 3 | 4 | 0 | .429 | 6th | Jeff Farrington | - |
| 2019 | NCAA Division II | Gulf South | 10 | 3 | 7 | 0 | .300 | 8 | 2 | 6 | 0 | .250 | 8th | Jeff Farrington | - |
| 2021 | NCAA Division II | Gulf South | 11 | 5 | 6 | 0 | .454 | 7 | 2 | 5 | 0 | .400 | 6th | Jeff Farrington | - |
| 2022 | NCAA Division II | Gulf South | 11 | 3 | 8 | 0 | .273 | 7 | 2 | 5 | 0 | .400 | T-6th | Jeff Farrington | - |
| 2023 | NCAA Division II | Gulf South | 10 | 5 | 5 | 0 | .500 | 8 | 4 | 4 | 0 | .500 | T-5th | Jeff Farrington | - |
| 2024 | NCAA Division II | Gulf South | 11 | 6 | 5 | 0 | .545 | 7 | 4 | 3 | 0 | .571 | 4th | Jeff Farrington | - |
| Totals | | | 324 | 143 | 181 | 0 | .441 | 79 | 31 | 48 | 0 | .392 | | | |

== Championships ==
=== Conference championships ===
- Mid-South Conference (1998)

== Postseason ==
=== NCAA Division II playoffs ===
The Trailblazers have made three appearances in the NCAA Division II playoffs, with a combined record of 4–3.

| Year | Round | Opponent | Result |
|---|---|---|---|
| 2011 | First Round; Second Round; Quarterfinals | Albany State; Mars Hill; Delta State | W, 63–14; W, 52–38; L, 23–28 |
| 2016 | First Round; Second Round; Quarterfinals | Florida Tech; Tuskegee; North Alabama | W, 27–13; W, 45–26; L, 0–38 |
| 2025 | First Round | West Florida | L, 19–43 |

== Individual conference honors ==
=== Mid-South Conference ===
- Player of the Year

1998: Derek Burnette (QB)

- Coach of the Year

1998: Scott Parker

- ALL Mid-South 1st Team

1996: Anthony Johnson (DB)
1996: CoCo Henderson (RB)
1996: Patrick Banister (P)
1996: PJ Crosby (WR)
1996: Scott Buchanan (OL)
1996: Vernon Adams (DL)
1997: Patrick Banister (P)
1998: Derek Burnett (QB)
1998: Patrick Banister (K)
1998: Patrick Banister (P)
1998: Jerome Kennedy (SB)
1999: Trevor Cole (TE)
1999: Jamie Ballenter (P)
2000: Jamie Ballenter (P)

- ALL Mid-South 2nd Team

1996: Kamell Evans (DB)
1996: Michael Edmunds (DL)
1996: Stuart Fulcher (LB)
1997: Derek Burnette (QB)
1997: Clay Sims (OL)
1998: Aaron Moose (OL)
1998: Chris Davis (WR)
1998: Trevor Cole (TE)
1998: Scott Simpson (DL)
1999: Aaron Moose (OL)
1999: Chris Davis (WR)
1999: Corey Fountain (QB)
1999: James Rice (RB)
2000: Anton Gist (DB)

=== Gulf South Conference ===
- Defensive Player of the Year

2019: Chauncy Haney (DL)

- Defensive Freshman of the Year

2021: De'Iveon Donald
2022: Kendrick Clark Jr

- ALL-GSC 1st Team

2018: Seth Laughter (DL)
2019: Aaron Watson (DB)
2019 Chauncy Haney (DL)
2019: Johnny Worthy (BT)
2021: Myles Prosser (P)
2021: Nick Jones (STU)
2022: De'Iveon Donald (LB)
2022: Myles Prosser (P)

- ALL-GSC 2nd Team

2018: Demajiay Rooks (WR)
2019: Jordan Helms (TE)
2019: Dantevian Byrd (LB)
2019: Aaron Watson (DB)
2019: Chauncy Haney (BT)
2021: Dre' Williams (AP)
2021: De'Iveon Donald (LB)
2021: Aaron Watson (DB)
2022: Corey Watkins (RB)
2022: Lewis McBeth (OL)
2022: Kwame Livingston (DL)
2022: Kendrick Clark Jr (DB)
