= List of Gulf South Conference football standings =

This is a list of yearly Gulf South Conference football standings.

== Gulf South Conference standings ==
1984 Gulf South Conference football standings
	Conf.					Overall
Team	W		L		T	W		L		T
No. T–3 Troy State $^	7	–	1	–	0	12	–	1	–	0
No. 10 Mississippi College	5	–	2	–	1	6	–	2	–	1
North Alabama	4	–	1	–	3	7	–	1	–	3
Delta State	5	–	2	–	1	7	–	3	–	1
Jacksonville State	4	–	4	–	0	4	–	5	–	1
Livingston	3	–	5	–	0	5	–	5	–	0
Valdosta State	3	–	5	–	0	5	–	6	–	0
Tennessee–Martin	1	–	6	–	1	2	–	8	–	1
West Georgia	1	–	7	–	0	3	–	8	–	0
$ – Conference champion; ^ – NCAA Division II playoff participant; Rankings from NCAA Division II Football Committee poll

1987 Gulf South Conference football standings
	Conf.					Overall
Team	W		L		T	W		L		T
No. 4 Troy State $^	8	–	0	–	0	12	–	1	–	1
Mississippi College	5	–	3	–	0	6	–	5	–	0
North Alabama	4	–	3	–	1	7	–	3	–	1
Valdosta State	4	–	4	–	0	6	–	4	–	0
Delta State	3	–	4	–	1	6	–	4	–	1
Jacksonville State	3	–	4	–	1	5	–	4	–	1
Livingston	3	–	4	–	1	5	–	5	–	1
Tennessee–Martin	3	–	5	–	0	5	–	6	–	0
West Georgia	1	–	7	–	0	2	–	9	–	0
$ – Conference champion; ^ – NCAA Division II playoff participant; Rankings from NCAA Division II Football Committee poll

1993 Gulf South Conference football standings
	Conf.					Overall
Team	W		L		T	W		L		T
No. 1 North Alabama $^	7	–	0	–	0	14	–	0	–	0
Valdosta State	5	–	2	–	0	8	–	3	–	0
Central Arkansas	4	–	3	–	0	6	–	4	–	1
West Georgia	4	–	3	–	0	4	–	6	–	0
Henderson State	2	–	5	–	0	4	–	6	–	0
Livingston	1	–	5	–	1	2	–	7	–	1
Delta State	1	–	6	–	0	3	–	7	–	0
Mississippi College *	3	–	3	–	1	6	–	4	–	1
$ – Conference champion; ^ – NCAA Division II playoff participant; * – ineligible for conference championship; Rankings from NCAA Division II Football Committee poll

1994 Gulf South Conference football standings
	Conf.					Overall
Team	W		L		T	W		L		T
No. 1 North Alabama $^	7	–	0	–	0	13	–	1	–	0
No. 6 Valdosta State ^	6	–	1	–	0	11	–	2	–	0
Central Arkansas	6	–	1	–	0	8	–	2	–	0
No. 10 West Georgia	4	–	3	–	0	7	–	3	–	0
Delta State	2	–	4	–	1	3	–	5	–	2
Henderson State	1	–	5	–	1	2	–	8	–	1
Livingston	0	–	7	–	0	1	–	9	–	0
Mississippi College *	2	–	5	–	0	4	–	5	–	1
$ – Conference champion; ^ – NCAA Division II playoff participant; * – ineligible for conference championship; Rankings from NCAA Division II Football Committee poll

1995 Gulf South Conference football standings
	Conf.					Overall
Team	W		L		T	W		L		T
No. 1 North Alabama $^	8	–	0	–	0	14	–	0	–	0
No. 17 West Georgia ^	7	–	1	–	0	8	–	3	–	0
Central Arkansas	6	–	3	–	0	7	–	4	–	0
Henderson State	6	–	3	–	0	6	–	5	–	0
Valdosta State	4	–	3	–	0	6	–	5	–	0
Delta State	5	–	4	–	0	5	–	6	–	0
Arkansas–Monticello	3	–	3	–	0	6	–	5	–	0
Arkansas Tech	2	–	6	–	1	3	–	6	–	1
Mississippi College	2	–	7	–	1	2	–	7	–	1
Southern Arkansas	1	–	6	–	0	4	–	6	–	0
West Alabama	0	–	8	–	0	2	–	9	–	0
$ – Conference champion; ^ – NCAA Division II playoff participant; Rankings from NCAA Division II Football Committee poll

2007 Gulf South Conference football standings
	Conf.			Overall
Team	W		L	W		L
No. 10 Delta State $^	8	–	0	10	–	2
No. 1 Valdosta State ^	7	–	1	13	–	1
No. 6 North Alabama ^	7	–	1	10	–	2
Henderson State	6	–	2	7	–	3
Harding	5	–	3	6	–	4
Arkansas Tech	3	–	5	5	–	5
Arkansas–Monticello	3	–	5	4	–	7
Ouachita Baptist	2	–	6	4	–	6
Southern Arkansas	2	–	6	3	–	7
West Georgia	1	–	7	2	–	9
West Alabama	0	–	8	1	–	9
$ – Conference champion; ^ – NCAA Division II playoff participant; Rankings from AFCA poll

2011 Gulf South Conference football standings
	Conf.			Overall
Team	W		L	W		L
No. 4 Delta State $^	3	–	1	11	–	3
No. 14 North Alabama ^	2	–	2	9	–	4
No. 23 West Alabama ^	2	–	2	8	–	4
West Georgia	2	–	2	6	–	4
Valdosta State	1	–	3	6	–	4
$ – Conference champion; ^ – NCAA Division II playoff participant; Rankings from AFCA Poll

2012 Gulf South Conference football standings
	Conf.			Overall
Team	W		L	W		L
No. 21 West Alabama $^	5	–	0	9	–	4
No. 1 Valdosta State ^	4	–	1	12	–	2
Shorter #	2	–	3	6	–	5
North Alabama	2	–	3	5	–	5
Delta State	1	–	4	3	–	7
West Georgia	1	–	4	3	–	7
$ – Conference champion; ^ – NCAA Division II playoff participant; # – Provisional NCAA Division II member; Rankings from AFCA Poll

2013 Gulf South Conference football standings
	Conf.			Overall
Team	W		L	W		L
No. 10 North Alabama +^	5	–	1	10	–	3
West Alabama +	5	–	1	8	–	3
Delta State	4	–	2	7	–	3
Valdosta State	3	–	3	6	–	4
West Georgia	3	–	3	6	–	5
Florida Tech	1	–	5	5	–	7
Shorter #	0	–	6	2	–	9
+ – Conference co-champions; ^ – NCAA Division II playoff participant; # – Provisional Division II member; Rankings from AFCA Poll

2014 Gulf South Conference football standings
	Conf.			Overall
Team	W		L	W		L
No. 13 Delta State +^	6	–	1	9	–	2
No. 16 North Alabama +^	6	–	1	9	–	2
No. 6 West Georgia ^	5	–	2	12	–	3
No. 10 Valdosta State ^	5	–	2	10	–	3
Florida Tech	3	–	4	6	–	5
West Alabama	2	–	5	5	–	6
Shorter	1	–	6	3	–	8
Mississippi College #	0	–	7	1	–	9
+ – Conference co-champions; ^ – NCAA Division II playoff participant; # – Provisional Division II member; Rankings from AFCA Poll

2015 Gulf South Conference football standings
	Conf.			Overall
Team	W		L	W		L
No. 3 West Georgia +^	6	–	1	12	–	2
No. 15 North Alabama +^	6	–	1	9	–	3
No. 14 Valdosta State ^	5	–	2	9	–	3
Florida Tech	5	–	2	7	–	4
West Alabama	3	–	4	7	–	4
Delta State	2	–	5	6	–	5
Shorter	1	–	6	2	–	8
Mississippi College #	0	–	7	2	–	8
+ – Conference co-champions; ^ – NCAA Division II playoff participant; # – Provisional Division II member; Rankings from AFCA Poll

2016 Gulf South Conference football standings
	Conf.			Overall
Team	W		L	W		L
No. 2 North Alabama $^	7	–	0	11	–	2
No. 18 Valdosta State ^	6	–	2	8	–	3
West Alabama	6	–	2	7	–	4
Florida Tech ^	5	–	2	8	–	3
West Georgia	4	–	4	7	–	4
West Florida	3	–	5	5	–	6
Delta State †	3	–	5	4	–	6
Mississippi College	1	–	7	3	–	7
Shorter	0	–	8	0	–	11
$ – Conference champion; ^ – NCAA Division II playoff participant; † – Delta State's record is officially listed as 2–8 (1–7) due to the use of ineligible players in two wins, but the opponents are not credited with wins.; Rankings from AFCA Poll

2017 Gulf South Conference football standings
	Conf.			Overall
Team	W		L	W		L
No. 12 West Alabama $^	7	–	1	10	–	3
No. 2 West Florida ^	5	–	3	11	–	4
No. 21 Delta State ^	5	–	3	9	–	4
No. 19 West Georgia ^	5	–	3	9	–	4
Valdosta State	5	–	3	5	–	4
North Alabama	5	–	3	5	–	5
Florida Tech	3	–	5	5	–	6
Mississippi College	1	–	7	1	–	9
Shorter	0	–	8	0	–	11
$ – Conference champion; ^ – NCAA Division II playoff participant; Rankings from AFCA Poll

2018 Gulf South Conference football standings
	Conf.			Overall
Team	W		L	W		L
No. 1 Valdosta State $^	8	–	0	14	–	0
No. 16 West Georgia ^	7	–	1	10	–	2
Florida Tech ^	5	–	3	8	–	4
West Alabama ^	5	–	3	8	–	4
West Florida	4	–	4	6	–	5
North Greenville	3	–	4	4	–	6
Delta State	2	–	6	2	–	8
Mississippi College	1	–	6	3	–	7
Shorter	0	–	8	0	–	11
$ – Conference champion; ^ – NCAA Division II playoff participant; Rankings from AFCA Poll

2019 Gulf South Conference football standings
	Conf.			Overall
Team	W		L	W		L
No. 5 Valdosta State $^	8	–	0	10	–	1
No. 1 West Florida ^	7	–	1	13	–	2
Delta State	5	–	3	6	–	4
West Georgia	4	–	4	6	–	5
Mississippi College	4	–	4	5	–	5
West Alabama	3	–	5	6	–	5
Florida Tech	3	–	5	5	–	6
North Greenville	2	–	6	3	–	7
Shorter	0	–	8	1	–	10
$ – Conference champion; ^ – NCAA Division II playoff participant; Rankings from AFCA Poll

2020 Gulf South Conference football standings
	Conf.			Overall
Team	W		L	W		L
West Alabama		–		2	–	0
Shorter		–		2	–	2
Mississippi College		–		0	–	1
Notes: Due to COVID-19, the Gulf South Conference suspended the fall 2020 football season. The conference also announced no in-conference competition for spring 2021 play. Schools scheduled own games if desired to play. Delta State, North Greenville, Valdosta State, West Florida, and West Georgia opted out of the spring season.

2021 Gulf South Conference football standings
	Conf.			Overall
Team	W		L	W		L
No. 2 Valdosta State +^	6	–	1	12	–	2
No. 12 West Florida +^	6	–	1	9	–	2
No. 13 West Georgia ^	5	–	2	9	–	3
West Alabama	4	–	3	6	–	4
Delta State	3	–	4	5	–	6
Mississippi College	2	–	5	4	–	6
North Greenville	2	–	5	5	–	6
Shorter	0	–	7	3	–	8
+ – Conference co-champions; ^ – NCAA Division II playoff participant; Rankings from AFCA Poll
