= 2022 Gulf South Conference football season =

- Sport: Football
- Teams: 8
- Co-champions: West Florida, Delta State

Football seasons
- 2021 2023

2022 Gulf South Conference football standings
	Conf.			Overall
Team	W		L	W		L
No. 4 West Florida +^	6	–	1	12	–	2
No. 9 Delta State +^	6	–	1	11	–	2
No. 19 West Georgia	5	–	2	8	–	2
West Alabama	3	–	4	5	–	6
Mississippi College	3	–	4	4	–	7
Valdosta State	2	–	5	5	–	6
North Greenville	2	–	5	3	–	8
Shorter	1	–	6	3	–	8
+ – Conference co-champions; ^ – NCAA Division II playoff participant; Rankings from AFCA poll

The 2022 Gulf South Conference football season was the season of college football played by the eight member schools of the Gulf South Conference (GSC) as part of the 2022 NCAA Division II football season.

West Florida and Delta State were GSC co-champions for the 2022 season. They were ranked No. 4 and No. 9, respectively, in the final 2022 NCAA Division II football rankings issued by the American Football Coaches Association (AFCA). A third conference member, West Georgia, placed at No. 19 in the final AFCA rankings.

Quarterback Patrick Shegog of Delta State was selected as the GSC Offensive Player of the Year. Linebacker Michael Anderson of West Alabama was named Defensive Player of the Year. Todd Cooley of Delta State won the GSC Coach of the Year award.

== Conference overview ==
Conf. rank	Team	Head coach	Overall record	Conf. record	Points scored/game	Points against/game
1	West Florida	Pete Shinnick	12–2	6–1	40.1	28.9
1	Delta State	Todd Cooley	11–2	6–1	45.9	27.7
3	West Georgia	David Dean	8–2	5–2	39.8	29.0
4	West Alabama	Brett Gilliland	5–6	3–4	25.7	24.7
4	Mississippi College	John Bland	4–7	3–4	30.4	39.3
6	Valdosta State	Tremaine Jackson	5–6	2–5	34.6	43.7
6	North Greenville	Jeff Farrington	3–8	2–5	30.3	37.1
8	Shorter	Zach Morrison	3–8	1–6	20.9	37.7

== Conference awards ==
=== Individual awards ===
- Offensive Player of the Year - Patrick Shegog, Delta State
- Defensive Player of the Year - Michael Anderson, West Alabama
- Offensive Freshman of the Year - John Henry White, Mississippi College
- Defensive Freshman of the Year - Kendrick Clark, North Greenville
- Coach of the Year - Todd Cooley, Delta State

=== All-conference team ===
First-team offense

- Quarterback - Patrick Shegog, Delta State
- Running backs - Shomari Mason, West Florida; Jaxton Carson, West Georgia
- AP - Seth McGill, Valdosta State; Bry Webb, West Alabama
- Tight end - Kyle Morlock, Shorter
- Wide receivers - David Durden, West Florida; Dohnte Meyers, Delta State; Caden Leggett, West Florida; Victor Talley, Valdosta State
- Center - Zac Elam, West Florida
- Offensive guards - Dalton Simpler, West Florida; Keshawn Jennings, Delta State
- Offensive tackles - Jacob Bruce, West Florida; Nicolas Melsop, Delta State

First-team defense

- Defensive line - Davonch Bryant, West Alabama; Pooda Walker, West Florida Timaje Porter, Delta State; Marzavion Dix, West Georgia
- Linebackers - Michael Anderson, West Alabama; Donald De’Iveon, North Greenville;; Willie Jordan, West Florida; Tamos Stevenson, Delta State
- Defensive backs - Shamar Lewis, West Alabama; Robert Carter, West Georgia; Deontae Overstreet, West Georgia#; Malik Jones, Delta State

First-team special teams

- Kicker - Nick Herber, Delta State
- Punter - Myles Prosser, North Greenville
- Return specialist - David Durden, West Florida
- UT - Da’Quan Bailey-Brown, West Florida; Cody Myers, Mississippi College

== Teams ==
=== West Florida ===
2022 West Florida Argonauts football

GSC co-champion

NCAA Division II Semifinal, L 17–38 vs. Ferris State
- Conference: Gulf South Conference

Ranking
- AFCA: No. 4
- Record: 12–2 (6–1 GSC)
- Head coach: Pete Shinnick (7th season)
- Offensive coordinator: Rudy Carlton (2nd season)
- Defensive coordinator: Darian Dulin (6th season)
- Home stadium: Pen Air Field

The 2022 West Florida Argonauts football team represented the University of West Florida of Pensacola, Florida. In their seventh year under head coach Pete Shinnick, the Argonauts compiled a 12–2 record (6–1 against conference opponents), tied for the GSC championship, and were ranked No. 4 in the final of the AFCA poll. They advanced to the NCAA Division II playoffs, losing to Ferris State in a semifinal game.

West Florida played its home games at Pen Air Field in Pensacola. Before the 2022 season, the Argonauts played their home games at Admiral Fetterman Field.

==== Schedule ====
Date	Time	Opponent	Rank	Site	TV	Result	Attendance
September 3	6:00 p.m.	Warner*	No. 11	Pen Air Field; Pensacola, FL	FloSports	W 52–3	4,451
September 10	6:00 p.m.	at Southwest Baptist*	No. 7	Plaster Stadium; Bolivar, MO	GLVC Sports Network	W 49–10	2,040
September 24	6:00 p.m.	Delta State	No. 6	Pen Air Field; Pensacola, FL	FloSports	L 42–45 ^{2OT}	5,238
October 1	4:00 p.m.	North Greenville	No. 14	Pen Air Field; Pensacola, FL	FloSports	W 34–31	4,219
October 8	5:00 p.m.	at No. 15 West Georgia	No. 10	University Stadium; Carrollton, GA	FloSports	W 42–28	1,644
October 15	11:00 a.m.	Shorter	No. 9	Barron Stadium; Rome, GA	FloSports	W 50–26	1,426
October 22	4:00 p.m.	Mississippi College^{†}	No. 9	Pen Air Field; Pensacola, FL	FloSports	W 45–17	5,503
October 29	2:00 p.m.	West Alabama	No. 9	Pen Air Field; Pensacola, FL	FloSports	W 36–24	5,018
November 5	6:00 p.m.	at Valdosta State	No. 8	Bazemore–Hyder Stadium; Valdosta, GA	FloSports	W 32–31	3,003
November 12	2:00 p.m.	at Mississippi College*	No. 7	Robinson-Hale Stadium; Clinton, MS	FloSports	W 56–21	2,879
November 19	1:00 p.m.	Limestone*	No. 6	Pen Air Field; Pensacola, FL (NCAA Division II First Round)	UWF Sports Network	W 45–19	2,147
November 26	1:30 p.m.	at No. 9 Delta State*	No. 6	McCool Stadium; Cleveland, MS (NCAA Division II Second Round)	Statesmen Sports Network	W 38–27	1,059
December 3	1:00 p.m.	No. 22 Wingate*	No. 6	Pen Air Field; Pensacola, FL (NCAA Division II Quarterfinal)	UWF Sports Network	W 45–14	4,247
December 10	11:00 a.m.	at No. 5 Ferris State*	No. 6	Top Taggart Field; Big Rapids, MI (NCAA Division II Semifinal)	ESPN+	L 17–38	5,105
*Non-conference game; ^{†}Homecoming; Rankings from AFCA Poll released prior to the game; All times are in Central time

==== Rankings ====
Ranking movements Legend: ██ Increase in ranking ██ Decrease in ranking ( ) = First-place votes
	Week												
Poll	Pre	1	2	3	4	5	6	7	8	9	10	11	Final
AFCA	11	7 (1)	6	6	14	10	9	9	9	8	7	6	4

=== Delta State ===
2022 Delta State Statesmen football
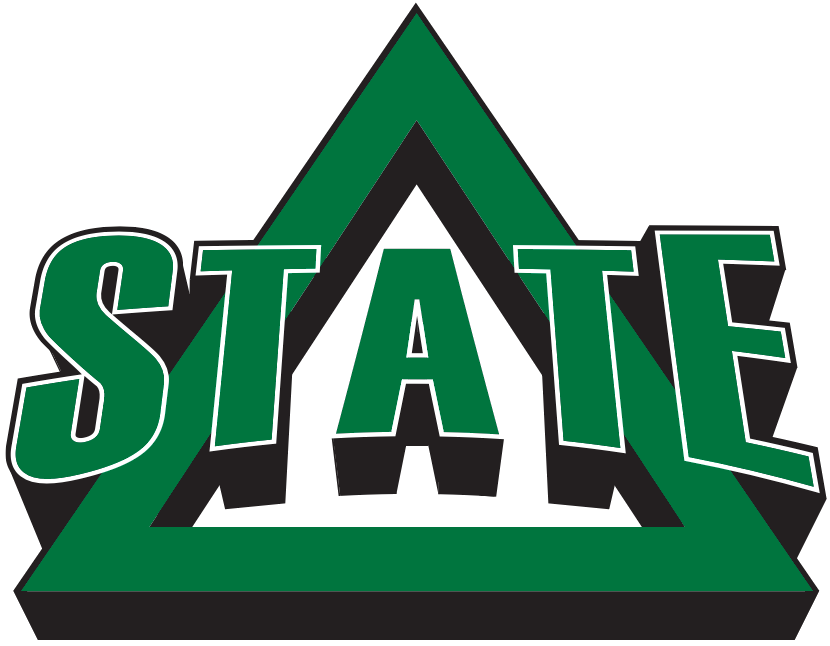

GSC co-champion

NCAA Division II Second Round, L 27–38 vs. West Florida
- Conference: Gulf South Conference

Ranking
- AFCA: No. 9
- Record: 11–2 (6–1 GSC)
- Head coach: Todd Cooley (10th season)
- Offensive coordinator: Jonathan Fletcher (1st season)
- Defensive coordinator: Kelvin Green (4th season)
- Home stadium: Parker Field at Horace McCool Stadium

The 2022 Delta State Statesmen football team represented Delta State University of Cleveland, Mississippi. In their tenth year under head coach Todd Cooley, the Statesmen compiled an 11–2 record (6–1 against conference opponents), tied for the GSC championship, and were ranked No. 9 in the final AFCA poll. they advanced to the NCAA Division II playoffs, losing to West Florida in the second round. They played their home games at Parker Field at Horace McCool Stadium.

==== Schedule ====
Date	Time	Opponent	Rank	Site	TV	Result	Attendance
September 3	1:00 p.m.	at Kentucky State*		Alumni Field; Frankfort, KY		W 33–10	1,476
September 10	1:00 p.m.	at McKendree*		Leemon Field; Lebanon, IL		W 58–34	3,500
September 17	6:00 p.m.	at Mississippi Valley State*		Rice–Totten Stadium; Itta Bena, MS	YouTube	W 28–17	3,208
September 24	6:00 p.m.	at No. 6 West Florida		Pen Air Field; Pensacola, FL	FloSports	W 45–42 ^{2OT}	5,238
October 1	6:00 p.m.	No. 13 Valdosta State	No. 25	McCool Stadium; Cleveland, MS	FloSports	W 70–31	
October 8	12:00 p.m.	at North Greenville	No. 13	Younts Stadium; Tigerville, SC	FloSports	W 47–14	3,152
October 15	6:00 p.m.	West Alabama	No. 10	McCool Stadium; Cleveland, MS	FloSports	W 20–7	1,100
October 20	7:00 p.m.	at Shorter	No. 8	Barron Stadium; Rome, GA	FloSports	W 45–10	785
October 29	6:00 p.m.	at Mississippi College	No. 8	Robinson-Hale Stadium; Clinton, MS (rivalry)	FloSports	W 52–38	4,341
November 5	2:00 p.m.	No. 19 West Georgia^{†}	No. 6	McCool Stadium; Cleveland, MS	FloSports	L 42–52	3,000
November 12	2:00 p.m.	West Alabama*	No. 12	McCool Stadium; Cleveland, MS	FloSports	W 17–7	2,000
November 19	1:00 p.m.	Fayetteville State*	No. 9	McCool Stadium; Cleveland, MS (NCAA Division II First Round)	Statesmen Sports Network	W 51–0	509
November 26	1:30 p.m.	No. 6 West Florida*	No. 9	McCool Stadium; Cleveland, MS (NCAA Division II Second Round)	Statesmen Sports Network	L 27–38	1,059
*Non-conference game; ^{†}Homecoming; Rankings from AFCA Poll released prior to the game; All times are in Central time

==== Rankings ====
Ranking movements Legend: ██ Increase in ranking ██ Decrease in ranking — = Not ranked RV = Received votes
	Week												
Poll	Pre	1	2	3	4	5	6	7	8	9	10	11	Final
AFCA	RV	—	—	—	25	13	10	8	8	6	12	9	9

=== West Georgia ===
2022 West Georgia Wolves football
- Conference: Gulf South Conference

Ranking
- AFCA: No. 19
- Record: 8–2 (5–2 GSC)
- Head coach: David Dean (6th season)
- Offensive coordinator: Graham Craig (4th season)
- Defensive coordinator: Nate Masters (3rd season)
- Home stadium: University Stadium

The 2022 West Georgia Wolves football team represented the University of West Georgia of Carrollton, Georgia. In their sixth year under head coach David Dean, the Wolves compiled an 8–2 record (5–2 against conference opponents), finished third in the GSC, and were ranked No. 19 in the final AFCA poll. They played their home games at University Stadium.

==== Schedule ====
Date	Time	Opponent	Rank	Site	TV	Result	Attendance
September 1	7:00 p.m.	Carson–Newman*	No. 12	University Stadium; Carrollton, GA		W 38–7	2,684
September 10	6:00 p.m.	at Morehouse*	No. 10	B. T. Harvey Stadium; Atlanta, GA		W 42–0	2,227
September 24	3:00 p.m.	at West Alabama	No. 8	Tiger Stadium; Livingston, AL	FloSports	W 22–7	3,124
October 1	6:00 p.m.	Mississippi College^{†}	No. 5	University Stadium; Carrollton, GA	FloSports	L 38–39	3,044
October 8	6:00 p.m.	No. 10 West Florida	No. 15	University Stadium; Carrollton, GA	FloSports	L 28–42	1,644
October 15	1:00 p.m.	at North Greenville	No. 25	Younts Stadium; Tigerville, SC	FloSports	W 38–35	1,837
October 22	6:00 p.m.	Valdosta State	No. 25	University Stadium; Carrollton, GA (rivalry)	FloSports	W 54–17	2,583
October 29	6:00 p.m.	Shorter	No. 24	University Stadium; Carrollton, GA	FloSports	W 49–14	1,974
November 5	3:00 p.m.	at No. 6 Delta State	No. 19	McCool Stadium; Cleveland, MS	FloSports	W 52–42	3,000
November 12	12:30 p.m.	at North Greenville*	No. 16	Younts Stadium; Tigerville, SC	FloSports	W 43-36	2,843
*Non-conference game; ^{†}Homecoming; Rankings from AFCA Poll released prior to the game; All times are in Eastern time

==== Rankings ====
Ranking movements Legend: ██ Increase in ranking ██ Decrease in ranking
	Week												
Poll	Pre	1	2	3	4	5	6	7	8	9	10	11	Final
AFCA	12	10	8	8	5	15	25	25	24	19	16	16	19

=== West Alabama ===
2022 West Alabama Tigers football
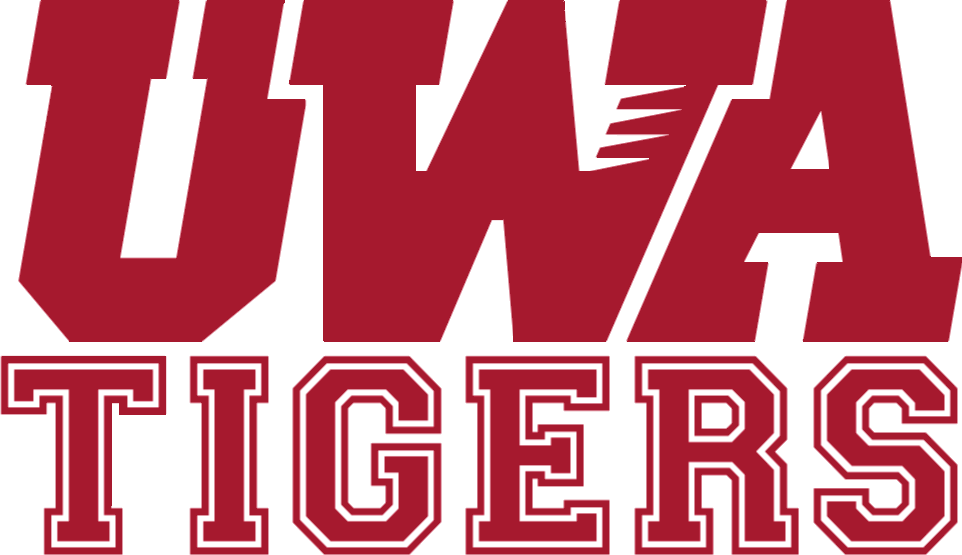
- Conference: Gulf South Conference
- Record: 5–6 (3–4 GSC)
- Head coach: Brett Gilliland (9th season)
- Offensive coordinator: Don Bailey (7th season)
- Defensive coordinator: Steve Sisa (6th season)
- Home stadium: Tiger Stadium

The 2022 West Alabama Tigers football team represented the University of West Alabama of Livingston, Alabama. In their ninth year under head coach Brett Gilliland, the Tigers compiled a 5–6 record (3–4 against conference opponents) and finished fourth in the conference. The Tigers played all their home games at Tiger Stadium.

==== Schedule ====
Date	Time	Opponent	Site	TV	Result	Attendance	Source
September 3	5:00 p.m.	at Morehouse*	B. T. Harvey Stadium; Atlanta, GA		W 24–16	5,168	
September 10	6:00 p.m.	at Miles*	Albert J. Sloan–Alumni Stadium; Fairfield, AL	boxcast.tv	W 31–0	4,411	
September 17	2:00 p.m.	Tuskegee*	Tiger Stadium; Livingston, AL	FloSports	L 10-13	4,414	
September 24	2:00 p.m.	No. 8 West Georgia	Tiger Stadium; Livingston, AL	FloSports	L 7–22	3,124	
October 1	2:00 p.m.	Shorter	Tiger Stadium; Livingston, AL	FloSports	W 37-14	3,727	
October 8	6:00 p.m.	at Valdosta State	Bazemore–Hyder Stadium; Valdosta, GA	FloSports	W 34–31	2,248	
October 15	6:00 p.m.	at No. 10 Delta State	McCool Stadium; Cleveland, MS	FloSports	L 7–20	1,100	
October 22	4:00 p.m.	North Greenville^{†}	Tiger Stadium; Livingston, AL	FloSports	L 33–34	5,141	
October 29	2:00 p.m.*1	at No. 9 West Florida	Pen Air Field; Pensacola, FL	FloSports	L 24–36	5,018	
November 5	2:00 p.m.	Mississippi College	Tiger Stadium; Livingston, AL	FloSports	W 38–16	2,117	
November 12	2:00 p.m.	at No. 12 Delta State*	McCool Stadium; Cleveland, MS	FloSports	L 7-17	2,000	
*Non-conference game; ^{†}Homecoming; Rankings from AFCA Poll released prior to the game; All times are in Central time

- 1 The October 29 game was originally scheduled for 4.00 p.m. but moved because of risk of inclement weather.

=== Mississippi College ===
2022 Mississippi College Choctaws football
- Conference: Gulf South Conference
- Record: 4–7 (3–4 GSC)
- Head coach: John Bland (9th season)
- Offensive coordinator: Tommy Laurendine (5th season)
- Defensive coordinator: Tony Gilbert (4th season)
- Home stadium: Robinson-Hale Stadium

The 2022 Mississippi College Choctaws football team represented Mississippi College of Clinton, Mississippi. In their ninth year under head coach John Bland, the Choctaws compiled a 4–7 record (3–4 against conference opponents) and finished fifth in the conference. They played their home games at Robinson-Hale Stadium.

==== Schedule ====
Date	Time	Opponent	Site	TV	Result	Attendance
September 3	6:00 p.m.	at No. 18 Albany State*	Albany State University Coliseum; Albany, GA		L 14–28	3,500
September 10	12:00 p.m.	Keiser*	Robinson-Hale Stadium; Clinton, MS	FloSports	W 26–8	4,347
September 17	2:00 p.m.	North Greenville	Robinson-Hale Stadium; Clinton, MS	FloSports	L 19–41	3,972
September 24	7:00 p.m.	at McNeese State*	Cowboy Stadium; Lake Charles, LA	ESPN+	L 17–32	10,105
October 1	5:00 p.m.	at No. 5 West Georgia	University Stadium; Carrollton, GA	FloSports	W 39–38	3,044
October 8	2:00 p.m.	Shorter	Robinson-Hale Stadium; Clinton, MS	FloSports	W 35–21	3,847
October 15	2:00 p.m.	at Valdosta State	Bazemore–Hyder Stadium; Valdosta, GA	FloSports	W 49–40	3,782
October 22	4:00 p.m.	at No. 9 West Florida	Pen Air Field; Pensacola, FL	FloSports	L 17-45	5,503
October 29	6:00 p.m.	No. 8 Delta State^{†}	Robinson-Hale Stadium; Clinton, MS (rivalry)	FloSports	L 38-52	4,341
November 5	2:00 p.m.	at West Alabama	Tiger Stadium; Livingston, AL	FloSports	L 16-38	2,117
November 12	2:00 p.m.	No. 7 West Florida*	Robinson–Hale Stadium; Clinton, MS	FloSports	L 21-56	2,879
*Non-conference game; ^{†}Homecoming; Rankings from AFCA Poll released prior to the game; All times are in Central time

=== Valdosta State ===
2022 Valdosta State Blazers football
- Conference: Gulf South Conference
- Record: 5–6 (2–5 GSC)
- Head coach: Tremaine Jackson (1st season)
- Offensive coordinator: Rick Bowie (1st season)
- Defensive coordinator: Brandon Andersen (1st season)
- Home stadium: Bazemore–Hyder Stadium

The 2022 Valdosta State Blazers football team represented Valdosta State University of Valdosta, Georgia. In their first year under head coach Tremaine Jackson, the Blazers compiled a 5–6 record (2–5 against conference opponents) and finished sixth in the GSC. They played their home games at Bazemore–Hyder Stadium.

==== Schedule ====
Date	Time	Opponent	Rank	Site	TV	Result	Attendance
September 1	7:00 p.m.	Keiser*	No. 3	Bazemore–Hyder Stadium; Valdosta, GA		W 36–21	5,381
September 10	5:00 p.m.	Virginia Union*	No. 3	Bazemore–Hyder Stadium; Valdosta, GA	FloSports	L 40–45	4,001
September 17	7:00 p.m.	at Miles*	No. 15	Albert J. Sloan–Alumni Stadium; Fairfield, AL		W 55–7	1,142
September 24	12:00 p.m.	at Shorter	No. 15	Barron Stadium; Rome, GA	FloSports	W 34–30	1,107
October 1	7:00 p.m.	at No. 25 Delta State	No. 13	McCool Stadium; Cleveland, MS	FloSports	L 31–70	
October 8	7:00 p.m.	West Alabama		Bazemore–Hyder Stadium; Valdosta, GA	FloSports	L 31–34	2,248
October 15	3:00 p.m.	Mississippi College^{†}		Bazemore–Hyder Stadium; Valdosta, GA	FloSports	L 40–49	3,728
October 22	6:00 p.m.	at No. 25 West Georgia		University Stadium; Carrollton, GA (rivalry)	FloSports	L 17–54	2,583
October 29	3:00 p.m.	at North Greenville		Younts Stadium; Tigerville, SC	FloSports	W 58–37	2,875
November 5	7:00 p.m.	No. 8 West Florida		Bazemore–Hyder Stadium; Valdosta, GA	FloSports	L 31–32	3,003
November 12	3:00 p.m.	Shorter*		Bazemore–Hyder Stadium; Valdosta, GA	FloSports	W 30-28	2,288
*Non-conference game; ^{†}Homecoming; Rankings from AFCA Poll released prior to the game; All times are in Eastern time

==== Rankings ====
Ranking movements Legend: ██ Increase in ranking ██ Decrease in ranking — = Not ranked RV = Received votes
	Week												
Poll	Pre	1	2	3	4	5	6	7	8	9	10	11	Final
AFCA	3	3	15	15	13	RV	—	—	—	—	—	—	—

=== North Greenville ===
2022 North Greenville Crusaders football
- Conference: Gulf South Conference
- Record: 3–8 (2–5 GSC)
- Head coach: Jeff Farrington (10th season)
- Offensive coordinator: Brad Robbins (4th season)
- Defensive coordinator: Maurice Duncan (2nd season)
- Home stadium: Younts Stadium

The 2022 North Greenville Crusaders football team represented North Greenville University of Tigerville, South Carolina. In their tenth year under head coach Jeff Farrington, the Crusaders compiled a 3–8 record (2–5 against conference opponents) and finished seventh in the conference. They played their home games at Younts Stadium.

==== Schedule ====
Date	Time	Opponent	Site	TV	Result	Attendance
September 1	7:00 p.m.	at Furman*	Paladin Stadium; Greenville, SC	ESPN3	L 0–52	9,264
September 10	7:00 p.m.	No. 13 Newberry*	Younts Stadium; Tigerville, SC	FloSports	L 22–29	3,117
September 17	3:00 p.m.	at Mississippi College	Robinson-Hale Stadium; Clinton, MS	FloSports	W 41–19	3,972
September 24	1:00 p.m.	Findlay*	Younts Stadium; Tigerville, SC	FloSports	W 34–27	2,374
October 1	5:00 p.m.	at No. 14 West Florida	Pen Air Field; Pensacola, FL	FloSports	L 31–34	4,219
October 8	1:00 p.m.	No. 13 Delta State	Younts Stadium; Tigerville, SC	FloSports	L 14–47	3,152
October 15	1:00 p.m.	No. 25 West Georgia	Younts Stadium; Tigerville, SC	FloSports	L 35–38	1,837
October 22	5:00 p.m.	at West Alabama	Tiger Stadium; Livingston, AL	FloSports	W 34–33	5,141
October 29	3:00 p.m.	Valdosta State^{†}	Younts Stadium; Tigerville, SC	FloSports	L 37–58	2,875
November 5	12:00 p.m.	at Shorter	Barron Stadium; Rome, GA	FloSports	L 14–31	1,187
November 12	12:30 p.m.	No. 16 West Georgia*	Younts Stadium; Tigerville, SC	FloSports	L 36–43	2,843
*Non-conference game; ^{†}Homecoming; Rankings from AFCA Poll released prior to the game; All times are in Eastern time

=== Shorter ===
2022 Shorter Hawks football
- Conference: Gulf South Conference
- Record: 3–8 (1–6 GSC)
- Head coach: Zach Morrison (5th season)
- Defensive coordinator: Harlen Jacobs (3rd season)
- Home stadium: Barron Stadium

The 2022 Shorter Hawks football team represented Shorter University of Rome, Georgia. In their fifth year head coach Zach Morrison, the Hawks compiled a 3–8 record (1–6 against conference opponents) and finished eighth in the conference. They played their home games at Barron Stadium.

==== Schedule ====
Date	Time	Opponent	Site	TV	Result	Attendance
September 3	1:00 p.m.	at Brevard*	Ives-Lemel Family Field; Brevard, NC		W 45–6	1,372
September 10	12:00 p.m.	Catawba*	Barron Stadium; Rome, GA	FloSports	W 34–21	1,750
September 17	12:00 p.m.	No. 21 Albany State*	Barron Stadium; Rome, GA	FloSports	L 20–42	1,325
September 24	12:00 p.m.	No. 15 Valdosta State	Barron Stadium; Rome, GA	FloSports	L 30–34	1,107
October 1	3:00 p.m.	at West Alabama	Tiger Stadium; Livingston, AL	FloSports	L 14–37	3,127
October 8	3:00 p.m.	at Mississippi College	Robinson-Hale Stadium; Clinton, MS	FloSports	L 21–35	3,847
October 15	12:00 p.m.	No. 9 West Florida	Barron Stadium; Rome, GA	FloSports	L 26–50	1,426
October 20	7:00 p.m.	No. 8 Delta State	Barron Stadium; Rome, GA	FloSports	L 10–45	785
October 29	6:00 p.m.	at No. 24 West Georgia	University Stadium; Carrollton, GA	FloSports	L 14–49	1,974
November 5	12:00 p.m.	North Greenville	Barron Stadium; Rome, GA	FloSports	W 31–14	1,187
November 12	3:00 p.m.	at Valdosta State*	Bazemore–Hyder Stadium; Valdosta, GA	FloSports	L 28-30	2,288
*Non-conference game; Rankings from AFCA Poll released prior to the game; All times are in Eastern time
