= 2017 Little All-America college football team =

The 2017 Little All-America college football team is composed of college football players from Division II, III, and NAIA schools who were selected by the Associated Press (AP) as the best players at each position. It was the first year that the AP named separate All-America teams for Division II, III, and NAIA.

== NCAA Division II First team ==
Position	Player	Team
Offense
Quarterback	Luis Perez	Texas A&M–Commerce
Running back	Marc Jones	Gannon
Running back	Cameron Mayberry	Colorado Mines
Wide receiver	Weston Carr	Azusa Pacific
Wide receiver	J.T. Luper	Central Oklahoma
Tight end	D.J. Cornish	Shepherd
Offensive line	Alex Cappa	Humboldt State
Offensive line	Gavin De Los Santos	Harding
Offensive line	Dominic Giunta	Ashland
Offensive line	Lavonte Hights	Shepherd
Offensive line	Harley Vaughn	West Georgia
Defense
Defensive line	Bo Banner	Central Washington
Defensive line	Adonis Davis	Florida Tech
Defensive line	Myles Humphrey	Shepherd
Defensive line	Marcus Martin	Slippery Rock
Linebacker	Dennis Gardeck	Sioux Falls
Linebacker	Kevin Haynes	Central Washington
Linebacker	Terry Samuel	West Alabama
Defensive back	Tyler Hasty	Central Washington
Defensive back	Chris Johnson	North Alabama
Defensive back	Tavierre Thomas	Ferris State
Defensive back	J.R. Stevens	Indiana (Pa.)
Special Teams
Kicker	Casey Bednarski	Minnesota State
Punter	Justin Marcha	Emporia State
All-purpose	Devontae Jackson	West Georgia

== NCAA Division III First team ==
Position	Player	Team
Offense
Quarterback	Brett Kasper	Wisconsin–Oshkosh
Running back	Austin Breunig	North Central
Running back	John Smith	Husson
Wide receiver	Nick Holcomb	Wisconsin–La Crosse
Wide receiver	Jesse Zubik	Washington & Jefferson
Tight end	Jacob Maher	Worcester State
Offensive line	Corbin Campitelli	Mary Hardin–Baylor
Offensive line	Matt Gono	Wesley
Offensive line	Cole Parrish	Mount Union
Offensive line	Vic Rodriguez	Hardin–Simmons
Offensive line	Ty Summers	Wisconsin–Oshkosh
Defense
Defensive line	Haston Adams	Mary Hardin–Baylor
Defensive line	Mike Riley	Rose–Hulman
Defensive line	Niles Scott	Frostburg State
Defensive line	Mamadou Soumahoro	Berry
Linebacker	Jordan Hassan	Illinois Wesleyan
Linebacker	Darin Hungerford	Kean
Linebacker	Ty Parsons	East Texas Baptist
Defensive back	O’Shea Anderson	Washington & Jefferson
Defensive back	Kris Brown	Mary Hardin–Baylor
Defensive back	Michael Joseph	Dubuque
Defensive back	Jake O’Connell	Brockport
Special Teams
Kicker	Willy Warne	Linfield
Punter	Tyler Kohman	Carnegie–Mellon
All-purpose	Bryce Wilkerson	Mary Hardin–Baylor

== NAIA First team ==
Position	Player	Team
Offense
Quarterback	Tanner Trosin	Southern Oregon
Running back	Bubba Jenkins	Morningside
Running back	Justin Green	St. Francis (IN)
Wide receiver	Hayden Adams	Dakota Wesleyan
Wide receiver	Connor Niles	Morningside
Tight end	Trenton Poe-Evans	Kansas Wesleyan
Offensive line	Trae Bradburn	Morningside
Offensive line	Justin Hunter	St. Xavier
Offensive line	Trey Coney	Reinhardt
Offensive line	Chris Emter	Carroll College
Offensive line	Xavier Carter	Reinhardt
Defense
Defensive line	Jamarae Finnie	Langston
Defensive line	Evan Sprayberry	Tabor
Defensive line	Tevin McCoy	Reinhardt
Defensive line	Resean Coleman	William Penn
Linebacker	Caden McDonald	Morningside
Linebacker	Piercen Harnish	St. Francis (IN)
Linebacker	Thomas Sease	Dickinson State
Defensive back	Darius Price	Siena Heights
Defensive back	Tomunci Whitfield	Southwestern (KS)
Defensive back	Tarence Roby	Concordia (NE)
Defensive back	Nate Moore	College of Idaho
Special Teams
Kicker	Daniel Martinez	Wayland Baptist
Punter	Derek Brush	Arizona Christian
All-purpose	Charles Ducksworth	Point

== See also ==
- 2017 College Football All-America Team
