= 2017 Delta State Statesmen football team =

American college football season

2017 Delta State Statesmen football
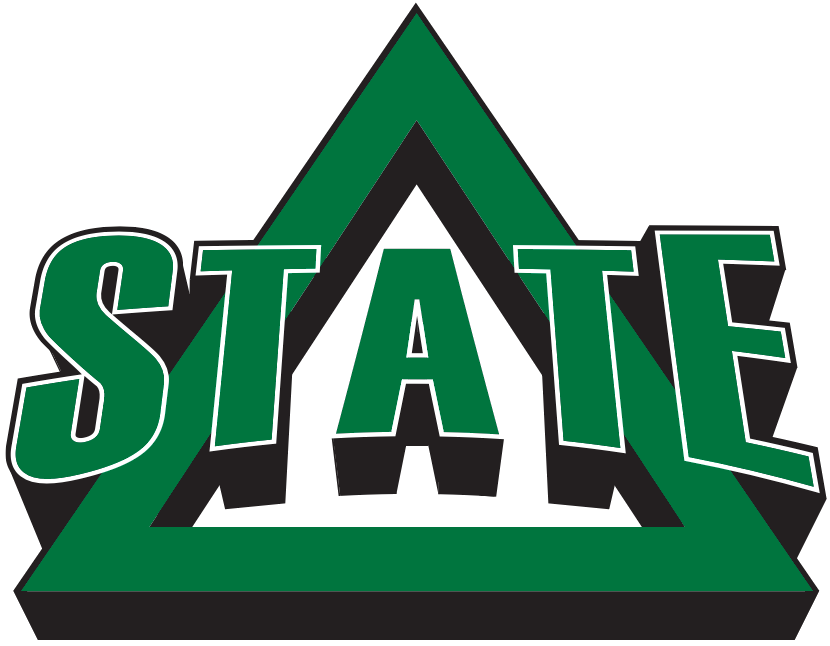
- Conference: Gulf South Conference

Ranking
- Coaches: No. 21
- Record: 9–4 (5–3 GSC)
- Head coach: Todd Cooley (5th season)
- Offensive coordinator: Joel Williams (5th season)
- Defensive coordinator: Jerry Partridge (1st season)
- Home stadium: Parker Field at Horace McCool Stadium

2017 Gulf South Conference football standings
	Conf.			Overall
Team	W		L	W		L
No. 12 West Alabama $^	7	–	1	10	–	3
No. 2 West Florida ^	5	–	3	11	–	4
No. 21 Delta State ^	5	–	3	9	–	4
No. 19 West Georgia ^	5	–	3	9	–	4
Valdosta State	5	–	3	5	–	4
North Alabama	5	–	3	5	–	5
Florida Tech	3	–	5	5	–	6
Mississippi College	1	–	7	1	–	9
Shorter	0	–	8	0	–	11
$ – Conference champion; ^ – NCAA Division II playoff participant; Rankings from AFCA Poll

The 2017 Delta State Statesmen football team represented Delta State University in the 2017 NCAA Division II football season. They were led by fifth-year head coach Todd Cooley. The Statesmen played their home games at McCool Stadium and were members of the Gulf South Conference. They advanced to the Division II Football Championship playoffs, where they were eliminated in the second round by West Alabama.

== Schedule ==
Delta State announced its 2017 football schedule on December 27, 2016 which consists of six home and five away games in the regular season. The Statesmen will host GSC foes Florida Tech, Valdosta State, West Alabama and West Georgia, and will travel to Mississippi College, North Alabama, Shorter, and West Florida.

The Statesmen will host two of the three non-conference games against Chowan of the Central Intercollegiate Athletic Association and Tarleton State of the Lone Star Conference and will travel to North Greenville whom is independent from a conference.

Date	Time	Opponent	Rank	Site	TV	Result	Attendance
September 2	2:00 p.m	Tarleton State*		Mickey Sellers Field; Cleveland, MS		W 34–16	5,155
September 9	2:00 p.m.	Chowan*		McCool Stadium; Cleveland, MS		W 42-13	5,255
September 16	2:00 p.m.	No. 17 West Georgia	No. 24	McCool Stadium; Cleveland, MS		W 17-7	5,255
September 23	12:00 p.m.	at Shorter	No. 17	Barron Stadium; Rome, GA	ESPN3	W 54-20	1,100
September 30	7:00 p.m.	at Mississippi College	No. 13	Robinson-Hale Stadium; Clinton, MS (Rivalry)	ESPN3	W 30-17	6,348
October 7	6:00 p.m.	West Alabama	No. 9	McCool Stadium; Cleveland, MS		L 26-29	7,856
October 14	4:00 p.m.	at West Florida	No. 21	Blue Wahoos Stadium; Pensacola, FL		W 28-25	5,458
October 21	2:00 p.m.	Valdosta State	No. 19	McCool Stadium; Cleveland, MS		L 13-34	3,451
October 28	6:00 p.m.	at North Alabama		Braly Municipal Stadium; Florence, AL		L 7-20	6,033
November 4	1:30 p.m.	at North Greenville*		Younts Stadium; Tigerville, SC		W 33-30 ^{OT}	3,033
November 11	2:00 p.m.	Florida Tech^{†}		McCool Stadium; Cleveland, MS	ESPN3	W 42-20	6,555
November 18	10:00 a.m.	at No. 14 Bowie State*		Bulldogs Stadium; Bowie, MD (Division II Playoffs First Round)		W 45-35	2,214
November 25	12:00 p.m.	at No. 17 West Alabama*		Tiger Stadium; Livingston, AL (Division II Playoffs Second Round)		L 20-27	4,893
*Non-conference game; ^{†}Homecoming; Rankings from Coaches' Poll released prior to the game; All times are in Central time

== Rankings ==
Ranking movements Legend: ██ Increase in ranking ██ Decrease in ranking — = Not ranked RV = Received votes
	Week												
Poll	Pre	1	2	3	4	5	6	7	8	9	10	11	Final
AFCA	RV	RV	24	17	13	9	21	19	RV	—	RV	RV	21
