= 2017 Valdosta State Blazers football team =

American college football season

2017 Valdosta State Blazers football
- Conference: Gulf South Conference
- Record: 5–4 (5–3 GSC)
- Head coach: Kerwin Bell (2nd season)
- Defensive coordinator: Danny Verpaele (1st season)
- Home stadium: Bazemore–Hyder Stadium

2017 Gulf South Conference football standings
	Conf.			Overall
Team	W		L	W		L
No. 12 West Alabama $^	7	–	1	10	–	3
No. 2 West Florida ^	5	–	3	11	–	4
No. 21 Delta State ^	5	–	3	9	–	4
No. 19 West Georgia ^	5	–	3	9	–	4
Valdosta State	5	–	3	5	–	4
North Alabama	5	–	3	5	–	5
Florida Tech	3	–	5	5	–	6
Mississippi College	1	–	7	1	–	9
Shorter	0	–	8	0	–	11
$ – Conference champion; ^ – NCAA Division II playoff participant; Rankings from AFCA Poll

The 2017 Valdosta State Blazers football team represented Valdosta State University as a member of the Gulf South Conference (GSC) during the 2017 NCAA Division II football season. They were led by second-year head coach Kerwin Bell and played their home games at Bazemore–Hyder Stadium in Valdosta, Georgia. Valdosta State compiled an overall record of 5–4 with a mark of 5–3 in conference play, placing in a five-way tie for second in the GSC.

== Schedule ==
Valdosta State announced its 2017 football schedule on March 17, 2017. The schedule consisted of four home games, five away games, and one neutral site game in the regular season. The Blazers hosted GSC foes Florida Tech, Mississippi College, North Alabama, and West Alabama and traveled to Delta State, Shorter, West Florida, and West Georgia.

The Blazers were scheduled to travel to both non-conference games, which were against Albany State of the Southern Intercollegiate Athletic Conference (SAIC) a neutral site game against Fort Valley State, also from the SIAC.

Date	Time	Opponent	Rank	Site	TV	Result	Attendance
September 2	7:00 p.m.	at Albany State*	No. 11	Albany State University Coliseum; Albany, GA		L 12–29	4,011
September 9	7:00 p.m.	vs. Fort Valley State*		Memorial Stadium; Waycross, GA (Okefenokee Classic)		Canceled^{[a]}	
September 16	7:00 p.m.	No. 10 North Alabama		Bazemore–Hyder Stadium; Valdosta, GA	ESPN3	L 24–30	4,191
September 23	7:00 p.m.	at West Florida		Blue Wahoos Stadium; Pensacola, FL		W 30–19	5,416
October 7	2:00 p.m.	at No. 25 West Georgia		University Stadium; Carrollton, GA (rivalry)	ESPN3	L 13–42	4,927
October 14	7:00 p.m.	Mississippi College		Bazemore–Hyder Stadium; Valdosta, GA	ESPN3	W 55–3	4,455
October 21	3:00 p.m.	No. 19 Delta State		McCool Stadium; Cleveland, MS		W 34–13	3,451
October 28	7:00 p.m.	Florida Tech		Bazemore–Hyder Stadium; Valdosta, GA		W 42–14	3,018
November 4	3:00 p.m.	No. 23 West Alabama^{†}		Bazemore–Hyder Stadium; Valdosta, GA		L 14–38	5,921
November 11	1:30 p.m.	Shorter		Barron Stadium; Rome, GA		W 52–0	1,100
*Non-conference game; ^{†}Homecoming; Rankings from American Football Coaches Association Poll released prior to the game; All times are in Eastern time

^{^[a]}The game between Fort Valley State and Valdosta State was cancelled in advance of the arrival of Hurricane Irma.

== Rankings ==
Ranking movements Legend: ██ Increase in ranking ██ Decrease in ranking — = Not ranked RV = Received votes
	Week												
Poll	Pre	1	2	3	4	5	6	7	8	9	10	11	Final
AFCA	11	RV	RV	—	—	—	—	—	—	—	—	—	—
