= 2017 Mississippi College Choctaws football team =

American college football season

2017 Mississippi College Choctaws football
- Conference: Gulf South Conference
- Record: 1–9 (1–7 GSC)
- Head coach: John Bland (4th season)
- Defensive coordinator: Michael Collins (2nd season)
- Home stadium: Robinson-Hale Stadium

2017 Gulf South Conference football standings
	Conf.			Overall
Team	W		L	W		L
No. 12 West Alabama $^	7	–	1	10	–	3
No. 2 West Florida ^	5	–	3	11	–	4
No. 21 Delta State ^	5	–	3	9	–	4
No. 19 West Georgia ^	5	–	3	9	–	4
Valdosta State	5	–	3	5	–	4
North Alabama	5	–	3	5	–	5
Florida Tech	3	–	5	5	–	6
Mississippi College	1	–	7	1	–	9
Shorter	0	–	8	0	–	11
$ – Conference champion; ^ – NCAA Division II playoff participant; Rankings from AFCA Poll

The 2017 Mississippi College Choctaws football team represented the Mississippi College in the 2017 NCAA Division II football season. They were led by fourth-year head coach John Bland. The Choctaws played their home games at Robinson-Hale Stadium and were members of the Gulf South Conference.

== Schedule ==
Mississippi College announced its 2017 football schedule on June 19, 2017. The schedule consists of four home and six away games in the regular season. The Choctaws will host GSC foes Delta State, Florida Tech, Shorter, and West Georgia, and will travel to North Alabama, Valdosta State, West Alabama, and West Florida.

The Choctaws will travel to both non-conference games against Clark Atlanta of the Southern Intercollegiate Athletic Conference and Southwest Baptist of the Great Lakes Valley Conference.

Date	Time	Opponent	Site	TV	Result	Attendance
August 31	6:00 p.m	at Clark Atlanta*	Panther Stadium; Atlanta, GA		L 29–32 ^{OT}	1,200
September 9	6:00 p.m.	at Southwest Baptist*	Plaster Stadium; Bolivar, MO		L 9-32	3,028
September 16	6:00 p.m.	at West Alabama	Tiger Stadium; Livingston, AL		L 13-42	5,351
September 23	7:00 p.m.	Florida Tech	Robinson-Hale Stadium; Clinton, MS		L 0-35	3,934
September 30	7:00 p.m.	No. 13 Delta State	Robinson–Hale Stadium; Clinton, MS (Rivalry)	ESPN3	L 17-30	6,348
October 6	6:00 p.m.	at West Florida	Blue Wahoos Stadium; Pensacola, FL		L 14-28	4,976
October 14	6:00 p.m.	at Valdosta State	Bazemore–Hyder Stadium; Valdosta, GA	ESPN3	L 3-55	4,455
October 21	3:00 p.m.	West Georgia^{†}	Robinson–Hale Stadium; Clinton, MS		L 0-28	5,687
November 4	3:00 p.m.	Shorter	Robinson–Hale Stadium; Clinton, MS		W 30-29	3,054
November 11	1:30 p.m.	at North Alabama	Braly Municipal Stadium; Florence, AL		L 7-16	7,235
*Non-conference game; ^{†}Homecoming; Rankings from Coaches' Poll released prior to the game; All times are in Central time
