= 2017 Florida Tech Panthers football team =

American college football season

2017 Florida Tech Panthers football
- Conference: Gulf South Conference
- Record: 5–6 (3–5 GSC)
- Head coach: Steve Englehart (5th season)
- Offensive coordinator: Jayson Martin (5th season)
- Defensive coordinator: Rick Minter (1st season)
- Home stadium: Florida Tech Panther Stadium

2017 Gulf South Conference football standings
	Conf.			Overall
Team	W		L	W		L
No. 12 West Alabama $^	7	–	1	10	–	3
No. 2 West Florida ^	5	–	3	11	–	4
No. 21 Delta State ^	5	–	3	9	–	4
No. 19 West Georgia ^	5	–	3	9	–	4
Valdosta State	5	–	3	5	–	4
North Alabama	5	–	3	5	–	5
Florida Tech	3	–	5	5	–	6
Mississippi College	1	–	7	1	–	9
Shorter	0	–	8	0	–	11
$ – Conference champion; ^ – NCAA Division II playoff participant; Rankings from AFCA Poll

The 2017 Florida Tech Panthers football team represented Florida Institute of Technology (FIT) during the 2017 NCAA Division II football season. They were led by fifth-year head coach Steve Englehart. The Panthers played their home games at Florida Tech Panther Stadium, approximately one mile (1.6 km) from the Florida Tech campus, and were members of the Gulf South Conference.

== Schedule ==
Florida Tech announced its 2017 football schedule on April 11, 2017. The schedule consists of 5 home and 6 away games in the regular season. The Panthers will host GSC foes Shorter, West Alabama, West Florida, and West Georgia, and will travel to Delta State, Mississippi College, North Alabama, and Valdosta State.

The Panthers will host only one non-conference game against Virginia University of Lynchburg and travel to McNeese State of the Southland Conference and North Greenville whom is independent from a conference.

Date	Time	Opponent	Site	TV	Result	Attendance
September 2	7:00 p.m.	VUL*	Florida Tech Panther Stadium; Melbourne, FL		W 44–0	1,230
September 9	7:00 p.m.	at McNeese State*	Cowboy Stadium; Lake Charles, LA		L 21–42	11,101
September 16	7:00 p.m.	Shorter	Florida Tech Panther Stadium; Melbourne, FL		W 31–6	1,450
September 23	8:00 p.m.	at Mississippi College	Robinson-Hale Stadium; Clinton, MS		W 35–0	3,934
September 30	7:00 p.m.	West Florida	Florida Tech Panther Stadium; Melbourne, FL (Coastal Classic)	ESPN3	L 21–23	3,422
October 7	7:00 p.m.	at North Alabama	Braly Municipal Stadium; Florence, AL		L 7–30	7,002
October 14	12:00 p.m.	at North Greenville*	Younts Stadium; Tigerville, SC		W 42–31	2,400
October 21	2:00 p.m.	No. 18 West Alabama	Florida Tech Panther Stadium; Melbourne, FL	ESPN3	W 41–39	2,900
October 28	7:00 p.m.	at Valdosta State	Bazemore–Hyder Stadium; Valdosta, GA		L 14–42	3,018
November 4	1:00 p.m.	No. 25 West Georgia^{†}	Florida Tech Panther Stadium; Melbourne, FL		L 13–20	3,800
November 11	3:00 p.m.	at Delta State	McCool Stadium; Cleveland, MS	ESPN3	L 20–42	6,555
*Non-conference game; ^{†}Homecoming; Rankings from Coaches' Poll released prior to the game; All times are in Eastern time

== Rankings ==
Ranking movements Legend: ██ Increase in ranking ██ Decrease in ranking — = Not ranked RV = Received votes
	Week												
Poll	Pre	1	2	3	4	5	6	7	8	9	10	11	Final
AFCA	RV	RV	RV	RV	RV	—	—	—	—	—	—	—	—

== Game summaries ==
=== Virginia-Lynchburg ===
	1	2	3	4	Total
Dragons	0	0	0	0	0
Panthers	3	7	14	20	44

=== At McNeese State ===
	1	2	3	4	Total
Panthers	0	7	14	0	21
Cowboys	14	7	7	14	42

=== Shorter ===
	1	2	3	4	Total
Hawks	6	0	0	0	6
Panthers	14	7	3	7	31

=== At Mississippi College ===
	1	2	3	4	Total
Panthers	7	0	14	14	35
Choctaws	0	0	0	0	0

=== West Florida ===
	1	2	3	4	Total
Argonauts	7	6	7	3	23
Panthers	7	7	7	0	21

=== At North Alabama ===
	1	2	3	4	Total
Panthers	7	0	0	0	7
Lions	3	0	21	6	30

=== At North Greenville ===
	1	2	3	4	Total
Panthers	7	21	7	7	42
Crusaders	7	10	14	0	31

=== West Alabama ===
	1	2	3	4	Total
Tigers	14	3	0	22	39
Panthers	7	13	7	14	41

=== At Valdosta State ===
	1	2	3	4	Total
Panthers	7	0	0	7	14
Blazers	0	14	14	14	42

=== West Georgia ===
	1	2	3	4	Total
Wolves	0	0	3	17	20
Panthers	6	0	0	7	13

=== At Delta State ===
	1	2	3	4	Total
Panthers	13	0	0	7	20
Statesmen	0	21	14	7	42

== Awards and milestones ==
=== Gulf South Conference honors ===
Five players from Florida Tech were honored as All-GSC selections by the league's coaches.

==== Gulf South Conference All-Conference First Team ====
- Antwuan Haynes, RB
- Adonis Davis, DL

==== Gulf South Conference All-Conference Second Team ====
- Romell Guerrier, WR
- Kevin Purlett, TE
- J.T. Hassell, LB

==== Gulf South Conference offensive player of the week ====
- September 18: Antwuan Haynes
- October 16: Mark Cato
- October 23: Mark Cato

==== Gulf South Conference defensive player of the week ====
- October 16: Adonis Davis

==== Gulf South Conference special teams player of the week ====
- September 4: Max Erdman
