= 2017 West Florida Argonauts football team =

American college football season

2017 West Florida Argonauts football

NCAA Division II Championship Game, L 27–37 vs. Texas A&M–Commerce
- Conference: Gulf South Conference

Ranking
- Coaches: No. 2
- Record: 11–4 (5–3 GSC)
- Head coach: Pete Shinnick (2nd season)
- Offensive coordinator: Jammie Deese (2nd season)
- Offensive scheme: Multiple
- Defensive coordinator: Darian Dulin (1st season)
- Base defense: 4–3
- Home stadium: Blue Wahoos Stadium

2017 Gulf South Conference football standings
	Conf.			Overall
Team	W		L	W		L
No. 12 West Alabama $^	7	–	1	10	–	3
No. 2 West Florida ^	5	–	3	11	–	4
No. 21 Delta State ^	5	–	3	9	–	4
No. 19 West Georgia ^	5	–	3	9	–	4
Valdosta State	5	–	3	5	–	4
North Alabama	5	–	3	5	–	5
Florida Tech	3	–	5	5	–	6
Mississippi College	1	–	7	1	–	9
Shorter	0	–	8	0	–	11
$ – Conference champion; ^ – NCAA Division II playoff participant; Rankings from AFCA poll

The 2017 West Florida Argonauts football team represented the University of West Florida in the 2017 NCAA Division II football season. They were led by second-year head coach Pete Shinnick. The Argonauts played their home games at Blue Wahoos Stadium and were members of the Gulf South Conference.

== Schedule ==
West Florida announced its 2017 football schedule on February 1, 2017. The schedule consists of 6 home and 5 away games in the regular season. The Argonauts will host GSC foes Delta State, Mississippi College, North Alabama, and Valdosta State, and will travel to Shorter, West Alabama, West Florida, and West Georgia.

The Argonauts will host two of the three non-conference game against Chowan of the Central Intercollegiate Athletic Association and Midwestern State of the Lone Star Conference and will travel to Missouri S&T of the Great Lakes Valley Conference.

Date	Time	Opponent	Site	TV	Result	Attendance
September 2	7:00 p.m	at Missouri S&T*	Allgood–Bailey Stadium; Rolla, MO		W 20–16	2,000
September 9	6:00 p.m.	No. 16 Midwestern State*	Blue Wahoos Stadium; Pensacola, FL		Cancelled^{[a]}	
September 16	6:00 p.m.	Chowan*	Blue Wahoos Stadium; Pensacola, FL	BLAB TV	W 51-23	4,554
September 23	6:00 p.m.	Valdosta State	Blue Wahoos Stadium; Pensacola, FL	BLAB TV	L 19-30	5,416
September 30	7:00 p.m.	at Florida Tech	Florida Tech Panther Stadium; Melbourne, FL	ESPN3	W 23-21	3,422
October 6	6:00 p.m.	Mississippi College	Blue Wahoos Stadium; Pensacola, FL	BLAB TV	W 28-14	4,976
October 14	4:00 p.m.	No. 21 Delta State^{†}	Blue Wahoos Stadium; Pensacola, FL	BLAB TV	L 25-28	5,458
October 21	1:00 p.m.	at Shorter	Barron Stadium; Rome, GA		W 42-29	1,075
October 28	4:00 p.m.	at No. 25 West Alabama	Tiger Stadium; Livingston, AL	ESPN3	L 18-35	6,999
November 4	4:00 p.m.	North Alabama	Blue Wahoos Stadium; Pensacola, FL	ESPN3	W 30-7	5,590
November 11	2:00 p.m.	at No. 24 West Georgia	University Stadium; Carrollton, GA		W 34-29	4,217
November 18	12:00 p.m.	at No. 16 Wingate*	Irwin Belk Stadium; Wingate, NC (Division II Playoffs First Round)	ESPN3	W 31-0	1,567
November 25	1:00 p.m.	at West Georgia	University Stadium; Carrollton, GA (Division II Playoffs Second Round)	BLAB TV	W 17-14	1,993
December 2	12:00 p.m.	at No. 17 West Alabama	Tiger Stadium; Livingston, AL (Division II Playoffs Quarterfinals)		W 28-21	6,105
December 9	12:00 p.m.	at No. 3 IUP*	Miller Stadium; Indiana, PA (Division II Playoffs Semifinals)	ESPN3	W 27-17	2,509
December 16	6:00 p.m.	vs. No. 8 Texas A&M-Commerce*	Children's Mercy Park; Kansas City, KS (Division II National Championship Game)	ESPN2	L 27-37	4,259
*Non-conference game; ^{†}Homecoming; Rankings from AFCA Poll released prior to the game; All times are in Central time

^{^[a]}The game between Midwestern State and West Florida was cancelled in advance of the arrival of Hurricane Irma.

== Rankings ==
Ranking movements Legend: ██ Increase in ranking ██ Decrease in ranking — = Not ranked RV = Received votes
	Week												
Poll	Pre	1	2	3	4	5	6	7	8	9	10	11	Final
AFCA	—	—	—	—	—	—	—	—	RV	—	—	RV	2

== Game summaries ==
=== Vs. No. 8 Texas A&M–Commerce (Division II Championship Game) ===
2017 NCAA Division II Championship Game
West Florida Argonauts vs. No. 8 Texas A&M–Commerce Lions

Quarter	1	2	3	4	Total
Argonauts	7	7	6	7	27
No. 8 Lions	14	6	14	3	37

at Children's Mercy Park, Kansas City, Kansas

- Date: December 16
- Game time: 6:00 p.m. EST / 5:00 p.m. CST
- Game weather: Clear, 61 °F (16 °C)
- Game attendance: 4,259
- Referee: Dwight Neibling
- TV: ESPN2
- Box score, Recap

Game information

First quarter

- TAMUC – Shawn Hooks 50-yard pass from Luis Perez (Kristov Martinez kick), 11:52. Lions 7–0. Drive: 7 plays, 97 yards, 3:08.
- UWF – Chris Schwarz 1-yard run (Austin Williams kick), 2:24. Tied 7–7. Drive: 10 plays, 49 yards, 4:45.
- TAMUC – Reggie Kincade 99-yard kick return (Kristov Martinez kick), 2:10. Lions 14–7.

Second quarter

- TAMUC – Kristov Martinez 29-yard field goal, 13:42. Lions 17–7. Drive: 6 plays, 70 yards, 2:21.
- TAMUC – Kristov Martinez 29-yard field goal, 8:51. Lions 20–7. Drive: 8 plays, 25 yards, 3:57.
- UWF – Antoine Griffin 20-yard pass from Mike Beaudry (Austin Williams kick), 0:58. Lions 20–14. Drive: 10 plays, 77 yards, 2:51.

Third quarter

- UWF – Austin Williams 27-yard field goal, 10:03. Lions 20–17. Drive: 4 plays, -5 yards, 1:58.
- TAMUC – E.J. Thompson 9-yard run (Kristov Martinez kick), 6:08. Lions 27–17. Drive: 10 plays, 62 yards, 3:52.
- UWF – Austin Williams 47-yard field goal, 1:57. Lions 27–20. Drive: 4 plays, 8 yards, 1:14.
- TAMUC – Marquis Wimberly 40-yard pass from Luis Perez (Kristov Martinez kick), 0:30. Lions 34–20. Drive: 4 plays, 61 yards, 1:21.

Fourth quarter

- TAMUC – Kristov Martinez 19-yard field goal, 7:41. Lions 37–20. Drive: 10 plays, 86 yards, 5:34.
- UWF – Chris Schwarz 3-yard run (Austin Williams kick), 4:45. Lions 37–27. Drive: 8 plays, 75 yards, 2:55.

Statistics	UWF	TAMUC
First downs	20	24
Total yards	276	477
Rushing yards	24	154
Passing yards	252	323
Turnovers	1	4
Time of possession	27:35	32:25

Team	Category	Player	Statistics
West Florida	Passing	Mike Beaury	22/48, 252 yards, TD, INT
West Florida	Rushing	Chris Schwarz	14 rushes, 45 yards, 2 TD
West Florida	Receiving	Antoine Griffin	8 receptions, 112 yards, TD
Texas A&M–Commerce	Passing	Luis Perez	23/30, 323 yards, 2 TD, INT
Texas A&M–Commerce	Rushing	E. J. Thompson	21 rushes, 110 yards, TD
Texas A&M–Commerce	Receiving	Shawn Hooks	4 receptions, 104 yards, TD
