= 2017 West Alabama Tigers football team =

American college football season

2017 West Alabama Tigers football
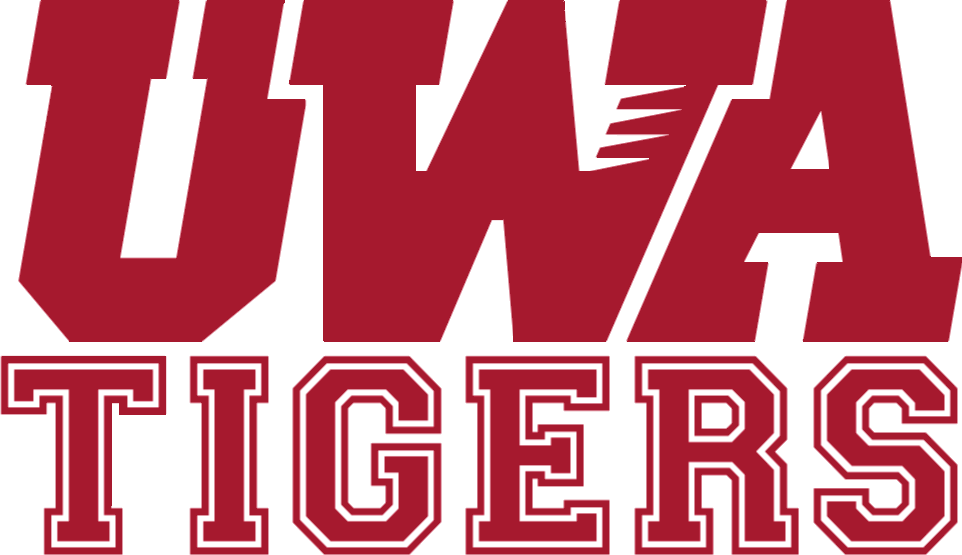

GSC champion

NCAA Division II Quarterfinal, L 21–28 vs. West Florida
- Conference: Gulf South Conference

Ranking
- AFCA: No. 12
- Record: 10–3 (7–1 GSC)
- Head coach: Brett Gilliland (4th season)
- Offensive coordinator: Don Bailey (2nd season)
- Defensive coordinator: Steve Sisa (1st season)
- Home stadium: Tiger Stadium

2017 Gulf South Conference football standings
	Conf.			Overall
Team	W		L	W		L
No. 12 West Alabama $^	7	–	1	10	–	3
No. 2 West Florida ^	5	–	3	11	–	4
No. 21 Delta State ^	5	–	3	9	–	4
No. 19 West Georgia ^	5	–	3	9	–	4
Valdosta State	5	–	3	5	–	4
North Alabama	5	–	3	5	–	5
Florida Tech	3	–	5	5	–	6
Mississippi College	1	–	7	1	–	9
Shorter	0	–	8	0	–	11
$ – Conference champion; ^ – NCAA Division II playoff participant; Rankings from AFCA Poll

The 2017 West Alabama Tigers football team represented the University of West Alabama in the 2017 NCAA Division II football season. They were led by fourth-year head coach Brett Gilliland. The Tigers played their home games at Tiger Stadium and were members of the Gulf South Conference.

== Schedule ==
West Alabama announced its 2017 football schedule on January 13, 2017. The schedule consists of both five home and six away games in the regular season. The Tigers hosted GSC foes Mississippi College, Shorter, West Florida, and West Georgia and traveled to Delta State, Florida Tech, North Alabama, and Valdosta State

The Tigers only hosted one of the three non-conference games against North Greenville which is independent from a conference and traveled to two games against Lenoir-Rhyne from the South Atlantic Conference and Samford from the Southern Conference.

Date	Time	Opponent	Rank	Site	TV	Result	Attendance
August 31	6:00 p.m.	at Lenoir–Rhyne*		Moretz Stadium; Hickory, NC		W 46–7	2,555
September 7	6:00 p.m.	at No. 17 (FCS) Samford*		Seibert Stadium; Homewood, AL	ESPN3	L 41–49	4,509
September 16	6:00 p.m.	Mississippi College		Tiger Stadium; Livingston, AL		W 42–13	5,351
September 23	6:00 p.m.	at No. 10 North Alabama		Braly Municipal Stadium; Florence, AL (rivalry)		W 38–17	10,327
September 30	6:00 p.m.	Shorter		Tiger Stadium; Livingston, AL		W 62–0	4,324
October 7	6:00 p.m.	at No. 9 Delta State		McCool Stadium; Cleveland, MS		W 29–26	7,856
October 14	4:00 p.m.	No. 22 West Georgia	No. 23	Tiger Stadium; Livingston, AL		W 34–31	3,321
October 21	1:00 p.m.	at Florida Tech	No. 18	Florida Tech Panther Stadium; Melbourne, FL	ESPN3	L 39–41	2,900
October 28	4:00 p.m.	West Florida^{†}	No. 25	Tiger Stadium; Livingston, AL	ESPN3	W 35–18	6,999
November 4	2:00 p.m.	Valdosta State	No. 23	Bazemore–Hyder Stadium; Valdosta, GA		W 38–14	5,921
November 11	2:00 p.m.	North Greenville*	No. 22	Tiger Stadium; Livingston, AL		W 29–26	5,481
November 25	12:00 p.m.	Delta State*	No. 17	Tiger Stadium; Livingston, AL (NCAA Division II Second Round)		W 27–20	4,893
December 2	12:00 p.m.	West Florida*	No. 17	Tiger Stadium; Livingston, AL (NCAA Division II Quarterfinal)		L 21–28	6,105
*Non-conference game; ^{†}Homecoming; Rankings from AFCA Poll released prior to the game; All times are in Central time

== Rankings ==
Ranking movements Legend: ██ Increase in ranking ██ Decrease in ranking — = Not ranked RV = Received votes
	Week												
Poll	Pre	1	2	3	4	5	6	7	8	9	10	11	Final
AFCA	—	—	—	—	RV	RV	23	18	25	23	22	17	12
