= 2017 North Alabama Lions football team =

American college football season

2017 North Alabama Lions football
- Conference: Gulf South Conference
- Record: 5–5 (5–3 GSC)
- Head coach: Chris Willis (1st season)
- Offensive coordinator: Steadman Campbell (2nd season)
- Defensive coordinator: Brett Borden (1st season)
- Home stadium: Braly Municipal Stadium

2017 Gulf South Conference football standings
	Conf.			Overall
Team	W		L	W		L
No. 12 West Alabama $^	7	–	1	10	–	3
No. 2 West Florida ^	5	–	3	11	–	4
No. 21 Delta State ^	5	–	3	9	–	4
No. 19 West Georgia ^	5	–	3	9	–	4
Valdosta State	5	–	3	5	–	4
North Alabama	5	–	3	5	–	5
Florida Tech	3	–	5	5	–	6
Mississippi College	1	–	7	1	–	9
Shorter	0	–	8	0	–	11
$ – Conference champion; ^ – NCAA Division II playoff participant; Rankings from AFCA poll

The 2017 North Alabama Lions football team represented the University of North Alabama as a member of the Gulf South Conference (GSC) during the 2017 NCAA Division II football season. Led by first-year head coach Chris Willis, the Lions compiled an overall record of 5–5 with a mark of 5–3 in conference play, placing in a five-way tie for second in the GSC. North Alabama played home games at Braly Municipal Stadium in Florence, Alabama.

This was North Alabama 's final season as a member of the GSC and NCAA Division II as they began a transition NCAA Division I Football Championship Subdivision (FCS), first as an independent in 2018 before joining the Big South Conference in 2019.

== Schedule ==
North Alabama announced its 2017 football schedule on April 12, 2017. The schedule consists of five home and five away games in the regular season.

Date	Time	Opponent	Rank	Site	TV	Result	Attendance
September 1 (Note: Game was originally scheduled for August 31, but postponed due to Hurricane Harvey.)	6:00 p.m	No. 5 Texas A&M–Commerce*	No. 6	Braly Municipal Stadium; Florence, AL		L 7–8	6,892
September 16	6:00 p.m.	at Valdosta State	No. 10	Bazemore–Hyder Stadium; Valdosta, GA	ESPN3	W 30–24	4,191
September 23	6:00 p.m.	West Alabama	No. 11	Braly Municipal Stadium; Florence, AL (rivalry)		L 17–38	10,327
September 30	1:00 p.m.	at West Georgia		University Stadium; Carrollton, GA		L 23–37	4,273
October 7	6:00 p.m.	Florida Tech^{†}		Braly Municipal Stadium; Florence, AL		W 30–7	7,002
October 14	12:00 p.m.	at Shorter		Barron Stadium; Rome, GA		W 48–0	1,118
October 21	3:00 p.m.	at No. 9 Central Washington*		Tomlinson Stadium; Ellensburg, WA		L 10–17	3,719
October 28	6:00 p.m.	Delta State		Braly Municipal Stadium; Florence, AL		W 20–7	6,033
November 4	4:00 p.m.	at West Florida		Blue Wahoos Stadium; Pensacola, FL	ESPN3	L 7–30	5,590
November 11	1:30 p.m.	Mississippi College		Braly Municipal Stadium; Florence, AL		W 16–7	7,235
*Non-conference game; ^{†}Homecoming; Rankings from AFCA Poll released prior to the game; All times are in Central time

== Rankings ==
Ranking movements Legend: ██ Increase in ranking ██ Decrease in ranking — = Not ranked RV = Received votes
	Week												
Poll	Pre	1	2	3	4	5	6	7	8	9	10	11	Final
AFCA	6	11	10	10	RV	—	—	—	—	—	—	—	—
