= Chris Willis (American football) =

American football player and coach (born 1974)

Biographical details
- Born: February 2, 1974 (age 52); Aberdeen, Mississippi, U.S.
- Education: Delta State

Playing career
- 1995–1996: Itawamba CC
- Position: Pitcher

Coaching career (HC unless noted)
- 1999: Delta State (GA)
- 2000–2001: Delta State (assistant)
- 2002: North Alabama (TE)
- 2003: North Alabama (RB)
- 2004–2011: North Alabama (DB)
- 2012–2016: North Alabama (DC)
- 2017–2022: North Alabama

Head coaching record
- Overall: 20–34

Chris Willis (born February 2, 1974) is an American football coach. He was recently the head football coach at the University of North Alabama. Willis was named as the 10th head football coach in North Alabama history on December 22, 2016. Willis previously served under head coaches Mark Hudspeth, Terry Bowden and Bobby Wallace with the Lions. Willis was fired midway through the 2022 season, following a 1–7 start, after over twenty years with the program.

== Head coaching record ==
| Year | Team | Overall | Conference | Standing | Bowl/playoffs |
|---|---|---|---|---|---|
North Alabama Lions (Gulf South Conference) (2017)
| 2017 | North Alabama | 5–5 | 5–3 | 6th | |
North Alabama Lions (NCAA Division I FCS independent) (2018)
| 2018 | North Alabama | 7–3 | | | |
North Alabama Lions (Big South Conference) (2019–2021)
| 2019 | North Alabama | 4–7 | 0–0 | N/A | |
| 2020–21 | North Alabama | 0–4 (Note: North Alabama opted to play non-conference games in the fall as an independent, and declined to play in the spring season as a part of the Big South conference season.) | | | |
| 2021 | North Alabama | 3–8 | 3–4 | T–3rd | |
North Alabama Lions (ASUN Conference) (2022)
| 2022 | North Alabama | 1–7 (Note: North Alabama fired Willis with 3 games left in the season.) | 0–4 | | |
| North Alabama: | | 20–34 | 8–11 | | |
| Total: | | 20–34 | | | |
