= Zach Morrison =

American football coach

Current position
- Title: Head coach
- Team: Shorter
- Conference: Carolinas
- Record: 17–63

Biographical details
- Born: Cumming, Georgia, U.S.

Playing career
- 2005–2008: Shorter
- Position: Offensive lineman

Coaching career (HC unless noted)

Football
- 2009–2011: Coosa HS (GA) (OL)
- 2012: Commerce HS (GA) (OL)
- 2013–2015: Statesboro HS (GA) (OL)
- 2016–2017: Kennesaw Mountain HS (GA) (OL)
- 2018–present: Shorter

Wrestling
- 2009–2011: Coosa HS (GA)
- 2012: Commerce HS (GA)
- 2013–2015: Statesboro HS (GA)
- 2016: Kennesaw Mountain HS (GA)

Head coaching record
- Overall: 17–63 (football)

Zach Morrison is an American college football coach and former player. He is the head football coach for Shorter University, a position he has held since 2018. In January 2018, he was named the third head football coach at Shorter University in Rome, Georgia.

== Playing career ==
Morrison was a four year starter on the offensive line and a member of Shorter's inaugural team under head coach Phil Jones.

== Coaching career ==
Morrison made the transition from assistant coach at the high school level to head coach at the collegiate level. He served as both an assistant football coach as well as a wrestling coach at Kennesaw Mountain High School in Kennesaw, Georgia before being hired at Shorter.

Morrison also served as a coach at Statesboro High School, East Jackson High School, and Coosa High School.

== Head coaching record ==
=== Football ===
Year	Team	Overall	Conference	Standing	Bowl/playoffs
Shorter Hawks (Gulf South Conference) (2018–2023)
2018	Shorter	0–11	0–8	9th	
2019	Shorter	1–10	0–8	9th	
2020–21	Shorter	2–2	0–0	N/A	
2021	Shorter	3–8	0–7	8th	
2022	Shorter	3–8	1–6	8th	
2023	Shorter	3–8	1–7	8th	
Shorter Hawks (NCAA Division II independent) (2024)
2024	Shorter	3–7			
Shorter Hawks (Conference Carolinas) (2025–present)
2025	Shorter	2–9	1–5	T–6th	
Shorter:		17–63	3–41		
Total:		17–63			
