= 2017 West Georgia Wolves football team =

American college football season

2017 West Georgia Wolves football
- Conference: Gulf South Conference

Ranking
- Coaches: No. 19
- Record: 7–3 (4–3 GSC)
- Head coach: David Dean (1st season)
- Offensive coordinator: Sam Gregg (4th season)
- Defensive coordinator: Scott Symons (4th season)
- Home stadium: University Stadium

2017 Gulf South Conference football standings
	Conf.			Overall
Team	W		L	W		L
No. 12 West Alabama $^	7	–	1	10	–	3
No. 2 West Florida ^	5	–	3	11	–	4
No. 21 Delta State ^	5	–	3	9	–	4
No. 19 West Georgia ^	5	–	3	9	–	4
Valdosta State	5	–	3	5	–	4
North Alabama	5	–	3	5	–	5
Florida Tech	3	–	5	5	–	6
Mississippi College	1	–	7	1	–	9
Shorter	0	–	8	0	–	11
$ – Conference champion; ^ – NCAA Division II playoff participant; Rankings from AFCA Poll

The 2017 West Georgia Wolves football team represented the University of West Georgia in the 2017 NCAA Division II football season. They were led by first-year head coach David Dean. The Wolves played their home games at University Stadium and were members of the Gulf South Conference.

== Schedule ==
West Georgia announced its 2017 football schedule on February 14, 2017. The schedule consists of 7 home and 4 away games in the regular season. The Wolves will host GSC foes North Alabama, Shorter, Valdosta State, and West Florida, and will travel to Delta State, Florida Tech, Mississippi College, and West Alabama.

The Wolves will host all three non-conference game against Fort Valley State, Albany State and Miles, which all three are from the Southern Intercollegiate Athletic Conference.

Date	Time	Opponent	Rank	Site	TV	Result	Attendance
August 31	7:00 p.m	Fort Valley State*		University Stadium; Carrollton, GA		W 34–9	4,836
September 9	7:00 p.m.	Miles*	No. 25	University Stadium; Carrollton, GA		W 45-7	5,382
September 16	7:00 p.m.	No. 24 Delta State	No. 17	McCool Stadium; Cleveland, MS		L 7-17	5,255
September 23	2:00 p.m.	Albany State*^{†}		University Stadium; Carrollton, GA		W 48-16	6,838
September 30	2:00 p.m.	North Alabama		University Stadium; Carrollton, GA		W 37-23	4,273
October 7	2:00 p.m.	Valdosta State	No. 25	University Stadium; Carrollton, GA (Rivalry)	ESPN3	W 42-13	4,927
October 14	5:00 p.m.	at No. 23 West Alabama	No. 22	Tiger Stadium; Livingston, AL		L 31-34	3,321
October 21	3:00 p.m.	at Mississippi College		Robinson-Hale Stadium; Clinton, MS		W 28-0	5,687
October 26	7:00 p.m.	Shorter		University Stadium; Carrollton, GA	ESPN3	W 42-6	3,167
November 4	1:00 p.m.	at Florida Tech	No. 25	Florida Tech Panther Stadium; Melbourne, FL		W 20-13	3,800
November 11	2:00 p.m.	West Florida	No. 24	University Stadium; Carrollton, GA		L 29-34	4,217
November 18	12:00 p.m.	at No. 11 Virginia State*		Rogers Stadium; Petersburg, VA (Division II Playoffs First Round)		W 35-9	2,102
November 25	1:00 p.m.	West Florida*		University Stadium; Carrollton, GA (Division II Playoffs Second Round)		L 14-17	1,993
*Non-conference game; ^{†}Homecoming; Rankings from Coaches' Poll released prior to the game; All times are in Eastern time

== Rankings ==
Ranking movements Legend: ██ Increase in ranking ██ Decrease in ranking RV = Received votes
	Week												
Poll	Pre	1	2	3	4	5	6	7	8	9	10	11	Final
AFCA	RV	25	17	RV	RV	25	22	RV	RV	25	24	RV	19
