= John Bland (American football) =

American football player and coach

Current position
- Title: Quarterbacks coach
- Team: Catholic HS (AR)

Biographical details
- Born: January 30, 1967 (age 59); Knoxville, Tennessee, U.S.
- Education: University of Arkansas (1989)

Playing career
- 1985–1988: Arkansas
- Position: Quarterback

Coaching career (HC unless noted)
- 1989: Arkansas (SA)
- 1990–1991: Auburn (GA)
- 1992–1993: Columbia Central HS (TN) (RB/DB)
- 1994–1996: Southern Arkansas (QB)
- 1997–1999: Southern Arkansas (OC/QB)
- 2000: Southern Arkansas
- 2001–2005: Rice (QB)
- 2006–2013: Cumberlands (KY)
- 2014–2023: Mississippi College
- 2024–present: Catholic HS (AR) (QB)

Head coaching record
- Overall: 101–92
- Tournaments: 5–6 (NAIA playoffs)

Accomplishments and honors

Championships
- 3 MSC East Division (2008–2009, 2013); 3 MSC West Division (2010)

Awards
- 5× MSC Coach of the Year; GSC Coach of the Year (2019)

John Malcolm Bland (born January 30, 1967) is an American college football coach. He is the quarterbacks coach for the Catholic High School for Boys, a position he has held since 2024. He served as the head football coach at Southern Arkansas University in 2000, the University of the Cumberlands in Williamsburg, Kentucky from 2005 to 2013 and Mississippi College from 2014 to 2023. Bland played football as a quarterback at the University of Arkansas from 1988 to 1991. He worked as the quarterbacks coach at Rice University from 2001 to 2005.

== Head coaching record ==
Year	Team	Overall	Conference	Standing	Bowl/playoffs	NAIA^{#}
Southern Arkansas Muleriders (Gulf South Conference) (2000)
2000	Southern Arkansas	5–5	4–5	T–6th		
Southern Arkansas:		5–5	4–5			
Cumberlands Patriots (Mid-South Conference) (2006–2013)
2006	Cumberlands	6–4	3–2	3rd (East)		
2007	Cumberlands	8–3	4–1	2nd (East)	L NAIA First Round	
2008	Cumberlands	10–2	6–0	1st (East)	L NAIA Quarterfinal	6
2009	Cumberlands	9–2	5–1	1st (East)	L NAIA First Round	11
2010	Cumberlands	7–4	5–1	1st (West)	L NAIA First Round	19
2011	Cumberlands	7–3	4–2	T–2nd (West)		24
2012	Cumberlands	10–2	4–1	2nd (East)	L NAIA Quarterfinal	7
2013	Cumberlands	13–1	6–0	1st (East)	L NAIA Championship	2
Cumberlands:		70–21	37–8			
Mississippi College Choctaws (Gulf South Conference) (2014–2023)
2014	Mississippi College	1–9	0–7	8th		
2015	Mississippi College	2–8	0–7	8th		
2016	Mississippi College	3–7	1–7	8th		
2017	Mississippi College	1–9	1–7	8th		
2018	Mississippi College	3–7	1–6	8th		
2019	Mississippi College	5–5	4–4	T–4th		
2020–21	Mississippi College	0–1	0–0	N/A		
2021	Mississippi College	4–6	2–5	T–6th		
2022	Mississippi College	4–7	3–4	T–4th		
2023	Mississippi College	3–7	2–6	7th		
Mississippi College:		26–66	14–53			
Total:		101–92				
National championship Conference title Conference division title or championship game berth
