= Todd Cooley =

American football player and coach (born 1975)

Current position
- Title: Special assistant to the head coach & director of high school relations
- Team: Ole Miss
- Conference: SEC

Biographical details
- Born: September 7, 1975 (age 51)
- Education: Arkansas Tech University

Playing career
- 1994–1997: Arkansas Tech
- Position: Quarterback

Coaching career (HC unless noted)
- 1998–1999: Arkansas Tech (RB)
- 2000: Northeastern State (QB/WR)
- 2001–2003: Ouachita Baptist (QB)
- 2004: Arkansas Tech (OC/QB)
- 2005–2008: Central Arkansas (OC/QB)
- 2009–2012: Northwestern State (OC/QB)
- 2013–2025: Delta State
- 2026–present: Ole Miss (spec. asst. to the HC/Dir. of HS Relations)

Head coaching record
- Overall: 82–49
- Tournaments: 2–4 (NCAA D-II playoffs)

Accomplishments and honors

Championships
- 3 GSC (2014, 2022–2023)

Awards
- 3x GSC Coach of the Year (2013, 2014, 2022)

Todd Cooley (born September 7, 1975) is an American college football coach. He currently serves as the director of high school relations and as a special assistant to the head coach at Ole Miss. He was the head football coach for Delta State University from 2013 through 2025. Cooley grew up in Nashville, Arkansas and graduated from Arkansas Tech University with a degree in English. At ATU, Cooley started at quarterback from 1996 to 1997 and was a nominee for the Harlon Hill Award. He began his coaching career in 1998 at Arkansas Tech and has also served as an offensive assistant coach at Northeastern State where he received his master's degree, Ouachita Baptist, Central Arkansas and Northwestern State. Cooley was announced as the head coach at Delta State on January 25, 2013, after the resignation of Jamey Chadwell. As an assistant Cooley has been part of four conference championship teams and as a head coach, he has won one co-championship. Cooley was named Gulf South Conference Coach of the Year in 2013 and Co-Coach of the Year in 2014.

Delta State created a new contract to the head coach after a successful 2017 season, which saw the team back in the playoffs competing, and off the field managing the team success at school. The new contract extends through the 2021 season.

== Head coaching record ==
Year	Team	Overall	Conference	Standing	Bowl/playoffs	AFCA^{#}	D2^{°}
Delta State Statesmen (Gulf South Conference) (2013–present)
2013	Delta State	7–3	4–2	3rd			
2014	Delta State	9–2	6–1	T–1st	L NCAA Division II Second Round	13	
2015	Delta State	6–5	2–5	6th			
2016	Delta State	4–6	3–5	T–6th			
2017	Delta State	9–4	5–3	T–2nd	L NCAA Division II Second Round	21	
2018	Delta State	2–8	2–6	7th			
2019	Delta State	6–4	5–3	3rd			
2020–21	No team—COVID-19						
2021	Delta State	5–6	3–4	5th			
2022	Delta State	11–2	6–1	T–1st	L NCAA Division II Second Round	9	
2023	Delta State	10–2	7–1	T–1st	L NCAA Division II Second Round	11	13
2024	Delta State	6–4	3–3	5th			
2025	Delta State	7–3	1–2	3rd			
Delta State:		82–49	47–36				
Total:		82–49					
National championship Conference title Conference division title or championship game berth
