= B. T. Harvey Stadium =

Sports venue in Atlanta, Georgia, United States

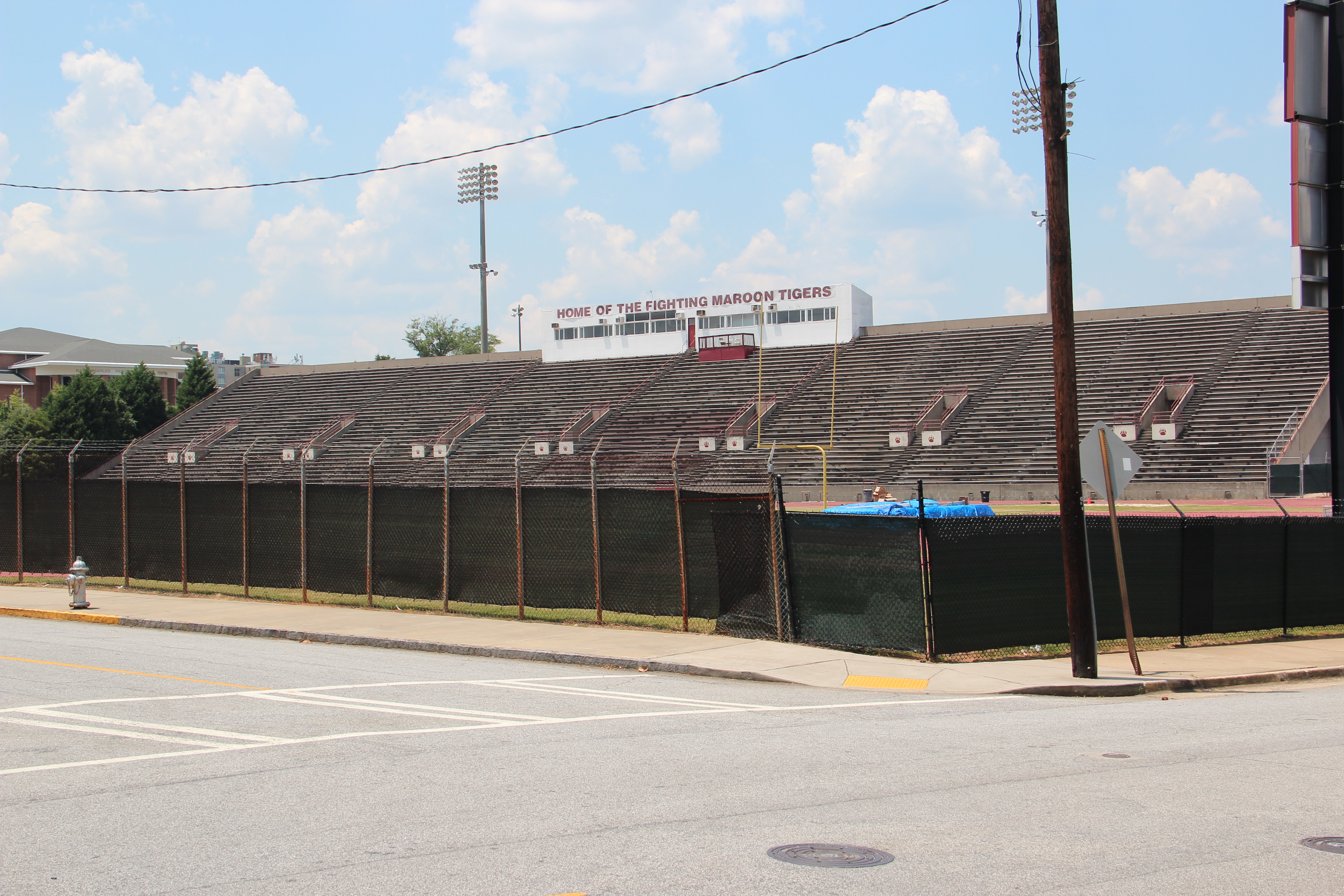
- Interactive map of B. T. Harvey Stadium
- Location: Atlanta, Georgia
- Coordinates: 33°44′44″N 84°24′58″W
- Capacity: 9,000

Tenant
- Morehouse College

B.T. Harvey Stadium is a stadium in Atlanta, Georgia. It is primarily used for American football, and is the home field of the Morehouse College.
