= Delta State–Mississippi College football rivalry =

American college football rivalry

Delta State–Mississippi College Rivalry Heritage Bell Classic
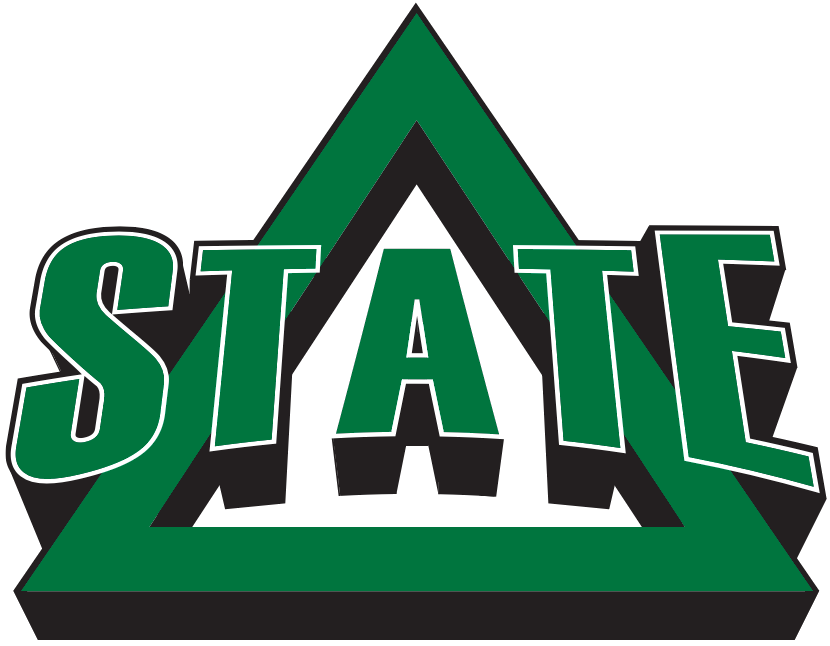
- Delta State Statesmen Mississippi College Choctaws
- Sport: Football
- First meeting: October 26, 1935; Mississippi College, 33–0
- Latest meeting: November 16, 2024; Delta State, 20–14
- Trophy: Heritage Bell

Statistics
- Total meetings: 44
- All-time series: Delta State leads, 26–16–2
- Largest victory: Delta State, 41–0 (1955)
- Longest win streak: Delta State, 7 (1994–2018)
- Current win streak: Delta State, 4 (2021–present)

Locations in Mississippi

The Delta State–Mississippi College football rivalry, commonly known as the Heritage Bell Classic, was a college football rivalry game between a public university and a private Christian college in the U.S. state of Mississippi, the Delta State University Statesmen and the Mississippi College Choctaws. The current winner is Delta State, who won 20–14 on November 16, 2024. Delta State leads the all-time series, 26–16–2.

== History ==
=== Background: 1935–1994 ===
The Delta State Statesmen were co-founding members of the Gulf South Conference in 1970. Mississippi College joined the conference in 1972 and played 23 straight games with the Statesmen before the Choctaws left the conference in 1996 which halted the series. The Choctaws left the conference and NCAA Division II to compete at the NCAA Division III level until 2014, when they rejoined the conference and continued the series with Delta State.

The annual battle between Delta State and Mississippi College was one of the most anticipated contests in the Magnolia State from 1973 to 1995.

== Game results ==
Delta State victories	Mississippi College victories	Tie games

No.	Date	Location	Winner	Score
1	October 26, 1935	Clinton	Mississippi College	33–0
2	October 31, 1936	Clinton	Mississippi College	20–0
3	October 18, 1941	Clinton	Mississippi College	17–6
4	1947	Clinton	Mississippi College	19–0
5	October 9, 1948	Cleveland	Delta State	7–6
6	October 30, 1954	Clinton	Delta State	25–0
7	October 29, 1955	Cleveland	Delta State	41–0
8	September 22, 1956	Clinton	Delta State	25–0
9	September 21, 1957	Cleveland	Delta State	19–7
10	October 18, 1969	Jackson	Delta State	33–7
11	October 17, 1970	Jackson	Tie	30–30
12	September 29, 1973	Cleveland	Delta State	17–16
13	September 21, 1974	Clinton	Delta State	13–3
14	October 11, 1975	Cleveland	Delta State	24–0
15	October 9, 1976	Clinton	Delta State	7–3
16	October 8, 1977	Cleveland	Delta State	24–13
17	October 7, 1978	Clinton	Mississippi College	27–0
18	October 6, 1979	Cleveland	Mississippi College	27–19
19	October 11, 1980	Clinton	Mississippi College	10–7
20	November 7, 1981	Cleveland	Mississippi College	38–21
21	November 6, 1982	Clinton	Mississippi College	27–6
22	November 19, 1983	Cleveland	Delta State	31–21
23	November 17, 1984	Clinton	Delta State	30–21

No.	Date	Location	Winner	Score
24	November 23, 1985	Cleveland	Tie	14–14
25	November 22, 1986	Clinton	Delta State	21–10
26	November 21, 1987	Cleveland	Mississippi College	13–7
27	November 12, 1988	Clinton	Mississippi College	7–3
28	November 11, 1989	Cleveland	Delta State	17–7
29	November 10, 1990	Clinton	Mississippi College	35–17
30	November 16, 1991	Cleveland	Mississippi College	27–10
31	November 14, 1992	Clinton	Mississippi College	34–23
32	November 13, 1993	Cleveland	Mississippi College	13–7
33	November 12, 1994	Clinton	Delta State	14–0
34	November 11, 1995	Cleveland	Delta State	14–0
35	November 15, 2014	Cleveland	Delta State	27–3
36	November 14, 2015	Clinton	Delta State	37–29
37	September 29, 2016	Cleveland	Delta State	61–31
38	September 30, 2017	Clinton	Delta State	30–17
39	November 10, 2018	Cleveland	Delta State	28–21
40	November 16, 2019	Clinton	Mississippi College	37–13
41	November 6, 2021	Cleveland	Delta State	24–21
42	October 29, 2022	Clinton	Delta State	52–38
43	November 11, 2023	Cleveland	Delta State	41–3
44	November 16, 2024	Clinton	Delta State	20–14
Series: Delta State leads 26–16–2

== See also ==
- List of NCAA college football rivalry games
