= Barron Stadium =

Stadium in Rome, Georgia, US

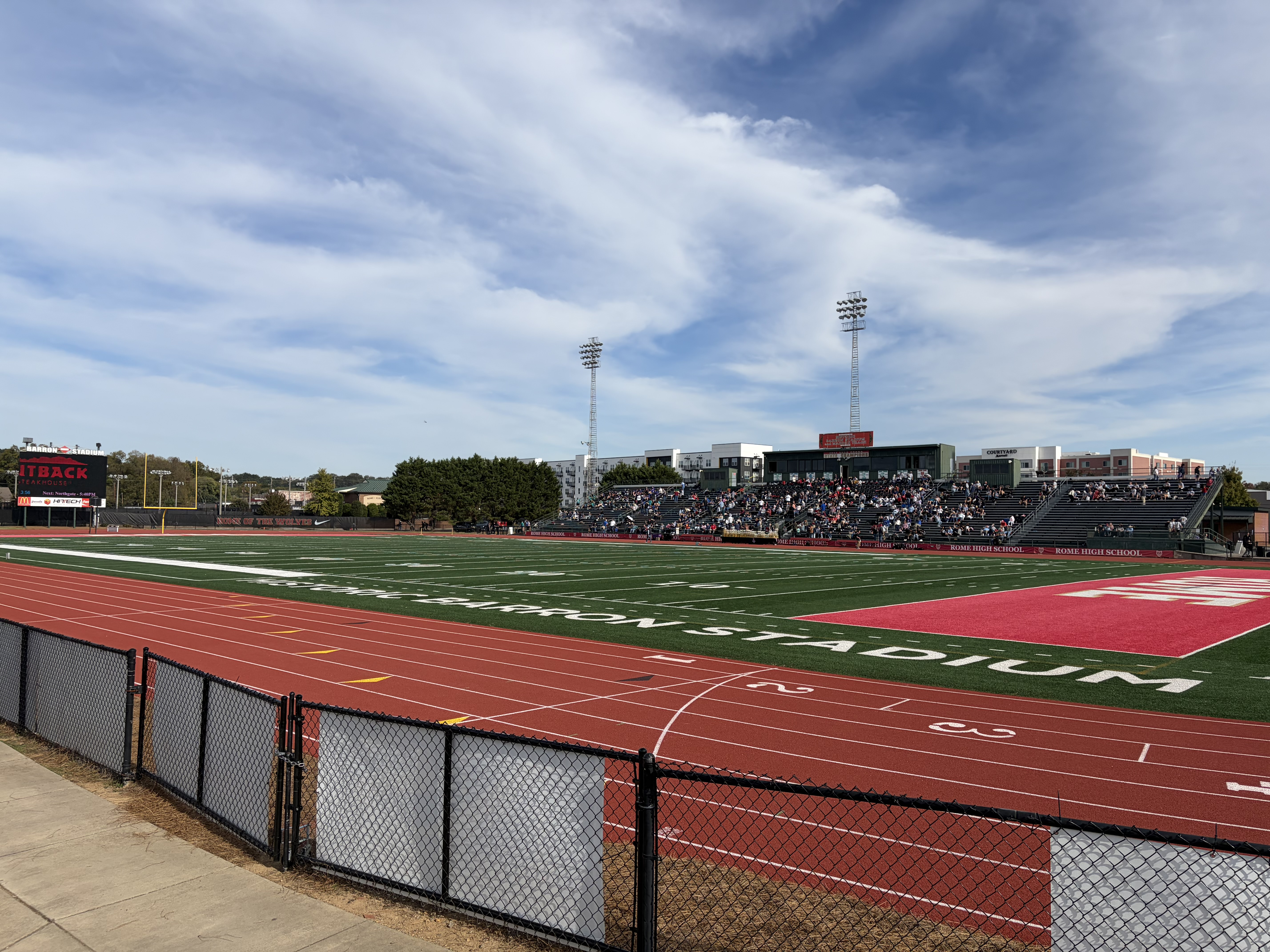
- Barron Stadium in 2025
- Interactive map of Barron Stadium
- Location: 301 West 3rd Street, Rome, Georgia, 30165
- Coordinates: 34.257013°N 85.17698232°W
- Owner: Rome-Floyd Parks and Recreation Authority
- Operator: Rome City School District
- Capacity: 6,500
- Surface: AstroTurf

Construction
- Groundbreaking: 1924

Tenants
- Shorter University (NCAA); Rome High School (GHSA)

Barron Stadium is a 6,500-seat football field and track & field stadium in Rome, Georgia. It is home to the Shorter University Hawks and Rome High School Wolves football teams. The facility hosted the NAIA Football National Championship from 2008–13 and the NCCAA Victory Bowl in 2013-14, as well as the NCCAA track championships from 2014-16.

Barron Stadium is owned by the Rome-Floyd Parks and Recreation Authority (RFPRA), a city-county partnership, and has been operated by the Rome City School District since 2015. For usage, it cost Shorter University $7,500 in 2012 to host its home football games as part of a three-year, $321,000 contract that included football, track & field, other sports, events, and the school's commencement exercises. Rome High School paid $5,000 per game for its home football games at that time. The RFPRA provides staffing for athletic events and pays for facility maintenance.

== History ==
The athletic field is over 100 years old, originally known as Hamilton Field. Dating to 1924, the stadium was renamed Barron Stadium in 1925 for local businessman William F. Barron, who helped acquire the property. (Barron's father founded the Rome Coca-Cola bottling plant in 1901.) Lights were installed by 1937, and the school district turned over operation of the facility to the city recreation department in 1957. Renovations occurred in 1967 and 2008, and a new press box was built in 2001. In 2010, Barron received $3.4 million in upgrades, paid for by a local option sales tax, that included a new artificial turf field, an NCAA-certified track, and a new scoreboard, plus expanded locker room, press and seating facilities.

In its early days, the field hosted local prep teams like the Rome Hilltoppers and Darlington Lakesiders. Barron hosted football state championship wins for local East Rome High School in 1977 and 1978, and for West Rome High School in 1983 and 1985. The last crosstown rivalry football game between the schools was played at Barron in 1991 before they were consolidated into one high school. State football championship games were also held at Barron Stadium in 1953, 1954, 1969, 1971, 1972, and 1974. The stadium began hosting Shorter College football in 2005, the program's inaugural season. Barron also hosted football games for Berry College in 2013-14 before the team began playing at its new on-campus stadium in 2015.

A proposed relocation of the facility in 2005 was scuttled after talks between local developers and the city broke down. Developers wanted to turn the 14-acre Barron Stadium area into a multi-use development with homes, offices, and retail. The athletic facilities would have been relocated to a new location adjacent to Rome's minor-league baseball park, State Mutual Stadium, with the new complex consisting of a new football stadium, track, gymnastics center, aquatic center, and other buildings. Although an initial agreement was entered into by the developers and the city, cost estimates and a short timeline for development eventually derailed the project. Other problems during the project discussions included the timeline for debt retirement of bonds that would have been issued from a newly created tax-allocation district and reimbursements to Floyd County under the proposed city/county agreement.

The stadium was used as a filming location for the 2021 film, Black Widow.

== Other sports ==
The track at Barron Stadium is named the John Maddox Track after a local track standout and 1932 Summer Olympics hopeful who successfully lobbied the city for a better municipal track facility and helped found the Rome News Relays, a major local track & field event. In 1971, the track at Barron was named after Maddox following his sudden death the previous year. Maddox was the grandson of local judge and U.S. Rep. John W. Maddox.

There are also tennis courts located at the stadium complex.

== GHSA championship football games at Barron Stadium ==
- Dec. 10, 1953 (Class B) Model 25, Ocilla 19
- Dec. 10, 1954 (Class A) Jesup 26, Rockmart 6
- Dec. 6, 1969 (Class C) Savannah Country Day 16, Adairsville 0
- Nov. 19, 1971 (Class C) Mount de Sales 28, Adairsville 14
- Dec. 8, 1972 (Class B) Southeast Bulloch 12, Adairsville 9
- Dec. 14, 1974 (Class AA) Americus 6, West Rome 3
- Dec. 10, 1977 (Class A) East Rome 35, Early County 7
- Dec. 10, 1983 (Class AA) West Rome 35, Dooly County 0
- Dec. 14, 1985 (Class AA) West Rome 28, Washington-Wilkes 10
- Dec. 20, 1986 (Class A) Lincoln County 7, East Rome 6

== Gallery ==
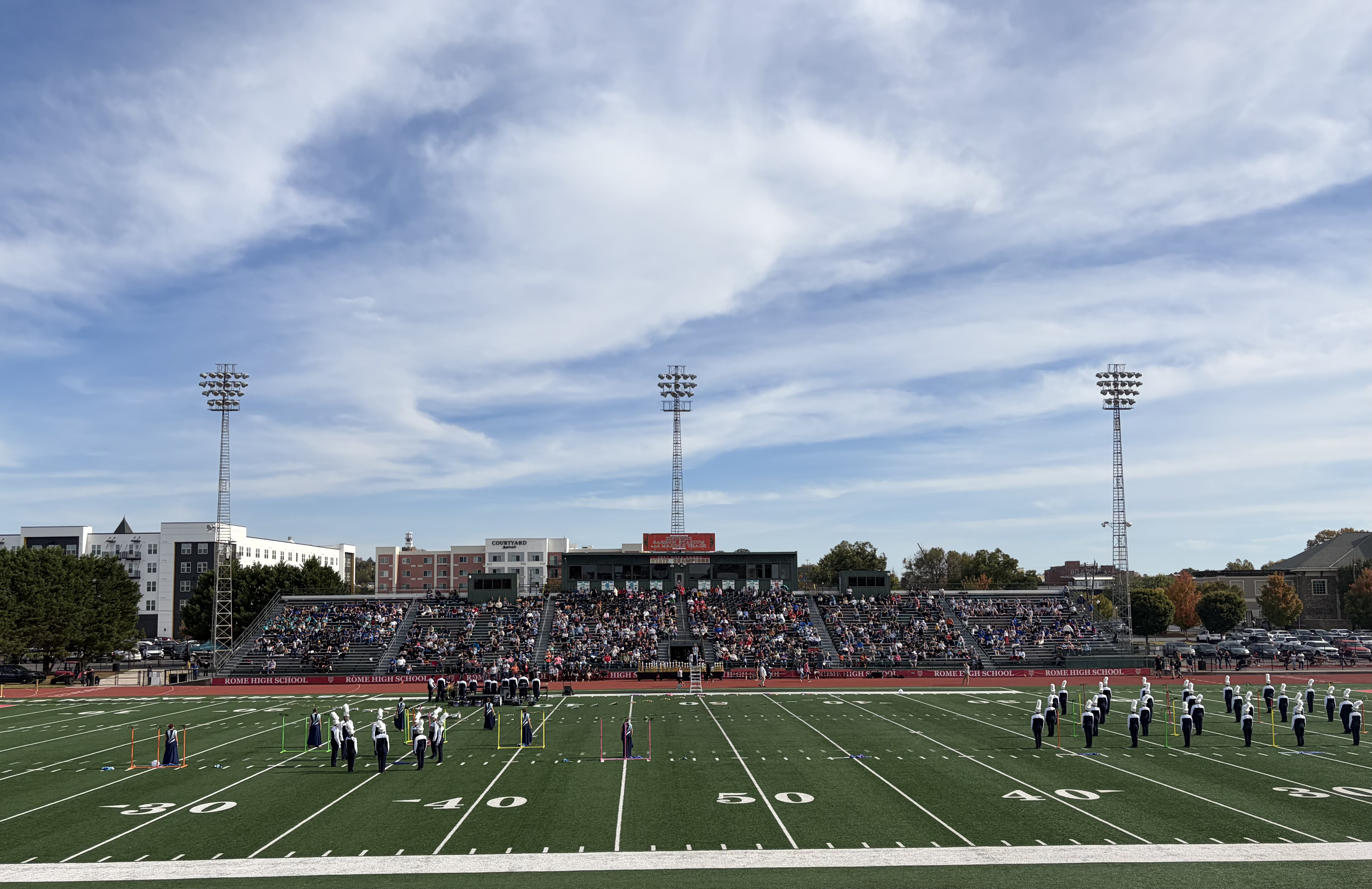
Home stands

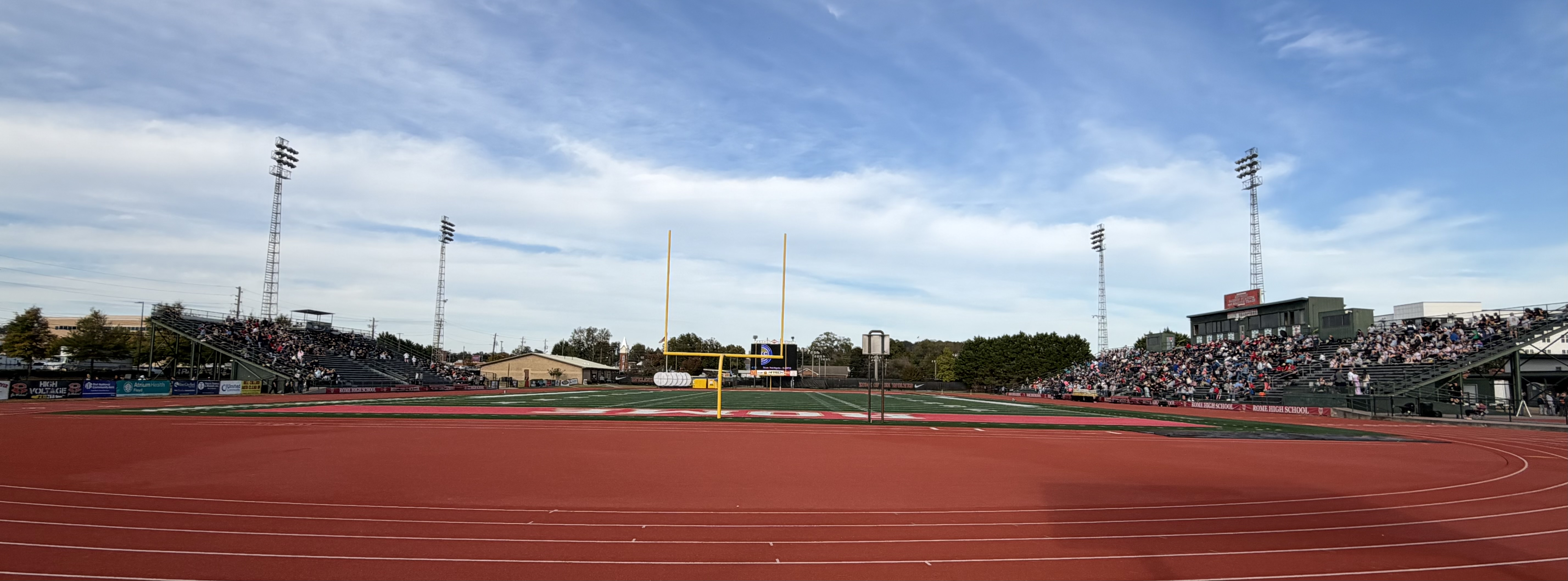
Stadium view from the end zone

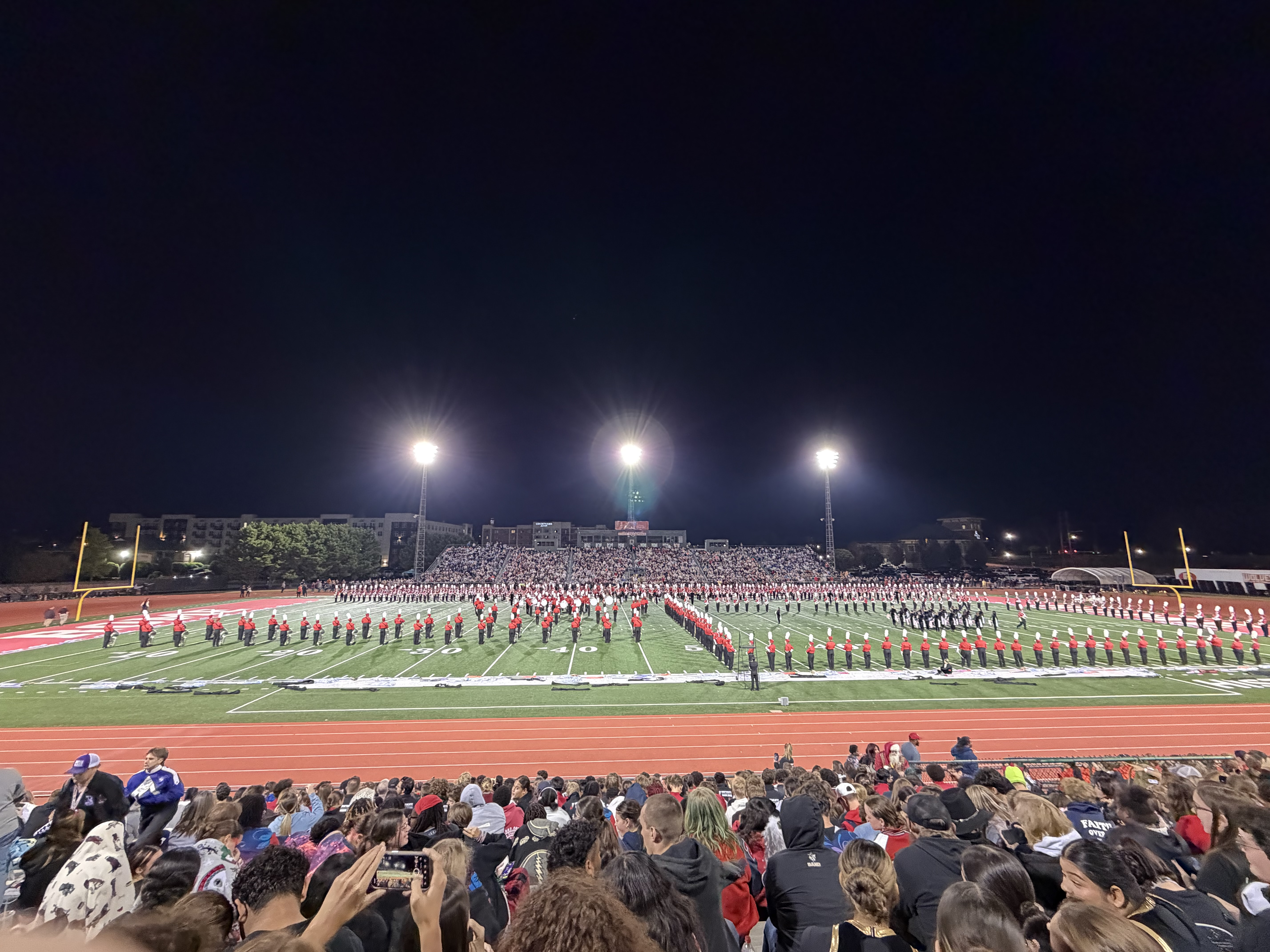
The stadium at night

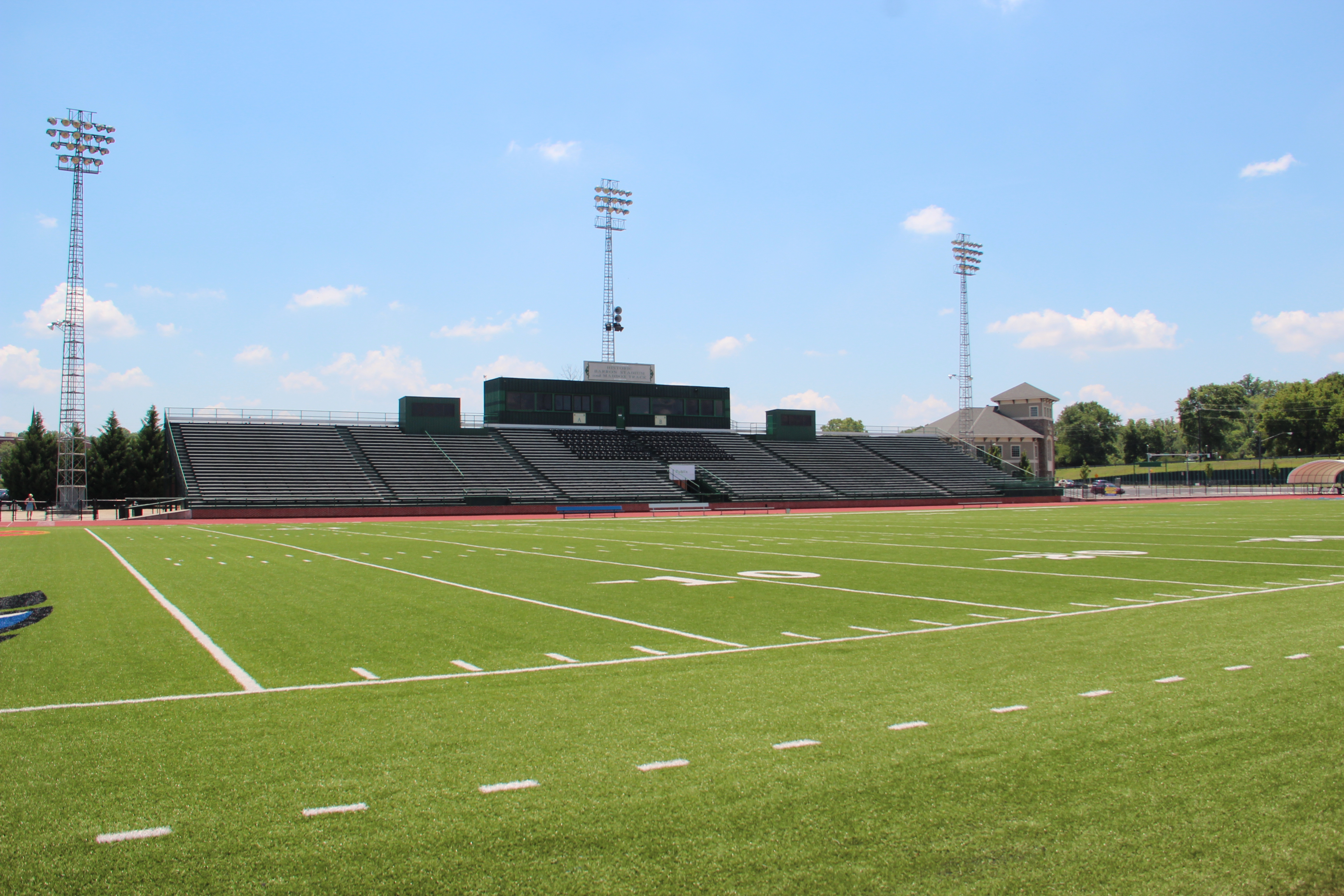
Barron Stadium in 2015

Events and tenants
Preceded by Jim Carroll Stadium	Host of the NAIA Football National Championship; 2008-2013	Succeeded by Municipal Stadium (Daytona Beach)
Preceded by Francis Field	Host of the NCCAA Victory Bowl; 2013-2014	Succeeded by Lumpkins Stadium
