= Bazemore–Hyder Stadium =

Sports stadium in Valdoata, Georgia, United States

Bazemore-Hyder Stadium
- Death Valley
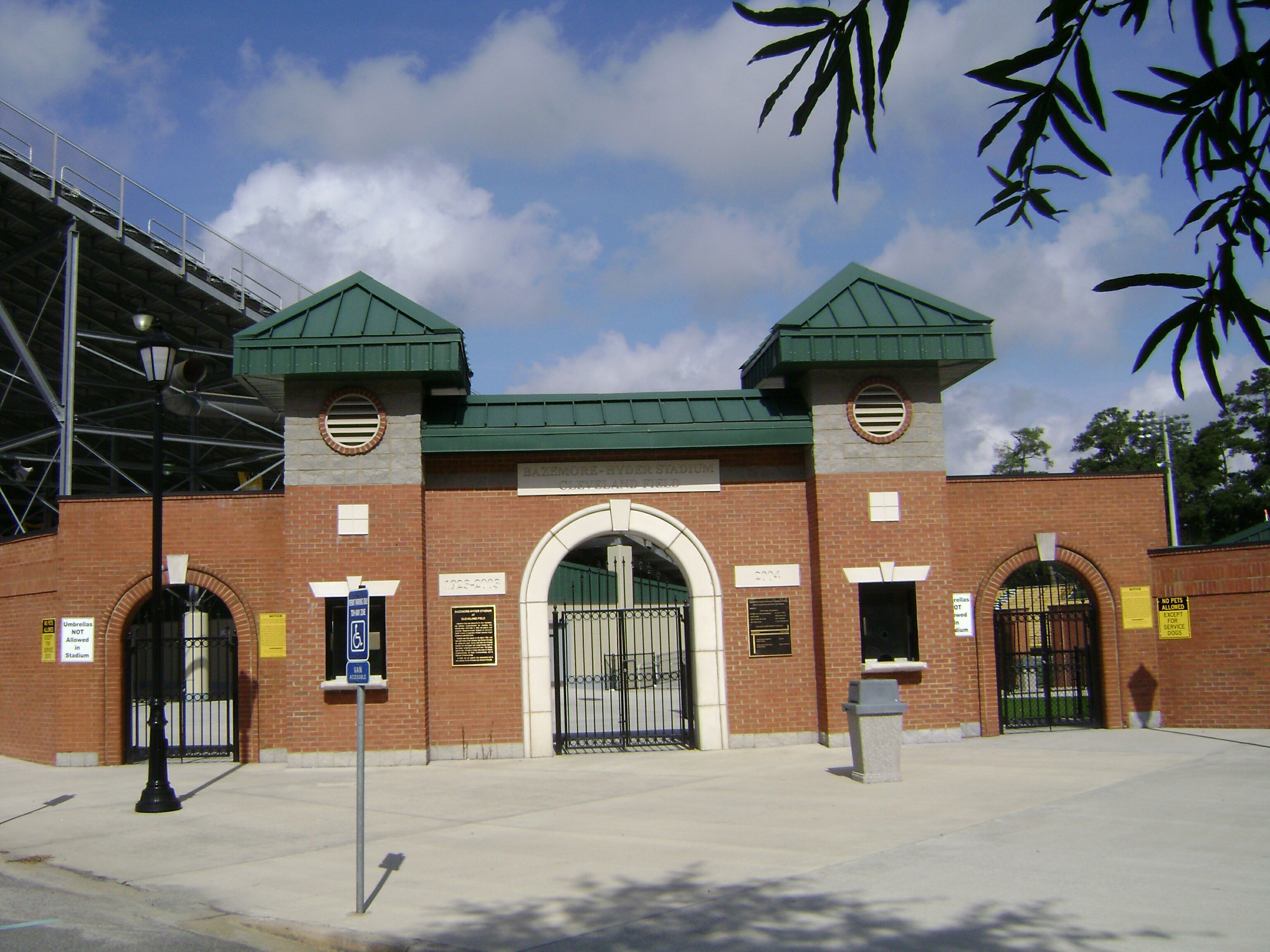
- Interactive map of Bazemore-Hyder Stadium
- Full name: Bazemore-Hyder Stadium
- Former names: Cleveland Field
- Location: Valdosta, Georgia
- Coordinates: 30.845896°N 83.284146°W
- Capacity: 11,249

Construction
- Built: 1922
- Opened: 1924
- Renovated: 2004

Tenants
- Valdosta State (NCAA); Valdosta High School (GHSA)

Bazemore–Hyder Stadium at Cleveland Field is a stadium in Valdosta, Georgia. It is primarily used for American football, and is the home field of Valdosta High School. Valdosta State University, winner of the NCAA Division II National Football Championship in 2004, 2007, 2012, and 2018 also uses Bazemore–Hyder Stadium as a home field. The stadium holds 11,249 people and was opened in 1922. The original name of the stadium was Cleveland Field. The stadium's nickname is "Death Valley." It is the home of Valdosta Wildcats football and soccer and Valdosta State Blazers football. There was also some new turf that was installed in time for the 2024 Valdosta high and Valdosta state 2024 seasons

== History ==
The construction of the new Valdosta High School in 1922 soon brought the use of the field next to the school grounds. Play began at the field about 1924. Originally the field contained very little grass and no seating. As time passed a set of wooden bleachers was constructed on the north side of the field and eventually seating constructed on the south side.

One side of the wooden bleachers collapsed before a game in 1941. Valdosta High School received its first set of metal stands in 1949 on the south side of the field. Metal seating existed on the north side of the field by 1953.

== Cleveland Field ==
Cleveland Field is named after the late Dr. A.G. Cleveland who was Superintendent of the Valdosta City School System from 1919 until 1949. Although constructed in 1922, the field was not officially named until 1923.

He believed firmly in physical exercise and regularly cut the grass on the grounds of the old Valdosta High building before the days of power mowers. He also regularly rode a bicycle wherever he went. He was a strong supporter of all athletic teams during his 30 years as Superintendent.

== Bazemore-Hyder Stadium ==
In a resolution presented by the Valdosta Touchdown Club, the Board of Education officially named the stadium at Cleveland Field, Bazemore–Hyder Stadium on September 9, 1996. Coaches Wright Bazemore (1941–1942,1946–1971) and Nick Hyder (1974–1995) combined for fifty years of service to our youth and community. Under their leadership, the Wildcats won six national titles, 21 of their 24 state titles and 282 Cleveland Field victories.

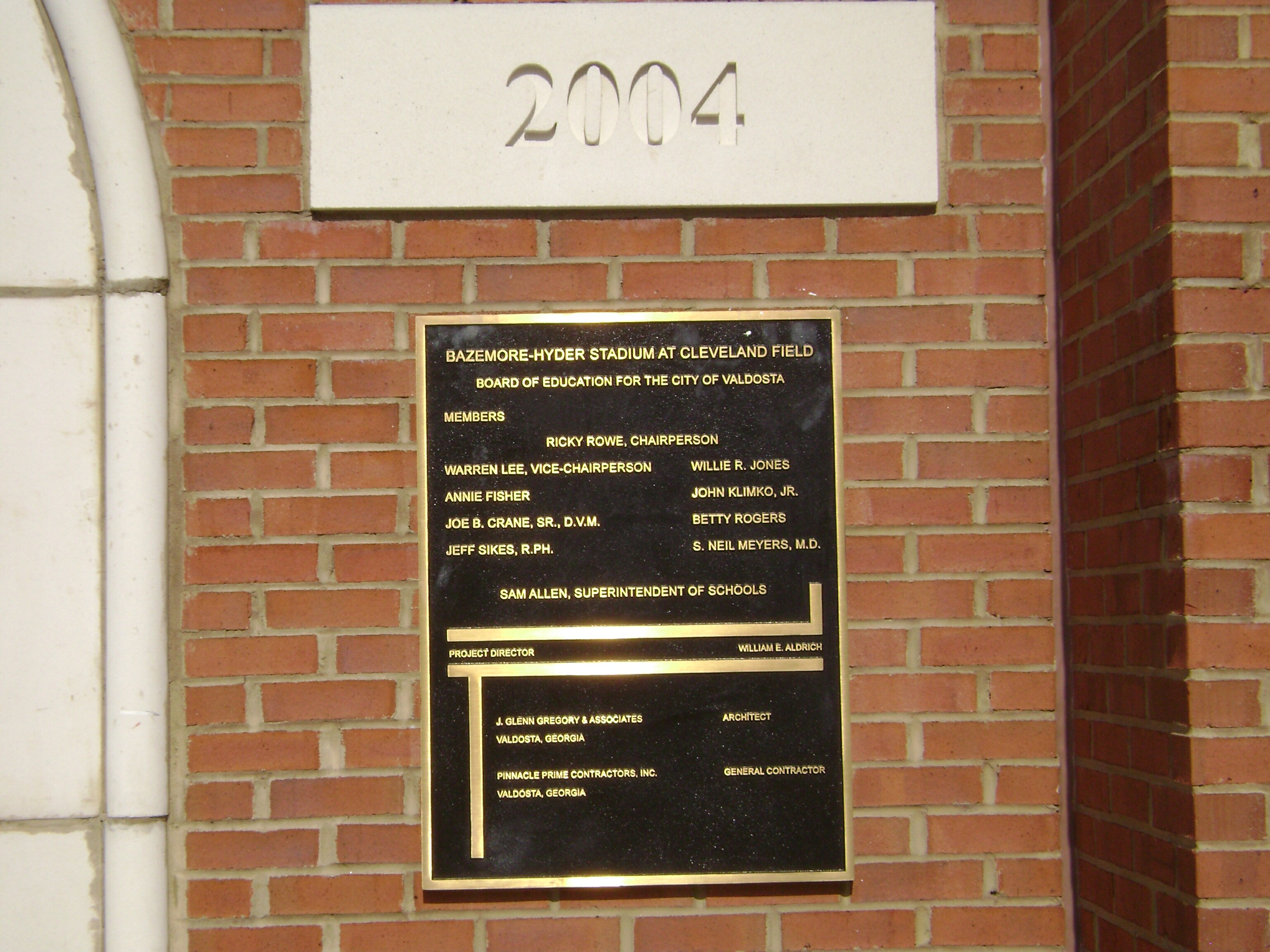
2004 Plaque on Bazemore-Hyder Stadium

== 2004 Renovations ==
In 2004 Bazemore–Hyder Stadium was the site of major renovations. The project cost $6.5 million and was paid for through SPLOST funds. Work began two days after the conclusion of the 2003 Georgia AAAAA State Championship held in Valdosta. The project was completed in eight months so as to be ready before the 2004 season.

Renovations included completely rebuilding the home stands, new entrances, adding a new two-story enclosed and air-conditioned press box, with an elevator, and new restrooms and concessions. The middle three sections of the home stands feature plastic chair seating colored yellow and groups of black seats are arranged to form two paw prints and a 'V' in the center on the stands. The remainder of the home side features bench seating with backs; the only seats without backing on the home side are the rows reserved for the VHS band. The visitors side also received new bleachers, handrails, new paint, and the addition of a small press box.

Before these renovations, seating capacity was 10,349 fans. When the renovations were completed before the start of the 2004 fall season, the capacity increased to 11,249 which includes 7,749 reserved seats. As part of the renovations, the natural grass field was replaced with a synthetic Sprinturf field.

A Valdosta Wildcat Museum, featuring memorabilia and trophies from the programs storied past was built. The facility is operated by the Touchdown Club and open during home games. Next to the museum is the memorial courtyard containing personalized bricks including names of past Wildcat players, and monuments to Valdosta High coaches Wright Bazemore, Nick Hyder and former superintendent A.G. Cleveland. In 2010, the Valdosta City Schools System Board of Education renamed the Wildcat museum the David S. Waller, Sr. Valdosta Wildcat Museum. Waller had been involved with the school system for over 68 years.
