= McCool Stadium =

Football stadium in Cleveland, Mississippi

Travis E. Parker Field at Horace L. McCool Stadium
- Interactive map of Travis E. Parker Field at Horace L. McCool Stadium
- Location: Cleveland, Mississippi
- Coordinates: 33.75215°N 90.73818°W
- Owner: Delta State University
- Operator: Delta State University
- Capacity: 8,000
- Surface: Artificial turf

Construction
- Opened: 1970

Tenant
- Delta State Statesmen and Lady Statesmen (NCAA D2)

McCool Stadium, officially known as Travis E. Parker Field at Horace L. McCool Stadium, is the home playing venue for the Delta State Statesmen football team. Located in Cleveland, Mississippi, the stadium has a capacity of 8,000. Originally constructed in 1970, the stadium is one of the Gulf South Conference’s most historic venues.

== History ==
The stadium was built in 1970, as a replacement for the "old" Delta Field, and was called Delta Field and Travis E. Parker Field. The first game it hosted was a Delta State win over Southeast Missouri State, 14-8. In 2007, the university recognized Horace L. McCool, one of the greatest collegiate head coaches in Mississippi football history. McCool served as the head coach of the Statesmen from 1961-1973, which helped open the new stadium at the time in 1970. Over the span of those 13 seasons, McCool recorded 76 wins, 48 losses and three ties, including six-straight winning seasons. Horace McCool still stands as the all-time record for a head coach at Delta State, and he continues on being the only coach in Statesman history to have six-consecutive winning seasons as a head coach.

=== Renovations ===
The first of many renovations to McCool Stadium was in 1993. The university replaced certain seating sections the stadium with green chairback seats to give the spectators more comfort. A new scoreboard as well as a video board were added in 2008. The press box was renovated in May 2013 and includes booths for radio, film, coaches, and working press, as well as a snack-kitchen and restroom. Adding artificial turf in 2014 to the football field is one of the most recent additions to the stadium.

== Attendance records ==
McCool Stadium attendance records
Rank	Attendance	Date	Game Result
1	9,023	09-18-2004	Delta State 28, North Alabama 21
2	8,943	09-22-2012	North Alabama 20, Delta State 12
3	8,765	09-27-2014	Delta State 72, Central State 8
4	8,551	09-19-2015	Delta State 51, Kentucky Wesleyan 18
5	8,522	11-05-2011	Delta State 36, West Alabama 34
6	8,012	09-28-2013	Delta State 52, Florida Tech 31
7	7,856	10-07-2017	West Alabama 29, Delta State 26
8	7,755	10-01-2011	Delta State 45, Ouachita Baptist 14
9	7,635	09-08-2001	Delta State 25, Mississippi Valley State 3
10	7,333	09-25-2010	Delta State 41, Henderson State 37
