= Shorter Hawks =

Intercollegiate sports athletic teams that represent Shorter University

- University: Shorter University
- Conference: Conference Carolinas
- NCAA: Division II
- Athletic director: Richard Hendricks
- Location: Rome, Georgia
- Varsity teams: 20 (10 men's, 10 women's)
- Football stadium: Barron Stadium
- Basketball arena: Winthrop-King Centre
- Baseball stadium: Robert H. Ledbetter Baseball Complex
- Softball stadium: Alto Park Softball Complex
- Soccer field: Ben Brady Field
- Lacrosse stadium: Ben Brady Field
- Mascot: Harold the Hawk
- Nickname: Hawks
- Fight song: SU Fight Song
- Colors: Royal blue and white
- Website: goshorterhawks.com
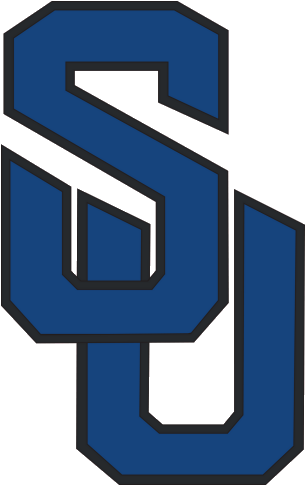

The Shorter Hawks are the athletic teams that represent Shorter University, located in Rome, Georgia, in intercollegiate sports at the Division II level of the National Collegiate Athletic Association (NCAA). The Hawks have primarily competed in the Conference Carolinas since the 2023–24 academic year.

Shorter was previously a member of the Gulf South Conference, competing from 2012 to 2024.

Shorter competes in 22 intercollegiate varsity sports. Men's sports include baseball, basketball, cheerleading, cross country, football, golf, lacrosse, soccer, tennis, and track and field (indoor and outdoor); while women's sports include basketball, cheerleading, cross country, golf, lacrosse, soccer, softball, tennis, track and field (indoor and outdoor), and volleyball.

== Move to NCAA Division II ==
The Shorter Hawks were granted provisional membership in the NCAA in the summer of 2013, after successfully completing their second year in the Division II membership process. Formerly a powerhouse program at the NAIA level, Shorter has been a full NCAA member since the 2014–2015 academic year, in which the Hawks continued following all NCAA Division II rules and regulations, and the university had been allowed to use the NCAA brand for its promotional and recruiting purposes, including logos, memorabilia, and merchandise.

== Conference affiliations ==
NAIA

- Southern States Athletic Conference (1999–2012)

NCAA

- Gulf South Conference (2012–2024)
- Conference Carolinas (2024–present)

== Varsity teams ==
| Men's sports | Women's sports |
|---|---|
| Baseball | Basketball |
| Basketball | Cheerleading |
| Cheerleading | Cross country |
| Cross country | Golf |
| Football | Lacrosse |
| Golf | Soccer |
| Lacrosse | Softball |
| Soccer | Tennis |
| Tennis | Track and field^{†} |
| Track and field^{†} | Volleyball |
† – Track and field includes both indoor and outdoor

=== Football ===
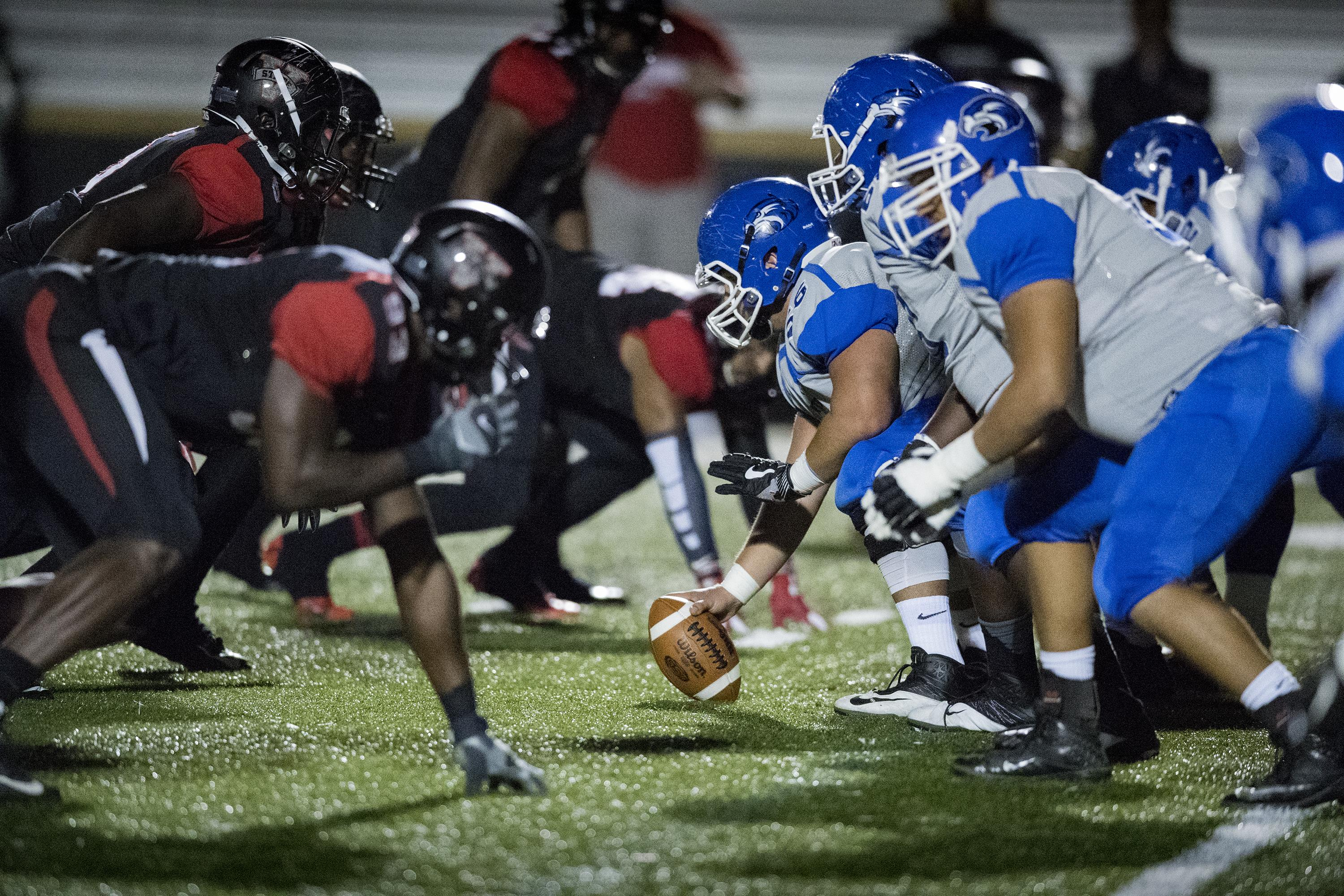
A football game between Shorter and Valdosta State in 2016

The Hawks capped their first season at the Division II level with a winning 6–5 record, in one of the nation's toughest conferences – the Gulf South, which produced the 2012 national champion in Valdosta State and marks the 11th time a conference team has won it all. Significant at the end of the season were back-to-back wins over GSC foes West Georgia and former national titleholder Delta State.

==== Program achievements ====
| Gulf South Conference Champions | |
| Victory Bowl Participants | 2014 |
| NAIA Team Playoff Participants | 2008 |
| NCAA Division II Team Playoff Participants | |
| NCAA Division II Regional Championships | |
| NCAA Division II National Championships | |

=== Volleyball ===
Shorter's volleyball team turned some heads within the conference as well as the Lady Hawks finished second in the final standings that would have qualified them for the GSC tournament, but still extended their season being a part of the National Christian College Athletic Association (NCCAA) postseason where Shorter won a South Region crown and came within one win of collecting a national championship. Three Lady Hawks emerged with NCCAA All-American honors: Jordan Corder, Jasmine Crook and Leslie Welch.

=== Basketball ===
On the basketball court, Shorter's Lady Hawks posted a fourth-place finish with a winning record, then made the most of the NCCAA door open to them as they opened the postseason winning the South Region championship and took fifth place at the NCCAA national tournament where standout Karisma Boykin was recognized as an NCCAA All-American. The Hawks, who finished fourth in the GSC and up until the final weeks were first-place contenders, first collected the NCCAA South Region crown and the national title in a thriller that saw them come-from-behind and win the championship in an overtime thriller. Just how good the team was became evident when head coach Chad Warner was named Georgia Basketball Coaches Association Division II Coach of the Year, Anthony Banks earned NCCAA All-American recognition, Banks and Walter Hill were GBCA All-State picks and Dedric Ware was named the GBCA Newcomer of the Year.

=== Track and field ===
On the indoor track oval, the Lady Hawks emerged as the best NCCAA team in the nation when they secured their first national championship with three athletes leading the way. Sophomore Ayana Walker was part of four national championship performances, junior Lakeisha Spikes had a hand in three and junior Shea Spicher posted a clutch national championship effort in the 3,000 meters. Picking up where they left off on the indoor track, the Lady Hawks kept up the pace on the outdoor circuit and were joined by the men in reaping honors, all of it coming in a year when more than a dozen standouts were red-shirted during Shorter's transition phase. On the national scene, Shorter's women made a run at another title before settling for runner-up honors while the Hawks turned in a solid eighth-place finish at the NCCAA] national meet where both teams saw more than a dozen athletes claim All-American status. That came on the heels of the Lady Hawks’ and Hawks’ respective third- and fourth-place outings at the Peach Belt Conference Championship that Shorter hosted at Barron Stadium. Spikes was named the PBC's co-Female Athlete of the Year and Micah Reed was selected as the conference's Male Freshman of the Year.

Shorter won the NAIA Men's Outdoor Track and Field Championship in 2011 and 2012. With members of that same strong team, they also won the NAIA Men's Indoor Track and Field Championship in 2012 in between.

Nigel Talton ran track at Shorter before he began starring as "The Freeze" at Atlanta Braves home games in 2017; between innings, Talton would outrun fans on the warning track who were given substantial headstarts.

=== Softball ===
Having captured the NAIA national title in 2012, Shorter's softball team understood that the pressure was on for them to turn in the same kind of success, and the Lady Hawks responded by putting together a 46–11 record and emerging with the best record in the GSC that boasted defending Division II national champion Valdosta State. In the NCCAA postseason, the Lady Hawks didn't disappoint there as well as they rolled to the South Region crown and claimed national runner-up honors, plus became the program that produced the most NCCAA All-Americans in Felicia Morris, Christina Ezell, Maddie Bray and Jackie Castanada.

== National championships ==
=== Team ===
| Sport | Association | Division | Year | Opponent/Runner-up | Score |
|---|---|---|---|---|---|
| Softball (1) | NAIA | Single | 2012 | Oklahoma City | 1–0 |
| Men's indoor track and field (1) | NAIA | Single | 2011 | Wayland Baptist | 44–41 |
| Men's outdoor track and field (2) | NAIA | Single | 2011 | Doane | 66–59 (+7) |
| Men's outdoor track and field (2) | NAIA | Single | 2012 | Azusa Pacific | 93–69 (+24) |

== Notable alumni ==
- Zach Morrison (football)
- Lennie Acuff (men's basketball)
- Kyle Segebart (men's soccer)
