= Justin Carrigan =

American football coach (born c. 1980)

Current position
- Title: Athletic director
- Team: Liberty Hill HS (TX)

Biographical details
- Born: c. 1980 (age 45–46); Carrollton, Texas, U.S.
- Education: Angelo State University (2003); Midwestern State University (2007)

Playing career
- 1999–2002: Angelo State
- Position: Safety

Coaching career (HC unless noted)
- 2005: Midwestern State (GA)
- 2006–2009: Midwestern State (WR)
- 2010: UTEP (OA)
- 2011: Tarleton State (WR)
- 2012–2014: Tarleton State (OC/QB)
- 2015–2022: UT Permian Basin

Administrative career (AD unless noted)
- 2023: UT Permian Basin (deputy AD)
- 2023–present: Liberty Hill HS (TX)

Head coaching record
- Overall: 25–36
- Bowls: 0–1

Accomplishments and honors

Awards
- As player: 2× All-LSC (2000, 2001)

Justin Carrigan (born c. 1980) is an American athletic director and former college football coach. He is the athletic director for Liberty Hill High School, a position he has held since 2023. He was the deputy athletic director for the University of Texas Permian Basin in 2023 and the school's head football coach from its inception in 2015 until 2022. He also coached for Midwestern State, UTEP, and Tarleton State. He played college football for Angelo State as a safety.

== Head coaching record ==
Year	Team	Overall	Conference	Standing	Bowl/playoffs
UT Permian Basin Falcons (Lone Star Conference) (2016–2022)
2016	UT Permian Basin	2–9	0–9	10th	
2017	UT Permian Basin	2–9	1–7	T–8th	
2018	UT Permian Basin	2–9	1–7	8th	
2019	UT Permian Basin	4–7	2–6	7th	
2020–21	UT Permian Basin	5–0	0–0	N/A	
2021	UT Permian Basin	5–6	3–4	T–5th	L Heritage
2022	UT Permian Basin	5–6	4–5	7th	
UT Permian Basin:		25–36	11–28		
Total:		25–36			
