= 2021 West Florida Argonauts football team =

American college football season

2021 West Florida Argonauts football

GSC co-champion

NCAA Division II First Round, L 30–33 vs. Newberry
- Conference: Gulf South Conference

Ranking
- AFCA: No. 12
- Record: 9–2 (6–1 GSC)
- Head coach: Pete Shinnick (6th season)
- Offensive coordinator: Rudy Carlton (1st season)
- Defensive coordinator: Darian Dulin (5th season)
- Home stadium: Admiral Fetterman Field

2021 Gulf South Conference football standings
	Conf.			Overall
Team	W		L	W		L
No. 2 Valdosta State +^	6	–	1	12	–	2
No. 12 West Florida +^	6	–	1	9	–	2
No. 13 West Georgia ^	5	–	2	9	–	3
West Alabama	4	–	3	6	–	4
Delta State	3	–	4	5	–	6
Mississippi College	2	–	5	4	–	6
North Greenville	2	–	5	5	–	6
Shorter	0	–	7	3	–	8
+ – Conference co-champions; ^ – NCAA Division II playoff participant; Rankings from AFCA poll

The 2021 West Florida Argonauts football team represented the University of West Florida as a member of the Gulf South Conference (GSC) during the 2021 NCAA Division II football season. They were led by sixth-year head coach Pete Shinnick. The Argonauts played their home games at Admiral Fetterman Field in Pensacola, Florida.

== Previous season ==
The Argonauts finished the 2019 season 13–2, 7–1 in Gulf South Conference (GSC) play, to finish second in the conference standings. The 2019 team, won the 2019 NCAA Division II Football Championship by defeating Minnesota State, 48–40 in the 2019 NCAA Division II Football Championship Game.

On August 12, 2020, Gulf South Conference postponed fall competition in 2020 for several sports due to the COVID-19 pandemic. A few months later in November, the conference announced that there would be no spring conference competition in football. Teams that opted-in to compete would have to schedule on their own. The Argonauts did not compete in the 2020 season and opted out of spring competition.

== Schedule ==
West Florida announced their 2021 football schedule on March 24, 2021.

Date	Time	Opponent	Rank	Site	TV	Result	Attendance
September 4	12:00 p.m.	at McNeese State*	No. 1	Cowboy Stadium; Lake Charles, LA	ESPN+	W 42–36	8,665
September 11	6:00 p.m.	Southwest Baptist*	No. 1	Pen Air Field; Pensacola, FL	FloSports	W 63–14	5,463
September 18	6:00 p.m.	at No. 21 Texas A&M–Commerce*	No. 1	Memorial Stadium; Commerce, TX		W 35–17	8,269
September 25	6:00 p.m.	Fort Lauderdale*	No. 1	Admiral Fetterman Field; Pensacola, FL	FloSports	Cancelled	
October 2	6:00 p.m.	at Delta State	No. 1	McCool Stadium; Cleveland, MS	FloSports	W 39–33	4,657
October 9	6:00 p.m.	at North Greenville	No. 1	Younts Stadium; Tigerville, SC	FloSports	W 52–10	2,134
October 16	4:00 p.m.	No. 12 West Georgia^{†}	No. 1	Admiral Fetterman Field; Pensacola, FL	FloSports	L 26–30	7,053
October 23	4:00 p.m.	Shorter	No. 6	Admiral Fetterman Field; Pensacola, FL	FloSports	W 45–23	5,040
October 30	6:00 p.m.	at Mississippi College	No. 5	Robinson-Hale Stadium; Clinton, MS	FloSports	W 63–28	4,238
November 6	1:00 p.m.	at No. 23 West Alabama	No. 4	Tiger Stadium; Livingston, AL	FloSports	W 47–7	1,633
November 13	4:00 p.m.	No. 2 Valdosta State	No. 3	Admiral Fetterman Field; Pensacola, FL	FloSports	W 61–42	7,193
November 20	1:00 p.m.	Newberry*	No. 2	Admiral Fetterman Field; Pensacola, FL (NCAA Division II First Round)	UWF Sports Network	L 30–33	4,086
*Non-conference game; ^{†}Homecoming; Rankings from AFCA Poll released prior to the game; All times are in Central time

== Rankings ==
Ranking movements Legend: ██ Increase in ranking ██ Decrease in ranking ( ) = First-place votes
	Week												
Poll	Pre	1	2	3	4	5	6	7	8	9	10	11	Final
AFCA	1 (28)	1 (28)	1 (29)	1 (30)	1 (30)	1 (30)	1 (30)	6	5	4	3	2	12

== Notes ==
1. West Florida's game against Fort Lauderdale on September 25, 2021, was canceled due to the Fort Lauderdale Eagles unable to field a team.
