= 2021 West Georgia Wolves football team =

American college football season

2021 West Georgia Wolves football

NCAA Division II Second Round, L 35–66 vs. Valdosta State
- Conference: Gulf South Conference

Ranking
- AFCA: No. 13
- Record: 9–3 (5–2 GSC)
- Head coach: David Dean (5th season)
- Offensive coordinator: Graham Craig (3rd season)
- Defensive coordinator: Nate Masters (2nd season)
- Home stadium: University Stadium

2021 Gulf South Conference football standings
	Conf.			Overall
Team	W		L	W		L
No. 2 Valdosta State +^	6	–	1	12	–	2
No. 12 West Florida +^	6	–	1	9	–	2
No. 13 West Georgia ^	5	–	2	9	–	3
West Alabama	4	–	3	6	–	4
Delta State	3	–	4	5	–	6
Mississippi College	2	–	5	4	–	6
North Greenville	2	–	5	5	–	6
Shorter	0	–	7	3	–	8
+ – Conference co-champions; ^ – NCAA Division II playoff participant; Rankings from AFCA Poll

The 2021 West Georgia Wolves football team represented the University of West Georgia as a member of the Gulf South Conference (GSC) during the 2021 NCAA Division II football season. They were led by fifth-year head coach David Dean. The Wolves played their home games at University Stadium in Carrollton, Georgia.

On August 12, 2020, Gulf South Conference postponed fall competition in 2020 for several sports due to the COVID-19 pandemic. A few months later in November, the conference announced that there will be no spring conference competition in football. Teams that opt-in to compete would have to schedule on their own. The Wolves did not compete in the 2020 season and opted out of spring competition.

== Schedule ==
West Georgia announced their 2021 football schedule on May 3, 2021.

Date	Time	Opponent	Rank	Site	TV	Result	Attendance
September 2	7:00 p.m.	at No. 24 Carson–Newman*		Burke–Tarr Stadium; Jefferson City, TN		W 45–7	2,116
September 11	6:00 p.m.	Morehouse*	No. 24	University Stadium; Carrollton, GA		W 47–0	3,510
September 18	6:00 p.m.	No. 22 Delta State	No. 18	University Stadium; Carrollton, GA	FloSports	W 27–26	1,005
September 25	1:00 p.m.	at Shorter	No. 14	Barron Stadium; Rome, GA	FloSports	W 56–0	1,172
October 2	6:00 p.m.	No. 15 West Alabama	No. 9	University Stadium; Carrollton, GA	FloSports	L 20–38	2,217
October 9	3:00 p.m.	at Mississippi College	No. 13	Robinson-Hale Stadium; Clinton, MS	FloSports	W 40–21	3,278
October 16	5:00 p.m.	at No. 1 West Florida	No. 12	Blue Wahoos Stadium; Pensacola, FL	FloSports	W 30–26	7,053
October 23	6:00 p.m.	North Greenville^{†}	No. 4	University Stadium; Carrollton, GA	FloSports	W 34–12	2,475
October 30	7:00 p.m.	at No. 2 Valdosta State	No. 3	Bazemore–Hyder Stadium; Valdosta, GA (rivalry)	FloSports	L 34–36	6,102
November 13	1:00 p.m.	Delta State *	No. 11	University Stadium; Carrollton, GA	FloSports	W 44–7	1,518
November 20	1:00 p.m.	at No. 16 Albany State*	No. 13	Albany State University Coliseum; Albany, GA (NCAA Division II First Round)		W 23–7	3,451
November 27	1:00 p.m.	at No. 5 Valdosta State*	No. 13	Bazemore–Hyder Stadium; Valdosta, GA (NCAA Division II Second Round / rivalry)		L 35–66	2,087
*Non-conference game; ^{†}Homecoming; Rankings from AFCA Poll released prior to the game; All times are in Eastern time

== Rankings ==
Ranking movements Legend: ██ Increase in ranking ██ Decrease in ranking RV = Received votes
	Week												
Poll	Pre	1	2	3	4	5	6	7	8	9	10	11	Final
AFCA	RV	24	18	14	9	13	12	4	3	12	11	13	13

== Notes ==
1. West Georgia's game against Delta State on November 13, 2021, is a non-conference game despite both teams being GSC members, to balance the effect on each team's schedule of Florida Tech cancelling its football program.
