= Brett Gilliland =

American football player and coach (born 1981)

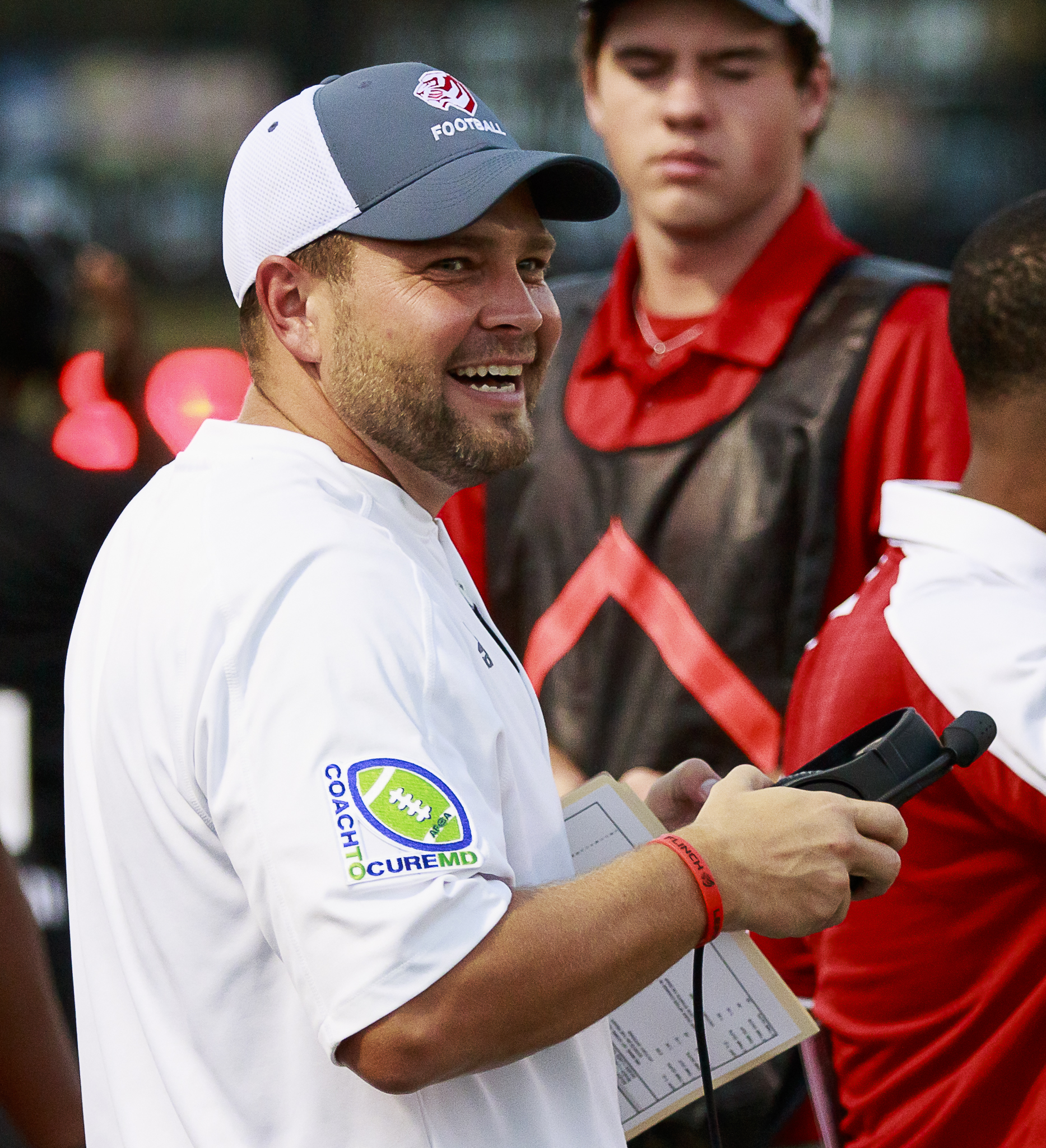

Current position
- Title: Athletic director
- Team: West Alabama
- Conference: GSC

Biographical details
- Born: June 2, 1981 (age 45); Pensacola, Florida, U.S.

Playing career
- 2000–2003: West Alabama
- Position: Quarterback

Coaching career (HC unless noted)
- 2004: West Alabama (WR)
- 2006–2009: Georgia Tech (GA)
- 2010: Georgia Southern (RB)
- 2011: Georgia Southern (TE/OT)
- 2012: Georgia Southern (WR)
- 2013: Kennesaw State (QB)
- 2014–2024: West Alabama

Head coaching record
- Overall: 71–43
- Tournaments: 1–3 (NCAA D-II playoffs)

Accomplishments and honors

Championships
- 1 GSC (2017)

Awards
- GSC Coach of the Year (2017)

Brett Gilliland (born June 2, 1981) is an American college football coach and college administrator who is currently the athletic director at the University of West Alabama. He previously served as the head coach of the West Alabama football program for 10 seasons, stepping down to become the university's permanent AD after being named to the role on an interim basis in 2024 after the retirement of Kent Partridge.

Gilliland played quarterback for the Tigers from 2000 to 2003 where he set several school records. He began his coaching career in 2004 and held assistant coaching positions at West Alabama, Georgia Tech, Georgia Southern and Kennesaw State. Gilliland was announced as West Alabama's 21st head coach on December 9, 2013. Gilliland resigned as head coach after the 2024 season to become athletic director at West Alabama.

== Head coaching record ==
Year	Team	Overall	Conference	Standing	Bowl/playoffs	AFCA^{#}	D2^{°}
West Alabama Tigers (Gulf South Conference) (2014–2024)
2014	West Alabama	5–6	2–5	6th			
2015	West Alabama	7–4	3–4	5th			
2016	West Alabama	7–4	6–2	T–2nd			
2017	West Alabama	10–3	7–1	1st	L NCAA Division II Quarterfinal	12	
2018	West Alabama	8–4	5–3	T–3rd	L NCAA Division II First Round		
2019	West Alabama	6–5	3–5	T–6th			
2020–21	West Alabama	2–0	0–0	N/A			
2021	West Alabama	7–4	4–3	4th			
2022	West Alabama	5–6	3–4	T–4th			
2023	West Alabama	5–5	4–4	T–5th			
2024	West Alabama	9–2	5–1	2nd	L NCAA Division II First Round	18	16
West Alabama:		71–43	42–32				
Total:		71–43					
National championship Conference title Conference division title or championship game berth

== Filmography ==
Film and television
Year	Title	Role	Notes
2009	Pros vs. Joes	Himself	Episode: "Rich Gannon to Tim Brown!"
