= Bill Maskill =

American football coach and former player

Playing career
- 1969–1970: Western Kentucky
- Position: Quarterback

Coaching career (HC unless noted)
- 1971: Iowa (GA)
- 1972–1973: Northern Michigan (LB/DB)
- 1974: Bowling Green (DB)
- 1975–1977: Vanderbilt (DB)
- 1978–1979: Arizona State (DB)
- 1980: Louisville (DB)
- 1981–1982: Tulane (DB)
- 1983–1987: Oregon (LB/DB)
- 1988–1989: Southeast Missouri State
- 1990–1992: Wake Forest (DB/WR)
- 1993–1996: SMU (DB/LB/ST)
- 1997–2001: Vanderbilt (TE/HB/ST)
- 2002–2023: Midwestern State

Head coaching record
- Overall: 173–79
- Tournaments: 2–7 (NCAA D-II playoffs)

Accomplishments and honors

Championships
- 1 MIAA (1988); 5 LSC (2009, 2011–2012, 2017, 2021); 3 LSC South Division (2002, 2004, 2009)

Bill Maskill Jr. is an American college football coach and former player. He was the head football coach for Midwestern State University from 2002 to 2023. Maskill served as the head football coach at Southeast Missouri State University from 1988 to 1989.

== Head coaching record ==
Year	Team	Overall	Conference	Standing	Bowl/playoffs	AFCA^{#}
Southeast Missouri State Indians (Missouri Intercollegiate Athletic Association) (1988–1989)
1988	Southeast Missouri State	6–4	5–1	T–1st		
1989	Southeast Missouri State	7–4	7–3	3rd		
Southeast Missouri State:		13–8	12–4			
Midwestern State Mustangs (Lone Star Conference) (2002–2023)
2002	Midwestern State	7–4	6–2 / 4–1	T–2nd / 1st (South)		
2003	Midwestern State	7–3	6–2 / 4–2	T–2nd / 3rd (South)		
2004	Midwestern State	8–3	7–2 / 5–1	T–2nd / T–1st (South)	L NCAA Division II First Round	
2005	Midwestern State	6–4	5–4 / 3–3	T–4th / T–3rd (South)		
2006	Midwestern State	10–3	7–2 / 4–2	T–2nd / T–3rd (South)	L NCAA Division II Second Round	17
2007	Midwestern State	8–3	6–3 / 3–3	4th / 4th (South)		25
2008	Midwestern State	6–4	5–4 / 3–3	T–7th / T–3rd (South)		
2009	Midwestern State	9–3	7–2 / 4–2	T–1st / T–1st (South)	L NCAA Division II First Round	14
2010	Midwestern State	8–4	7–3 / 3–3	4th / 4th (South)		
2011	Midwestern State	10–1	8–0	1st	L NCAA Division II Second Round	7
2012	Midwestern State	9–2	7–1	T–1st	L NCAA Division II First Round	16
2013	Midwestern State	7–3	3–3	4th		
2014	Midwestern State	6–4	5–2	T–2nd		
2015	Midwestern State	10–2	5–1	2nd	L NCAA Division II Second Round	9
2016	Midwestern State	8–3	7–2	2nd		24
2017	Midwestern State	10–1	8–0	1st	L NCAA Division II Second Round	11
2018	Midwestern State	8–2	6–2	3rd		
2019	Midwestern State	5–6	3–5	6th		
2020–21	Midwestern State	1–2	0–0	N/A		
2021	Midwestern State	7–3	6–1	1st		
2022	Midwestern State	6–5	5–4	T–3rd		
2023	Midwestern State	4–6	3–5	5th		
Midwestern State:		161–70	122–50			
Total:		173–79				
National championship Conference title Conference division title or championship game berth
