= 2021 Valdosta State Blazers football team =

American college football season

2021 Valdosta State Blazers football

GSC co-champion

NCAA Division II Championship Game, L 17–58 vs. Ferris State
- Conference: Gulf South Conference

Ranking
- AFCA: No. 2
- Record: 12–2 (6–1 GSC)
- Head coach: Gary Goff (3rd season)
- Offensive coordinator: Phillip Ely (1st season)
- Defensive coordinator: Jason Semore (1st season)
- Home stadium: Bazemore–Hyder Stadium

2021 Gulf South Conference football standings
	Conf.			Overall
Team	W		L	W		L
No. 2 Valdosta State +^	6	–	1	12	–	2
No. 12 West Florida +^	6	–	1	9	–	2
No. 13 West Georgia ^	5	–	2	9	–	3
West Alabama	4	–	3	6	–	4
Delta State	3	–	4	5	–	6
Mississippi College	2	–	5	4	–	6
North Greenville	2	–	5	5	–	6
Shorter	0	–	7	3	–	8
+ – Conference co-champions; ^ – NCAA Division II playoff participant; Rankings from AFCA Poll

The 2021 Valdosta State Blazers football team represented Valdosta State University as a member of the Gulf South Conference (GSC) during the 2021 NCAA Division II football season. They were led by third-year head coach Gary Goff. The Blazers played their home games at Bazemore–Hyder Stadium in Valdosta, Georgia.

The Blazers competed for the 2021 NCAA Division II Football Championship Game against Ferris State. This was their first appearance in the championship game since the 2018 game.

== Schedule ==
Date	Time	Opponent	Rank	Site	TV	Result	Attendance	Source
September 4	7:00 p.m.	Savannah State*	No. 6	Bazemore–Hyder Stadium; Valdosta, GA	FloSports	W 53–7	5,003	
September 11	5:00 p.m.	at Virginia Union*	No. 5	Hovey Field; Richmond, VA		W 51–7	5,019	
September 18	7:00 p.m.	Albany State*	No. 4	Bazemore–Hyder Stadium; Valdosta, GA	FloSports	W 21–3	3,376	
October 2	7:00 p.m.	Shorter	No. 4	Bazemore–Hyder Stadium; Valdosta, GA	FloSports	W 49–13	5,346	
October 9	7:00 p.m.	Delta State	No. 4	Bazemore–Hyder Stadium; Valdosta, GA	FloSports	W 55–0	3,063	
October 16	2:00 p.m.	at No. 10 West Alabama	No. 4	Tiger Stadium; Livingston, AL	FloSports	W 42–17	2,563	
October 23	3:00 p.m.	at Mississippi College	No. 2	Robinson-Hale Stadium; Clinton, MS	FloSports	W 41–14	1,256	
October 30	7:00 p.m.	No. 3 West Georgia	No. 2	Bazemore–Hyder Stadium; Valdosta, GA (rivalry)	FloSports	W 36–34	6,102	
November 6	3:00 p.m.	North Greenville^{†}	No. 2	Bazemore–Hyder Stadium; Valdosta, GA	FloSports	W 31–21	4,781	
November 13	5:00 p.m.	at No. 3 West Florida	No. 2	Admiral Fetterman Field; Pensacola, FL	FloSports	L 42–61	7,193	
November 27	1:00 p.m.	No. 13 West Georgia*	No. 5	Bazemore–Hyder Stadium; Valdosta, GA (NCAA Division II Second Round)		W 66–35	2,087	
December 4	1:00 p.m.	No. 10 Bowie State*	No. 5	Bazemore–Hyder Stadium; Valdosta, GA (NCAA Division II Quarterfinal)		W 41–17	2,444	
December 11	12:00 p.m.	No. 9 Colorado Mines*	No. 5	Bazemore–Hyder Stadium; Valdosta, GA (NCAA Division II Semifinal)	ESPN+	W 34–31	3,197	
December 18	9:00 p.m.	vs. No. 1 Ferris State*	No. 5	McKinney ISD Stadium; McKinney, TX (NCAA Division II Championship Game)	ESPNU	L 17–58	3,933	
*Non-conference game; ^{†}Homecoming; Rankings from AFCA Poll released prior to the game; All times are in Eastern time

== Rankings ==
Ranking movements Legend: ██ Increase in ranking ██ Decrease in ranking т = Tied with team above or below ( ) = First-place votes
	Week												
Poll	Pre	1	2	3	4	5	6	7	8	9	10	11	Final
AFCA	6–T	5	4	4	4	4	4	2 (7)	2 (4)	2 (6)	2 (5)	5	2

== Before the season ==
The Blazers finished the 2019 season 10–1, 8–0 in Gulf South Conference (GSC) play, to finish first in the conference standings. On August 12, 2020, Gulf South Conference postponed fall competition in 2020 for several sports due to the COVID-19 pandemic. A few months later in November, the conference announced that there will be no spring conference competition in football. Teams that opt-in to compete would have to schedule on their own. The Blazers did not compete in the 2020 season and opted out of spring competition.
