= 2021 Mississippi College Choctaws football team =

American college football season

2021 Mississippi College Choctaws football
- Conference: Gulf South Conference
- Record: 4–6 (2–5 GSC)
- Head coach: John Bland (8th season)
- Offensive coordinator: Tommy Laurendine (4th season)
- Defensive coordinator: Tony Gilbert (3rd season)
- Home stadium: Robinson-Hale Stadium

2021 Gulf South Conference football standings
	Conf.			Overall
Team	W		L	W		L
No. 2 Valdosta State +^	6	–	1	12	–	2
No. 12 West Florida +^	6	–	1	9	–	2
No. 13 West Georgia ^	5	–	2	9	–	3
West Alabama	4	–	3	6	–	4
Delta State	3	–	4	5	–	6
Mississippi College	2	–	5	4	–	6
North Greenville	2	–	5	5	–	6
Shorter	0	–	7	3	–	8
+ – Conference co-champions; ^ – NCAA Division II playoff participant; Rankings from AFCA Poll

The 2021 Mississippi College Choctaws football team represented Mississippi College as a member of the Gulf South Conference (GSC) during the 2021 NCAA Division II football season. They were led by eighth-year head coach John Bland. The Choctaws played their home games at Robinson-Hale Stadium in Clinton, Mississippi.

== Schedule ==
Mississippi College announced their 2021 football schedule on August 3, 2021.

Date	Time	Opponent	Site	TV	Result	Attendance
September 2	6:00 p.m.	Albany State*	Robinson-Hale Stadium; Clinton, MS		L 0–24	3,134
September 18	2:00 p.m.	Fort Lauderdale*	Robinson–Hale Stadium; Clinton, MS		W 63–0	2,879
September 25	7:00 p.m.	No. 21 West Alabama	Robinson–Hale Stadium; Clinton, MS	FloSports	L 28–31	2,954
October 2	2:00 p.m.	at North Greenville	Younts Stadium; Tigerville, SC	FloSports	W 42–21	3,421
October 9	2:00 p.m.	No. 13 West Georgia	Robinson–Hale Stadium; Clinton, MS	FloSports	L 21–40	3,278
October 16	12:00 p.m.	at Shorter	Barron Stadium; Rome, GA	FloSports	W 20–7	1,521
October 23	2:00 p.m.	No. 2 Valdosta State	Robinson–Hale Stadium; Clinton, MS	FloSports	L 14–41	1,256
October 30	6:00 p.m.	No. 5 West Florida^{†}	Robinson–Hale Stadium; Clinton, MS	FloSports	L 28–63	4,238
November 6	2:00 p.m.	at Delta State	McCool Stadium; Cleveland, MS (rivalry)	FloSports	L 21–24 ^{OT}	3,768
November 13	12:00 p.m.	at West Alabama *	Tiger Stadium; Livingston, AL	FloSports	W 28–24	2,491
*Non-conference game; ^{†}Homecoming; Rankings from AFCA Poll released prior to the game; All times are in Central time

== Notes ==
1. Mississippi College's game against West Alabama on November 13, 2021, is a non-conference game despite both teams being GSC members.
