= 2020 West Texas A&M Buffaloes football team =

American college football season

2020 West Texas A&M Buffaloes football
- Conference: Lone Star Conference
- Record: 3–3 ( LSC)
- Head coach: Hunter Hughes (4th season)
- Offensive coordinator: Russ Martin (1st season)
- Offensive scheme: Spread
- Defensive coordinator: Joe Morris (2nd season)
- Base defense: 3–4
- Home stadium: Buffalo Stadium

2020 Lone Star Conference football standings
	Conf.			Overall
Team	W		L	W		L
UT Permian Basin		–		5	–	0
West Texas A&M		–		3	–	3
Angelo State		–		2	–	2
Midwestern State		–		1	–	2
Western New Mexico		–		0	–	1
Texas A&M–Kingsville		–		0	–	2
Notes: Due to COVID-19, the Lone South Conference suspended the fall 2020 football season. The conference also announced no in-conference competition for spring 2021 play. Schools scheduled own games if desired to play either in the fall or spring. Eastern New Mexico and Texas A&M–Commerce opted out of the season.

The 2020 West Texas A&M Buffaloes football team represented West Texas A&M University during the 2020–21 NCAA Division II football season as a member of the Lone Star Conference (LSC). The Buffaloes were led by fourth-year head coach Hunter Hughes and played their home games at Buffalo Stadium in Canyon, Texas.

Due to the COVID-19 pandemic, the season was shortened. The university announced that the football team would play during the fall with the intention of playing a maximum of five games. After the NCAA announced that it would be giving players an extra year of eligibility, the university announced that it was looking to expand the football schedule to ten games. The Buffaloes were one of the few LSC teams to play in fall 2020 instead of spring 2021. During the shortened season, the Buffaloes finished with a record of 3–3.

== Schedule ==
Due to the COVID-19 pandemic, the Lone Star Conference announced that there would be no in-conference competition. The Buffaloes' 2020 schedule officially consisted of all non-conference games, with the games against fellow LSC member Angelo State being considered non-conference matches.

Date	Time	Opponent	Site	TV	Result	Attendance
September 19	7:00 p.m.	Oklahoma Panhandle State*	Buffalo Stadium; Canyon, TX		W 58–7	4,500
September 26	6:00 p.m.	at Angelo State*	LeGrand Sports Complex; San Angelo, TX		L 10–21	2,875
October 3	4:00 p.m.	at Stephen F. Austin*	Homer Bryce Stadium; Nacogdoches, TX	ESPN3	L 6–34	5,035
~~October 17~~	~~6:00 p.m.~~	at ~~Abilene Christian~~*	~~Wildcat Stadium~~; ~~Abilene, TX~~	~~ESPN+~~	No contest	
October 24	6:00 p.m.	Angelo State*	Buffalo Stadium; Canyon, TX		W 34–27	4,000
October 31	6:00 p.m.	North American*	Buffalo Stadium; Canyon, TX		W 56–0	2,500
~~November 14~~	~~4:00 p.m.~~	~~Missouri Western~~*	~~Buffalo Stadium~~; ~~Canyon, TX~~		No contest	
November 21	12:00 p.m.	Pittsburg State*	Buffalo Stadium; Canyon, TX		L 28–42	1,500
*Non-conference game; All times are in Central time

== Game summaries ==
=== Oklahoma Panhandle State ===
Oklahoma Panhandle State Aggies at West Texas A&M Buffaloes – Game summary

Quarter	1	2	3	4	Total
Aggies	0	7	0	0	7
Buffaloes	21	14	17	6	58

at Buffalo Stadium, Canyon, Texas

- Date: September 19
- Game time: 7:00 p.m. CDT
- Game weather: Clear skies, 81 °F (27 °C)
- Game attendance: 4,500
- Referee: Edgar Reed
- Box score, Recap

Game information
First quarter
- WT – Markell Stephens-Peppers 48-yard pass from Nick Gerber (Mauricio Gonzalez kick), 12:40. Buffaloes 7–0. Drive: 2 plays, 61 yards, 0:28.
- WT – Jordan Johnson 3-yard pass from Nick Gerber (Brady Ellsworth kick), 9:17. Buffaloes 14–0. Drive: 5 plays, 43 yards, 1:55.
- WT – Devin Neal 13-yard pass from Nick Gerber (Gage Urias kick), 0:00. Buffaloes 21–0. Drive: 1 play, 13 yards, 0:01.

Second quarter

- WT – Prince Ugwu 2-yard run (Brayden Welch kick), 10:44. Buffaloes 28–0. Drive: 6 plays, 72 yards, 2:51.
- OPSU – Jamalrian Jones 3-yard run (Matthew Lopez kick), 5:19. Buffaloes 28–7. Drive: 4 plays, 46 yards, 1:11.
- WT – Chase Sojka 61-yard pass from Caleb Arreola (Mauricio Gonzalez kick), 4:02. Buffaloes 35–7. Drive: 3 plays, 67 yards, 1:16.

Third quarter

- WT – Jarrod Compton 11-yard run (Brady Ellsworth kick), 12:39. Buffaloes 42–7. Drive: 6 plays, 70 yards, 2:20.
- WT – Brandon Blair 40-yard run (Gage Urias kick), 7:44. Buffaloes 49–7. Drive: 6 plays, 80 yards, 2:34.
- WT – Mauricio Gonzalez 20-yard field goal, 0:00. Buffaloes 52–7. Drive: 11 plays, 66 yards, 6:00.

Fourth quarter

- WT – Isaiah Smallwood 72-yard run (kick failed), 5:13. Buffaloes 58–7. Drive: 4 plays, 89 yards, 1:52.

Statistics	OPSU	WT
First downs	9	27
Total yards	190	663
Rushing yards	63	415
Passing yards	127	248
Turnovers	0	3
Time of possession	33:08	26:52

Team	Category	Player	Statistics
Oklahoma Panhandle State	Passing	K. C. Crandall	7/12, 74 yards
Oklahoma Panhandle State	Rushing	Danny Valverde	5 rushes, 16 yards
Oklahoma Panhandle State	Receiving	Seth Barbino	8 receptions, 74 yards
West Texas A&M	Passing	Nick Gerber	16/17, 187 yards, 3 TD
West Texas A&M	Rushing	Brandon Blair	6 rushes, 115 yards, TD
West Texas A&M	Receiving	Markell Stephens-Peppers	5 receptions, 82 yards, TD

=== At Angelo State ===
West Texas A&M Buffaloes at Angelo State Rams – Game summary

Quarter	1	2	3	4	Total
Buffaloes	7	3	0	0	10
Rams	0	14	0	7	21

at LeGrand Sports Complex, San Angelo, Texas

- Date: September 26
- Game time: 6:00 p.m. CDT
- Game attendance: 2,875
- Box score, Recap

Game information
First quarter
- WT – Kenneath Redd 3-yard pass from Nick Gerber (Mauricio Gonzalez kick), 7:23. Buffaloes 7–0. Drive: 12 plays, 66 yards, 5:36.

Second quarter

- ASU – Carl Odom 2-yard run (Jared Defelice kick), 13:55. Tied 7–7. Drive: 10 plays, 69 yards, 4:11.
- ASU – Nathaniel Omaye 6-yard run (Jared Defelice kick), 5:33. Rams 14–7. Drive: 13 plays, 69 yards, 5:10.
- WT – Mauricio Gonzalez 33-yard field goal, 2:26. Rams 14–10. Drive: 6 plays, 27 yards, 2:58.

Third quarter

- No scoring plays

Fourth quarter

- ASU – Alfred Grear 2-yard run (Jared Defelice kick), 14:40. Rams 21–10. Drive: 13 plays, 62 yards, 4:50.

Statistics	WT	ASU
First downs	14	21
Total yards	291	372
Rushing yards	86	178
Passing yards	205	194
Turnovers	1	0
Time of possession	28:42	31:18

Team	Category	Player	Statistics
West Texas A&M	Passing	Nick Gerber	19/33, 205 yards, TD, INT
West Texas A&M	Rushing	Brandon Blair	7 rushes, 31 yards
West Texas A&M	Receiving	Chase Sojka	4 receptions, 76 yards
Angelo State	Passing	Zach Bronkhorst	18/28, 178 yards
Angelo State	Rushing	Nathaniel Omaye	16 rushes, 75 yards, TD
Angelo State	Receiving	Dagen Dunham	2 receptions, 47 yards

=== At Stephen F. Austin ===
West Texas A&M Buffaloes at Stephen F. Austin Lumberjacks – Game summary

Quarter	1	2	3	4	Total
Buffaloes	0	0	3	3	6
Lumberjacks	17	0	7	10	34

at Homer Bryce Stadium, Nacogdoches, Texas

- Date: October 3
- Game time: 4:00 p.m. CDT
- Game weather: Sunny, 79 °F (26 °C)
- Game attendance: 5,035
- Referee: Scott Hardin
- Box score, Recap

Game information
First quarter
- SFA – Da'leon Ward 69-yard run (Chris Campos kick), 13:34. Lumberjacks 7–0. Drive: 5 plays, 80 yards, 1:26.
- SFA – Xavier Gibson 28-yard pass from Trae Self (Chris Campos kick), 11:25. Lumberjacks 14–0. Drive: 4 plays, 51 yards, 1:14.
- SFA – Chris Campos 22-yard field goal, 0:30. Lumberjacks 17–0. Drive: 14 plays, 80 yards, 7:00.

Second quarter

- No scoring plays

Third quarter

- WT – Mauricio Gonzalez 35-yard field goal, 10:14. Lumberjacks 17–3. Drive: 10 plays, 53 yards, 4:40.
- SFA – Remi Simmons 63-yard pass from Trae Self (Chris Campos kick), 9:03. Lumberjacks 24–3. Drive: 3 plays, 78 yards, 1:04.

Fourth quarter

- SFA – Chris Campos 29-yard field goal, 13:39. Lumberjacks 27–3. Drive: 17 plays, 67 yards, 8:29.
- WT – Mauricio Gonzalez 44-yard field goal, 9:05. Lumberjacks 27–6. Drive: 5 plays, 19 yards, 1:22.
- SFA – Turn JaQuarion 12-yard run (Chris Campos kick), 5:25. Lumberjacks 34–6. Drive: 7 plays, 75 yards, 3:40.

Statistics	WT	SFA
First downs	17	21
Total yards	294	498
Rushing yards	120	234
Passing yards	174	264
Turnovers	1	1
Time of possession	30:01	29:59

Team	Category	Player	Statistics
West Texas A&M	Passing	Nick Gerber	16/36, 174 yards, INT
West Texas A&M	Rushing	Khalil Harris	14 rushes, 47 yards
West Texas A&M	Receiving	Devin Neal	3 receptions, 61 yards
Stephen F. Austin	Passing	Trae Self	12/24, 234 yards, 2 TD, INT
Stephen F. Austin	Rushing	Da'leon Ward	11 rushes, 111 yards, TD
Stephen F. Austin	Receiving	Xavier Gibson	4 receptions, 124 yards, TD

=== Angelo State ===
Angelo State Rams at West Texas A&M Buffaloes – Game summary

Quarter	1	2	3	4	Total
Rams	5	7	7	8	27
Buffaloes	0	14	13	7	34

at Buffalo Stadium, Canyon, Texas

- Date: October 24
- Game time: 6:00 p.m.
- Game weather: Partly cloudy, 79 °F (26 °C)
- Game attendance: 4,000
- Referee: Marcus Thornton
- Box score, Recap

Game information
First quarter
- ASU – Team safety, 8:22. Rams 2–0.
- ASU – Dajuan Adkinson 32-yard field goal, 2:20. Rams 5–0. Drive: 11 plays, 60 yards, 5:57.

Second quarter

- ASU – Alfred Grear 17-yard run (Dajuan Adkinson kick), 11:09. Rams 12–0. Drive: 5 plays, 59 yards, 1:40.
- WT – Jordan Johnson 1-yard run (Gage Urias kick), 6:37. Rams 12–7. Drive: 11 plays, 67 yards, 4:13.
- WT – Glen Mbaku 61-yard pass from Nick Gerber (Gage Urias kick), 1:16. Buffaloes 14–12. Drive: 4 plays, 75 yards, 1:06.

Third quarter

- ASU – Alfred Grear 54-yard run (Dajuan Adkinson kick), 12:57. Rams 19–14. Drive: 5 plays, 70 yards, 1:56.
- WT – Jordan Johnson 1-yard run (Gage Urias kick), 8:49. Buffaloes 21–19. Drive: 4 plays, 13 yards, 2:02.
- WT – Satchel Escalante 87-yard interception return (kick failed), 1:29. Buffaloes 27–19.

Fourth quarter

- ASU – Rasheen Green 13-yard pass from Zach Bronkhorst (Zach Bronkhorst pass to Kellen Pachot), 8:53. Tied 27–27. Drive: 7 plays, 87 yards, 3:19.
- WT – Khalil Harris 50-yard run (Gage Urias kick), 7:41. Buffaloes 34–27. Drive: 3 plays, 61 yards, 1:07.

Statistics	ASU	WT
First downs	21	15
Total yards	440	316
Rushing yards	208	132
Passing yards	232	184
Turnovers	3	1
Time of possession	32:45	25:19

Team	Category	Player	Statistics
Angelo State	Passing	Zach Bronkhorst	20/40, 232 yards, TD, 2 INT
Angelo State	Rushing	Alfred Grear	11 rushes, 138 yards, 2 TD
Angelo State	Receiving	Rasheen Green	4 receptions, 65 yards, TD
West Texas A&M	Passing	Nick Gerber	13/22, 184 yards, TD, INT
West Texas A&M	Rushing	Khalil Harris	9 rushes, 93 yards, TD
West Texas A&M	Receiving	Glen Mbaku	1 reception, 61 yards, TD

=== North American ===
North American Stallions at West Texas A&M Buffaloes – Game summary

Quarter	1	2	3	4	Total
Stallions	0	0	0	0	0
Buffaloes	14	28	14	0	56

at Buffalo Stadium, Canyon, Texas

- Date: October 31
- Game time: 6:00 p.m. CDT
- Game weather: Clear skies, 75 °F (24 °C)
- Game attendance: 2,500
- Referee: Keith Schoby
- Box score, Recap

Game information
First quarter
- WT – Chase Sojka 78-yard pass from Nick Gerber (Gage Urias kick), 6:38. Buffaloes 7–0. Drive: 2 plays, 84 yards, 0:34.
- WT – Brandon Blair 11-yard run (Gage Urias kick), 0:43. Buffaloes 14–0. Drive: 7 plays, 57 yards, 3:07.

Second quarter

- WT – Chase Sojka 8-yard pass from Nick Gerber (Gage Urias kick), 10:24. Buffaloes 21–0. Drive: 6 plays, 59 yards, 2:02.
- WT – Brandon Blair 7-yard run (Gage Urias kick), 6:48. Buffaloes 28–0. Drive: 2 plays, 13 yards, 0:49.
- WT – Satchel Escalante 27-yard fumble return (Gage Urias kick), 4:18. Buffaloes 35–0.
- WT – Seth Hogan 3-yard run (Gage Urias kick), 0:14. Buffaloes 42–0. Drive: 6 plays, 48 yards, 1:55.

Third quarter

- WT – Brett Leach 4-yard run (Mauricio Gonzalez kick), 9:18. Buffaloes 49–0. Drive: 9 plays, 67 yards, 5:25.
- WT – Christian Combs 11-yard run (Brady Ellsworth kick), 0:09. Buffaloes 56–0. Drive: 12 plays, 95 yards, 6:49.

Fourth quarter

- No scoring plays

Statistics	NAU	WT
First downs	10	25
Total yards	203	514
Rushing yards	149	345
Passing yards	54	169
Turnovers	2	1
Time of possession	27:51	32:09

Team	Category	Player	Statistics
North American	Passing	Kierre Huey-Cazenave	5/10, 47 yards
North American	Rushing	Kierre Huey-Cazenave	12 rushes, 67 yards
North American	Receiving	Jalin Singleton	2 receptions, 37 yards
West Texas A&M	Passing	Nick Gerber	8/9, 129 yards, 2 TD
West Texas A&M	Rushing	Seth Hogan	11 rushes, 75 yards, TD
West Texas A&M	Receiving	Chase Sojka	2 receptions, 86 yards, 2 TD

=== Pittsburg State ===
Pittsburg State Gorillas at West Texas A&M Buffaloes – Game summary

Quarter	1	2	3	4	Total
Gorillas	14	14	7	7	42
Buffaloes	7	14	7	0	28

at Buffalo Stadium, Canyon, Texas

- Date: November 21
- Game time: 12:00 p.m. CST
- Game weather: Overcast, 50 °F (10 °C)
- Game attendance: 1,500
- Referee: Randy Adams
- Box score, Recap

Game information
First quarter
- PSU – Mak Sexton 1-yard run (Jaden Snyder kick), 13:00. Gorillas 7–0. Drive: 6 plays, 70 yards, 2:00.
- PSU – Kaden Roy 48-yard fumble return (Jaden Snyder kick), 11:47. Gorillas 14–0.
- WT – Maxwell Perez 11-yard pass from Nick Gerber (Gage Urias kick), 9:03. Gorillas 14–7. Drive: 7 plays, 91 yards, 2:38.

Second quarter

- WT – Kenneath Redd 15-yard pass from Nick Gerber (Gage Urias kick), 12:42. Tied 14–14. Drive: 15 plays, 73 yards, 6:09.
- PSU – Tyler Adkins 1-yard run (Jaden Snyder kick), 7:59. Gorillas 21–14. Drive: 12 plays, 82 yards, 4:37.
- WT – Jordan Johnson 3-yard run (Gage Urias kick), 3:38. Tied 21–21. Drive: 10 plays, 75 yards, 4:15.
- PSU – Dylan White 17-yard pass from Mak Sexton (Jaden Snyder kick), 2:06. Gorillas 28–21. Drive: 4 plays, 93 yards, 1:24.

Third quarter

- PSU – Tyler Adkins 13-yard run (Jaden Snyder kick), 10:18. Gorillas 35–21. Drive: 10 plays, 57 yards, 3:41.
- WT – Prince Ugwu 41-yard run (Gage Urias kick), 9:01. Gorillas 35–28. Drive: 3 plays, 75 yards, 1:17.

Fourth quarter

- PSU – Bryce Murphy 31-yard pass from Mak Sexton (Jaden Snyder kick), 13:54. Gorillas 42–28. Drive: 10 plays, 56 yards, 4:12.

Statistics	PSU	WT
First downs	28	26
Total yards	519	500
Rushing yards	248	285
Passing yards	271	215
Turnovers	1	4
Time of possession	32:23	27:37

Team	Category	Player	Statistics
Pittsburg State	Passing	Mak Sexton	21/30, 271 yards, 2 TD, INT
Pittsburg State	Rushing	Tyler Adkins	15 rushes, 104 yards, 2 TD
Pittsburg State	Receiving	Bryce Murphy	8 receptions, 137 yards, TD
West Texas A&M	Passing	Nick Gerber	16/25, 215 yards, 2 TD, INT
West Texas A&M	Rushing	Khalil Harris	22 rushes, 133 yards
West Texas A&M	Receiving	Kenneath Redd	4 receptions, 54 yards, TD
