= 2020 Midwestern State Mustangs football team =

American college football season

2020 Midwestern State Mustangs football
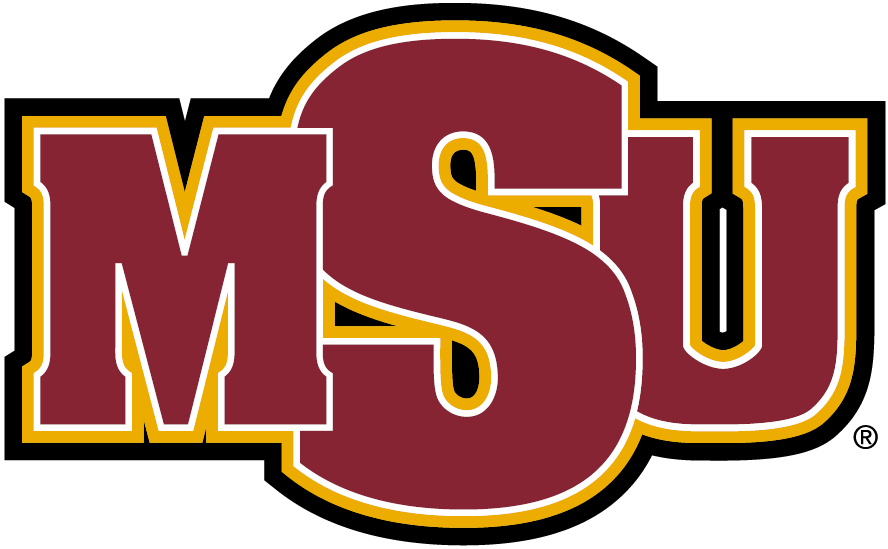
- Conference: Lone Star Conference
- Record: 1–2 (0–0 LSC)
- Head coach: Bill Maskill (19th season)
- Offensive coordinator: Skyler Mornhinweg (1st season)
- Offensive scheme: Multiple
- Defensive coordinator: Rich Renner (13th season)
- Base defense: 4–3
- Home stadium: Memorial Stadium

2020 Lone Star Conference football standings
	Conf.			Overall
Team	W		L	W		L
UT Permian Basin		–		5	–	0
West Texas A&M		–		3	–	3
Angelo State		–		2	–	2
Midwestern State		–		1	–	2
Western New Mexico		–		0	–	1
Texas A&M–Kingsville		–		0	–	2
Notes: Due to COVID-19, the Lone South Conference suspended the fall 2020 football season. The conference also announced no in-conference competition for spring 2021 play. Schools scheduled own games if desired to play either in the fall or spring. Eastern New Mexico and Texas A&M–Commerce opted out of the season.

The 2020 Midwestern State Mustangs football team represented Midwestern State University as a member of the Lone Star Conference (LSC) during the 2020 NCAA Division II football season. Led by 19th-year head coach Bill Maskill, the team compiled a record of 1–2. The Mustangs played their home games at Memorial Stadium in Wichita Falls, Texas.

== Fall season delayed ==
On August 7, 2020, the Lone Star Conference postponed fall competition for several sports due to the COVID-19 pandemic. A few months later in January 2021, the conference announced that there will be no spring conference competition in football. Teams that opt-in to compete would have to schedule on their own.

== Schedule ==
Date	Time	Opponent	Site	Result	Attendance
March 6, 2021	1:00 p.m.	Texas A&M–Kingsville*	Memorial Stadium; Wichita Falls, TX	W 45–34	3,000
March 20, 2021	6:00 p.m.	at Tarleton State*	Memorial Stadium; Stephenville, TX	L 21–33	10,776
March 27, 2021	1:00 p.m.	at UT Permian Basin*	Grande Communications Stadium; Midland, TX	L 21–22 ^{OT}	4,237
*Non-conference game
