= Gary Goff =

American football coach (born 1973)

Current position
- Title: Head coach
- Team: Arkansas–Monticello
- Conference: GAC
- Record: 0–1

Biographical details
- Born: July 19, 1973 (age 53); Picayune, Mississippi, U.S.

Playing career
- 1993–1996: Valdosta State
- Position: Wide receiver

Coaching career (HC unless noted)
- 1999–2000: Cherokee HS (GA) (WR)
- 2001: Woodstock HS (GA) (WR)
- 2002: Iowa Wesleyan (OC/QB)
- 2003–2004: Southeastern Louisiana (OC/WR)
- 2005–2008: New Mexico State (co-OC/WR)
- 2009: Princeton (WR)
- 2010: West Virginia Wesleyan (OC)
- 2011–2018: Tiffin
- 2019–2021: Valdosta State
- 2022–2024: McNeese
- 2026–present: Arkansas–Monticello

Head coaching record
- Overall: 70–77
- Tournaments: 3–2 (NCAA D-II playoffs)

Accomplishments and honors

Championships
- 2 GSC (2019, 2021)

Gary Goff (born July 19, 1973) is an American football coach. Is the current head football coach at The University of Arkansas at Monticello. He was lastly the head football coach at McNeese State University in Lake Charles, Louisiana for three seasons from 2022 until 2024. Goff served as the head football coach at Tiffin University in Tiffin, Ohio from 2011 to 2018 and Valdosta State University in Valdosta, Georgia from 2019 to 2021. He led his Valdosta State team to the NCAA Division II Football Championship Game in 2021, where they lost to Ferris State.

== Head coaching record ==
=== College ===
Year	Team	Overall	Conference	Standing	Bowl/playoffs	AFCA^{#}
Tiffin Dragons (Great Lakes Intercollegiate Athletic Conference) (2011–2017)
2011	Tiffin	0–11	0–10	7th (South)		
2012	Tiffin	3–8	2–8	T–5th (South)		
2013	Tiffin	2–9	1–8	T–6th (South)		
2014	Tiffin	5–6	4–6	T–7th		
2015	Tiffin	5–6	4–6	T–10th		
2016	Tiffin	8–3	7–3	4th		
2017	Tiffin	6–5	5–4	T–4th		
Tiffin Dragons (Great Midwest Athletic Conference) (2018)
2018	Tiffin	9–2	6–2	T–2nd		
Tiffin:		38–50	29–47			
Valdosta State (Gulf South Conference) (2019–2021)
2019	Valdosta State	10–1	8–0	1st	L NCAA Division II Second Round	5
2020–21	No team—COVID-19					
2021	Valdosta State	12–2	6–1	T–1st	L NCAA Division II Championship	2
Valdosta State:		22–3	14–1			
McNeese Cowboys (Southland Conference) (2022–2024)
2022	McNeese	4–7	2–4	6th		
2023	McNeese	0–10	1–6	7th		
2024	McNeese	6–6	3–4	T–5th		
McNeese:		10–23	6–14			
Arkansas-Monticello (Great American Conference) (2026–present)
2026	Arkansas–Monticello	0–1	0–1			
Arkansas–Monticello:		0–1	0–1			
Total:		70–77				
National championship Conference title Conference division title or championship game berth
