= 2021 Delta State Statesmen football team =

American college football season

2021 Delta State Statesmen football
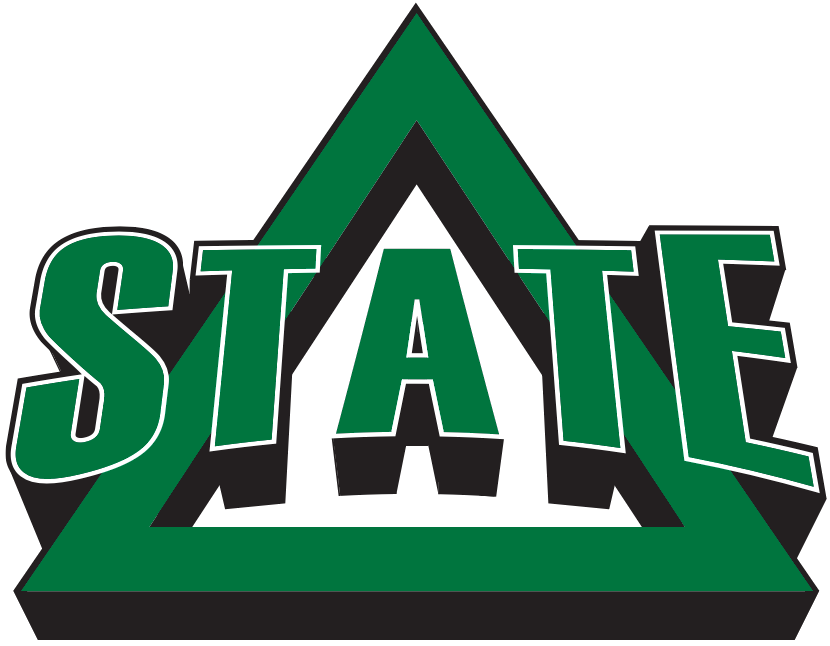
- Conference: Gulf South Conference
- Record: 5–6 (3–4 GSC)
- Head coach: Todd Cooley (9th season)
- Defensive coordinator: Kelvin Green (3rd season)
- Home stadium: Parker Field at Horace McCool Stadium

2021 Gulf South Conference football standings
	Conf.			Overall
Team	W		L	W		L
No. 2 Valdosta State +^	6	–	1	12	–	2
No. 12 West Florida +^	6	–	1	9	–	2
No. 13 West Georgia ^	5	–	2	9	–	3
West Alabama	4	–	3	6	–	4
Delta State	3	–	4	5	–	6
Mississippi College	2	–	5	4	–	6
North Greenville	2	–	5	5	–	6
Shorter	0	–	7	3	–	8
+ – Conference co-champions; ^ – NCAA Division II playoff participant; Rankings from AFCA Poll

The 2021 Delta State Statesmen football team represented Delta State University as a member of the Gulf South Conference (GSC) during the 2021 NCAA Division II football season. They were led by ninth-year head coach Todd Cooley. The Statesmen played their home games at Parker Field at Horace McCool Stadium in Cleveland, Mississippi.

== Previous season ==
The Statesmen finished the 2019 season 6–4, 5–3 in Gulf South Conference (GSC) play, to finish third in the conference standings. On August 12, 2020, Gulf South Conference postponed fall competition in 2020 for several sports due to the COVID-19 pandemic. A few months later in November, the conference announced that there will be no spring conference competition in football. Teams that opt-in to compete would have to schedule on their own. The Statesmen did not compete in the 2020 season and opted out of spring competition.

== Schedule ==
Date	Time	Opponent	Rank	Site	TV	Result	Attendance
September 2	6:00 p.m.	Bethel (TN)*		McCool Stadium; Cleveland, MS	FloSports	W 48–14	3,567
September 11	6:00 p.m.	McKendree*		McCool Stadium; Cleveland, MS	FloSports	W 45–17	6,789
September 18	5:00 p.m.	at No. 18 West Georgia	No. 22	University Stadium; Carrollton, GA	FloSports	L 26–27	1,005
September 25	2:00 p.m.	at Jackson State*	No. 25	Mississippi Veterans Memorial Stadium; Jackson, MS		L 17–24	33,652
October 2	6:00 p.m.	No. 1 West Florida		McCool Stadium; Cleveland, MS	FloSports	L 33–39	4,657
October 9	6:00 p.m.	at No. 4 Valdosta State		Bazemore–Hyder Stadium; Valdosta, GA	FloSports	L 0–55	3,063
October 16	2:00 p.m.	North Greenville		McCool Stadium; Cleveland, MS	FloSports	L 34–42 ^{2OT}	1,002
October 23	4:00 p.m.	at No. 15 West Alabama		Tiger Stadium; Livingston, AL	FloSports	W 35–30	5,023
October 30	2:00 p.m.	Shorter^{†}		McCool Stadium; Cleveland, MS	FloSports	W 14–13	6,825
November 6	2:00 p.m.	Mississippi College		McCool Stadium; Cleveland, MS (rivalry)	FloSports	W 24-21 ^{OT}	3,768
November 13	12:00 p.m.	at No. 11 West Georgia *		University Stadium; Carrollton, GA	FloSports	L 7–44	1,518
*Non-conference game; ^{†}Homecoming; Rankings from AFCA Poll released prior to the game; All times are in Central time

== Rankings ==
Ranking movements Legend: ██ Increase in ranking ██ Decrease in ranking — = Not ranked RV = Received votes
	Week												
Poll	Pre	1	2	3	4	5	6	7	8	9	10	11	Final
AFCA	RV	RV	22	25	RV	—	—	—	—	—	—	—	—

== Notes ==
1. Delta State's game against West Georgia on November 13, 2021, is a non-conference game despite both teams being GSC members.
