= 2020 UT Permian Basin Falcons football team =

American college football season

2020 UT Permian Basin Falcons football
- Conference: Lone Star Conference
- Record: 5–0 (0–0 LSC)
- Head coach: Justin Carrigan (5th season)
- Offensive scheme: Spread
- Co-defensive coordinators: Chris Mineo (5th season); Jacob Martin (5th season)
- Base defense: 3–4
- Home stadium: Grande Communications Stadium

2020 Lone Star Conference football standings
	Conf.			Overall
Team	W		L	W		L
UT Permian Basin		–		5	–	0
West Texas A&M		–		3	–	3
Angelo State		–		2	–	2
Midwestern State		–		1	–	2
Western New Mexico		–		0	–	1
Texas A&M–Kingsville		–		0	–	2
Notes: Due to COVID-19, the Lone South Conference suspended the fall 2020 football season. The conference also announced no in-conference competition for spring 2021 play. Schools scheduled own games if desired to play either in the fall or spring. Eastern New Mexico and Texas A&M–Commerce opted out of the season.

The 2020 UT Permian Basin Falcons football team represented the University of Texas Permian Basin (UTPB) in the 2020–21 NCAA Division II football season as a member of the Lone Star Conference (LSC). The Falcons were led by fifth-year head coach Justin Carrigan.

Due to the COVID-19 pandemic, the season was shortened and postponed to spring 2021. In the shortened season, the Falcons finished 5–0 for the program's first winning and undefeated season.

The team played its home games at Grande Communications Stadium in Midland, Texas as the Falcons' regular home stadium, Ratliff Stadium, was being used as a mass vaccination site.

== Schedule ==
Due to the COVID-19 pandemic, the Lone Star Conference announced that there would be no in-conference competition. The scheduled officially consisted of five non-conference opponents, with the games against fellow LSC members Western New Mexico, Texas A&M–Kingsville, and Midwestern State being considered non-conference matches.

Date	Time	Opponent	Site	Result	Attendance
February 27, 2021	1:00 p.m.	Southern Nazarene*	Grande Communications Stadium; Midland, TX	W 33–14	3,798
March 6, 2021	1:00 p.m.	Lincoln (MO)*	Grande Communications Stadium; Midland, TX	W 54–20	3,876
March 13, 2021	2:00 p.m.	at Western New Mexico*	Altamirano Stadium; Silver City, NM	W 31–6	490
March 20, 2021	1:00 p.m.	at Texas A&M–Kingsville*	Javelina Stadium; Kingsville, TX	W 17–2	2,000
March 27, 2021	1:00 p.m.	Midwestern State*	Grande Communications Stadium; Midland, TX	W 22–21 ^{OT}	4,237
*Non-conference game; All times are in Central time

== Roster ==
2020 UT Permian Basin Falcons football team roster
Players
Coaches
Offense

Pos.	#	Name	Class
WR	2	Kobe Robinson	Jr
RB	6	Adrian Walker	Jr
WR	9	Baylon Ware	Jr
QB	11	Clayton Roberts	Jr
WR	12	MJ Link	Jr
WR	13	Grant Brown	So
RB	15	Taj Crenshaw	Fr
QB	16	Bubba Henson	So
QB	17	Brayden Thomas	Fr
QB	18	David Santos	Fr
RB	20	Jameel Hodges	So
RB	25	Alonso Corral	Fr
WR	27	Clyde Bellow	Fr
RB	35	Ed Williams	Fr
RB	36	Garrett Loudermilk	Fr
TE	45	Matt Zubiate	Jr
RB	47	Jacob Olivares	Fr
TE	48	Rylan Meek	Fr
OL	51	Tyson Carter	Jr
OL	52	William Draker	So
OL	54	Hunter Hickok	Sr
OL	57	Braden Harris	Fr
OL	60	Derrick Assad	So
OL	61	Noah Issa	Fr
OL	63	Ivan Pena	Jr
OL	65	Dawson Reynolds	Fr
OL	67	Pessi Savea	Jr
OL	70	Dakari White	Fr
OL	72	Cedric Truitt	Fr
OL	73	Matt Groeschel	So
OL	75	Ovidio Melendez	Jr
OL	76	Markel Carter	Fr
OL	77	Ramon Diaz	Fr
OL	79	Ryan Wilson	Sr
WR	80	Marcus Molina	Fr
WR	81	Ethan Leyva	Fr
WR	82	Griffin Dougherty	Fr
WR	83	Donta Hayes	Fr
WR	84	Rocky Barnes	Jr
WR	85	Brody Ray	Fr
WR	86	Jordan Smart	Fr
WR	87	Braylon Monroe	Fr
WR	88	Ty'Dedrick Anderson	Fr
TE	89	Brock Johnson	Fr
RB		Corey Johnson	Fr
WR		Oscar Maldonado	So
WR		Corey Randolph	Fr
WR		Antony Shelton	Fr

Defense

Pos.	#	Name	Class
S	1	Donta Stuart	So
S	3	Nygel King	Sr
S	4	JT Walker	Jr
DB	5	Justen Campbell	Jr
DB	7	D'Ondre Robinson	Sr
DB	8	Levon Barnett	Jr
LB	10	Miquon Mayes	Jr
LB	14	Derrian Forge	Jr
CB	21	Jaques Tyler	So
S	22	Frank Kriegbaum	Jr
DL	23	Marquez Byrd	Sr
OLB	24	John O'Kelley	Jr
DB	26	Wayne Landry	Fr
LB	28	Jamil Pittman	So
DB	29	Xavier Phoenix	Fr
LB	30	Dorian Anderson	Fr
S	31	Gunner Adams	So
DB	32	Martin Brown IV	Jr
DB	33	Trent Ward	Jr
LB	34	Jalon Rocquemore	Fr
LB	38	Kadarryus Hartfield	So
S	39	Christian Islas	Fr
LB	42	Hayden Kelly	So
LB	44	Cole Daggett	Fr
DE	46	Beau Narrell	So
DT	53	Stanley Falenofoa	Jr
DE	62	Xavier Daniels	Fr
DT	69	Manuel Lozano	Fr
DL	92	TJ Poloai	Sr
DL	93	Jesiah Whittington	Fr
DL	94	Dominique Varela	So
DT	97	Joseph Williams	Jr
DT	98	La'Daidreain Glasker	Sr
DT	99	Victor Idusuyi	Fr
LB		Jeremiah Abrego	Fr
DB		Mark Bernard	Fr
LB		Abel Clark	Fr
LB		Rocky Savea	Fr
DL		Aven Shelton	Fr

Special teams

Pos.	#	Name	Class
K	41	Hayden Decossas	So
P	49	Sergio Landeros	Jr
P	59	Robert Amador	Fr
K, P		Spencer Cofer	Sr

Head coach

- Justin Carrigan
  Head coach/offensive coordinator

Coordinators/assistant coaches

- Chris Mineo
  Associate head coach/co-defensive coordinator/defensive line
- Jacob Martin
  Co-defensive coordinator/linebackers
- Victor Gill
  Offensive line
- Brandon Burton
  Defensive backs
- Rob Messinger
  Special teams coordinator/wide receivers
- Marquee Allison
  Running backs
- Jared Thames
  Tight ends
- Jonathan Cervantes
  Safeties
- Brady Foltz
  Offensive line
- Cody Gray
  Defensive line

Legend

- (C) Team captain
- (S) Suspended
- (I) Ineligible
- Injured
- Redshirt

Roster
Last update: July 11, 2023

== Game summaries ==
=== Southern Nazarene ===
Southern Nazarene Crimson Storm at UT Permian Basin Falcons – Game summary

Quarter	1	2	3	4	Total
Crimson Storm	0	0	7	7	14
Falcons	7	7	6	13	33

at Grande Communications Stadium, Midland, Texas

- Date: February 27, 2021
- Game time: 1:00 p.m. CST
- Game weather: Sunny, 73 °F (23 °C)
- Game attendance: 3,798
- Referee: Randy Adams
- Box score, Recap

Game information
First quarter
- TPB – Kobe Robinson 22-yard pass from Clayton Roberts (Hayden Decossas kick), 11:19. Falcons 7–0. Drive: 9 plays, 65 yards, 3:27.

Second quarter

- TPB – MJ Link 18-yard pass from Clayton Roberts (Hayden Decossas kick), 9:04. Falcons 14–0. Drive: 9 plays, 75 yards, 4:12.

Third quarter

- SNU – Jaren Alvarado 7-yard pass from Gage Porter (Ryan Reid kick), 12:22. Falcons 14–7. Drive: 5 plays, 65 yards, 2:38.
- TPB – MJ Link 27-yard pass from Clayton Roberts (run failed), 5:29. Falcons 20–7. Drive: 4 plays, 49 yards, 1:43.

Fourth quarter

- SNU – Gage Porter 3-yard run (Ryan Reid kick), 8:47. Falcons 20–14. Drive: 11 plays, 97 yards, 5:27.
- TPB – Baylon Ware 33-yard pass from Clayton Roberts (pass failed), 5:57. Falcons 26–14. Drive: 6 plays, 65 yards, 2:50.
- TPB – Jesiah Whittington 1-yard run (Hayden Decossas kick), 2:20. Falcons 33–14. Drive: 4 plays, 25 yards, 1:23.

Statistics	SNU	TPB
First downs	21	17
Total yards	337	338
Rushing yards	163	167
Passing yards	174	171
Turnovers	2	0
Time of possession	35:41	24:19

Team	Category	Player	Statistics
Southern Nazarene	Passing	Gage Porter	16/30, 149 yards, TD, 2 INT
Southern Nazarene	Rushing	Gage Porter	25 rushes, 115 yards, TD
Southern Nazarene	Receiving	Reid Roelofs	8 receptions, 68 yards
UT Permian Basin	Passing	Clayton Roberts	9/23, 171 yards, 4 TD
UT Permian Basin	Rushing	Clayton Roberts	12 rushes, 101 yards
UT Permian Basin	Receiving	MJ Link	4 receptions, 91 yards, 2 TD

=== Lincoln (MO) ===
Lincoln Blue Tigers at UT Permian Basin Falcons – Game summary

Quarter	1	2	3	4	Total
Blue Tigers	0	6	14	0	20
Falcons	27	0	20	7	54

at Grande Communications Stadium, Midland, Texas

- Date: March 6, 2021
- Game time: 1:00 p.m. CDT
- Game weather: Sunny, 57 °F (14 °C)
- Game attendance: 3,876
- Box score, Recap

Game information
First quarter
- TPB – Kobe Robinson 93-yard kickoff return (kick failed), 14:42. Falcons 6–0.
- TPB – Kobe Robinson 85-yard pass from Clayton Roberts (Hayden Decossas kick), 12:00. Falcons 13–0. Drive: 4 plays, 83 yards, 1:03.
- TPB – Derrian Forge 25-yard interception return (Hayden Decossas kick), 10:26. Falcons 20–0.
- TPB – Martin Brown IV 23-yard punt return (Hayden Decossas kick), 7:55. Falcons 27–0.

Second quarter

- LIN – Chrisshun 3-yard pass from Desmond Hunter (kick blocked), 0:05. Falcons 27–6. Drive: 8 plays, 56 yards, 3:16.

Third quarter

- TPB – Baylon Ware 30-yard pass from Clayton Roberts (Hayden Decossas kick), 13:00. Falcons 34–6. Drive: 1 play, 30 yards, 0:09.
- LIN – Tori Hicks 3-yard run (Javier Moreno kick), 8:50. Falcons 34–13. Drive: 3 plays, 52 yards, 1:05.
- TPB – Baylon Ware 36-yard pass from Clayton Roberts (kick failed), 8:16. Falcons 40–13. Drive: 2 plays, 45 yards, 4:26.
- LIN – Tori Hicks 9-yard pass from Desmond Hunter (Javier Moreno kick), 5:12. Falcons 40–20. Drive: 4 plays, 22 yards, 1:36.
- TPB – Kobe Robinson 19-yard pass from Clayton Roberts (Haydn Decossas kick), 1:02. Falcons 47–20. Drive: 9 plays, 66 yards, 3:55.

Fourth quarter

- TPB – Ed Williams 2-yard run (Hayden Decossas kick), 6:31. Falcons 54–20. Drive: 4 plays, 21 yards, 1:45.

Statistics	LIN	TPB
First downs	13	17
Total yards	248	345
Rushing yards	98	22
Passing yards	150	323
Turnovers	5	1
Time of possession	34:40	25:20

Team	Category	Player	Statistics
Lincoln (MO)	Passing	Desmond Hunter	14/25, 150 yards, 2 TD, 4 INT
Lincoln (MO)	Rushing	Hosea Franklin	23 rushes, 51 yards
Lincoln (MO)	Receiving	CJ Closser	3 receptions, 73 yards
UT Permian Basin	Passing	Clayton Roberts	15/24, 275 yards, 4 TD
UT Permian Basin	Rushing	Brayden Thomas	4 rushes, 13 yards
UT Permian Basin	Receiving	Kobe Robinson	4 receptions, 117 yards, 2 TD

=== At Western New Mexico ===
UT Permian Basin Falcons at Western New Mexico Mustangs – Game summary

Quarter	1	2	3	4	Total
Falcons	7	14	0	10	31
Mustangs	0	6	0	0	6

at Altamirano Stadium, Silver City, New Mexico

- Date: March 13, 2021
- Game time: 2:00 p.m. CST/1:00 p.m. MST
- Game weather: Sunny
- Game attendance: 490
- Referee: Todd Wittlinger
- Box score, Recap

Game information
First quarter
- TPB – MJ Link 10-yard pass from Clayton Roberts (Hayden Decossa kick), 9:47. Falcons 7–0. Drive: 3 plays, 9 yards, 1:15.

Second quarter

- WNM – Michael Martinez 4-yard pass from Brandon Ziarno (kick blocked), 9:42. Falcons 7–6. Drive: 9 plays, 80 yards, 3:43.
- TPB – Trent Ward defensive PAT, 9:42. Falcons 9–6.
- TPB – Hayden Decossas 34-yard field goal, 5:38. Falcons 12–6. Drive: 4 plays, -1 yards, 1:08.
- TPB – Baylon Ware 49-yard pass from Clayton Roberts (Hayden Decossas kick), 1:33. Falcons 19–6. Drive: 2 plays, 49 yards, 0:19.
- TPB – Brandon Ziarno intentional grounding in end zone, 0:00. Falcons 21–6.

Third quarter

- No scoring plays

Fourth quarter

- TPB – Hayden Decossas 33-yard field goal, 14:24. Falcons 24–6. Drive: 16 plays, 82 yards, 8:52.
- TPB – D'Ondre Robinson 43-yard interception return (Hayden Decossas kick), 12:23. Falcons 31–6.

Statistics	TPB	WNM
First downs	14	11
Total yards	193	185
Rushing yards	91	57
Passing yards	102	128
Turnovers	1	3
Time of possession	28:50	30:01

Team	Category	Player	Statistics
UT Permian Basin	Passing	Clayton Roberts	8/23, 80 yards, 2 TD, INT
UT Permian Basin	Rushing	Garrett Loudermilk	14 rushes, 40 yards
UT Permian Basin	Receiving	Baylon Ware	1 reception, 49 yards, TD
Western New Mexico	Passing	Brandon Ziarno	14/35, 128 yards, TD, 3 INT
Western New Mexico	Rushing	DeRje Blanks	6 rushes, 25 yards
Western New Mexico	Receiving	Josh Powell	5 receptions, 77 yards

=== At Texas A&M–Kingsville ===
UT Permian Basin Falcons at Texas A&M–Kingsville Javelinas – Game summary

Quarter	1	2	3	4	Total
Falcons	3	7	0	7	17
Javelinas	0	0	0	2	2

at Javelina Stadium, Kingsville, Texas

- Date: March 20, 2021
- Game time: 1:00 p.m. CST
- Game weather: Partly cloudy, 70 °F (21 °C)
- Game attendance: 2,000
- Box score, Recap

Game information
First quarter
- TPB – Hayden Decossas 25-yard field goal, 9:44. Falcons 3–0. Drive: 6 plays, 85 yards, 2:14.

Second quarter

- TPB – MJ Link 33-yard pass from Brayden Thomas (Hayden Decossas kick), 7:16. Falcons 10–0. Drive: 1 play, 18 yards, 0:08.

Third quarter

- No scoring plays

Fourth quarter

- TAMUK – Sergio Landeros tackled in own end zone, 12:37. Falcons 10–2.
- TPB – MJ Link 99-yard pass from Brayden Thomas (Hayden Decossas kick), 4:22. Falcons 17–2. Drive: 3 plays, 99 yards, 1:22.

Statistics	TPB	TAMUK
First downs	14	12
Total yards	349	200
Rushing yards	57	108
Passing yards	292	92
Turnovers	3	4
Time of possession	29:48	30:12

Team	Category	Player	Statistics
UT Permian Basin	Passing	Brayden Thomas	17/31, 292 yards, 2 TD, 2 INT
UT Permian Basin	Rushing	Garrett Loudermilk	17 rushes, 52 yards
UT Permian Basin	Receiving	MJ Link	5 receptions, 156 yards, 2 TD
Texas A&M–Kingsville	Passing	Zadock Dinklemann	11/24, 74 yards, 2 INT
Texas A&M–Kingsville	Rushing	Christian Anderson	19 rushes, 67 yards
Texas A&M–Kingsville	Receiving	Kevin Reynolds	3 receptions, 30 yards

=== Midwestern State ===
Midwestern State Mustangs at UT Permian Basin Falcons – Game summary

Quarter	1	2	3	4	OT	Total
Mustangs	7	0	0	7	7	21
Falcons	0	7	7	0	8	22

at Grande Communications Stadium, Midland, Texas

- Date: March 27, 2021
- Game time: 1:00 p.m. CST
- Game weather: Sunny
- Game attendance: 4,237
- Box score, Recap

Game information
First quarter
- MSU – Lance Hardman 30-yard interception return (Jacob Rowland kick), 6:55. Mustangs 7–0.

Second quarter

- TPB – Kobe Robinson 16-yard pass from Brayden Thomas (Hayden Decossas kick), 0:05. Tied 7–7. Drive: 6 plays, 87 yards, 0:48.

Third quarter

- TPB – Garrett Loudermilk 2-yard run (Hayden Decossas kick), 1:39. Falcons 14–7. Drive: 8 plays, 55 yards, 4:14.

Fourth quarter

- MSU – Bryce Martinez 11-yard pass from Derrick Ponder (Jacob Rowland kick), 0:49. Tied 14–14. Drive: 10 plays, 69 yards, 2:48.

Overtime

- MSU – K'Vonte Jackson 4-yard run (Justin Rowland kick). Mustangs 21–14. Drive: 4 plays, 25 yards.
- TPB – Matt Zubiate 9-yard pass from Brayden Thomas (Brayden Thomas pass to Kobe Robinson). Falcons 22–21. Drive: 7 plays, 25 yards.

Statistics	MSU	TPB
First downs	18	19
Total yards	303	288
Rushing yards	65	37
Passing yards	238	251
Turnovers	2	1
Time of possession	28:28	31:32

Team	Category	Player	Statistics
Midwestern State	Passing	Derrick Ponder	25/38, 238 yards, TD, INT
Midwestern State	Rushing	K'Vonte Jackson	18 rushes, 65 yards, TD
Midwestern State	Receiving	Ja'Marzeyea Arvie	11 receptions, 95 yards
UT Permian Basin	Passing	Brayden Thomas	19/37, 251 yards, 2 TD, INT
UT Permian Basin	Rushing	Garrett Loudermilk	20 rushes, 80 yards, TD
UT Permian Basin	Receiving	MJ Link	9 receptions, 105 yards

== Statistics ==
=== Scoring ===
Scores against all opponents

	1	2	3	4	OT	Total
Opponents	7	12	21	16	7	63
UT Permian Basin	44	35	33	37	8	157
