= 2021 West Alabama Tigers football team =

American college football season

2021 West Alabama Tigers football
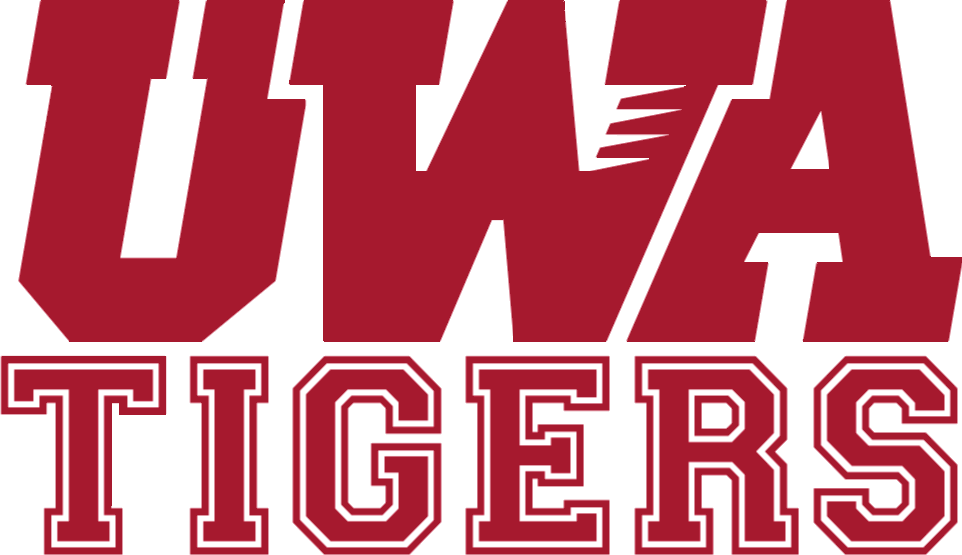
- Conference: Gulf South Conference
- Record: 6–4 (4–3 GSC)
- Head coach: Brett Gilliland (8th season)
- Offensive coordinator: Don Bailey (6th season)
- Defensive coordinator: Steve Sisa (5th season)
- Home stadium: Tiger Stadium

2021 Gulf South Conference football standings
	Conf.			Overall
Team	W		L	W		L
No. 2 Valdosta State +^	6	–	1	12	–	2
No. 12 West Florida +^	6	–	1	9	–	2
No. 13 West Georgia ^	5	–	2	9	–	3
West Alabama	4	–	3	6	–	4
Delta State	3	–	4	5	–	6
Mississippi College	2	–	5	4	–	6
North Greenville	2	–	5	5	–	6
Shorter	0	–	7	3	–	8
+ – Conference co-champions; ^ – NCAA Division II playoff participant; Rankings from AFCA Poll

The 2021 West Alabama Tigers football team represented the University of West Alabama as a member of the Gulf South Conference (GSC) during the 2021 NCAA Division II football season. They were led by eight-year head coach Brett Gilliland. The Tigers played their home games at Tiger Stadium in Livingston, Alabama.

== Schedule ==
Date	Time	Opponent	Rank	Site	TV	Result	Attendance	Source
September 4	6:00 p.m.	Morehouse*		Tiger Stadium; Livingston, AL	FloSports	W 48–7	2,001	
September 11	1:00 p.m.	at Tuskegee*		Abbott Memorial Alumni Stadium; Tuskegee, AL	BSCN/YouTube	W 33–7	835	
September 16	6:40 p.m. (Note: Scheduled as 6:00 pm but delayed because of lightning in the area)	North American*		Tiger Stadium; Livingston, AL	FloSports	W 80–0	2,204	
September 25	7:00 p.m.	at Mississippi College	No. 21	Robinson-Hale Stadium; Clinton, MS	FloSports	W 31–28	2,954	
October 2	5:00 p.m.	at No. 9 West Georgia	No. 15	University Stadium; Carrollton, Georgia	FloSports	W 38–20	2,217	
October 9	noon	at Shorter	No. 10	Barron Stadium; Rome, GA	FloSports	W 44–7	1,025	
October 16	1:00 p.m.	No. 4 Valdosta State	No. 10	Tiger Stadium; Livingston, AL	FloSports	L 17–42	2,563	
October 23	4:00 p.m.	Delta State^{†}	No. 15	Tiger Stadium; Livingston, AL	FloSports	L 35–30	5,023	
October 30	11:00 a.m	at North Greenville		Younts Stadium; Tigerville, SC	FloSports	W 31-14	3,114	
November 6	1:00 p.m.	No. 4 West Florida	No. 23	Tiger Stadium; Livingston, AL	FloSports	L 7-47	1,633	
November 13	1:00 p.m.	Mississippi College*		Tiger Stadium; Livingston, AL	FloSports	L 24–28	2,491	
*Non-conference game; ^{†}Homecoming; Rankings from AFCA Poll released prior to the game; All times are in Central time

The result against North American University on September 16 was the largest victory margin in the team's history. The game against North American University is not included in the Gulf South Conference standings because it was classed as an exhibition game and was not countable due to NCAA policies.

This was the first time that the team had won five games in a row at the start of a season.

== Game summaries ==
=== Morehouse ===
	1	2	3	4	Total
Maroon Tigers	0	0	7	0	7
Tigers	7	24	14	3	48

=== At Tuskegee ===
	1	2	3	4	Total
Tigers	10	10	3	10	33
Golden Tigers	0	0	0	7	7

=== North American ===
	1	2	3	4	Total
Stallions	0	0	0	0	0
Tigers	31	28	14	7	80

=== At Mississippi College ===
	1	2	3	4	Total
No. 21 Tigers	7	7	0	17	31
Choctaws	0	14	7	7	28

=== At No. 9 West Georgia ===
	1	2	3	4	Total
No. 15 Tigers	7	17	14	0	38
No. 9 Wolves	14	3	3	0	20

=== At Shorter ===
	1	2	3	4	Total
No. 10 Tigers	0	14	20	10	44
Hawks	0	0	7	0	7

=== No. 4 Valdosta State ===
	1	2	3	4	Total
No. 4 Blazers	14	14	14	0	42
No. 10 Tigers	14	3	0	0	17

=== Delta State ===
	1	2	3	4	Total
Statesmen	14	7	14	0	35
No. 15 Tigers	3	14	6	7	30

=== At North Greenville ===
	1	2	3	4	Total
Tigers	3	21	7	0	31
Crusaders	0	0	7	7	14

=== No. 4 West Florida ===
	1	2	3	4	Total
No 4. Argonauts	9	21	10	7	47
No. 23 Tigers	0	0	0	7	7

=== Mississippi College ===
	1	2	3	4	Total
Choctaws	7	14	0	7	28
Tigers	0	17	0	7	24

== Rankings ==
Ranking movements Legend: ██ Increase in ranking ██ Decrease in ranking — = Not ranked RV = Received votes
	Week												
Poll	Pre	1	2	3	4	5	6	7	8	9	10	11	Final
AFCA	RV	RV	RV	21	15	10	10	15	RV	23	RV	—	—
