= 2020 West Alabama Tigers football team =

American college football season

2020 West Alabama Tigers football
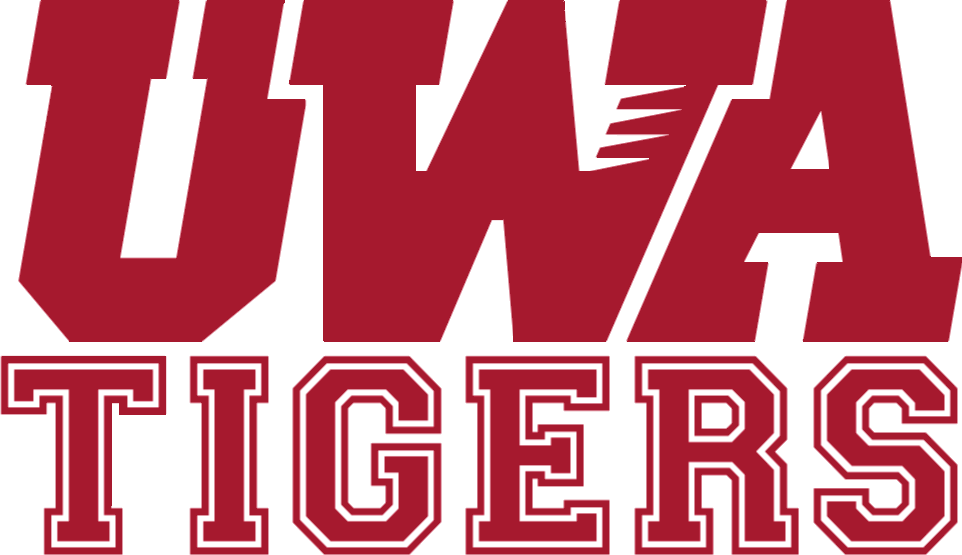
- Conference: Gulf South Conference
- Record: 2–0 (0–0 GSC)
- Head coach: Brett Gilliland (7th season)
- Offensive coordinator: Don Bailey (5th season)
- Defensive coordinator: Steve Sisa (4th season)
- Home stadium: Tiger Stadium

2020 Gulf South Conference football standings
	Conf.			Overall
Team	W		L	W		L
West Alabama		–		2	–	0
Shorter		–		2	–	2
Mississippi College		–		0	–	1
Notes: Due to COVID-19, the Gulf South Conference suspended the fall 2020 football season. The conference also announced no in-conference competition for spring 2021 play. Schools scheduled own games if desired to play. Delta State, North Greenville, Valdosta State, West Florida, and West Georgia opted out of the spring season.

The 2020 West Alabama Tigers football team represented the University of West Alabama as a member of the Gulf South Conference (GSC) during the 2020 NCAA Division II football season. They were led by seventh-year head coach Brett Gilliland. The Tigers played their home games at Tiger Stadium in Livingston, Alabama.

== Fall season delayed ==
On August 12, 2020, Gulf South Conference postponed fall competition for several sports due to the COVID-19 pandemic. A few months later in November, the conference announced that there will be no spring conference competition in football. Teams that opt-in to compete would have to schedule on their own.

At the beginning of January 2021, the Tigers program announced their first opponent of the spring competition, Savannah State for the Gulf Coast Challenge. In late February, the program announced their second opponent, Limestone.

== Schedule ==
Date	Time	Opponent	Site	Result	Attendance	Source
March 6, 2021	1:00 p.m.	Limestone*	Tiger Stadium; Livingston, AL	W 27–17	1,286	
March 13, 2021	4:00 p.m.	vs. Savannah State*	Ladd–Peebles Stadium; Mobile, AL (Gulf Coast Challenge)	W 36–28	3,499	
*Non-conference game; All times are in Central time
