= 2020 Mississippi College Choctaws football team =

American college football season

2020 Mississippi College Choctaws football
- Conference: Gulf South Conference
- Record: 0–1 ( GSC)
- Head coach: John Bland (7th season)
- Offensive coordinator: Tommy Laurendine (3rd season)
- Defensive coordinator: Tony Gilbert (2nd season)
- Home stadium: Robinson-Hale Stadium

2020 Gulf South Conference football standings
	Conf.			Overall
Team	W		L	W		L
West Alabama		–		2	–	0
Shorter		–		2	–	2
Mississippi College		–		0	–	1
Notes: Due to COVID-19, the Gulf South Conference suspended the fall 2020 football season. The conference also announced no in-conference competition for spring 2021 play. Schools scheduled own games if desired to play. Delta State, North Greenville, Valdosta State, West Florida, and West Georgia opted out of the spring season.

The 2020 Mississippi College Choctaws football team represented Mississippi College as a member of the Gulf South Conference (GSC) during the 2020 NCAA Division II football season. They were led by seventh-year head coach John Bland. The Choctaws were to have played their home games at Robinson-Hale Stadium in Clinton, Mississippi.

== Fall season delayed ==
On August 12, 2020, Gulf South Conference postponed fall competition for several sports due to the COVID-19 pandemic. A few months later in November, the conference announced that there will be no spring conference competition in football. Teams that opt-in to compete would have to schedule on their own.

Before the November announcement, the Choctaws had already scheduled their first opponent of the spring competition, Tarleton State a month before in October.

== Schedule ==
Date	Time	Opponent	Site	Result	Attendance	Source
March 6, 2021	2:00 p.m.	Tarleton State*	Memorial Stadium; Stephenville, TX	L 14–39	3,614	
*Non-conference game; All times are in Central time
