= Midwestern State Mustangs football =

- First season: 1924; 102 years ago
- Head coach: Rich Renner; 2nd season, 7–15 (.318)
- Location: Wichita Falls, Texas
- Stadium: Memorial Stadium (capacity: 14,500)
- NCAA division: Division II
- Conference: Lone Star
- Colors: Maroon and gold
- Website: MSU Mustangs

The Midwestern State Mustangs football team represents Midwestern State University, located in Wichita Falls, Texas, in NCAA Division II college football. Under previous university names and nicknames, the team was also known as the Hardin Indians, Midwestern Indians, and the Midwestern State Indians.

The Mustangs, who began playing football in 1924, compete as members of the Lone Star Conference.

== History ==
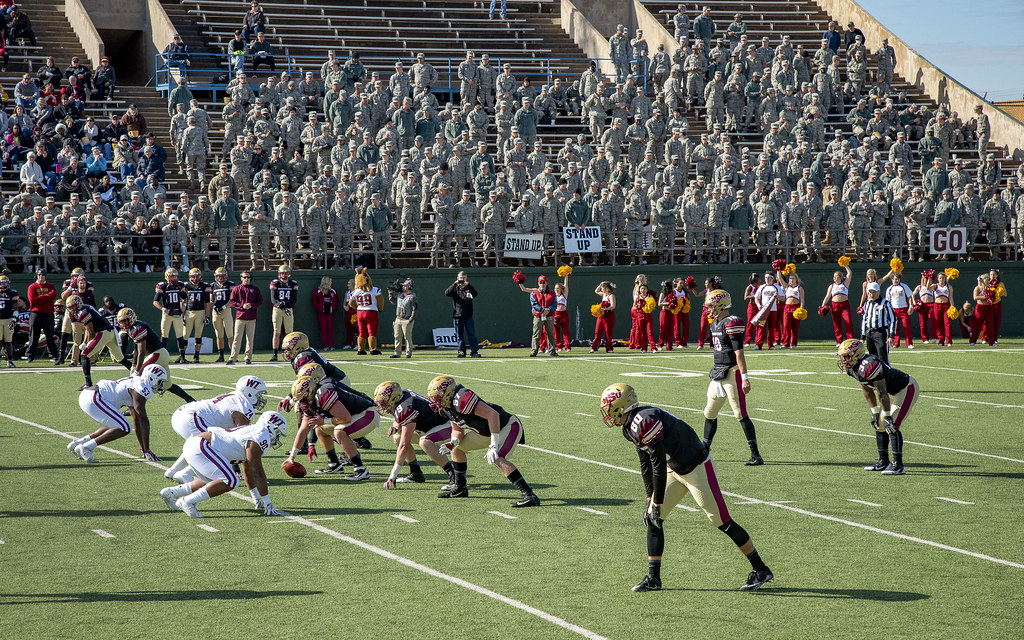
The Mustangs (right) line up on offense during a game against West Texas A&M in 2018

=== Conferences ===
- 1924–1930: Independent
- 1931–1945: Program inactive
- 1946: Independent
- 1947–1948: Texas Conference
- 1949–1956: Gulf Coast Conference
- 1957–1987: Program inactive
- 1988–1994: Texas Intercollegiate Athletic Association
- 1995–present: Lone Star Conference

== Year-by-year results ==
This list only includes the seasons Midwestern State competed as a four-year college beginning with the 1947 season.

National champions	Conference champions	Bowl game berth	Playoff berth

Year	Head Coach	Association	Division	Conference	Record							Postseason
Year	Head Coach	Association	Division	Conference	Overall			Conference				Postseason
Year	Head Coach	Association	Division	Conference	Win	Loss	Tie	Finish	Win	Loss	Tie	Postseason
Hardin Indians
1947	Thurmon Jones	NCAA	—	TC	7	4	0	T–1st	4	1	0	—
1948	Billy Stamps	NCAA	—	TC	4	5	1	T–2nd	3	1	1	—
1949	Billy Stamps	NCAA	—	GSC	10	1	0	1st	3	0	0	—
Midwestern Indians
1950	Billy Stamps	NCAA	—	GSC	4	5	1	T–1st	1	0	1	—
1951	Dixie B. White	NCAA	—	GSC	5	4	1	T–2nd	0	1	1	—
1952	Dixie B. White	NCAA	—	GSC	6	5	0	2nd	1	1	0	—
1953	Joe Saitta	NCAA	—	GSC	2	8	1	3rd	0	2	0	—
1954	Joe Saitta	NCAA	—	GSC	4	5	1	3rd	0	2	0	—
1955	Dick Todd	NCAA	—	GSC	2	8	0	4th	0	3	0	—
1956	Dick Todd	NCAA	—	GSC	3	7	0	4th	0	3	0	—
Midwestern State Indians
2002	Bill Maskill	NCAA	Division II	LSC	7	4	—	T–2nd	6	2	—	—
2003	Bill Maskill	NCAA	Division II	LSC	7	3	—	T–2nd	6	2	—	—
2004	Bill Maskill	NCAA	Division II	LSC	8	3	—	T–2nd	7	2	—	L NCAA Division II First Round
2005	Bill Maskill	NCAA	Division II	LSC	6	4	—	T–4th	5	4	—	—
Midwestern State Mustangs
2006	Bill Maskill	NCAA	Division II	LSC	10	3	—	T–2nd	7	2	—	L NCAA Division II Second Round
2007	Bill Maskill	NCAA	Division II	LSC	8	3	—	4th	6	3	—	—
2008	Bill Maskill	NCAA	Division II	LSC	6	4	—	T–7th	5	4	—	—
2009	Bill Maskill	NCAA	Division II	LSC	9	3	—	T–1st	7	2	—	L NCAA Division II First Round
2010	Bill Maskill	NCAA	Division II	LSC	8	4	—	4th	7	3	—	—
2011	Bill Maskill	NCAA	Division II	LSC	10	1	—	1st	8	0	—	L NCAA Division II Second Round
2012	Bill Maskill	NCAA	Division II	LSC	9	2	—	T–1st	7	1	—	L NCAA Division II First Round
2013	Bill Maskill	NCAA	Division II	LSC	7	3	—	4th	3	3	—	—
2014	Bill Maskill	NCAA	Division II	LSC	6	4	—	T–2nd	5	2	—	—
2015	Bill Maskill	NCAA	Division II	LSC	10	2	—	2nd	5	1	—	L NCAA Division II Second Round
2016	Bill Maskill	NCAA	Division II	LSC	8	3	—	2nd	7	2	—	—
2017	Bill Maskill	NCAA	Division II	LSC	10	1	—	1st	8	0	—	L NCAA Division II Second Round
2018	Bill Maskill	NCAA	Division II	LSC	8	2	—	3rd	6	2	—	—
2019	Bill Maskill	NCAA	Division II	LSC	5	6	—	6th	3	5	—	—
2020	Bill Maskill	NCAA	Division II	LSC	1	2	—	N/A	—	—	—	—
2021	Bill Maskill	NCAA	Division II	LSC	7	3	—	1st	6	1	—	—
2022	Bill Maskill	NCAA	Division II	LSC	6	5	—	T–3rd	5	4	—	—
2023	Bill Maskill	NCAA	Division II	LSC	4	6	—	5th	3	5	—	—
2024	Rich Renner	NCAA	Division II	LSC	4	7	—	7th	3	6	—	—
2025	Rich Renner	NCAA	Division II	LSC	3	8	—	T–7th	3	6	—	—
2026	Rich Renner	NCAA	Division II	LSC	0	0	—	TBD	0	0	—	—

== Postseason appearances ==
=== NCAA Division II ===
The Mustangs have made nine appearances in the NCAA Division II playoffs, with a combined record of 2–8.

Year	Round	Opponent	Result
2004	First Round	Colorado Mines	L, 33–52
2006	First Round; Second Round	Missouri Western; NW Missouri State	W, 28–26; L, 0–27
2009	First Round	Abilene Christian	L, 21–24
2011	Second Round	NW Missouri State	L, 31–38
2012	First Round	Indianapolis	L, 14–31
2015	Second Round	CSU Pueblo	L, 17–26
2016	First Round	Ferris State	L, 34–65
2017	First Round; Second Round	Sioux Falls; Minnesota State	W, 24–20; L, 21–63
2026	First Round	CSU Pueblo	TBP

=== NAIA ===
Midwestern State made one appearance in the NAIA playoffs, with a record of 1–1.

Year	Round	Opponent	Result
1991	First Round; Quarterfinals	Bethany (KS); Peru State	W, 29–0; L, 24–28

== Former players ==
- Marqui Christian
- Amini Silatolu
