= Blue Wahoos Stadium =

Home of the Blue Wahoos

- Fetterman Field
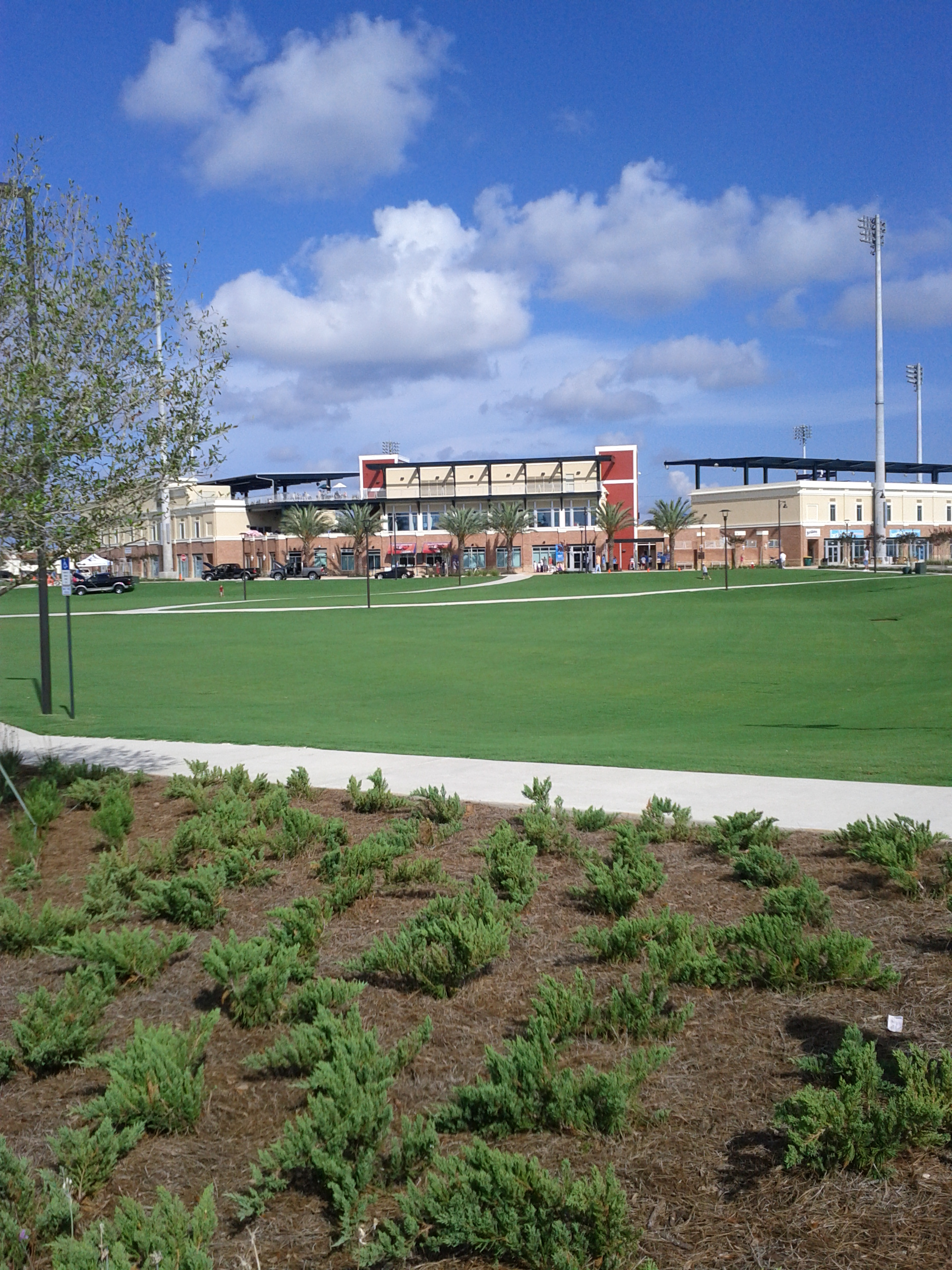
- 2012 photo of the stadium

- Location within Florida Location within the United States
- Interactive map of Blue Wahoos Stadium
- Address: 351 West Cedar Street; Pensacola, FL 32502
- Coordinates: 30°24′15.6″N 87°13′05.6″W
- Owner: Community Maritime Park Associates
- Operator: Community Maritime Park Associates
- Capacity: 5,038
- Surface: Artificial Turf
- Field size: Left Field: 342 ft (104 m); Center Field: 400 ft (120 m); Right Field: 335 ft (102 m)

Construction
- Groundbreaking: September 17, 2009
- Opened: April 5, 2012
- Cost: $23,845,045.23 ($33.4 million in 2025 dollars)
- Architects: Populous; Bullock Tice Associates; SMB Architecture
- Project manager: Hatch Mott MacDonald/Morette
- Structural engineers: Joe DeReuil Associates, LLC.
- Services engineer: Schmidt Consulting Engineers
- General contractor: Magi Construction JV
- Main contractor: Southeastern Construction Inc.

Tenants
- Pensacola Blue Wahoos (SL) 2012–present West Florida Argonauts (NCAA) 2016–2021

Blue Wahoos Stadium, located in the Community Maritime Park, is a multi-use park in Pensacola, Florida, that includes a stadium, commercial buildings, a waterfront public park and amphitheater. The mixed use stadium holds 5,038 people and can be used for a number of events year-round, including baseball, soccer, football, festivals, graduations, and similar events. The multi-use stadium was originally designed to be the home field of the Pensacola Pelicans; it hosts the Miami Marlins Double-A affiliate, the Pensacola Blue Wahoos of the Southern League. The stadium is situated facing the Pensacola Bay. The playing surface is titled "Admiral Jack Fetterman Field", honoring the U.S. Navy three-star vice admiral, who retired in Pensacola and became a prominent civic leader. Along with Vince Whibbs Sr., the two were influential in getting the Community Maritime Park project approved by voters.

== History ==
On April 28, 2009, the Pensacola City Council gave final approval for the ballpark to be built.

The entire project cost $54 million and was completed in time for the Blue Wahoos' inaugural home opener on April 5, 2012. Building the ballpark cost $23,845,045.23.

== Stadium description ==
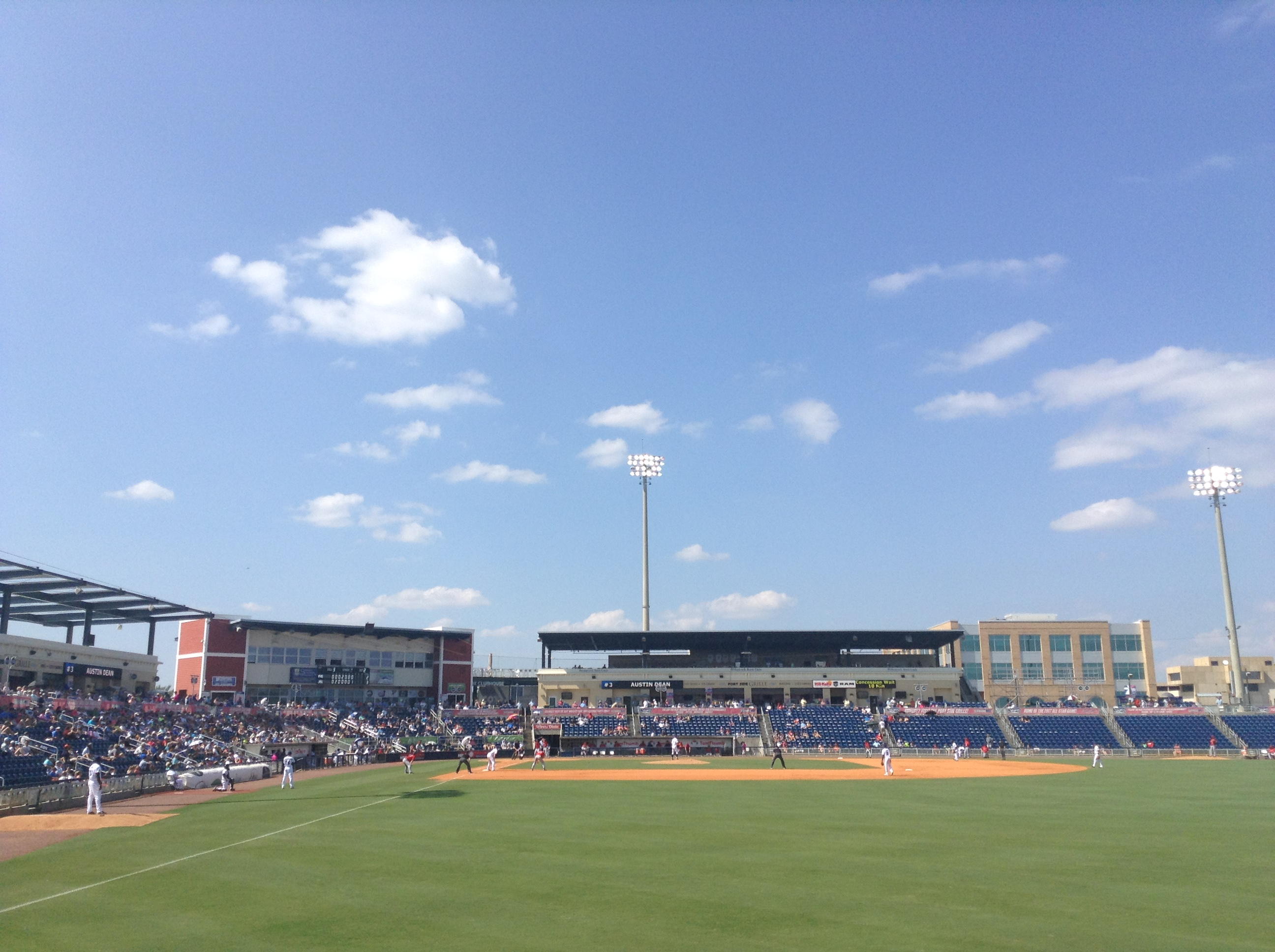
Blue Wahoos Stadium

Blue Wahoos Stadium is a 117,000 square feet (10,900 m^{2}), 5,038 seat multi-use venue. Construction includes precast concrete bowl seating, steel framed elevated slabs, post-tensioned slabs-on-grade, and an auger cast pile foundation with concrete grade beams and pile caps. This project was custom designed to meet the needs for the use by a minor league baseball team as well as for accommodating other sporting and festival type events. The structure and slab-on-grade was pile supported due to poor soil conditions and concern over scour from hurricanes.

During steel fabrication and foundation construction, a Double-A baseball team was acquired. This acquisition required enhancements to the stadium. This was a challenge for the design team who worked diligently to adjust the structure while using newly constructed elements within the enhancements, while providing subcontractors information needed to keep construction moving forward without incurring additional mobilization fees.

== Randall K. and Martha A. Hunter Amphitheater description ==
The amphitheater has architecturally exposed steel trusses and frames supporting curved steel roof purlins with a heavy timber, tongue-and-groove roof deck. The steel trusses and frames are designed and shaped to resemble the fronds of a palm tree. The steel structure is supported on concrete piers that are supported on a large concrete pile cap that rests on auger-cast-in-place piles. The concrete piers also support the main stage floor. The stage floor is a flat plate, 8 inches (200 mm) thick post-tensioned concrete slab.

== UWF Football ==
The stadium hosted the Argonauts football team of the University of West Florida (UWF) for six seasons from 2016 to 2021. On November 13, 2021, the Argonauts won a share of their first-ever Gulf South Conference football title at the stadium in a win over Valdosta State. On November 20, 2021, UWF hosted their first-ever home NCAA Division II playoff game at the venue.
