= Rich Renner =

American football coach (born c. 1974)

Current position
- Title: Head coach
- Team: Midwestern State
- Conference: LSC
- Record: 16–18

Biographical details
- Born: c. 1974 (age 51–52); Cincinnati, Ohio, U.S.

Playing career
- 1993–1996: Louisville
- Position: Linebacker

Coaching career (HC unless noted)
- 1997–1998: Louisville (GA)
- 1999: Austin Peay (GA)
- 2000–2005: West Texas A&M (LB/DL)
- 2006–2007: Midwestern State (DL)
- 2008–2023: Midwestern State (DC)
- 2024–present: Midwestern State

Head coaching record
- Overall: 16–18

Accomplishments and honors

Awards
- LSC Co-Coach of the Year (2026)

Rich L. Renner (born c. 1974) is an American college football coach. He is the head football coach for Midwestern State University, a position he has held since 2024. He also coached for Louisville, Austin Peay, and West Texas A&M before becoming a long-time assistant for Midwestern State from 2006 to 2023. He played college football for Louisville as a linebacker.

== Head coaching record ==
Year	Team	Overall	Conference	Standing	Bowl/playoffs
Midwestern State Mustangs (Lone Star Conference) (2024–present)
2024	Midwestern State	4–7	3–6	7th	
2025	Midwestern State	3–8	3–6	T–7th	
2026	Midwestern State	9–3	8–1	2nd	L NCAA Division II First Round
Midwestern State:		16–18	14–13		
Total:		16–18			
