= Russ Martin (American football) =

American football player and coach (born 1956)

Biographical details
- Born: February 1, 1956 (age 70)

Playing career
- 1974–1977: Chadron State
- Position: Linebacker

Coaching career (HC unless noted)
- 1979–1981: Minatare HS (NE)
- 1982–1984: Scottsbluff HS (NE) (assistant)
- 1985: Baylor (DE)
- 1986–1987: Nebraska–Kearney (LB)
- 1988–1990: Kansas Wesleyan (DC)
- 1991–1995: Bethany (KS) (OC)
- 1996–1999: Black Hills State
- 2000–2003: Southeast Missouri State (OC)
- 2004–2011: Nebraska–Kearney (OC/QB)
- 2012–2019: Colorado Mesa
- 2020–2022: West Texas A&M (OC)

Head coaching record
- Overall: 67–61
- Tournaments: 0–1 (NCAA D-II playoffs)

Accomplishments and honors

Championships
- 3 RMAC (2015–2017)

Russ Martin (born February 1, 1956) is an American football coach and former player. Martin served as the head football coach at Black Hills State University in Spearfish, South Dakota from 1996 to 1999 and Colorado Mesa University in Grand Junction, Colorado from 2012 to 2019.

== Head coaching record ==
=== College ===
Year	Team	Overall	Conference	Standing	Bowl/playoffs
Black Hills State Yellow Jackets (South Dakota-Iowa Intercollegiate Conference) (1996–1999)
1996	Black Hills State	4–6	3–3	T–3rd	
1997	Black Hills State	3–6	2–4	5th	
1998	Black Hills State	1–9	1–4	5th	
1999	Black Hills State	4–6	2–3	4th	
Black Hills State:		12–27	8–14		
Colorado Mesa Mavericks (Rocky Mountain Athletic Conference) (2012–2019)
2012	Colorado Mesa	4–7	4–5	T–5th	
2013	Colorado Mesa	5–6	4–5	T–5th	
2014	Colorado Mesa	6–5	5–4	4th	
2015	Colorado Mesa	9–2	8–1	1st	
2016	Colorado Mesa	9–3	8–2	T–1st	L NCAA Division II First Round
2017	Colorado Mesa	9–2	9–1	T–1st	
2018	Colorado Mesa	7–4	6–4	5th	
2019	Colorado Mesa	6–5	6–4	4th	
Colorado Mesa:		55–34	50–26		
Total:		67–61			
National championship Conference title Conference division title or championship game berth
