= University of Fort Lauderdale =

Private Christian university in Lauderhill, Florida, U.S.

Coordinates: 26.1470°N 80.2054°W

- Motto: "The Place Where Change Happens" "Reaching and Restoring the World for Christ"
- Type: Private
- Established: 1995; 31 years ago
- Religious affiliation: Christian (non-denominational)
- Academic affiliations: TRACS
- Chancellor: Henry B. Fernandez
- Provost: Kiara Carter
- Students: 231
- Location: Lauderhill, Florida, U.S.
- Campus: 33,006 square feet
- Colors: Maroon & gold
- Nickname: Eagles
- Sporting affiliations: NCCAA Div. I – South
- Website: www.uftl.edu

The University of Fort Lauderdale (UFTL) is a private Christian university in Lauderhill, Florida, United States. Founded in 1995, the school offers associate, bachelor's, master's, and doctoral degrees and has a mission statement of being a "premier Christian institution of higher learning empowering future leaders through higher educational degrees rooted in Biblical principles". UFTL co-founder Henry B. Fernandez leads the school as chancellor and CEO.

== History ==
The University of Fort Lauderdale was founded as Plantation Christian University in 1995, by Henry and Carol Fernandez, senior pastors of The Faith Center. Henry Fernandez has led the university as its chancellor and CEO since its founding; he is the recipient of an honorary Doctor of Divinity degree from St. Thomas University, and is styled "Dr. Henry Fernandez" by UFTL. A "president" is also mentioned in the school's 2021–22 catalog, and the school's athletics website lists Fernandez as both the chancellor and the president.

UFTL Chancellors
Chancellor	Term
Henry B. Fernandez, D.Div. (hon.)	1995–present

=== Other leadership and administration ===
The school lists five other administrators apart from Fernandez. Dawn Piper is the university's chief academic officer, Dr. Brian Hankerson is the chief financial officer, Gregory Sidberry is the university librarian, Lenice Barnett is the registrar, and Winsome Brown is the bursar. The school has both a faculty and student senate; the faculty senate president is Dr. Veronica Carter.

== Academics ==
The university contains three colleges - a College of Business Leadership, a College of Religious Studies, and a College of Liberal Studies. The application fee is US$35 and completion of an entrance exam is accepted in lieu of submission of SAT or ACT scores.

=== College of Business Leadership ===
The College of Business Leadership offers students the opportunity to "learn and apply real-world market concepts to help ensure their success in the 21st century marketplace." The college offers an Associate of Arts in business administration, a Bachelor of Arts in business administration, with eight possible concentrations (accounting, business administration, construction management, criminal justice, healthcare administration, human resource management, management, and marketing), and a Master of Business Administration degree.

=== College of Religious Studies ===
The College of Religious Studies offers coursework that allows students to pursue ministry and pastorship. The college offers four levels of degree: an Associate of Science in ministry, a Bachelor of Science in ministry, with four possible concentrations (Christian counseling, ministry, theology, and Christian education), a Master of Divinity or Master of Science in pastoral counseling, and a Doctorate of Ministry.

=== College of Liberal Studies ===
The College of Liberal Studies, also referred to as the College of Liberal Arts by the school's website, offers "the development of broad knowledge and abilities...informed by the Christian tradition." The college offers only one degree, a Bachelor of Arts in liberal studies, with seven possible concentrations – broadcasting, English, history, information technology, psychology, religion, and theatrical production.

The university is accredited by the Transnational Association of Christian Colleges and Schools.

== Campus ==
UFTL's campus is located in Lauderhill, Florida, and is 33,006 square feet in size. Among the university's facilities is the Henry B. Fernandez Library, which contains over 5,500 books and is a member of the Library Information Resource Network.

=== Campus life ===
The university has an enrollment of 225 students. Students are required to attend chapel once per month, as it is referred to by the school as "an integral and indispensable part of the learning experience"; the course code MIN 180 is used for chapel, which does not provide students with credits.

== Athletics ==
Men's sports	Women's sports
Baseball	Cheerleading
Basketball	Flag Football
Football	Track and Field
Soccer	Basketball
Track and Field

The Fort Lauderdale athletic teams are called the Eagles. The university is a member of the National Christian College Athletic Association (NCCAA), primarily competing as an independent in the South Region of the Division I level since the 2021–22 academic year.

Fort Lauderdale currently competes in eight intercollegiate athletic teams: Men's sports include baseball, basketball, football, soccer and track & field; while women's sports include basketball, cheerleading, flag football and track & field.

=== History ===
The athletics program is a relatively recent addition to the college, with the announcement of its establishment published on Twitter on May 11, 2020. UFTL's acceptance into the NCCAA was announced on March 25, 2021.
