= 2020–21 NCAA Division II football season =

American college football season

2020 NCAA Division II football season
- Total No. of teams: 67
- Regular season: September 26, 2020 – April 25, 2021
- Playoffs: Not held
- Harlon Hill Trophy: Not awarded

The 2020–21 NCAA Division II football season was the component of the 2020 college football season organized by the NCAA at the Division II level in the United States. Due to the COVID-19 pandemic, only a few games were played during the traditional fall season. For other teams that chose to play during the 2020–21 school year, the regular season began on February 27, 2021, and culminated on April 25.

The season concluded with the end of the regular season, as the playoffs and championship game were not held due to the pandemic.

== D-II team wins over FCS teams ==
- November 7, 2020: Angelo State 34, Abilene Christian 21
- April 1, 2021: East Central 21, Tarleton State 14

== Conference changes and new programs ==
=== Membership changes ===
School	Former conference	New conference
Barton Bulldogs	Returning program, last competed 1950	Independent
Dixie State Trailblazers	RMAC	WAC (FCS)
Erskine Flying Fleet	Returning program, last competed 1951	Independent
Florida Tech Panthers	Gulf South	Dropped program
Minnesota Crookston Golden Eagles	Northern Sun	Dropped program
UNC Pembroke Braves	Independent	Mountain East
St. Cloud State Huskies	Northern Sun	Dropped program
Tarleton Texans	Lone Star	WAC (FCS)
Urbana Blue Knights	Mountain East	School closed

== Conference standings ==
Only four conferences (GLVC, G-MAC, Mountain East and SAC) and two independents (Barton and Erskine) decided to play the season. All of them played a spring schedule. GAC, GLIAC, GNAC, Gulf South, Lone Star, MIAA, PSAC, RMAC and SIAC cancelled their football season, but some of their teams decided to play. Standings do not count games designated as exhibitions/scrimmages, only games in a school's official statistics.

=== Super Region 1 ===
2020 Great Midwest Athletic Conference football standings
	Conf.			Overall
Team	W		L	W		L
Tiffin $	5	–	0	6	–	0
Findlay	4	–	2	4	–	2
Ohio Dominican	4	–	2	4	–	2
Hillsdale	2	–	2	2	–	2
Kentucky Wesleyan	1	–	4	1	–	4
Walsh	1	–	4	1	–	4
Lake Erie	0	–	3	0	–	3
$ – Conference champion

2020 Mountain East Conference football standings
	Conf.			Overall
Team	W		L	W		L
North
Notre Dame (OH) y$	4	–	0	5	–	0
Frostburg State #	3	–	1	3	–	1
Wheeling	2	–	2	2	–	2
West Liberty	2	–	2	2	–	2
Alderson Broaddus	0	–	4	0	–	4
South
Charleston (WV) y	3	–	0	3	–	1
Concord	1	–	0	1	–	0
UNC Pembroke	2	–	1	2	–	1
West Virginia State	2	–	2	2	–	2
West Virginia Wesleyan	0	–	2	0	–	2
Glenville State	0	–	4	0	–	4
Championship: Notre Dame (OH) 51, Charleston (WV) 34
$ – Conference champion; y – Championship game participant; Notes: Fairmont State opted out of the spring season. # – Provisional NCAA Division II member

2020 Pennsylvania State Athletic Conference football standings
	Conf.			Overall
Team	W		L	W		L
Shepherd		–		1	–	0
Gannon		–		1	–	3
Mercyhurst		–		0	–	2
Notes: Due to COVID-19, the Pennsylvania State Athletic Conference suspended the fall 2020 football season. The conference also announced no in-conference competition for spring 2021 play. Schools scheduled own games if desired to play. Bloomsburg, California (PA), Clarion, East Stroudsburg, Edinboro, IUP, Kutztown, Lock Haven, Millersville, Seton Hill, Shippensburg, Slippery Rock and West Chester opted out of the spring season.

=== Super Region 2 ===
2020 Gulf South Conference football standings
	Conf.			Overall
Team	W		L	W		L
West Alabama		–		2	–	0
Shorter		–		2	–	2
Mississippi College		–		0	–	1
Notes: Due to COVID-19, the Gulf South Conference suspended the fall 2020 football season. The conference also announced no in-conference competition for spring 2021 play. Schools scheduled own games if desired to play. Delta State, North Greenville, Valdosta State, West Florida, and West Georgia opted out of the spring season.

2020 South Atlantic Conference football standings
	Conf.			Overall
Team	W		L	W		L
Mountain
Tusculum y$	2	–	0	4	–	1
Carson–Newman	1	–	0	1	–	0
Mars Hill	1	–	2	1	–	2
Virginia–Wise	1	–	2	1	–	2
Limestone	1	–	2	1	–	3
Piedmont
Lenoir–Rhyne y	3	–	0	3	–	1
Newberry	3	–	1	5	–	1
Wingate	2	–	2	2	–	2
Catawba	0	–	2	0	–	2
Championship: Tusculum 28, Lenoir–Rhyne 23
$ – Conference champion; y – Championship game participant; Notes: Barton was not a member of SAC at the time but a scheduling partner for the conference; games against Barton counted toward conference records.

2020 Southern Intercollegiate Athletic Conference football standings
	Conf.			Overall
Team	W		L	W		L
Fort Valley State		–		2	–	0
Savannah State		–		1	–	1
Notes: Due to COVID-19, the Southern Intercollegiate Athletic Conference suspended the fall 2020 football season. The conference also announced no in-conference competition for spring 2021 play. Schools scheduled own games if desired to play. Albany State, Benedict, Central State (OH), Clark Atlanta, Kentucky State, Lane, Miles, Morehouse and Tuskegee opted out of the spring season.

2020 NCAA Division II independents football records
	Conf.			Overall
Team	W		L	W		L
Erskine		–		1	–	5
Barton		–		0	–	4

=== Super Region 3 ===
2020 Great American Conference football standings
	Conf.			Overall
Team	W		L	W		L
East Central		–		2	–	0
Southern Nazarene		–		0	–	3
Notes: Due to COVID-19, the Great American Conference suspended the fall 2020 football season. The conference also announced no in-conference competition for spring 2021 play. Schools scheduled own games if desired to play. Arkansas Tech, Arkansas–Monticello, Harding, Henderson State, NW Oklahoma State, Oklahoma Baptist, Ouachita Baptist, SE Oklahoma State, Southern Arkansas and SW Oklahoma State opted out of the spring season. Southern Nazarene counted all their games as exhibition, while East Central and a few others teams that played Southern Nazarene did not, and counted their game in statistical records.

2020 Great Lakes Intercollegiate Athletic Conference football standings
	Conf.			Overall
Team	W		L	W		L
Davenport		–		2	–	0
Notes: Due to COVID-19, the Great Lakes Intercollegiate Athletic Conference suspended the fall 2020 football season. The conference also announced no in-conference competition for spring 2021 play. Schools scheduled own games if desired to play. Ashland, Ferris State, Grand Valley State, Michigan Tech, Northern Michigan, Northwood, Saginaw Valley State and Wayne State (MI) opted out of the spring season.

2020 Great Lakes Valley Conference football standings
	Conf.			Overall
Team	W		L	W		L
East
Indianapolis y$	2	–	0	3	–	0
McKendree	1	–	1	1	–	1
Quincy	0	–	2	0	–	2
Lindenwood	0	–	0	0	–	0
West
Truman State y	3	–	0	3	–	1
Missouri S&T	2	–	1	2	–	1
Southwest Baptist	1	–	2	1	–	2
William Jewell	0	–	3	0	–	3
Championship: Indianapolis 46, Truman State 29
$ – Conference champion; y – Championship game participant; Note: Season played in spring 2021. Lindenwood opted not to participate.

2020 Mid-America Intercollegiate Athletics Association football standings
	Conf.			Overall
Team	W		L	W		L
Nebraska–Kearney		–		2	–	0
Missouri Southern		–		1	–	0
Pittsburg State		–		2	–	2
Northeastern State		–		0	–	1
Missouri Western		–		0	–	2
Lincoln (MO)		–		0	–	2
Notes: Due to COVID-19, the Mid-America Intercollegiate Athletics Association suspended the fall 2020 football season. The conference also announced no in-conference competition for spring 2021 play, schools scheduled own games if desired to play. Nebraska–Kearney, Pittsburg State and Missouri Western played only in the fall, while Missouri Southern, Northeastern State and Lincoln (MO) played only in the spring. Central Missouri, Central Oklahoma, Emporia State, Fort Hays State, NW Missouri State and Washburn opted out of the season.; Rankings from AP Poll

=== Super Region 4 ===
2020 Great Northwest Athletic Conference football standings
	Conf.			Overall
Team	W		L	W		L
Central Washington		–		0	–	1
Notes: Due to COVID-19, the Great Northwest Athletic Conference suspended the fall 2020 football season. The conference also announced no in-conference competition for spring 2021 play. Schools scheduled own games if desired to play. Simon Fraser and Western Oregon opted out of the spring season. Azusa Pacific dropped football in late-December.

2020 Lone Star Conference football standings
	Conf.			Overall
Team	W		L	W		L
UT Permian Basin		–		5	–	0
West Texas A&M		–		3	–	3
Angelo State		–		2	–	2
Midwestern State		–		1	–	2
Western New Mexico		–		0	–	1
Texas A&M–Kingsville		–		0	–	2
Notes: Due to COVID-19, the Lone South Conference suspended the fall 2020 football season. The conference also announced no in-conference competition for spring 2021 play. Schools scheduled own games if desired to play either in the fall or spring. Eastern New Mexico and Texas A&M–Commerce opted out of the season.

2020 Rocky Mountain Athletic Conference football standings
	Conf.			Overall
Team	W		L	W		L
Chadron State		–		2	–	1
Colorado Mesa		–		2	–	1
South Dakota Mines		–		2	–	2
New Mexico Highlands		–		1	–	0
Western Colorado		–		0	–	1
Black Hills State		–		0	–	2
Fort Lewis		–		0	–	2
Notes: Due to COVID-19, the Rocky Mountain Athletic Conference suspended the football season. The conference also announced no in-conference competition for spring 2021 play. Schools scheduled own games if desired to play. Chadron State, Colorado Mesa, South Dakota Mines, Western Colorado and Black Hills State played only in the fall, while New Mexico Highlands and Fort Lewis played only in the spring. Adams State, Colorado Mines and CSU Pueblo opted out of the season.

=== Conferences that did not play ===
The following conferences did not hold a football season in fall 2020 or spring 2021, and none of their members opted to play independently.

- Central Intercollegiate Athletic Association – announced on October 2, 2020, that the football season would not be played.
- Northeast-10 Conference – announced on January 13, 2021, that postponed fall sports would not be rescheduled for the spring.
- Northern Sun Intercollegiate Conference – did not have a football season.

== See also ==
- 2020 NCAA Division I FBS football season
- 2020–21 NCAA Division I FCS football season
- 2020–21 NCAA Division III football season
- 2020 NAIA football season
