= 2018 Midwestern State Mustangs football team =

American college football season

2018 Midwestern State Mustangs football
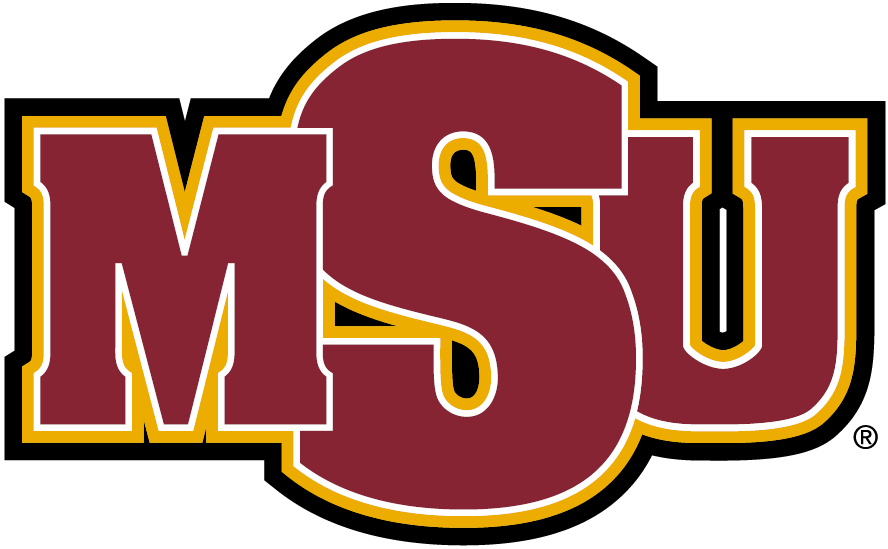
- Conference: Lone Star Conference

Ranking
- AFCA: No. 25
- Record: 8–2 (6–2 LSC)
- Head coach: Bill Maskill (17th season)
- Offensive coordinator: Adam Austin (6th season)
- Offensive scheme: Pro spread
- Defensive coordinator: Rich Renner (11th season)
- Base defense: 4–3
- Home stadium: Memorial Stadium

2018 Lone Star Conference football standings
| | Conf. | | | Overall |
| Team | W | | L | W | | L |
|---|---|---|---|---|---|---|
| No. 5 Tarleton State $^ | 8 | – | 0 | 12 | – | 1 |
| No. 9 Texas A&M–Commerce ^ | 7 | – | 1 | 10 | – | 3 |
| No. 25 Midwestern State | 6 | – | 2 | 8 | – | 2 |
| Angelo State # | 4 | – | 4 | 6 | – | 6 |
| West Texas A&M | 4 | – | 4 | 6 | – | 5 |
| Eastern New Mexico | 4 | – | 4 | 5 | – | 6 |
| Texas A&M–Kingsville | 2 | – | 6 | 4 | – | 7 |
| UT Permian Basin | 1 | – | 7 | 2 | – | 9 |
| Western New Mexico | 0 | – | 8 | 0 | – | 10 |
$ – Conference champion; ^ – NCAA Division II playoff participant; # – C.H.A.M.P.S. Heart of Texas Bowl participant; Rankings from AFCA poll

The 2018 Midwestern State Mustangs football team represented Midwestern State University in the 2018 NCAA Division II football season. They were led by head coach Bill Maskill, who is in his 17th season at Midwestern State. The Mustangs played their home games at Memorial Stadium and were members of the Lone Star Conference.

== Schedule ==
Midwestern State announced its 2018 football schedule on April 13, 2018. The schedule consisted of six home and four away games in the regular season. The Mustangs hosted LSC foes Angelo State, Texas A&M–Commerce, West Texas A&M, and Tarleton State and traveled to UT Permian Basin, Eastern New Mexico, Texas A&M–Kingsville, and Western New Mexico.

The Mustangs hosted two non-conference games against Humboldt State from the Great Northwest Athletic Conference and West Florida from the Gulf South Conference, who were the national runners-up in 2017.

| Date | Time | Opponent | Rank | Site | Result | Attendance |
|---|---|---|---|---|---|---|
| September 1 | 7:00 p.m | Humboldt State* | No. 11 | Memorial Stadium; Wichita Falls, TX | W 55–12 | 7,927 |
| September 8 | 7:00 p.m. | No. 2 West Florida* | No. 10 | Memorial Stadium; Wichita Falls, TX | W 38–17 | 8,258 |
| September 15 | 6:00 p.m. | at UT Permian Basin | No. 7 | Ratliff Stadium; Odessa, TX | W 43–21 | 3,579 |
| September 22 | 7:00 p.m. | Angelo State | No. 7 | Memorial Stadium; Wichita Falls, TX | W 57–36 | 8,127 |
| September 29 | 8:00 p.m. | at Eastern New Mexico | No. 5 | Greyhound Stadium; Portales, NM | W 31–23 | 1,400 |
| October 6 | 7:00 p.m. | vs. No. 9 Texas A&M–Commerce | No. 4 | Apogee Stadium; Denton, TX | L 19–20 | 8,122 |
| October 13 | 7:00 p.m. | Texas A&M–Kingsville | No. 12 | Javelina Stadium; Kingsville, TX | W 69–14 | 2,088 |
| October 27 | 7:00 p.m. | No. 8 Tarleton State^{†} | No. 10 | Memorial Stadium; Wichita Falls, TX | L 34–35 ^{OT} | 9,247 |
| November 3 | 1:00 p.m. | at Western New Mexico | No. 18 | Altamirano Stadium; Silver City, NM | W 48–35 | 450 |
| November 10 | 1:00 p.m. | West Texas A&M | No. 16 | Memorial Stadium; Wichita Falls, TX | W 24–23 ^{OT} | 7,862 |
*Non-conference game; ^{†}Homecoming; Rankings from AFCA Poll released prior to the game
