= 2018 Texas A&M–Kingsville Javelinas football team =

American college football season

2018 Texas A&M–Kingsville Javelinas football
- Conference: Lone Star Conference
- Record: 4–7 (2–6 LSC)
- Head coach: Daren Wilkinson (4th season)
- Defensive coordinator: Haskel Buff (1st season)
- Captains: Koy Detmer Jr.; Brandon Jones; Devonte Williams
- Home stadium: Javelina Stadium

2018 Lone Star Conference football standings
	Conf.			Overall
Team	W		L	W		L
No. 5 Tarleton State $^	8	–	0	12	–	1
No. 9 Texas A&M–Commerce ^	7	–	1	10	–	3
No. 25 Midwestern State	6	–	2	8	–	2
Angelo State #	4	–	4	6	–	6
West Texas A&M	4	–	4	6	–	5
Eastern New Mexico	4	–	4	5	–	6
Texas A&M–Kingsville	2	–	6	4	–	7
UT Permian Basin	1	–	7	2	–	9
Western New Mexico	0	–	8	0	–	10
$ – Conference champion; ^ – NCAA Division II playoff participant; # – C.H.A.M.P.S. Heart of Texas Bowl participant; Rankings from AFCA poll

The 2018 Texas A&M–Kingsville Javelinas football team represented Texas A&M University–Kingsville in the 2018 NCAA Division II football season. They were led by fourth-year head coach Daren Wilkinson. The Javelinas played their home games at Javelina Stadium and were members of the Lone Star Conference.

== Schedule ==
Texas A&M–Kingsville announced its 2018 football schedule on January 9, 2018 with an update on April 30, 2018 and a final release on June 5, 2018. The schedule consisted of eleven games, including seven home and four away games in the regular season. The Javelinas hosted LSC foes Eastern New Mexico, Midwestern State, Western New Mexico, and UT Permian Basin and traveled to Texas A&M–Commerce, Angelo State, Tarleton State, and West Texas A&M.

The Javelinas hosted three non-conference games against NAIA Texas Wesleyan from the Sooner Athletic Conference, Western Oregon from the Great Northwest Athletic Conference (GNAC) and New Mexico Highlands from the Rocky Mountain Athletic Conference (RMAC).

Date	Time	Opponent	Site	Result	Attendance
August 30	7:00 p.m	at No. 1 Texas A&M–Commerce	Memorial Stadium; Commerce, TX	L 36–37 ^{2OT}	7,141
September 8	7:00 p.m	Texas Wesleyan*	Javelina Stadium; Kingsville, TX	W 52–10	10,497
September 15	6:00 p.m	at Angelo State	LeGrand Sports Complex; San Angelo, TX	L 14–30	1,537
September 22	7:00 p.m	Eastern New Mexico	Javelina Stadium; Kingsville, TX	L 14–31	4,664
September 29	7:00 p.m	New Mexico Highlands*	Javelina Stadium; Kingsville, TX	W 33–30	2,842
October 6	7:00 p.m	Western Oregon*	Javelina Stadium; Kingsville, TX	L 7–13	2,914
October 13	7:00 p.m	No. 12 Midwestern State	Javelina Stadium; Kingsville, TX	L 14–69	2,088
October 20	6:00 p.m	at No. 9 Tarleton State	Memorial Stadium; Stephenville, TX	L 21–59	6,534
October 27	7:00 p.m	Western New Mexico^{†}	Javelina Stadium; Kingsville, TX	W 37–34	6,073
November 3	6:00 p.m	at West Texas A&M	Happy State Bank Stadium; Canyon, TX	L 31–35	6,137
November 10	7:00 p.m	UT Permian Basin	Javelina Stadium; Kingsville, TX	W 24–21	3,247
*Non-conference game; ^{†}Homecoming; Rankings from American Football Coaches Association Poll released prior to the game
