= Sam McElroy =

American football coach

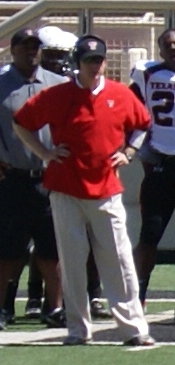
- McElroy during the 2011 Texas Tech Red Raiders Spring Game

Biographical details
- Born: c. 1963 (age 62–63); Corsicana, Texas, U.S.

Coaching career (HC unless noted)
- 1983–1985: Southwest Texas State (assistant)
- 1986–1988: Corsicana HS (TX) (assistant)
- 1989–1990: Baylor (GA)
- 1991: Navarro (DB)
- 1992: Alto HS (TX)
- 1993–1999: Sam Houston State (DB)
- 2000–2002: Tarleton State (DC)
- 2003–2004: North Texas (DB)
- 2005–2009: Tarleton State
- 2010–2011: Texas Tech (DL)

Head coaching record
- Overall: 40–15
- Tournaments: 1–1 (NCAA D-II playoffs)

Accomplishments and honors

Championships
- 1 LSC (2009); 2 LSC South Division (2006, 2009)

Sam McElroy (born c. 1963) is an American football coach. He served as head football coach at Tarleton State University from 2005 to 2009, compiling a record of 40–15.

McElroy is a 1985 graduate of Southwest Texas State University (now Texas State University), where he did not play varsity football but served as student assistant to head coach John O'Hara. Soon after graduation he became assistant coach at Corsicana High School. In 1989, he was hired by Grant Teaff to serve as graduate assistant at Baylor University. He later had short stints at Navarro College and at Alto High School, where he was named 1992 District 22-AA Coach of the Year after winning the district title and earning a state playoff berth.

In 1993, McElroy was hired by Ron Randleman to serve as defensive backs coach at Sam Houston State University. During his seven years on the staff at Sam Houston State, McElroy coached eight players who earned All-Southland Conference honors. In 2000, he left SHSU to join Todd Whitten's coaching staff at Tarleton State as defensive coordinator. While at Tarleton, McElroy guided a defense that improved each year under his direction. His last season with the Texans, his defense allowed opponents just 271 yards of offense and 17.1 points per game to rank second in the Lone Star Conference.

After the 2002 season, McElroy left Tarleton State to join Darrell Dickey's coaching staff at the University of North Texas. In 2005, McElroy returned to Tarleton State, succeeding Todd Whitten as Texans head coach.

On February 3, 2010, McElroy was hired by Texas Tech head coach Tommy Tuberville to coach the defensive line. On December 9, 2011, he was fired from this position.

== Head coaching record ==
=== College ===
Year	Team	Overall	Conference	Standing	Bowl/playoffs	Coaches^{#}
Tarleton State Texans (Lone Star Conference) (2005–2009)
2005	Tarleton State	7–3	6–3 / 3–3	4th / T–3rd (South)		
2006	Tarleton State	6–4	6–3 / 5–1	4th / T–1st (South)		
2007	Tarleton State	9–2	7–2 / 4–2	3rd / 3rd (South)		
2008	Tarleton State	8–3	6–3 / 3–3	T–3rd / T–3rd (South)		
2009	Tarleton State	10–3	7–2 / 4–2	T–1st / T–1st (South)	L NCAA Division Second Round	10
Tarleton State:		40–15	32–13			
Total:		40–15				
National championship Conference title Conference division title or championship game berth
