= Daren Wilkinson =

American football player and coach (born 1972)

Biographical details
- Born: February 11, 1972 (age 54)

Playing career
- 1993–1994: Ricks College
- 1995–1996: Colorado State
- Position: Quarterback

Coaching career (HC unless noted)
- 1997–1998: Colorado State (GA)
- 1999: Eastern Arizona College (QB)
- 2000: Eastern Arizona College (OC)
- 2001–2003: Fayetteville State (WR)
- 2004–2007: South Dakota State (OC/QB)
- 2008–2012: Colorado State (QB)
- 2013–2014: CSU Pueblo (OC/QB)
- 2015–2019: Texas A&M–Kingsville
- 2020–2022: CSU Pueblo (OC/QB)

Head coaching record
- Overall: 21–35
- Bowls: 1–0

Daren Wilkinson (born February 11, 1972) is an American college football coach and former player. He served as the head football coach at Texas A&M University–Kingsville from 2015 to 2019. Wilkinson played college football at Colorado State University where he was a starting quarterback.

== Head coaching record ==
Year	Team	Overall	Conference	Standing	Bowl/playoffs
Texas A&M–Kingsville Javelinas (Lone Star Conference) (2015–2019)
2015	Texas A&M–Kingsville	2–9	0–6	7th	
2016	Texas A&M–Kingsville	9–3	6–3	T–3rd	W Live United Texarkana
2017	Texas A&M–Kingsville	4–7	2–6	7th	
2018	Texas A&M–Kingsville	4–7	2–6	7th	
2019	Texas A&M–Kingsville	2–9	1–7	T–8th	
Texas A&M–Kingsville:		21–35	11–28		
Total:		21–35			
