= 2018 Tarleton State Texans football team =

American college football season

2018 Tarleton State Texans football
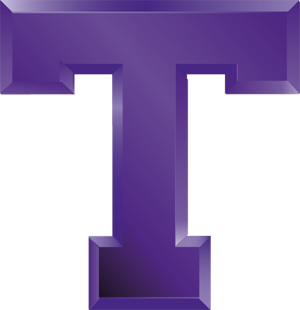

LSC champion

NCAA Division II Quarterfinal, L 10–13 at Minnesota State
- Conference: Lone Star Conference

Ranking
- AFCA: No. 5
- Record: 12–1 (8–0 LSC)
- Head coach: Todd Whitten (9th season)
- Co-offensive coordinators: Jonathan Beasley (2nd season); Bryson Oliver (3rd season)
- Offensive scheme: Spread
- Defensive coordinator: Marcus Patton (3rd season)
- Base defense: 4–3
- Home stadium: Memorial Stadium

2018 Lone Star Conference football standings
	Conf.			Overall
Team	W		L	W		L
No. 5 Tarleton State $^	8	–	0	12	–	1
No. 9 Texas A&M–Commerce ^	7	–	1	10	–	3
No. 25 Midwestern State	6	–	2	8	–	2
Angelo State #	4	–	4	6	–	6
West Texas A&M	4	–	4	6	–	5
Eastern New Mexico	4	–	4	5	–	6
Texas A&M–Kingsville	2	–	6	4	–	7
UT Permian Basin	1	–	7	2	–	9
Western New Mexico	0	–	8	0	–	10
$ – Conference champion; ^ – NCAA Division II playoff participant; # – C.H.A.M.P.S. Heart of Texas Bowl participant; Rankings from AFCA poll

The 2018 Tarleton State Texans football team represented Tarleton State University in the 2018 NCAA Division II football season. They were led by head coach Todd Whitten, who was in his third consecutive season at Tarleton State and ninth overall as the head coach of the program. The Texans played their home games at Memorial Stadium and were members of the Lone Star Conference. The Texans finished the regular season with an overall record of 10–0 record and mark of 8–0 in conference play, and winning the LSC championship.

== Schedule ==
Tarleton State announced its 2018 football schedule on May 14, 2018. The schedule consisted of six home and five away games in the regular season.

The Texans hosted two of the three non-conference games against Delta State from the Gulf South Conference and Lincoln University but had an away game with Stephen F. Austin canceled.

Date	Time	Opponent	Rank	Site	Result	Attendance
August 30	7:00 p.m.	Delta State*		Memorial Stadium; Stephenville, TX	W 44–13	4,781
September 8	6:00 p.m.	at Stephen F. Austin*		Homer Bryce Stadium; Nacogdoches, TX	Cancelled (Note: Game was cancelled due to inclement weather.)	
September 15	6:00 p.m.	at West Texas A&M		Kimbrough Memorial Stadium; Canyon, TX	W 44–7	5,542
September 22	7:00 p.m.	Texas–Permian Basin		Memorial Stadium; Stephenville, TX	W 35–13	5,634
September 29	6:00 p.m.	at Angelo State		LeGrand Sports Complex; San Angelo, TX	W 54–33	2,895
October 6	7:00 p.m.	Eastern New Mexico	No. 25	Memorial Stadium; Stephenville, TX	W 48–28	4,213
October 13	4:00 p.m.	at No. 7 Texas A&M–Commerce	No. 16	Memorial Stadium; Commerce, TX	W 47–21	6,875
October 20	6:00 p.m.	Texas A&M–Kingsville	No. 9	Memorial Stadium; Stephenville, TX	W 59–21	6,534
October 27	7:00 p.m.	at No. 10 Midwestern State	No. 8	Memorial Stadium; Wichita Falls, TX	W 35–34 ^{OT}	9,247
November 3	2:00 p.m.	Lincoln (MO)*	No. 8	Memorial Stadium; Stephenville, TX	W 59–3	4,127
November 10	2:00 p.m.	Western New Mexico	No. 7	Memorial Stadium; Stephenville, TX	W 58–0	2,459
November 17	1:00 p.m.	No. 24 Azusa Pacific*	No. 7	Memorial Stadium; Stephenville, TX (NCAA Division II First Round)	W 58–0	4,713
November 24	1:00 p.m.	No. 15 Texas A&M–Commerce*	No. 7	Memorial Stadium; Stephenville, TX (NCAA Division II Second Round)	W 34–28	5,231
December 1	12:00 p.m.	at No. 1 Minnesota State*	No. 7	Blakeslee Stadium; Mankato, MN (NCAA Division II Quarterfinal)	L 10–13	1,358
*Non-conference game; Rankings from AFCA Poll released prior to the game; All times are in Central time

== Players drafted into the NFL ==
Round	Pick	Player	Position	NFL club
5	164	E. J. Speed	LB	Indianapolis Colts
