= 2018 Humboldt State Lumberjacks football team =

American college football season

2018 Humboldt State Lumberjacks football
- Conference: Great Northwest Athletic Conference
- Record: 2–8 (2–6 GNAC)
- Head coach: Damaro Wheeler (1st season)
- Home stadium: Redwood Bowl

2018 Great Northwest Athletic Conference football standings
	Conf.			Overall
Team	W		L	W		L
Azusa Pacific +^	7	–	1	8	–	4
Central Washington +	7	–	1	8	–	3
Western Oregon	4	–	4	5	–	6
Humboldt State	2	–	6	2	–	8
Simon Fraser	0	–	8	1	–	9
+ – Conference co-champions; ^ – NCAA Division II playoff participant; Rankings from AFCA Poll

The 2018 Humboldt State Lumberjacks football team represented Humboldt State University as a member of the Great Northwest Athletic Conference (GNAC) in the 2018 NCAA Division II football season. Led by first-year head coach Damaro Wheeler, the Lumberjacks compiled an overall record of 2–8 with a mark of 2–6 conference play, placing fourth in the GNAC. Humboldt State played home games at the Redwood Bowl in Arcata, California.

This was the final season for the Humboldt State football program, as the school discontinued the sport at the conclusion of the 2018 season.

== Schedule ==
Date	Time	Opponent	Site	Result	Attendance	Source
September 1	5:00 p.m.	at No. 11 Midwestern State*	Memorial Stadium; Wichita Falls, TX	L 12–55	7,927	
September 15	4:00 p.m.	at No. 15 Central Washington	Tomlinson Stadium; Ellensburg, WA	L 0–49	2,190	
September 22	6:00 p.m.	Western Oregon	Redwood Bowl; Arcata, CA	L 13–38	4,137	
September 29	6:00 p.m.	at Azusa Pacific	Cougar Athletic Stadium; Azusa, CA	L 21–37	3,788	
October 6	6:00 p.m.	Simon Fraser^{†}	Redwood Bowl; Arcata, CA	W 23–16	5,761	
October 13	11:00 a.m.	at Texas–Permian Basin*	Ratliff Stadium; Odessa, TX	L 17–36	3,641	
October 20	1:05 p.m.	at Western Oregon	McArthur Field; Monmouth, OR	L 24–45	3,275	
October 27	6:00 p.m.	No. 20 Central Washington	Redwood Bowl; Arcata, CA	L 24–62	1,527	
November 3	1:00 p.m.	Azusa Pacific	Redwood Bowl; Arcata, CA	L 17–20	4,315	
November 10	1:00 p.m.	at Simon Fraser	Terry Fox Field; Burnaby, BC	W 23–16	648	
*Non-conference game; ^{†}Homecoming; Rankings from AFCA Poll released prior to the game; All times are in Pacific time
