= 2018 UT Permian Basin Falcons football team =

American college football season

2018 UT Permian Basin Falcons football
- Conference: Lone Star Conference
- Record: 2–9 (1–7 LSC)
- Head coach: Justin Carrigan (3rd season)
- Offensive scheme: Spread
- Co-defensive coordinators: Chris Mineo (3rd season); Jacob Martin (3rd season)
- Base defense: 3–4
- Home stadium: Ratliff Stadium; Grande Communications Stadium

2018 Lone Star Conference football standings
	Conf.			Overall
Team	W		L	W		L
No. 5 Tarleton State $^	8	–	0	12	–	1
No. 9 Texas A&M–Commerce ^	7	–	1	10	–	3
No. 25 Midwestern State	6	–	2	8	–	2
Angelo State #	4	–	4	6	–	6
West Texas A&M	4	–	4	6	–	5
Eastern New Mexico	4	–	4	5	–	6
Texas A&M–Kingsville	2	–	6	4	–	7
UT Permian Basin	1	–	7	2	–	9
Western New Mexico	0	–	8	0	–	10
$ – Conference champion; ^ – NCAA Division II playoff participant; # – C.H.A.M.P.S. Heart of Texas Bowl participant; Rankings from AFCA poll

The 2018 UT Permian Basin Falcons football team represented the University of Texas Permian Basin in the 2018 NCAA Division II football season. They were led by third-year head coach Justin Carrigan. The Falcons played their home games at Ratliff Stadium in Odessa, Texas, with one home game played at Grande Communications Stadium in Midland, and were members of the Lone Star Conference (LSC). The team matched its record from the previous two seasons, finishing with a record of 2–9 and went 1–7 in conference play.

Prior to the start of the season, it was announced that offensive coordinator/quarterbacks coach Scott Preston had left the program. Preston took a coaching position with an unknown team. Head coach Justin Carrigan took over as offensive coordinator and quarterbacks coach.

== Preseason ==
=== LSC media poll ===
In the LSC's preseason poll, the Falcons were predicted to finish second-to-last in the conference, though they also received a first-place vote.

== Schedule ==
The Falcons' 2018 schedule was released on April 11, 2018, and consisted of six home games and five away games. The team hosted LSC foes Midwestern State, Western New Mexico, Angelo State, and Texas A&M–Commerce, and traveled to Tarleton State, West Texas A&M, Eastern New Mexico, and Texas A&M–Kingsville.

The Falcons hosted non-conference foe Humboldt State from the Great Northwest Athletic Conference and traveled to Texas Southern from the Southwestern Athletic Conference and Northern Michigan from the Great Lakes Intercollegiate Athletic Conference.

Date	Time	Opponent	Site	Result	Attendance
September 1	9:35 p.m.	at Texas Southern*	BBVA Compass Stadium; Houston, TX	L 16–26	1,824
September 8	1:00 p.m.	at Northern Michigan*	Superior Dome; Marquette, MI	L 22–27	2,174
September 15	6:00 p.m.	No. 7 Midwestern State	Ratliff Stadium; Odessa, TX	L 21–43	3,579
September 22	7:00 p.m.	at Tarleton State	Memorial Stadium; Stephenville, TX	L 13–35	5,634
September 29	6:00 p.m.	Western New Mexico	Ratliff Stadium; Odessa, TX	W 21–20	3,875
October 6	6:00 p.m.	at West Texas A&M	Kimbrough Memorial Stadium; Canyon, TX	L 21–42	6,399
October 13	6:00 p.m.	Humboldt State*^{†}	Ratliff Stadium; Odessa, TX	W 36–17	3,641
October 20	6:00 p.m.	Angelo State	Grande Communications Stadium; Midland, TX	L 20–44	3,565
October 27	7:00 p.m.	at Eastern New Mexico	Greyhound Stadium; Portales, NM	L 7–24	1,261
November 3	6:00 p.m.	No. 16 Texas A&M–Commerce	Ratliff Stadium; Odessa, TX	L 17–20	3,958
November 10	7:00 p.m.	at Texas A&M–Kingsville	Javelina Stadium; Kingsville, TX	L 21–24	3,247
*Non-conference game; ^{†}Homecoming; Rankings from AFCA Poll released prior to the game; All times are in Central time

Schedule source:

== Roster ==
2018 UT Permian Basin Falcons football team roster
Players
Coaches
Offense

Pos.	#	Name	Class
WR	2	Mitchell Leonard	Sr
QB	4	Kameron Mathis	Jr
WR	5	Kristian Brown	Jr
QB	6	Michael Myers	So
QB	8	Sam Allen	Jr
WR	9	Kyle McBride	Jr
QB	14	Taylor Null	Fr
QB	16	Bubba Henson	Fr
WR	17	Ben Galaviz	Jr
RB	21	Adrian Walker	Fr
RB	28	Jamil Pittman	Fr
RB	31	Jameel Hodges	Fr
RB	35	Marquis Simmons	Jr
RB	37	Leroy Giles	Fr
TE	41	Colton Tuiasosopo	Jr
TE	42	Phillip Taylor	Jr
TE	45	Matt Zubiate	Fr
OL	52	William Draker	Fr
OL	55	Tavita Hamilton	Jr
OL	56	Dominic Assad	Jr
OL	58	Ja'Vaun Johnson	Jr
OL	60	Derrick Assad	Fr
OL	62	Addisun Brown	Fr
OL	63	Ivan Pena	Fr
OL	64	Pablo Gutierrez	Jr
OL	65	D'Andre Wilkerson	Jr
OL	66	Trace Notley	So
OL	67	Dylan Ohrt	So
OL	70	Hunter Bowers	Jr
OL	71	Hector Herrera	Jr
OL	72	Josh Sanders	Fr
OL	73	Matt Groeschel	Fr
OL	75	Ovidio Melendez	Fr
OL	76	Brontre' Wright	Jr
OL	79	Ryan Wilson	So
WR	80	Michael Foster	So
WR	82	Baylon Ware	Fr
WR	83	Grant Brown	Fr
TE	85	Toby Harrah	Fr
TE	86	Levi Rucker	Fr
WR	88	Patrick Sullivan	Fr
WR	89	Trey Patterson	Fr
WR		Jaquavian Dabbs	Jr
WR		Johnathon Driskell	Fr
WR		James Jefferson	Fr
WR		Tre Jessie	Fr
RB		Eddie Perez	Fr
RB		Demarcus Womack	So

Defense

Pos.	#	Name	Class
DT	1	Jared Thames	Sr
DB	3	Marquis Davenport	Jr
DB	7	Justin Nicholls	Sr
LB	10	Marquee Allison	Sr
DB	11	Diameon Brewer	Jr
CB	12	Alonzo Turner	Jr
DB	13	Tristen Thompson	Sr
S	15	Montique Coles	Jr
CB	16	Jaques Tyler	Fr
S	18	Ryan Baker	Jr
LB	19	Marquez Byrd	Jr
S	20	Javier Gomez III	Jr
S	22	Josh Terrell	Jr
DB	23	Quinn Tinley	Fr
OLB	24	John O'Kelley	So
S	25	BJ Huitt	Jr
DE	26	Ashad Guice	Sr
DB	27	Jack Lacy	Jr
S	29	Jeff Douglas	So
S	30	Xavier Brooks	Jr
DB	32	Martin Brown IV	So
DE	34	Logo Kaleopa	Jr
DB	36	Trent Ward	Fr
LB	38	Kadarryus Hartfield	Fr
S	39	Frank Kriegbaum	So
LB	40	Chris Hoad	Jr
LB	43	Miquon Mayes	So
LB	44	Keegan Gray	Jr
S	47	Korbin Martinez	Jr
CB	48	Clifton Holmes	So
LB	50	Sebastian Gonzales	Fr
LB	51	Derrian Forge	Fr
DL	55	Tavita Hamilton	Jr
DT	90	Ray Dinnall-Guerra	Jr
DE	91	Austin Price	Fr
DE	92	Jordan Scales	Fr
DT	93	Cole Stephenson	Fr
LB	94	Reagan Havis	So
DT	96	Tyson Carter	Fr
DT	97	Jacob Granado	Jr
DT	98	La'Daidreain Glasker	So
DE	99	Diego Assad	Jr
LB		Jaden Deaton	Fr
LB		Hunter Graves	Fr
DE		Beau Narrell	Fr
DB		Noe Rodriguez	Jr
LB		Emilio Solis	Jr
DB		Jack Tinnyhill	Fr

Special teams

Pos.	#	Name	Class
P	46	Matt Harper	So
K	49	Sergio Landeros	Fr
P, K	87	Jackson Millar	Fr
LS	95	Brandon Vasquez	So

Head coach

- Justin Carrigan
  Head coach/offensive coordinator

Coordinators/assistant coaches

- Chris Mineo
  Associate head coach/co-defensive coordinator/defensive line
- Jacob Martin
  Co-defensive coordinator/linebackers
- Carlos Barocio-Leon
  Special teams coordinator/running backs
- Boone Feldt
  Offensive line
- Kyle Williams
  Defensive passing game coordinator/secondary
- A. J. Woolley
  Tight ends
- Tyler Wright
  Quarterbacks
- Javaris Williams
  Safeties
- Jeremiah Williams
  Wide receivers
- Jesse Perez
  Wide receivers
- Cameron Hurd
  Defensive line

Legend

- (C) Team captain
- (S) Suspended
- (I) Ineligible
- Injured
- Redshirt

Roster
Last update: August 10, 2023

== Game summaries ==
=== At Texas Southern ===
UT Permian Basin Falcons at Texas Southern Tigers – Game summary

Quarter	1	2	3	4	Total
Falcons	2	0	0	14	16
Tigers	13	3	7	3	26

at BBVA Compass Stadium, Houston, Texas

- Date: September 1
- Game time: 9:35 p.m. CDT
- Game weather: Cloudy and warm
- Game attendance: 1,824
- Referee: Tony Ross
- Box score, Recap

Game information
First quarter
- TSU – Bobby Hartzog 39-yard pass from Glen Cuiellette (Aaron Cuevas kick), 9:34. Tigers 7–0. Drive: 5 plays, 80 yards, 3:07.
- TSU – Tren'Davian 15-yard pass from Glen Cuiellette (kick blocked), 5:53. Tigers 13–0. Drive: 4 plays, 40 yards, 2:10.
- UTPB – Diameon Brewer 98-yard defensive PAT return, 5:53. Tigers 13–2.

Second quarter

- TSU – Aaron Cuevas 43-yard field goal, 0:00. Tigers 16–2. Drive: 11 plays, 73 yards, 4:35.

Third quarter

- TSU – Bryston Cummings 2-yard pass from Glen Cuiellette (Aaron Cuevas kick), 2:58. Tigers 23–2. Drive: 7 plays, 50 yards, 3:03.

Fourth quarter

- UTPB – Sam Allen 2-yard run (kick failed), 14:51. Tigers 23–8. Drive: 10 plays, 71 yards, 3:01.
- TSU – Aaron Cuevas 41-yard field goal, 10:37. Tigers 26–8. Drive: 4 plays, -2 yards, 1:27.
- UTPB – Ben Galaviz 64-yard pass from Sam Allen (Sam Allen pass to Kyle McBride), 8:58. Tigers 26–16. Drive: 5 plays, 80 yards, 1:29.

Statistics	UTPB	TSU
First downs	14	21
Total yards	297	363
Rushing yards	182	128
Passing yards	115	235
Turnovers	1	3
Time of possession	23:10	36:50

Team	Category	Player	Statistics
UT Permian Basin	Passing	Sam Allen	4/11, 84 yards, TD
UT Permian Basin	Rushing	Marquis Simmons	10 rushes, 78 yards
UT Permian Basin	Receiving	Ben Galaviz	3 receptions, 78 yards, TD
Texas Southern	Passing	Glen Cuiellette	19/33, 235 yards, 3 TD, 2 INT
Texas Southern	Rushing	Brad Woodard	16 rushes, 74 yards
Texas Southern	Receiving	Adrian Carter	2 receptions, 46 yards

Kickoff was originally scheduled for 7:00 p.m., but was delayed two-and-a-half hours due to severe weather and heavy rain in Houston.

=== At Northern Michigan ===
UT Permian Basin Falcons at Northern Michigan Wildcats – Game summary

Quarter	1	2	3	4	Total
Falcons	0	7	3	12	22
Wildcats	10	7	3	7	27

at Superior Dome, Marquette, Michigan

- Date: September 8
- Game time: 1:00 p.m. CDT/2:00 p.m. EDT
- Game weather: None (played indoors)
- Game attendance: 2,174
- Referee: Brad Mutnick
- Box score, Recap

Game information
First quarter
- NMU – Deandre Caldwell 23-yard run (Daniel Riser kick), 13:08. Wildcats 7–0. Drive: 4 plays, 65 yards, 1:52.
- NMU – Daniel Riser 20-yard field goal, 4:14. Wildcats 10–0. Drive: 13 plays, 64 yards, 7:00.

Second quarter

- UTPB – Ben Galaviz 18-yard pass from Sam Allen (Sergio Landeros kick), 14:55. Wildcats 10–7. Drive: 9 plays, 76 yards, 4:12.
- NMU – Ben Loutsis 15-yard pass from Latrell Giles (Daniel Riser kick), 1:27. Wildcats 17–7. Drive: 11 plays, 73 yards, 6:09.

Third quarter

- NMU – Daniel Riser 21-yard field goal, 6:40. Wildcats 20–7. Drive: 13 plays, 73 yards, 6:36.
- UTPB – Sergio Landeros 32-yard field goal, 5:09. Wildcats 20–10. Drive: 7 plays, 60 yards, 1:31.

Fourth quarter

- UTPB – Mitchell Leonard 19-yard pass from Sam Allen (kick blocked), 11:45. Wildcats 20–16. Drive: 3 plays, 49 yards, 0:49.
- NMU – Jake Mayon 24-yard run (Daniel Riser kick), 4:50. Wildcats 27–16. Drive: 10 plays, 68 yards, 6:47.
- UTPB – Mitchell Leonard 31-yard pass from Sam Allen (pass failed), 2:21. Wildcats 27–22. Drive: 12 plays, 75 yards, 2:29.

Statistics	UTPB	NMU
First downs	19	28
Total yards	327	454
Rushing yards	66	337
Passing yards	261	117
Turnovers	0	0
Time of possession	19:45	40:15

Team	Category	Player	Statistics
UT Permian Basin	Passing	Sam Allen	18/36, 261 yards, 3 TD
UT Permian Basin	Rushing	Marquis Simmons	8 rushes, 53 yards
UT Permian Basin	Receiving	Kristian Brown	4 receptions, 83 yards
Northern Michigan	Passing	Latrell Giles	8/12, 117 yards, TD
Northern Michigan	Rushing	Jake Mayon	35 rushes, 224 yards, TD
Northern Michigan	Receiving	Ben Loutsis	3 receptions, 55 yards, TD

=== No. 7 Midwestern State ===
No. 7 Midwestern State Mustangs at UT Permian Basin Falcons – Game summary

Quarter	1	2	3	4	Total
No. 7 Mustangs	0	14	22	7	43
Falcons	0	7	7	7	21

at Ratliff Stadium, Odessa, Texas

- Date: September 15
- Game time: 6:00 p.m. CDT
- Game weather: Mostly cloudy, 78 °F (26 °C)
- Game attendance: 3,579
- Box score, Recap

Game information
First quarter
- No scoring plays

Second quarter

- UTPB – Marquis Simmons 8-yard run (Sergio Landeros kick), 13:21. Falcons 7–0. Drive: 14 plays, 97 yards, 6:27.
- MSU – Anthony Tennison 8-yard pass from Layton Rabb (Jaron Imbriani kick), 6:40. Tied 7–7. Drive: 7 plays, 67 yards, 2:24.
- MSU – Anthony Tennison 41-yard pass from Layton Rabb (Jaron Imbriani kick), 0:00. Mustangs 14–7. Drive: 8 plays, 93 yards, 1:55.

Third quarter

- MSU – Vincent Johnson 1-yard run (Jaron Imbriani kick), 11:21. Mustangs 21–7. Drive: 6 plays, 46 yards, 2:10.
- UTPB – Ben Galaviz 27-yard pass from Taylor Null (Sergio Landeros kick), 7:59. Mustangs 21–14. Drive: 9 plays, 75 yards, 3:22.
- MSU – Vincent Johnson 82-yard run (Bryce Martinez run), 7:43. Mustangs 29–14. Drive: 1 play, 82 yards, 0:11.
- MSU – Anthony Tennison 14-yard pass from Layton Rabb (Jaron Imbriani kick), 2:36. Mustangs 36–14. Drive: 6 plays, 56 yards, 3:06.

Fourth quarter

- MSU – Layton Rabb 10-yard run (Jaron Imbriani kick), 10:15. Mustangs 43–14. Drive: 7 plays, 47 yards, 4:24.
- UTPB – Kristian Brown 56-yard pass from Taylor Null (Sergio Landeros kick), 7:07. Mustangs 43–21. Drive: 7 plays, 73 yards, 3:07.

Statistics	MSU	UTPB
First downs	26	24
Total yards	564	388
Rushing yards	261	88
Passing yards	303	300
Turnovers	0	2
Time of possession	28:43	31:17

Team	Category	Player	Statistics
Midwestern State	Passing	Layton Rabb	20/34, 291 yards, 3 TD
Midwestern State	Rushing	Vincent Johnson	19 rushes, 195 yards, 2 TD
Midwestern State	Receiving	Juwan Johnson	8 receptions, 132 yards
UT Permian Basin	Passing	Taylor Null	22/35, 300 yards, 2 TD, 2 INT
UT Permian Basin	Rushing	Marquis Simmons	24 rushes, 101 yards, TD
UT Permian Basin	Receiving	Kristian Brown	5 receptions, 120 yards, TD

=== At Tarleton State ===
UT Permian Basin Falcons at Tarleton State Texans – Game summary

Quarter	1	2	3	4	Total
Falcons	13	0	0	0	13
Texans	19	13	3	0	35

at Memorial Stadium, Stephenville, Texas

- Date: September 22
- Game time: 7:00 p.m. CDT
- Game weather: Cloudy, 67 °F (19 °C)
- Game attendance: 5,634
- Referee: Bryant Thompson
- Box score, Recap

Game information
First quarter
- UTPB – Leroy Giles 15-yard run (kick failed), 12:47. Falcons 6–0. Drive: 2 plays, 15 yards, 0:14.
- TSU – Daniel McCants 24-yard run (kick failed), 9:28. Tied 6–6. Drive: 9 plays, 70 yards, 3:11.
- TSU – J. F. Thomas 34-yard pass from Ben Holmes (kick blocked), 5:36. Texans 12–6. Drive: 5 plays, 58 yards, 2:48.
- UTPB – Kristian Brown 35-yard pass from Taylor Null (Sergio Landeros kick), 4:39. Falcons 13–12. Drive: 3 plays, 71 yards, 0:49.
- TSU – Zimari Manning 17-yard pass from Ben Holmes (Joanly Martinez kick), 1:57. Texans 19–13. Drive: 10 plays, 71 yards, 2:32.

Second quarter

- TSU – Daniel McCants 18-yard run (kick blocked), 12:33. Texans 25–13. Drive: 7 plays, 66 yards, 2:07.
- TSU – Zimari Manning 31-yard pass from Ben Holmes (Joanly Martinez kick), 3:58. Texans 32–13. Drive: 1 play, 41 yards, 0:07.

Third quarter

- TSU – Joanly Martinez 29-yard field goal, 3:01. Texans 35–13. Drive: 11 plays, 38 yards, 4:04.

Fourth quarter

- No scoring plays

Statistics	UTPB	TSU
First downs	14	32
Total yards	228	580
Rushing yards	53	384
Passing yards	175	196
Turnovers	1	2
Time of possession	25:54	34:06

Team	Category	Player	Statistics
UT Permian Basin	Passing	Taylor Null	18/41, 175 yards, TD, INT
UT Permian Basin	Rushing	Leroy Giles	4 rushes, 29 yards, TD
UT Permian Basin	Receiving	Kristian Brown	4 receptions, 77 yards, TD
Tarleton State	Passing	Ben Holmes	17/23, 196 yards, 3 TD, INT
Tarleton State	Rushing	Daniel McCants	20 rushes, 162 yards, 2 TD
Tarleton State	Receiving	Zimari Manning	5 receptions, 95 yards, 2 TD

=== Western New Mexico ===
Western New Mexico Mustangs at UT Permian Basin Falcons – Game summary

Quarter	1	2	3	4	Total
Mustangs	7	0	13	0	20
Falcons	7	0	0	14	21

at Ratliff Stadium, Odessa, Texas

- Date: September 29
- Game time: 6:00 p.m.
- Game attendance: 3,875
- Box score, Recap

Game information
First quarter
- UTPB – Kyle McBride 11-yard pass from Taylor Null (Sergio Landeros kick), 4:44. Falcons 7–0. Drive: 7 plays, 64 yards, 2:36.
- WNMU – Evan Beebe 14-yard pass from Blayne Armstrong (Ignacio Correa kick), 2:47. Tied 7–7. Drive: 5 plays, 58 yards, 1:48.

Second quarter

- No scoring plays

Third quarter

- WNMU – Evan Beebe 6-yard pass from Blayne Armstrong (Collin Grady kick), 5:50. Mustangs 14–7. Drive: 12 plays, 80 yards, 4:12.
- WNMU – Isaiah Pierre 74-yard punt return (kick blocked), 1:43. Mustangs 20–7.

Fourth quarter

- UTPB – Kristian Brown 14-yard pass from Taylor Null (Sergio Landeros kick), 7:01. Mustangs 20–14. Drive: 5 plays, 61 yards, 1:13.
- UTPB – Marquis Simmons 9-yard run (Sergio Landeros kick), 0:15. Falcons 21–20. Drive: 9 plays, 85 yards, 1:36.

Statistics	WNMU	UTPB
First downs	19	24
Total yards	233	441
Rushing yards	92	152
Passing yards	141	289
Turnovers	2	2
Time of possession	28:40	31:20

Team	Category	Player	Statistics
Western New Mexico	Passing	Blayne Armstrong	15/33, 141 yards, 2 TD, 2 INT
Western New Mexico	Rushing	Justin Harris	7 rushes, 34 yards
Western New Mexico	Receiving	Elijah Jones	4 receptions, 47 yards
UT Permian Basin	Passing	Taylor Null	23/47, 289 yards, 2 TD
UT Permian Basin	Rushing	Leroy Giles	6 rushes, 59 yards
UT Permian Basin	Receiving	Kyle McBride	7 receptions, 128 yards, TD

=== At West Texas A&M ===
UT Permian Basin Falcons at West Texas A&M Buffaloes – Game summary

Quarter	1	2	3	4	Total
Falcons	7	14	0	0	21
Buffaloes	7	14	7	14	42

at Kimbrough Memorial Stadium, Canyon, Texas

- Date: October 6
- Game time: 6:00 p.m. CDT
- Game weather: Cloudy, 50 °F (10 °C)
- Game attendance: 6,399
- Referee: Chad Wakefield
- Box score, Recap

Game information
First quarter
- UTPB – Kyle McBride 82-yard pass from Taylor Null (Sergio Landeros kick), 11:51. Falcons 7–0. Drive: 2 plays, 83 yards, 0:39.
- WTAMU – Duke Carter IV 1-yard run (Michael Shipley kick), 4:26. Tied 7–7. Drive: 3 plays, 25 yards, 1:25.

Second quarter

- WTAMU – Jordan Johnson 17-yard pass from Justin Houghtaling (Michael Shipley kick), 14:17. Buffaloes 14–7. Drive: 8 plays, 49 yards, 3:50.
- WTAMU – Tobias Harris 66-yard punt return (Michael Shipley kick), 13:00. Buffaloes 21–7.
- UTPB – Matt Zubiate 1-yard pass from Taylor Null (Sergio Landeros kick), 11:14. Buffaloes 21–14. Drive: 5 plays, 75 yards, 1:46.
- UTPB – Kameron Mathis 2-yard run (Sergio Landeros kick), 0:10. Tied 21–21. Drive: 14 plays, 71 yards, 4:40.

Third quarter

- WTAMU – Duke Carter IV 1-yard run (Michael Shipley kick), 8:52. Buffaloes 28–21. Drive: 8 plays, 70 yards, 4:51.

Fourth quarter

- WTAMU – Duke Carter IV 7-yard run (Michael Shipley kick), 12:51. Buffaloes 35–21. Drive: 9 plays, 64 yards, 4:31.
- WTAMU – Duke Carter IV 31-yard run (Michael Shipley kick), 7:22. Buffaloes 42–21. Drive: 7 plays, 80 yards, 3:45.

Statistics	UTPB	WTAMU
First downs	11	21
Total yards	292	397
Rushing yards	98	180
Passing yards	194	187
Turnovers	0	0
Time of possession	24:40	35:20

Team	Category	Player	Statistics
UT Permian Basin	Passing	Taylor Null	12/28, 194 yards, 2 TD
UT Permian Basin	Rushing	Marquis Simmons	10 rushes, 44 yards
UT Permian Basin	Receiving	Kyle McBride	2 receptions, 125 yards, TD
West Texas A&M	Passing	Justin Houghtaling	17/21, 187 yards, TD
West Texas A&M	Rushing	Duke Carter IV	29 rushes, 143 yards, 4 TD
West Texas A&M	Receiving	Jordan Johnson	4 receptions, 70 yards, TD

=== Humboldt State ===
Humboldt State Lumberjacks at UT Permian Basin Falcons – Game summary

Quarter	1	2	3	4	Total
Lumberjacks	0	0	17	0	17
Falcons	15	0	7	14	36

at Ratliff Stadium, Odessa, Texas

- Date: October 13
- Game time: 6:00 p.m. CDT
- Game attendance: 3,641
- Box score, Recap

Game information
First quarter
- UTPB – Kristian Brown 57-yard pass from Taylor Null (Kristian Brown run), 9:10. Falcons 8–0. Drive: 4 plays, 70 yards, 1:10.
- UTPB – Adrian Walker 11-yard run (Sergio Landeros kick), 4:14. Falcons 15–0. Drive: 6 plays, 67 yards, 2:31.

Second quarter

- No scoring plays

Third quarter

- HSU – Jose Morales 45-yard field goal, 11:33. Falcons 15–3. Drive: 7 plays, 27 yards, 3:24.
- UTPB – Baylon Ware 62-yard pass from Taylor Null (Sergio Landeros kick), 10:08. Falcons 22–3. Drive: 4 plays, 79 yards, 1:17.
- HSU – Kaleo Garrigan 30-yard pass from Joseph Sweeney (Jose Morales kick), 7:16. Falcons 22–10. Drive: 6 plays, 50 yards, 2:52.
- HSU – Kaleo Garrigan 40-yard pass from Joseph Sweeney (Jose Morales kick), 3:50. Falcons 22–17. Drive: 6 plays, 80 yards, 2:24.

Fourth quarter

- UTPB – Mitchell Leonard 23-yard pass from Taylor Null (Sergio Landeros kick), 13:48. Falcons 29–17. Drive: 7 plays, 52 yards, 3:05.
- UTPB – Ben Galaviz 41-yard pass from Taylor Null (Sergio Landeros kick), 5:46. Falcons 36–17. Drive: 2 plays, 47 yards, 0:39.

Statistics	HSU	UTPB
First downs	13	31
Total yards	322	595
Rushing yards	101	121
Passing yards	221	474
Turnovers	3	2
Time of possession	27:55	32:05

Team	Category	Player	Statistics
Humboldt State	Passing	Joseph Sweeney	12/24, 192 yards, 2 TD, 2 INT
Humboldt State	Rushing	Tyree Marzetta	12 rushes, 102 yards
Humboldt State	Receiving	Kaleo Garrigan	4 receptions, 88 yards, 2 TD
UT Permian Basin	Passing	Taylor Null	31/48, 430 yards, 4 TD, 2 INT
UT Permian Basin	Rushing	Marquis Simmons	12 rushes, 75 yards
UT Permian Basin	Receiving	Ben Galaviz	8 receptions, 92 yards, TD

=== Angelo State ===
Angelo State Rams at UT Permian Basin Falcons – Game summary

Quarter	1	2	3	4	Total
Rams	3	14	3	24	44
Falcons	0	13	7	0	20

at Grande Communications Stadium, Midland, Texas

- Date: October 20
- Game time: 6:00 p.m. CDT
- Game attendance: 3,565
- Referee: Robert Newton
- Box score, Recap

Game information
First quarter
- ASU – Connor Flanigan 35-yard field goal, 8:43. Rams 3–0. Drive: 12 plays, 58 yards, 3:58.

Second quarter

- UTPB – Ben Galaviz 25-yard pass from Taylor Null (pass failed), 9:56. Falcons 6–3. Drive: 6 plays, 90 yards, 2:18.
- ASU – Tyrese Nathan 4-yard run (Connor Flanigan kick), 8:43. Rams 10–6. Drive: 1 play, 4 yards, 0:04.
- ASU – Keke Chism 21-yard pass from Payne Sullins (Connor Flanigan kick), 3:19. Rams 17–6. Drive: 7 plays, 76 yards, 1:52.
- UTPB – Kyle McBride 34-yard pass from Taylor Null (Sergio Landeros kick), 0:40. Rams 17–13. Drive: 6 plays, 75 yards, 2:29.

Third quarter

- UTPB – Mitchell Leonard 5-yard pass from Taylor Null (Sergio Landeros kick), 8:39. Falcons 20–17. Drive: 11 plays, 74 yards, 4:40.
- ASU – Connor Flanigan 26-yard field goal, 2:41. Tied 20–20. Drive: 16 plays, 67 yards, 5:52.

Fourth quarter

- ASU – Larry Johnson 43-yard pass from Payne Sullins (Connor Flanigan kick), 11:29. Rams 27–20. Drive: 3 plays, 43 yards, 1:02.
- ASU – Weston McIntire 2-yard pass from Carsen Cook (Connor Flanigan kick), 7:04. Rams 34–20. Drive: 7 plays, 64 yards, 2:48.
- ASU – Hunter Kyle 31-yard interception return (Connor Flanigan kick), 6:50. Rams 41–20.
- ASU – Connor Flanigan 18-yard field goal, 3:50. Rams 44–20. Drive: 4 plays, 8 yards, 2:07.

Statistics	ASU	UTPB
First downs	18	27
Total yards	412	479
Rushing yards	120	70
Passing yards	292	409
Turnovers	1	5
Time of possession	28:45	31:15

Team	Category	Player	Statistics
Angelo State	Passing	Payne Sullins	22/35, 275 yards, 2 TD, INT
Angelo State	Rushing	Tyrese Nathan	16 rushes, 60 yards, TD
Angelo State	Receiving	Lawson Ayo	6 receptions, 105 yards
UT Permian Basin	Passing	Taylor Null	32/47, 409 yards, 3 TD, 3 INT
UT Permian Basin	Rushing	Leroy Giles	18 rushes, 65 yards
UT Permian Basin	Receiving	Kyle McBride	11 receptions, 142 yards, TD

=== At Eastern New Mexico ===
UT Permian Basin Falcons at Eastern New Mexico Greyhounds – Game summary

Quarter	1	2	3	4	Total
Falcons	0	7	0	0	7
Greyhounds	10	7	7	0	24

at Greyhound Stadium, Portales, New Mexico

- Date: October 27
- Game time: 7:00 p.m. CDT/6:00 p.m. MDT
- Game weather: Clear, 65 °F (18 °C)
- Game attendance: 1,261
- Box score, Recap

Game information
First quarter
- ENMU – Tyler Vargas 47-yard field goal, 6:56. Greyhounds 3–0. Drive: 14 plays, 40 yards, 6:09.
- ENMU – Wyatt Strand 10-yard run (Tyler Vargas kick), 0:16. Greyhounds 10–0. Drive: 8 plays, 60 yards, 3:42.

Second quarter

- UTPB – Kameron Mathis 1-yard run (Sergio Landeros kick), 2:08. Greyhounds 10–7. Drive: 14 plays, 83 yards, 6:54.
- ENMU – Johnny Smith 12-yard pass from Wyatt Strand (Tyler Vargas kick), 0:12. Greyhounds 17–7. Drive: 11 plays, 70 yards, 1:47.

Third quarter

- ENMU – Paul Terry 9-yard run (Tyler Vargas kick), 7:29. Greyhounds 24–7. Drive: 8 plays, 41 yards, 3:45.

Fourth quarter

- No scoring plays

Statistics	UTPB	ENMU
First downs	16	22
Total yards	273	306
Rushing yards	90	227
Passing yards	183	79
Turnovers	2	1
Time of possession	30:13	29:47

Team	Category	Player	Statistics
UT Permian Basin	Passing	Taylor Null	19/39, 163 yards, INT
UT Permian Basin	Rushing	Adrian Walker	10 rushes, 44 yards
UT Permian Basin	Receiving	Kyle McBride	7 receptions, 85 yards
Eastern New Mexico	Passing	Wyatt Strand	8/17, 79 yards, TD
Eastern New Mexico	Rushing	Paul Terry	22 rushes, 126 yards, TD
Eastern New Mexico	Receiving	Russell Montoya	2 receptions, 23 yards

=== No. 16 Texas A&M–Commerce ===
Texas A&M–Commerce Lions at UT Permian Basin Falcons – Game summary

Quarter	1	2	3	4	Total
No. 16 Lions	10	3	0	7	20
Falcons	7	10	0	0	17

at Ratliff Stadium, Odessa, Texas

- Date: November 3
- Game time: 6:00 p.m. CDT
- Game attendance: 3,958
- Box score, Recap

Game information
First quarter
- TAMUC – Kristov Martinez 26-yard field goal, 8:42. Lions 3–0. Drive: 5 plays, 25 yards, 1:46.
- UTPB – Michael Myers 11-yard pass from Taylor Null (Sergio Landeros kick), 6:19. Falcons 7–3. Drive: 7 plays, 81 yards, 2:20.
- TAMUC – Carandal Hale 15-yard run (Kristov Martinez kick), 4:20. Lions 10–7. Drive: 6 plays, 60 yards, 1:50.

Second quarter

- UTPB – Kristian Brown 15-yard pass from Taylor Null (Sergio Landeros kick), 1:55. Falcons 14–10. Drive: l7 plays, 48 yards, 3:26.
- TAMUC – Kristov Martinez 37-yard field goal, 1:10. Falcons 14–13. Drive: 4 plays, 2 yards, 0:35.
- UTPB – Sergio Landeros 34-yard field goal, 0:00. Falcons 17–13. Drive: 2 plays, 49 yards, 0:05.

Third quarter

- No scoring plays

Fourth quarter

- TAMUC – Kane Wilson 1-yard run (Kristov Martinez kick), 14:55. Lions 20–17. Drive: 10 plays, 52 yards, 3:51.

Statistics	TAMUC	UTPB
First downs	18	10
Total yards	400	137
Rushing yards	195	–69
Passing yards	205	206
Turnovers	2	1
Time of possession	34:56	25:04

Team	Category	Player	Statistics
Texas A&M–Commerce	Passing	Kane Wilson	19/29, 205 yards
Texas A&M–Commerce	Rushing	Ovie Urevbu	27 rushes, 195 yards
Texas A&M–Commerce	Receiving	Kelan Smith	8 receptions, 93 yards
UT Permian Basin	Passing	Taylor Null	18/34, 179 yards, 2 TD
UT Permian Basin	Rushing	Leroy Giles	4 rushes, 4 yards
UT Permian Basin	Receiving	Kristian Brown	4 receptions, 86 yards, TD

=== At Texas A&M–Kingsville ===
UT Permian Basin Falcons at Texas A&M–Kingsville Javelinas – Game summary

Quarter	1	2	3	4	Total
Falcons	7	7	7	0	21
Javelinas	0	14	3	7	24

at Javelina Stadium, Kingsville, Texas

- Date: November 10
- Game time: 7:00 p.m. CST
- Game weather: Cloudy, 55 °F (13 °C)
- Game attendance: 3,247
- Referee: Brad Fisby
- Box score, Recap

Game information
First quarter
- UTPB – Leroy Giles 17-yard run (Sergio Landeros kick), 8:46. Falcons 7–0. Drive: 5 plays, 30 yards, 1:55.

Second quarter

- TAMUK – Brandon Smith 3-yard pass from Koy Detmar Jr. (Julio de la Garza kick), 14:15. Tied 7–7. Drive: 9 plays, 70 yards, 3:56.
- TAMUK – Ryan Martinez 32-yard pass from Koy Detmar Jr. (Julio de la Garza kick), 10:30. Javelinas 14–7. Drive: 5 plays, 53 yards, 1:52.
- UTPB – Hunter Bowers 3-yard pass from Kameron Mathis (Sergio Landeros kick), 0:21. Tied 14–14. Drive: 5 plays, 33 yards, 1:39.

Third quarter

- TAMUK – Julio de la Garza 40-yard field goal, 10:39. Javelinas 17–14. Drive: 4 plays, 0 yards, 1:58.
- UTPB – Kameron Mathis 1-yard run (Sergio Landeros kick), 6:10. Falcons 21–17. Drive: 7 plays, 15 yards, 2:07.

Fourth quarter

- TAMUK – Aaron Dilworth 16-yard pass from Koy Detmar Jr. (Julio de la Garza kick), 14:12. Javelinas 24–21. Drive: 6 plays, 61 yards, 2:04.

Statistics	UTPB	TAMUK
First downs	21	14
Total yards	258	373
Rushing yards	137	124
Passing yards	121	249
Turnovers	2	3
Time of possession	31:16	28:44

Team	Category	Player	Statistics
UT Permian Basin	Passing	Kameron Mathis	13/33, 115 yards, TD, INT
UT Permian Basin	Rushing	Kameron Mathis	11 rushes, 36 yards, TD
UT Permian Basin	Receiving	Kristian Brown	5 receptions, 44 yards
Texas A&M–Kingsville	Passing	Koy Detmar Jr.	22/39, 249 yards, 3 TD
Texas A&M–Kingsville	Rushing	Nick Pelrean	16 rushes, 104 yards
Texas A&M–Kingsville	Receiving	Tyler Wilson	11 receptions, 127 yards

== Statistics ==
=== Scoring ===
Scores against non-conference opponents

	1	2	3	4	Total
Opponents	23	10	27	10	70
UT Permian Basin	17	7	10	40	74

Scores against the Lone Star Conference

	1	2	3	4	Total
Opponents	56	79	58	59	252
UT Permian Basin	41	58	21	21	141

Scores against all opponents

	1	2	3	4	Total
Opponents	79	89	85	69	322
UT Permian Basin	58	65	31	61	215
