= 2018 West Texas A&M Buffaloes football team =

American college football season

2018 West Texas A&M Buffaloes football
- Conference: Lone Star Conference
- Record: 6–5 (4–4 LSC)
- Head coach: Hunter Hughes (2nd season)
- Offensive coordinator: Ryan McDonough (2nd season)
- Offensive scheme: Multiple
- Defensive coordinator: Miles Kochevar (2nd season)
- Base defense: 3–4
- Home stadium: Kimbrough Memorial Stadium

2018 Lone Star Conference football standings
	Conf.			Overall
Team	W		L	W		L
No. 5 Tarleton State $^	8	–	0	12	–	1
No. 9 Texas A&M–Commerce ^	7	–	1	10	–	3
No. 25 Midwestern State	6	–	2	8	–	2
Angelo State #	4	–	4	6	–	6
West Texas A&M	4	–	4	6	–	5
Eastern New Mexico	4	–	4	5	–	6
Texas A&M–Kingsville	2	–	6	4	–	7
UT Permian Basin	1	–	7	2	–	9
Western New Mexico	0	–	8	0	–	10
$ – Conference champion; ^ – NCAA Division II playoff participant; # – C.H.A.M.P.S. Heart of Texas Bowl participant; Rankings from AFCA poll

The 2018 West Texas A&M Buffaloes football team represented West Texas A&M University in the 2018 NCAA Division II football season as members of the Lone Star Conference (LSC). The Buffaloes were led by second-year head coach Hunter Hughes. The team played its home games at Kimbrough Memorial Stadium in Canyon, Texas. This was the last year the Buffaloes played their home games at Kimbrough Memorial as the Canyon Independent School District purchased the stadium from the university; the team moved to the on-campus Buffalo Stadium (later renamed Bain–Schaeffer Buffalo Stadium) starting with the 2019 season.

The Buffaloes finished the 2018 season with an overall record of 6–5, going 4–4 in LSC play to finish in a three-way tie for fourth place.

== Preseason ==
=== LSC media poll ===
The LSC media poll was released on July 30, 2018. The Buffaloes were predicted to finish seventh in the conference.

== Schedule ==
Date	Time	Opponent	Site	Result	Attendance
September 1	8:00 p.m.	at Azusa Pacific*	Citrus Stadium; Glendora, CA	L 7–17	5,117
September 8	6:00 p.m.	Oklahoma Panhandle State*	Kimbrough Memorial Stadium; Canyon, TX	W 42–7	6,889
September 15	6:00 p.m.	Tarleton State	Kimbrough Memorial Stadium; Canyon, TX	L 7–44	5,542
September 22	1:00 p.m.	at Western New Mexico	Altamirano Stadium; Silver City, NM	W 27–17	544
September 29	8:00 p.m.	at No. 14 Central Washington*	Tomlinson Stadium; Ellensburg, WA	W 28–26	5,209
October 6	6:00 p.m.	UT Permian Basin^{†}	Kimbrough Memorial Stadium; Canyon, TX	W 42–21	6,399
October 13	4:00 p.m.	at Angelo State	LeGrand Sports Complex; San Angelo, TX	W 26–18	2,698
October 20	6:00 p.m.	Eastern New Mexico	Kimbrough Memorial Stadium; Canyon, TX (Wagon Wheel)	L 0–28	8,279
October 27	4:00 p.m.	at No. 18 Texas A&M–Commerce	Memorial Stadium; Commerce, TX (East Texas vs. West Texas)	L 16–41	9,168
November 3	6:00 p.m.	Texas A&M–Kingsville	Kimbrough Memorial Stadium; Canyon, TX	W 35–31	6,137
November 10	1:00 p.m.	at No. 16 Midwestern State	Memorial Stadium; Wichita Falls	L 23–24 ^{OT}	7,862
*Non-conference game; ^{†}Homecoming; Rankings from AFCA Poll released prior to the game; All times are in Central time

Schedule source:

== Game summaries ==
=== At Azusa Pacific ===
	1	2	3	4	Total
Buffaloes	0	7	0	0	7
Cougars	7	7	3	0	17

Statistics	WT	APU
First downs	21	20
Total yards	305	357
Rushing yards	76	236
Passing yards	229	121
Turnovers	3	4
Time of possession	27:48	32:12

Team	Category	Player	Statistics
West Texas A&M	Passing	Mitch Hood	23/39, 229 yards, 2 INT
West Texas A&M	Rushing	Duke Carter IV	13 rushes, 46 yards
West Texas A&M	Receiving	Markel Steward	6 receptions, 85 yards
Azusa Pacific	Passing	Tyrone Williams Jr.	12/20, 121 yards, TD, 3 INT
Azusa Pacific	Rushing	Zikel Reddick	27 rushes, 201 yards, TD
Azusa Pacific	Receiving	Weston Carr	6 receptions, 74 yards

=== Oklahoma Panhandle State ===
	1	2	3	4	Total
Aggies	0	0	7	0	7
Buffaloes	14	14	14	0	42

Statistics	OPSU	WT
First downs	20	13
Total yards	283	285
Rushing yards	63	143
Passing yards	220	142
Turnovers	4	1
Time of possession	32:36	27:24

Team	Category	Player	Statistics
Oklahoma Panhandle State	Passing	John Polston	18/32, 153 yards, TD, 2 INT
Oklahoma Panhandle State	Rushing	Brandon Ramon	2 rushes, 15 yards
Oklahoma Panhandle State	Receiving	Nick West	4 receptions, 49 yards, TD
West Texas A&M	Passing	Mitch Hood	8/18, 142 yards, TD, INT
West Texas A&M	Rushing	Duke Carter IV	13 rushes, 84 yards, TD
West Texas A&M	Receiving	Payton Gonzales	1 reception, 61 yards, TD

=== Tarleton State ===
	1	2	3	4	Total
Texans	3	20	14	7	44
Buffaloes	0	7	0	0	7

Statistics	TSU	WT
First downs	21	11
Total yards	419	123
Rushing yards	225	31
Passing yards	194	92
Turnovers	0	4
Time of possession	34:24	25:36

Team	Category	Player	Statistics
Tarleton State	Passing	Ben Holmes	13/17, 194 yards
Tarleton State	Rushing	D'Anthony Hopkins	12 rushes, 61 yards, TD
Tarleton State	Receiving	DeShun Qualls	3 receptions, 82 yards
West Texas A&M	Passing	Justin Houghtaling	7/10, 71 yards, INT
West Texas A&M	Rushing	Duke Carter IV	22 rushes, 32 yards, TD
West Texas A&M	Receiving	Semaj Mitchell	6 receptions, 46 yards

=== At Western New Mexico ===
	1	2	3	4	Total
Buffaloes	7	10	3	7	27
Mustangs	0	3	7	7	17

Statistics	WT	WNMU
First downs	15	20
Total yards	250	426
Rushing yards	165	72
Passing yards	85	354
Turnovers	2	2
Time of possession	32:30	27:30

Team	Category	Player	Statistics
West Texas A&M	Passing	Mitch Hood	8/17, 85 yards, TD, INT
West Texas A&M	Rushing	Duke Carter IV	33 rushes, 150 yards, TD
West Texas A&M	Receiving	Jamaal Hamilton	1 reception, 31 yards
Western New Mexico	Passing	Blayne Armstrong	34/49, 354 yards, 2 TD, INT
Western New Mexico	Rushing	DeAndre Williams	21 rushes, 67 yards
Western New Mexico	Receiving	Kourde Roberts	8 receptions, 112 yards, 2 TD

=== At No. 14 Central Washington ===
	1	2	3	4	Total
Buffaloes	0	16	6	6	28
No. 14 Wildcats	0	7	12	7	26

Statistics	WT	CWU
First downs	16	26
Total yards	352	562
Rushing yards	268	126
Passing yards	84	436
Turnovers	0	2
Time of possession	30:05	29:55

Team	Category	Player	Statistics
West Texas A&M	Passing	Justin Houghtaling	11/18, 84 yards, 2 TD
West Texas A&M	Rushing	Duke Carter IV	35 rushes, 259 yards, TD
West Texas A&M	Receiving	Jordan Johnson	3 receptions, 36 yards, TD
Central Washington	Passing	Reilly Hennessey	31/49, 436 yards, 3 TD, INT
Central Washington	Rushing	Michael Roots	11 rushes, 56 yards
Central Washington	Receiving	Tony Archie	6 receptions, 106 yards, TD

=== UT Permian Basin ===
	1	2	3	4	Total
Falcons	7	14	0	0	21
Buffaloes	7	14	7	14	42

Statistics	UTPB	WT
First downs	11	21
Total yards	292	397
Rushing yards	98	180
Passing yards	194	187
Turnovers	0	0
Time of possession	24:40	35:20

Team	Category	Player	Statistics
UT Permian Basin	Passing	Taylor Null	12/28, 194 yards, 2 TD
UT Permian Basin	Rushing	Marquis Simmons	10 rushes, 44 yards
UT Permian Basin	Receiving	Kyle McBride	2 receptions, 125 yards, TD
West Texas A&M	Passing	Justin Houghtaling	17/21, 187 yards, TD
West Texas A&M	Rushing	Duke Carter IV	29 rushes, 143 yards, 4 TD
West Texas A&M	Receiving	Jordan Johnson	4 receptions, 70 yards, TD

=== At Angelo State ===
	1	2	3	4	Total
Buffaloes	0	3	16	7	26
Rams	7	0	3	8	18

Statistics	WT	ASU
First downs	17	19
Total yards	297	365
Rushing yards	59	151
Passing yards	238	214
Turnovers	0	2
Time of possession	37:10	20:42

Team	Category	Player	Statistics
West Texas A&M	Passing	Justin Houghtaling	22/32, 238 yards, TD
West Texas A&M	Rushing	Duke Carter IV	31 rushes, 58 yards
West Texas A&M	Receiving	Semaj Mitchell	7 receptions, 93 yards
Angelo State	Passing	Payne Sullins	17/25, 214 yards, TD, 2 INT
Angelo State	Rushing	Tyrese Nathan	18 rushes, 96 yards
Angelo State	Receiving	Tyrese Nathan	7 receptions, 73 yards, TD

=== Eastern New Mexico ===
	1	2	3	4	Total
Greyhounds	14	7	0	7	28
Buffaloes	0	0	0	0	0

Statistics	ENMU	WT
First downs	26	8
Total yards	489	134
Rushing yards	440	61
Passing yards	49	73
Turnovers	1	1
Time of possession	38:34	21:26

Team	Category	Player	Statistics
Eastern New Mexico	Passing	Roel Sanchez	1/1, 38 yards, TD
Eastern New Mexico	Rushing	Paul Terry	21 rushes, 134 yards
Eastern New Mexico	Receiving	Johnny Smith	1 reception, 38 yards, TD
West Texas A&M	Passing	Justin Houghtaling	9/21, 73 yards
West Texas A&M	Rushing	Duke Carter IV	9 rushes, 46 yards
West Texas A&M	Receiving	Payton Gonzales	4 receptions, 44 yards

=== At No. 18 Texas A&M–Commerce ===
	1	2	3	4	Total
Buffaloes	7	6	3	0	16
No. 18 Lions	7	10	17	7	41

Statistics	WT	TAMUC
First downs	12	16
Total yards	286	375
Rushing yards	22	244
Passing yards	264	131
Turnovers	3	0
Time of possession	27:46	32:14

Team	Category	Player	Statistics
West Texas A&M	Passing	Justin Houghtaling	21/32, 264 yards, INT
West Texas A&M	Rushing	Marshawn Brown	5 rushes, 29 yards, TD
West Texas A&M	Receiving	Payton Gonzales	4 receptions, 79 yards
Texas A&M–Commerce	Passing	Kane Wilson	12/15, 131 yards, TD
Texas A&M–Commerce	Rushing	Ovie Urevbu	20 rushes, 118 yards
Texas A&M–Commerce	Receiving	Ryan Stokes	3 receptions, 85 yards

=== Texas A&M–Kingsville ===
	1	2	3	4	Total
Javelinas	3	11	10	7	31
Buffaloes	7	7	14	7	35

Statistics	TAMUK	WT
First downs	26	10
Total yards	420	363
Rushing yards	106	257
Passing yards	314	106
Turnovers	2	0
Time of possession	39:49	20:08

Team	Category	Player	Statistics
Texas A&M–Kingsville	Passing	Koy Detmer Jr.	28/47, 314 yards, 3 TD, INT
Texas A&M–Kingsville	Rushing	Nick Pelrean	13 rushes, 74 yards
Texas A&M–Kingsville	Receiving	Tyler Wilson	9 receptions, 154 yards
West Texas A&M	Passing	Justin Houghtaling	6/15, 106 yards, TD
West Texas A&M	Rushing	Brandon Blair	16 rushes, 182 yards, 3 TD
West Texas A&M	Receiving	Semaj Mitchell	2 receptions, 83 yards

=== At No. 10 Midwestern State ===
	1	2	3	4	OT	Total
Buffaloes	7	0	0	10	6	23
No. 10 Mustangs	10	7	0	0	7	24

Statistics	WT	MSU
First downs	18	26
Total yards	282	477
Rushing yards	143	219
Passing yards	139	258
Turnovers	2	2
Time of possession	31:44	28:16

Team	Category	Player	Statistics
West Texas A&M	Passing	Justin Houghtaling	8/17, 73 yards, INT
West Texas A&M	Rushing	Brandon Blair	26 rushes, 96 yards, TD
West Texas A&M	Receiving	Payton Gonzales	4 receptions, 46 yards, TD
Midwestern State	Passing	Layton Rabb	20/35, 258 yards, TD, 2 INT
Midwestern State	Rushing	Vincent Johnson	23 rushes, 138 yards, TD
Midwestern State	Receiving	Juwan Johnson	6 receptions, 97 yards
