= Tarleton State Texans football =

College football program representing Tarleton State University

2026 Tarleton State Texans football team
- First season: 1904; 122 years ago
- Athletic director: Steve Uryasz
- Head coach: Todd Whitten; 17th season, 125–58 (.683)
- Location: Stephenville, Texas
- Stadium: Memorial Stadium (capacity: 24,000)
- NCAA division: Division I FCS
- Conference: UAC
- Colors: Purple and white
- All-time record: 348–327–3 (.515)

Conference championships
- TIAA: 1977, 1978, 1986, 1987, 1988, 1990 LSC: 2001, 2009, 2013, 2018, 2019 UAC: 2025, 2026

Division championships
- LSC South: 2001, 2006, 2009 LSC North: 2002, 2003
- Website: TarletonSports.com

The Tarleton State Texans football program, also known as the Tarleton Texans, is the intercollegiate American football team for Tarleton State University located in the U.S. state of Texas. Through the 2019 season, the team competed in NCAA Division II as members of the Lone Star Conference, but moved to the NCAA Division I Football Championship Subdivision (FCS) beginning in the 2020–21 NCAA Division I FCS football season. In fall 2021, Tarleton's full-time home of the Western Athletic Conference revived its football league at the FCS level, with Tarleton as one of the inaugural members.

The WAC and the ASUN Conference entered into a football-only partnership in the 2021 season, renewing it for 2022. Shortly after the 2022 season, the two conferences fully merged their football leagues into what eventually became the United Athletic Conference, with Tarleton as one of the new league's nine inaugural members.

Tarleton's first football team was fielded in 1904. The team plays its home games at the 24,000-seat Memorial Stadium in Stephenville, Texas. The Texans are coached by Todd Whitten.

== Championships ==
=== Conference championships ===
Season	Conference	Coach	Overall Record	Conference Record
1977	Texas Intercollegiate Athletic Association	Buddy Fornes	7–4	4–0
1978	Texas Intercollegiate Athletic Association	Buddy Fornes	8–1–1	7–0–1
1986	Texas Intercollegiate Athletic Association	Bill Pringle	9–1–1	6–0
1987	Texas Intercollegiate Athletic Association	Bill Pringle	9–3–1	6–0
1989	Texas Intercollegiate Athletic Association	Hal McAfee	9–3	8–2
1990	Texas Intercollegiate Athletic Association	Hal McAfee	11–1	6–0
2001†	Lone Star Conference	Todd Whitten	10–3	8–1
2009†	Lone Star Conference	Sam McElroy	10–3	7–2
2013†	Lone Star Conference	Cary Fowler	7–3	5–1
2018	Lone Star Conference	Todd Whitten	12–1	8–0
2019	Lone Star Conference	Todd Whitten	11–1	8–0
2025†	United Athletic Conference	Todd Whitten	12–2	7–1
2026	United Athletic Conference	Todd Whitten	12–0	7–0

† Denotes co-champions

=== Division championships ===
Season	Division	Coach	Overall Record	Conference Record
2001†	LSC South	Todd Whitten	10–3	8–1
2002	LSC North	Todd Whitten	9–2	6–2
2003	LSC North	Todd Whitten	8–4	6–2
2006†	LSC South	Sam McElroy	6–4	6–3
2009†	LSC South	Sam McElroy	10–3	7–2

† Co-championship

== Playoff appearances ==
=== NCAA Division I FCS ===
The Texans have made two appearances in the Division I FCS playoffs, with an overall record of 2–2.

Year	Round	Opponent	Result
2024	First Round; Second Round	Drake; South Dakota	W, 43–29; L, 31–42
2025	Second Round; Quarterfinals	North Dakota; Villanova	W, 31–13; L, 21–26

=== NCAA Division II ===
The Texans made five appearances in the NCAA Division II playoffs, with an overall record of 4–5.

Year	Round	Opponent	Result
2001	First Round; Quarterfinals	Chadron State; UC Davis	W, 28–24; L, 25–42
2003	First Round	Texas A&M–Kingsville	L, 10–34
2009	First Round; Second Round	Texas A&M–Kingsville; Central Washington	W, 57–56 ^{2OT} L, 6–27
2018	First Round; Second Round; Quarterfinals	Azusa Pacific; Texas A&M–Commerce; Minnesota State	W, 58–0; W, 34–28; L, 10–13
2019	First Round	Texas A&M–Commerce	L, 16–23

=== NAIA ===
Tarleton State made four appearances in the NAIA playoffs, with a combined record of 3–4.

Year	Round	Opponent	Result
1978	Quarterfinals	Findlay	L, 6–13
1987	First Round; Quarterfinals	Bethany (KS); Baker (KS)	W, 38–26; L, 12–13
1989	First Round; Quarterfinals	St. Mary of the Plains; Westminster (PA)	W, 16–6; L, 0–34
1990	First Round; Quarterfinals	St. Mary of the Plains; Westminster (PA)	W, 24–14; L, 17–19

== Notable former players ==
Notable alumni include:

Richard Bartel, QB: Dallas Cowboys, Cleveland Browns, Jacksonville Jaguars, Washington Redskins, Sacramento Mountain Lions, Arizona Cardinals. 2007-2012. Offensive coordinator: Atlanta Legends. 2019.

Marv Brown, HB: Detroit Lions. 1957.

Walter Bryan, DB: Baltimore Colts. 1955.

James Dearth, LS: Cleveland Browns, New York Jets, Washington Redskins, San Diego Chargers, New England Patriots. 1999-2011.

Saalim Hakim, WR: New Orleans Saints, New York Jets, Kansas City Chiefs. 2012-2015.

Rufus Johnson, DE: New Orleans Saints, New England Patriots, Washington Redskins, Oakland Raiders. 2013-2017.

Garrett Lindholm, K: Atlanta Falcons, Indianapolis Colts, Milwaukee Mustangs, St. Louis Rams, Arizona Rattlers, San Antonio Talons, New Orleans VooDoo, Orlando Predators, Los Angeles KISS. 2010-2016.

Tywain Myles, DT: Jacksonville Jaguars, Atlanta Falcons. 2008-2009.

Deshaun Phillips, CB: Dallas Cowboys, New York Jets, Washington Redskins, Pittsburgh Steelers, Dallas Renegades. 2014–Present.

Derrick Ross, FB: Kansas City Chiefs, Cologne Centurions, Montreal Alouettes, Winnipeg Blue Bombers, San Angelo Stampede Express, Dallas Vigilantes, Philadelphia Soul, Los Angeles KISS, Las Vegas Outlaws, Jacksonville Sharks. 2006-2017.

E.J. Speed, LB: Indianapolis Colts. 2019–Present.

Nick Stephens, QB: Tennessee Titans, Utah Blaze, Dallas Cowboys, Baltimore Ravens, San Jose SaberCats. 2012-2014.

Camp Wilson, FB: Detroit Lions. 1946-1949.

Randy Winkler, OT: Detroit Lions, Atlanta Falcons, Green Bay Packers. 1968-1971.

Koe Wetzel, LB: American singer/songwriter

== Future non-conference opponents ==
Announced schedules as of March 9, 2026.

2026	2027
Prairie View A&M	at North Texas
at Bowling Green	McNeese
at McNeese	at Prairie View A&M
Merrimack	
Chicago State	
