= 2018 Texas A&M–Commerce Lions football team =

American college football season

2018 Texas A&M–Commerce Lions football

NCAA Division II second round, L 28–34 vs. Tarleton State
- Conference: Lone Star Conference
- Record: 10–3 (7–1 LSC)
- Head coach: Colby Carthel (6th season)
- Offensive coordinator: Matt Storm (6th season)
- Offensive scheme: Spread
- Defensive coordinator: Scott Power (1st season)
- Base defense: 3–4
- Home stadium: Memorial Stadium

2018 Lone Star Conference football standings
	Conf.			Overall
Team	W		L	W		L
No. 5 Tarleton State $^	8	–	0	12	–	1
No. 9 Texas A&M–Commerce ^	7	–	1	10	–	3
No. 25 Midwestern State	6	–	2	8	–	2
Angelo State #	4	–	4	6	–	6
West Texas A&M	4	–	4	6	–	5
Eastern New Mexico	4	–	4	5	–	6
Texas A&M–Kingsville	2	–	6	4	–	7
UT Permian Basin	1	–	7	2	–	9
Western New Mexico	0	–	8	0	–	10
$ – Conference champion; ^ – NCAA Division II playoff participant; # – C.H.A.M.P.S. Heart of Texas Bowl participant; Rankings from AFCA poll

The 2018 Texas A&M–Commerce Lions football team represented Texas A&M University–Commerce in the 2018 NCAA Division II football season. They were led by head coach Colby Carthel, who was in his sixth season at Texas A&M–Commerce. The Lions played their home games at Memorial Stadium and were members of the Lone Star Conference.

The Lions finished the regular season with a record of 9–2 and second place in the conference. The team made the NCAA Division II playoffs, losing in the regional semifinal to Tarleton State.

== Schedule ==
The schedule consisted of six home games and five away games in the regular season.

Date	Time	Opponent	Rank	Site	TV	Result	Attendance
August 30	7:00 p.m	Texas A&M–Kingsville	No. 1	Memorial Stadium; Commerce, TX (Chennault Cup)	ESPN3	W 37–36 ^{2OT}	7,141
September 8	12:00 p.m.	at William Jewell*	No. 1	Greene Stadium; Liberty, MO		W 27–17	650
September 15	8:00 p.m.	at Eastern New Mexico	No. 1	Greyhound Stadium; Portales, NM		W 21–11	1,601
September 22	6:00 p.m.	No. 22 CSU Pueblo*	No. 1	Memorial Stadium; Commerce, TX		L 13–23	6,737
September 29	6:00 p.m.	Lock Haven*	No. 9	Memorial Stadium; Commerce, TX		W 68–6	8,488
October 7 (Note: Kickoff was at 7:00 p.m. the night before at Memorial Stadium in Wichita Falls, TX. The game was suspended at halftime tied 10–10 due to inclement weather. The second half of the game resumed the following day at the neutral site of Apogee Stadium in Denton.)	2:00 p.m.	vs. No. 4 Midwestern State	No. 9	Apogee Stadium; Denton, TX		W 20–19	8,122
October 13	4:00 p.m.	No. 16 Tarleton State	No. 7	Memorial Stadium; Commerce, TX (President's Cup)		L 21–47	6,875
October 20	1:00 p.m.	at Western New Mexico	No. 18	Ben Altamirano Field; Silver City, NM		W 55–7	0
October 27	4:00 p.m.	West Texas A&M^{†}	No. 18	Memorial Stadium; Commerce, TX (East Texas vs. West Texas)		W 41–16	9,168
November 3	6:00 p.m.	at Texas–Permian Basin	No. 16	Ratliff Stadium; Odessa, TX		W 20–17	3,958
November 10	4:00 p.m.	Angelo State	No. 14	Memorial Stadium; Commerce, TX		W 41–13	6,887
November 17	1:00 p.m.	at No. 5 Minnesota–Duluth*	No. 15	Griggs Field at James S. Malosky Stadium; Duluth, MN (Regional Quarterfinal)		W 33–17	1,029
November 24	1:00 p.m.	at No. 6 Tarleton State*	No. 15	Memorial Stadium; Stephenville, TX (Regional semifinal)		L 28–34	5,231
*Non-conference game; ^{†}Homecoming; Rankings from American Football Coaches Association Poll released prior to the game

== Roster ==
2018 Texas A&M–Commerce Football Roster
Quarterbacks: 7 Kane Wilson – junior (6'4, 230); 14 Gunnar Palacios – (redshirt) freshman (6'0, 190); 18 Chase Pemberton – senior (6'4, 190); 19 Preston Wheeler – (redshirt) junior (6'3, 181); 23 Mason Ray – (redshirt) freshman (6'3, 210); Running backs: 26 Carandal Hale – (redshirt) sophomore (5'11, 190); 32 Nate Davis – (redshirt) freshman (5'9, 180); 35 Ovie Urevbu – (redshirt) senior (5'11, 210); 38 E.J. Thompson – sophomore (5'9, 200); 46 Antonio Leali'ie'e – (redshirt) sophomore (5'11, 210); Wide receivers: 2 Marquis Wimberly – senior (6'2, 205); 3 Darrion Landry – senior (6'3, 200); 17 Ryan Stokes – junior (6'3, 185); 29 Michael Coley – junior (6'2, 200); 81 Arnezz Archie – (redshirt) freshman (6'1, 170); 83 Kelan Smith – (redshirt) sophomore (6'1, 170); 84 Deonta Adams – (redshirt) freshman (6'1, 170); 85 Chance Cooper – sophomore (6'3, 200); 86 Dequan Dudley – junior (5'10, 160); 87 Lorenzo Rosario – senior (6'3, 200); 88 Matt Childers – (redshirt) freshman (6'4, 180); Tight ends: 11 Tyler Guice – junior (6'3, 250); 15 Vincent Hobbs – senior (6'3, 255); 40 Drake Flores – (redshirt) sophomore (6'3, 240); 80 Dom Velasquez – (redshirt) freshman (6'4, 240); Long snapper: 82 Wyatt Leath – sophomore (6'4, 245)	Offensive linemen: 53 Christian Hernandez – (redshirt) sophomore (6'1, 265); 61 Ty Cole – (redshirt) sophomore (6'4, 290); 62 Nic Smith – (redshirt) freshman (6'5, 275); 63 Solomon Ndukwe – (redshirt) freshman (6'3, 300); 64 Travis Dafft – (redshirt) freshman (6'1, 255); 65 Jonah Brown – (redshirt) junior (6'5, 315); 66 Emerald Faletuipapai – junior (6'7, 350); 67 Jackson Richmond – (redshirt) freshman (6'4, 305); 68 Kendall Mathis – (redshirt) sophomore (6'3, 300); 70 Abdul Shammaa – (redshirt) junior (6'5, 310); 71 Malik Ellis – senior (6'6, 280); 72 Brian Taylor – (redshirt) junior (6'2, 275); 73 Ryan Peschka – (redshirt) junior (6'2, 290); 74 Richard West – (redshirt) freshman (6'6, 240); 75 Coleton Lasseter – (redshirt) sophomore (6'3, 225); 76 Amon Simon – (redshirt) sophomore (6'5, 275); 77 Jordan Smith – senior (6'4, 315); 78 Daronte Shaw – senior (6'5, 320); 79 Matt Mora – (redshirt) sophomore (6'7, 300); Defensive linemen: 13 Josh Reynolds – senior (6'4, 210); 48 Vili Paea – junior (6'3, 260); 49 D.D. Fletcher – (redshirt) junior (6'1, 270); 51 Ty Reed – (redshirt) freshman (6'2, 220); 52 Peyton Searcy – senior (6'0, 275); 55 Pierre Leonard – junior (5'10, 300); 56 Montre Bonner – junior (6'3, 230); 69 Devin Beamon – freshman (6'1, 290); 90 David Brazil – junior (6'0, 230); 91 Elijah Earls – (redshirt) sophomore (6'0, 240); 92 J.R. Rocha – (redshirt) freshman (6'0, 270); 93 Jaylon Hodge – (redshirt) sophomore (6'0, 275); 94 Brandon Bascue – (redshirt) freshman (6'4, 260); 95 Dequan Wilson – junior (6'5, 250); 96 Dylan Davis – (redshirt) freshman (6'3, 215); 97 Nick Petitti – (redshirt) freshman (6'4, 220); 98 Deionte Haywood – senior (6'3, 225); 99 Michael Onuoha – senior (6'5, 255)	Linebackers: 28 Mark Westbrook – junior (5'11, 195); 31 Jay Bias – (redshirt) sophomore (5'9, 190); 33 Neema Behbahani – (redshirt) junior (6'1, 230); 36 Tristen Slaughter – senior (6'2, 210); 39 Joe Butler – junior (6'4, 215); 43 Jaquorius Smith – (redshirt) sophomore (5'9, 195); 44 Dayne Douglass – sophomore (6'2, 220); 45 Jordan Johnson – freshman (6'3, 205); 47 Bryse Burris – (redshirt) freshman (6'3, 205); 50 Xavier Morris – (redshirt) sophomore (6'1, 220); 54 Garrett Blubaugh – senior (6'2, 230); Defensive backs: 1 L.A. Dawson – junior (6'0, 180); 4 Jalon Edwards-Cooper – (redshirt) junior (5'11, 175); 5 Felipe Chambers – junior (6'1, 190); 6 Danny Huckaby – senior (6'1, 180); 8 Kader Kohou – (redshirt) sophomore (5'9, 190); 10 Alex Shillow – (redshirt) sophomore (5'10, 185); 20 Dominique Ramsey – (redshirt) sophomore (5'9, 180); 21 Davion Bradley – freshman (6'0, 175); 22 Darent White – senior (6'1, 160); 24 Chris Smith – senior (6'1, 170); 25 Reggie Kincade – senior (5'11, 170); 27 Darius Williams – (redshirt) freshman (5'9, 165); 41 Rashad Fisher – (redshirt) sophomore (5'10, 180); Placekickers: 59 Jake Viquez – (redshirt) sophomore (5'10, 190); 60 Andrew Gomez – sophomore (6'2, 210); 89 Kristov Martinez – senior (5'6, 135); Punters: 37 Tristan Perry – sophomore (6'1, 200); 59 Jake Viquez – (redshirt) sophomore (5'10, 190)

== Game summaries ==
=== Texas A&M–Kingsville ===
	1	2	3	4	OT	2OT	Total
Javelinas	0	13	10	0	7	6	36
No. 1 Lions	0	0	13	10	7	7	37

Statistics

Statistics	TAMUK	TAMUC
First downs	20	24
Total yards	414	396
Rushing yards	94	94
Passing yards	320	302
Turnovers	2	3
Time of possession	35:05	24:55

Team	Category	Player	Statistics
Texas A&M–Kingsville	Passing	Koy Detmer, Jr.	33/46, 320 yards, 4 TD, 2 INT
Texas A&M–Kingsville	Rushing	Jeff Carr	9 rushes, 33 yards
Texas A&M–Kingsville	Receiving	Ty Chisum	5 receptions, 82 yards, 2 TD
Texas A&M–Commerce	Passing	Preston Wheeler	23/48, 302 yards, 3 TD, INT
Texas A&M–Commerce	Rushing	Ovie Urevbu	14 rushes, 62 yards
Texas A&M–Commerce	Receiving	Marquis Wimberly	8 receptions, 99 yards, TD

=== At William Jewell ===
	1	2	3	4	Total
No. 1 Lions	14	10	3	0	27
Cardinals	0	7	3	7	17

Statistics

Statistics	TAMUC	WJC
First downs	19	19
Total yards	346	249
Rushing yards	122	93
Passing yards	224	156
Turnovers	3	1
Time of possession	26:10	33:50

Team	Category	Player	Statistics
Texas A&M–Commerce	Passing	Preston Wheeler	25/31, 181 yards, TD, 2 INT
Texas A&M–Commerce	Rushing	Carandal Hale	16 rushes, 81 yards, TD
Texas A&M–Commerce	Receiving	Chance Cooper	8 receptions, 103 yards
William Jewell	Passing	Will Schneider	19/33, 156 yards, TD
William Jewell	Rushing	Will Schneider	20 rushes, 79 yards, TD
William Jewell	Receiving	Bulla Graft	7 receptions, 69 yards, TD

=== At Eastern New Mexico ===
	1	2	3	4	Total
No. 1 Lions	14	0	0	7	21
Greyhounds	0	3	0	8	11

Statistics

Statistics	TAMUC	ENMU
First downs	14	14
Total yards	289	215
Rushing yards	186	209
Passing yards	103	6
Turnovers	1	2
Time of possession	22:42	37:18

Team	Category	Player	Statistics
Texas A&M–Commerce	Passing	Preston Wheeler	11/30, 103 yards, INT
Texas A&M–Commerce	Rushing	Carandal Hale	14 rushes, 101 yards, TD
Texas A&M–Commerce	Receiving	Marquis Wimberly	1 reception, 30 yards
Eastern New Mexico	Passing	Wyatt Strand	2/7, 6 yards, INT
Eastern New Mexico	Rushing	Paul Terry	24 rushes, 88 yards, TD
Eastern New Mexico	Receiving	Russell Montoya	1 reception, 4 yards

=== Colorado State–Pueblo ===
	1	2	3	4	Total
No. 22 ThunderWolves	0	6	10	7	23
No. 1 Lions	10	0	0	3	13

Statistics

Statistics	CSUP	TAMUC
First downs	15	9
Total yards	299	179
Rushing yards	215	40
Passing yards	84	139
Turnovers	2	5
Time of possession	36:30	23:20

Team	Category	Player	Statistics
Colorado State–Pueblo	Passing	Brandon Edwards	11/28, 84 yards
Colorado State–Pueblo	Rushing	Marche Dennard	17 rushes, 72 yards
Colorado State–Pueblo	Receiving	John Todd	3 receptions, 29 yards
Texas A&M–Commerce	Passing	Kane Wilson	7/15, 108 yards, INT
Texas A&M–Commerce	Rushing	E.J. Thompson	15 rushes, 48 yards
Texas A&M–Commerce	Receiving	Ryan Stokes	4 receptions, 60 yards

=== Lock Haven ===
	1	2	3	4	Total
Bald Eagles	0	0	6	0	6
No. 9 Lions	14	24	16	14	68

Statistics

Statistics	LHU	TAMUC
First downs	12	26
Total yards	268	612
Rushing yards	52	121
Passing yards	216	491
Turnovers	0	1
Time of possession	31:16	28:44

Team	Category	Player	Statistics
Lock Haven	Passing	Cameron Tobias	22/42, 205 yards, TD
Lock Haven	Rushing	Chantz Swartz	9 rushes, 19 yards
Lock Haven	Receiving	Jalen Jackson	9 receptions, 81 yards
Texas A&M–Commerce	Passing	Kane Wilson	20/31, 373 yards, 4 TD
Texas A&M–Commerce	Rushing	Nate Davis	4 rushes, 62 yards, TD
Texas A&M–Commerce	Receiving	Marquis Wimberly	9 receptions, 195 yards, 2 TD

=== Vs. Midwestern State ===
	1	2	3	4	Total
No. 9 Lions	10	0	3	7	20
No. 4 Mustangs	7	3	7	2	19

Statistics

Statistics	TAMUC	MSU
First downs	24	27
Total yards	420	426
Rushing yards	190	192
Passing yards	230	234
Turnovers	3	1
Time of possession	29:32	30:28

Team	Category	Player	Statistics
Texas A&M–Commerce	Passing	Kane Wilson	17/28, 230 yards, TD, 2 INT
Texas A&M–Commerce	Rushing	E.J. Thompson	26 rushes, 150 yards
Texas A&M–Commerce	Receiving	Ryan Stokes	7 receptions, 93 yards, TD
Midwestern State	Passing	Layton Rabb	22/47, 234 yards, INT
Midwestern State	Rushing	Vincent Johnson	17 rushes, 108 yards, TD
Midwestern State	Receiving	Juwan Johnson	6 receptions, 106 yards

=== Tarleton State ===
	1	2	3	4	Total
No. 16 Texans	10	14	3	20	47
No. 7 Lions	7	7	7	0	21

Statistics

Statistics	TSU	TAMUC
First downs	28	17
Total yards	485	363
Rushing yards	282	131
Passing yards	203	232
Turnovers	0	2
Time of possession	29:20	30:40

Team	Category	Player	Statistics
Tarleton State	Passing	Ben Holmes	16/31, 203 yards, 3 TD
Tarleton State	Rushing	Xavier Turner	26 rushes, 166 yards, 2 TD
Tarleton State	Receiving	Savon Rollison	3 receptions, 78 yards, TD
Texas A&M–Commerce	Passing	Kane Wilson	18/31, 232 yards, TD
Texas A&M–Commerce	Rushing	Carandal Hale	13 rushes, 61 yards
Texas A&M–Commerce	Receiving	Ryan Stokes	3 receptions, 73 yards

=== At Western New Mexico ===
	1	2	3	4	Total
No. 18 Lions	0	34	14	7	55
Mustangs	0	7	0	0	7

Statistics

Statistics	TAMUC	WNMU
First downs	20	14
Total yards	349	263
Rushing yards	143	157
Passing yards	206	106
Turnovers	2	3
Time of possession	26:54	33:06

Team	Category	Player	Statistics
Texas A&M–Commerce	Passing	Kane Wilson	12/21, 136 yards, 2 TD, INT
Texas A&M–Commerce	Rushing	Nate Davis	14 rushes, 55 yards, TD
Texas A&M–Commerce	Receiving	Marquis Wimberly	6 receptions, 97 yards, 2 TD
Western New Mexico	Passing	Gabriel Tomaszewski	6/15, 56 yards, 2 INT
Western New Mexico	Rushing	Arkemus Baskerville	10 rushes, 74 yards
Western New Mexico	Receiving	Kourde Roberts	3 receptions, 41 yards

=== West Texas A&M ===
	1	2	3	4	Total
Buffaloes	7	6	3	0	16
No. 18 Lions	7	10	17	7	41

Statistics	WT	TAMUC
First downs	12	16
Total yards	286	375
Rushing yards	22	244
Passing yards	264	131
Turnovers	3	0
Time of possession	27:46	32:14

Team	Category	Player	Statistics
West Texas A&M	Passing	Justin Houghtaling	21/32, 264 yards, INT
West Texas A&M	Rushing	Marshawn Brown	5 rushes, 29 yards, TD
West Texas A&M	Receiving	Payton Gonzales	4 receptions, 79 yards
Texas A&M–Commerce	Passing	Kane Wilson	12/15, 131 yards, TD
Texas A&M–Commerce	Rushing	Ovie Urevbu	20 rushes, 118 yards
Texas A&M–Commerce	Receiving	Ryan Stokes	3 receptions, 85 yards

=== At Texas–Permian Basin ===
	1	2	3	4	Total
No. 16 Lions	10	3	0	7	20
Falcons	7	7	0	0	14

Statistics

Statistics	TAMUC	UTPB
First downs	18	10
Total yards	400	137
Rushing yards	195	-69
Passing yards	205	206
Turnovers	2	1
Time of possession	34:56	25:04

Team	Category	Player	Statistics
Texas A&M–Commerce	Passing	Kane Wilson	19/29, 205 yards
Texas A&M–Commerce	Rushing	Ovie Urevbu	27 rushes, 195 yards
Texas A&M–Commerce	Receiving	Kelan Smith	8 receptions, 93 yards
Texas–Permian Basin	Passing	Taylor Null	18/34, 179 yards, 2 TD
Texas–Permian Basin	Rushing	Leroy Giles	4 rushes, 4 yards
Texas–Permian Basin	Receiving	Kristian Brown	4 receptions, 86 yards, TD

=== Angelo State ===
	1	2	3	4	Total
Rams	13	0	0	0	13
No. 14 Lions	14	13	14	0	41

Statistics

Statistics	ASU	TAMUC
First downs	8	21
Total yards	243	451
Rushing yards	80	230
Passing yards	163	221
Turnovers	1	2
Time of possession	25:40	34:20

Team	Category	Player	Statistics
Angelo State	Passing	Payne Sullins	14/37, 163 yards, INT
Angelo State	Rushing	Tony Jones	7 receptions, 42 yards
Angelo State	Receiving	Lawson Ayo	5 receptions, 83 yards
Texas A&M–Commerce	Passing	Kane Wilson	16/28, 221 yards, 2 TD, 2 INT
Texas A&M–Commerce	Rushing	Ovie Urevbu	30 rushes, 184 yards, 2 TD
Texas A&M–Commerce	Receiving	Vincent Hobbs	3 receptions, 63 yards, TD

=== At Minnesota–Dululth (Regional Quarterfinal) ===
	1	2	3	4	Total
No. 15 Lions	10	7	7	9	33
No. 5 Bulldogs	0	14	0	3	17

Statistics

Statistics	TAMUC	UMD
First downs	13	13
Total yards	276	188
Rushing yards	63	42
Passing yards	213	146
Turnovers	2	2
Time of possession	28:43	31:17

Team	Category	Player	Statistics
Texas A&M–Commerce	Passing	Kane Wilson	14/31, 213 yards, TD, 2 INT
Texas A&M–Commerce	Rushing	Ovie Urevbu	27 rushes, 65 yards, TD
Texas A&M–Commerce	Receiving	Ryan Stokes	5 receptions, 100 yards
Minnesota–Duluth	Passing	Ben Everhart	10/20, 79 yards, INT
Minnesota–Duluth	Rushing	Mike Rybarczyk	12 rushes, 21 yards
Minnesota–Duluth	Receiving	Obi Ibeneme	3 receptions, 48 yards

=== At Tarleton State (Regional semifinal) ===
	1	2	3	4	Total
No. 15 Lions	3	6	6	13	28
No. 6 Texans	0	17	10	7	34

Statistics

Statistics	TAMUC	TSU
First downs	21	19
Total yards	386	556
Rushing yards	-2	350
Passing yards	388	206
Turnovers	3	4
Time of possession	30:30	29:30

Team	Category	Player	Statistics
Texas A&M–Commerce	Passing	Kane Wilson	25/60, 388 yards, TD, INT
Texas A&M–Commerce	Rushing	Ovie Urevbu	9 rushes, 15 yards
Texas A&M–Commerce	Receiving	Marquis Wimberly	7 receptions, 139 yards
Tarleton State	Passing	Ben Holmes	10/21, 206 yards, TD, 2 INT
Tarleton State	Rushing	Daniel McCants	19 rushes, 181 yards, 2 TD
Tarleton State	Receiving	DeShun Qualls	3 receptions, 91 yards, TD

== Rankings ==
Ranking movements Legend: ██ Increase in ranking ██ Decrease in ranking
	Week													
Poll	Pre	1	2	3	4	5	6	7	8	9	10	11	12	Final
AFCA	1	1	1	1	9	9	7	18	18	16	14	14	15	9
