= Todd Whitten =

American football player and coach (born 1965)

Tarleton State Texans
- Title: Head coach

Personal information
- Born: February 16, 1965 (age 61); Dallas, Texas, U.S.
- Listed height: 6 ft 2 in (1.88 m)
- Listed weight: 240 lb (109 kg)

Career information
- High school: Kimball
- College: Stephen F. Austin
- NFL draft: 1987: undrafted

Career history

Playing
- New England Patriots (1987)

Coaching
- Texas Tech (1988–1989) Graduate assistant; New Mexico State (1990–1993) Quarterbacks coach; UTEP (1994–1995) Running backs coach; Tarleton State (1996) Head coach; Wyoming (1997) Offensive coordinator & quarterbacks coach; Sam Houston State (1999) Offensive coordinator; Tarleton State (2000–2004) Head coach; Sam Houston State (2005–2009) Head coach; Lamar (2010–2011) Offensive coordinator; Arlington Heights HS (TX) (2012) Head coach; UTEP (2013–2015) Wide receivers coach; Tarleton State (2016–present) Head coach

Awards and highlights
- 4× LSC Coach of the Year (1996, 2001–2003)

Head coaching record
- Career: 163–87 (college); 0–1 (bowl); 2–2 (NCAA D-I playoffs); 3–4 (NCAA D-II playoffs); 3–6 (high school)
- Stats at Pro Football Reference

Philip Todd Whitten (born February 16, 1965) is an American football coach and former player. He is the head football coach at Tarleton State University, a position he held in 1996, from 2000 to 2004, and resumed before the 2016 season. Whitten was head football coach at Sam Houston State University from 2005 to 2009.

== Playing career ==
A native of Dallas, Texas, Whitten attended Justin F. Kimball High School. In 1982, he guided the school to a district championship. Whitten chose to attend Stephen F. Austin University, where he was a three-year starter in football and baseball from 1984 to 1986.

Whitten earned All-Gulf Star Conference as quarterback for the Lumberjacks. He ranks second in SFA career passing yards (6,304) and touchdown passes (60). He was drafted in baseball by the Philadelphia Phillies in 1983 and signed a free agent contract with the New England Patriots in 1987. He received his bachelor's degree in education from Stephen F. Austin in 1987 and his master’s in education from Texas Tech in 1990. Whitten was inducted into the SFA Athletics Hall of Fame in 2001.

== Coaching career ==
Following his one-year stint with the Patriots, Whitten began his coaching career as a graduate assistant coach at Texas Tech, working with the quarterbacks during the 1988 and 1989 seasons. He then became quarterbacks coach at New Mexico State University under head coach Jim Hess. In 1994, Whitten was hired by Charlie Bailey to coach the running backs at UTEP.

In 1996, Whitten got his first head coaching job as he took over at Tarleton State University. After a turn-around season that earned him Lone Star Conference Coach of the Year honors, Whitten left to become offensive coordinator for head coach Dana Dimel at the University of Wyoming. In 1999, he became offensive coordinator at Sam Houston State, before leaving again for Tarleton State.

Between 2000 and 2004, Whitten coached Tarleton State to a 45–23 overall record, including a Lone Star Conference championship in 2001; and 2002, 2003 North Division championships. While at Tarleton, Whitten garnered Coach of the Year honors four times, as well as in 2001 being named d2football.com West Region Coach of the Year. In addition he set 30 school records, coached 13 All-Americans, 80 all-conference players, and led the Texans to their first ever playoff appearances in 2001 and 2003. Whitten is the winningest coach in the school's senior college era. In 2005, he accepted an offer by Sam Houston State to succeed longtime coach Ron Randleman. While at Sam Houston, Whitten produced the school's first back to back 1,000 yards rusher in 2006 and 2007, finished the 2008 season ranked sixth nationally in total offense, directed the University's all-time leader in both passing and total offense (Rhett Bomar), coached eight All-Americans and 63 all-conference players. Whitten coached SHSU to a 25–28 record in five seasons.

Whitten was hired on March 15, 2010, as the offensive coordinator for Division I Lamar University. In the Cardinal's first season in twenty-one years, Whitten coached the school's first back to back 400 yard passer, and helped lead Lamar to an overall record of 5–6. In the Cardinal's second year under Whitten, school records were set in team passing yards, individual total offense in a game, individual passing yards in a game, completions in a game, and individual receiving yards in game.

In 2012, Whitten served as the head football coach at Arlington Heights High School in Fort Worth, Texas. He left the school after one season to become the wide receivers coach at the University of Texas at El Paso.

Whitten was named head football coach at Tarleton State for the third time, on December 3, 2015 by athletic director Lonn Reisman.

In 2020, Tarleton State moved from Division II to Division I FCS. On February 21, 2021, Whitten coached the Texans to its first win as a FCS member against the New Mexico State Aggies, 43–17 who is in the FBS.

On August 29, 2025, Whitten coached the Texans to a 30–27 overtime win on the road over Army, getting the program's second all-time win over an FBS team.

== Head coaching record ==
=== College ===
Year	Team	Overall	Conference	Standing	Bowl/playoffs	STATS^{#}	Coaches^{°}
Tarleton State Texans (Lone Star Conference) (1996)
1996	Tarleton State	5–5	2–5	6th			
Tarleton State Texans (Lone Star Conference) (2000–2004)
2000	Tarleton State	6–5	5–4 / 3–3	6th / T–3rd (South)			
2001	Tarleton State	10–3	8–1 / 5–1	T–1st / T–1st (South)	L NCAA Division II Quarterfinal		17
2002	Tarleton State	9–2	6–2 / 4–1	T–2nd / 1st (North)			17
2003	Tarleton State	8–4	6–2 / 4–1	T–2nd / 1st (North)	L NCAA Division II First Round		21
2004	Tarleton State	7–4	6–3 / 3–2	5th / 3rd (North)			
Sam Houston State Bearkats (Southland Conference) (2005–2009)
2005	Sam Houston State	3–7	2–4	T–5th			
2006	Sam Houston State	6–5	4–2	T–2nd			
2007	Sam Houston State	7–4	5–2	T–2nd			
2008	Sam Houston State	4–6	2–5	T–6th			
2009	Sam Houston State	5–6	3–4	5th			
Sam Houston State:		25–28	16–17				
Tarleton State Texans (Lone Star Conference) (2016–2019)
2016	Tarleton State	5–6	5–4	T–5th			
2017	Tarleton State	6–6	4–4	T–4th	L Corsicana Bowl		
2018	Tarleton State	12–1	8–0	1st	L NCAA Division II Quarterfinal		7
2019	Tarleton State	11–1	8–0	1st	L NCAA Division II First Round		3
Tarleton State Texans (NCAA Division I FCS Independent) (2020)
2020–21	Tarleton State	5–3					
Tarleton State Texans (Western Athletic Conference) (2021–2022)
2021	Tarleton State	6–5	2–3	4th			
2022	Tarleton State	6–5	1–3	T–4th			
Tarleton State Texans (United Athletic Conference) (2023–present)
2023	Tarleton State	8–3	4–2	T–2nd			
2024	Tarleton State	10–4	6–2	T–2nd	L NCAA Division I Second Round	13	12
2025	Tarleton State	12–2	7–1	T–1st	L NCAA Division I Quarterfinal	6	6
2026	Tarleton State	12–0	7–0	1st			
Tarleton State:		138–59	85–36				
Total:		163–87					
National championship Conference title Conference division title or championship game berth
