= List of NCAA Division I ice hockey programs =

Men's NCAA Division I hockey programs as of 2024

Women's NCAA Division I hockey programs as of 2012

The following is a list of the 63 schools that fielded men's ice hockey teams in NCAA Division I in the most recent 2026–27 season, plus the 45 schools that fielded women's teams in the de facto equivalent of Division I, the NCAA's National Collegiate division. (Note: The NCAA formally brands championships open to teams from more than one division as "National Collegiate" championships. Men's hockey is an exception to this rule because the NCAA had once sponsored a separate Division II championship in that sport.)

Conference affiliations reflect those in place for the current 2026–27 season.

== Men ==
Returning	Departing	Joining

School	Team	City	State	Current Conference	Primary Conference	First Played	Joined Div I^{A}	NCAA Tourneys (Qty)	NCAA Tourneys (Years)	National Champs (Qty)	National Champs (Years)
United States Air Force Academy	Falcons	USAF Academy (Note: Virtually all of the Air Force Academy grounds, including the cadet area and all athletic facilities, lies outside the city limits of Colorado Springs. The U.S. Census Bureau and U.S. Postal Service respectively designate the Academy as "Air Force Academy" and "USAF Academy".)	Colorado	AHA	Mountain West	1968	1968	7	2007, 2008, 2009, 2011, 2012, 2017, 2018	0	
University of Alaska Fairbanks	Nanooks	Fairbanks	Alaska	Independent	GNAC (D-II)	1925	1947	1	2009	0	
University of Alaska Anchorage	Seawolves	Anchorage	Alaska	Independent	GNAC (D-II)	1979	2022 (Note: Alaska Anchorage last played hockey in the 2019–20 season. UAA intended to play in 2020–21, but canceled its season due to COVID-19 issues, and dropped the sport due to financial fallout from the pandemic. A subsequent fundraising drive was successful enough to lead UAA to reinstate hockey, with play resuming for the 2022–23 season.)	3	1990, 1991, 1992	0	
Arizona State University	Sun Devils	Tempe	Arizona	NCHC	Big 12	2015	2016	1	2019	0	
United States Military Academy	Black Knights	West Point	New York	AHA	Patriot League	1903	1947	0		0	
Augustana University	Vikings	Sioux Falls	South Dakota	CCHA	NSIC (D-II)	2023	2023	0		0	
Bemidji State University	Beavers	Bemidji	Minnesota	CCHA	NSIC (D-II)	1946	1999^{B}	5	2005, 2006, 2009, 2010, 2021	0	^{C}
Bentley University	Falcons	Waltham	Massachusetts	AHA	NE-10 (D-II)	1977	1999	1	2025	0	
Boston College	Eagles	Chestnut Hill	Massachusetts	Hockey East	ACC	1917	1947	38	1948, 1949, 1950, 1954, 1956, 1959, 1963, 1965, 1968, 1973, 1978, 1984, 1985, 1986, 1987, 1989, 1990, 1991, 1998, 1999, 2000, 2001, 2003, 2004, 2005, 2006, 2007, 2008, 2010, 2011, 2012, 2013, 2014, 2015, 2016, 2021, 2024, 2025	5	1949, 2001, 2008, 2010, 2012
Boston University	Terriers	Boston	Massachusetts	Hockey East	Patriot League	1917	1947	40	1950, 1951, 1953, 1960, 1966, 1967, 1971, 1972, 1974, 1975, 1976, 1977, 1978, 1984, 1986, 1990, 1991, 1992, 1993, 1994, 1995, 1996, 1997, 1998, 2000, 2002, 2003, 2005, 2006, 2007, 2009, 2012, 2015, 2016, 2017, 2018, 2021, 2023, 2024, 2025	5	1971, 1972, 1978, 1995, 2009
Bowling Green State University	Falcons	Bowling Green	Ohio	CCHA	MAC	1969	1971	10	1977, 1978, 1979, 1982, 1984, 1987, 1988, 1989, 1990, 2019	1	1984
Brown University	Bears	Providence	Rhode Island	ECAC	Ivy League	1897	1947	4	1951, 1965, 1976, 1993	0	
Canisius University	Golden Griffins	Buffalo	New York	AHA	Metro	1980	1998,	2	2013, 2023	0	
Clarkson University	Golden Knights	Potsdam	New York	ECAC	Liberty (D-III)	1920	1947	21	1957, 1958, 1962, 1963, 1966, 1970, 1981, 1982, 1984, 1991, 1992, 1993, 1995, 1996, 1997, 1998, 1999, 2007, 2008, 2018, 2019	0	
Colgate University	Raiders	Hamilton	New York	ECAC	Patriot League	1915	1947	6	1981, 1990, 2000, 2005, 2014, 2023	0	
Colorado College	Tigers	Colorado Springs	Colorado	NCHC	SCAC (D-III)	1937	1947	20	1948, 1949, 1950, 1951, 1952, 1955, 1957, 1978, 1995, 1996, 1997, 1998, 1999, 2001, 2002, 2003, 2005, 2006, 2008, 2011	2	1950, 1957
University of Connecticut	Huskies	Storrs	Connecticut	Hockey East	Big East	1960	1998	1	2025	0	
Cornell University	Big Red	Ithaca	New York	ECAC	Ivy League	1900	1947	25	1967, 1968, 1969, 1970, 1972, 1973, 1980, 1981, 1986, 1991, 1996, 1997, 2002, 2003, 2005, 2006, 2009, 2010, 2012, 2017, 2018, 2019, 2023, 2024, 2025	2	1967, 1970
Dartmouth College	Big Green	Hanover	New Hampshire	ECAC	Ivy League	1905	1947	4	1948, 1949, 1979, 1980	0	
University of Denver	Pioneers	Denver	Colorado	NCHC	West Coast Conference	1949	1949	35	1958, 1960, 1961, 1963, 1964, 1966, 1968, 1969, 1971, 1972, 1973, 1986, 1995, 1997, 1999, 2002, 2004, 2005, 2008, 2009, 2010, 2011, 2012, 2013, 2014, 2015, 2016, 2017, 2018, 2019, 2022, 2023, 2024, 2025, 2026	11	1958, 1960, 1961, 1968, 1969, 2004, 2005, 2017, 2022, 2024, 2026
Ferris State University	Bulldogs	Big Rapids	Michigan	CCHA	GLIAC (D-II)	1975	1979	4	2003, 2012, 2014, 2016	0	
Harvard University	Crimson	Cambridge (Note: Harvard's administration and undergraduate campus are in Cambridge, but the men's and women's hockey teams play in Allston, a neighborhood within the city of Boston.)	Massachusetts	ECAC	Ivy League	1897	1947	26	1955, 1957, 1958, 1969, 1971, 1974, 1975, 1982, 1983, 1985, 1986, 1987, 1988, 1989, 1993, 1994, 2002, 2003, 2004, 2005, 2006, 2015, 2016, 2017, 2019, 2022	1	1989
College of the Holy Cross	Crusaders	Worcester	Massachusetts	AHA	Patriot League	1966	1966	2	2004, 2006	0	
Lake Superior State University	Lakers	Sault Ste. Marie	Michigan	CCHA	GLIAC (D-II)	1966	1966	11	1985, 1988, 1989, 1990, 1991, 1992, 1993, 1994, 1995, 1996, 2021	3	1988, 1992, 1994
Lindenwood University	Lions	St. Charles	Missouri	Independent	OVC	2003	2022 (Note: Lindenwood, which then fielded two men's hockey teams at different levels of the club-level American Collegiate Hockey Association, announced in February 2021 that it would transfer the team that competed in the ACHA Division 1 Central States Collegiate Hockey League to full varsity status after the 2021–22 season.)	0		0	
Long Island University	Sharks	Brooklyn & Brookville (Note: LIU has main campuses in both Brooklyn and Brookville. All LIU varsity teams are open to students from both campuses who meet NCAA eligibility requirements.)	New York	Independent (Note: Although LIU played its first season of men's hockey in 2020–21 as an independent, it was in a scheduling alliance with Atlantic Hockey.)	NEC	2020	2020	0		0	
University of Maine	Black Bears	Orono	Maine	Hockey East	America East	1977	1977	20	1987, 1988, 1989, 1990, 1991, 1992, 1993, 1995, 1999, 2000, 2001, 2002, 2003, 2004, 2005, 2006, 2007, 2012, 2024, 2025	2	1993, 1999
Maryville University	Saints	Town and Country (Note: The main Maryville campus has a St. Louis mailing address.)	Missouri	Independent	GLVC (D-II)	2027	2027	0		0	
University of Massachusetts Amherst	Minutemen	Amherst	Massachusetts	Hockey East	MAC	1908	1993^{D}	6	2007, 2019, 2021, 2022, 2024, 2025	1	2021
University of Massachusetts Lowell	River Hawks	Lowell	Massachusetts	Hockey East	America East	1967	1984	9	1988, 1994, 1996, 2012, 2013, 2014, 2016, 2017, 2022	0	^{E}
Merrimack College	Warriors	North Andover	Massachusetts	Hockey East	Metro	1956	1984	2	1988, 2011	0	^{F}
Miami University	RedHawks	Oxford	Ohio	NCHC	MAC	1978	1978	12	1993, 1997, 2004, 2006, 2007, 2008, 2009, 2010, 2011, 2012, 2013, 2015	0	
University of Michigan	Wolverines	Ann Arbor	Michigan	Big Ten	Big Ten	1923	1947	41	1948, 1949, 1950, 1951, 1952, 1953, 1954, 1955, 1956, 1957, 1962, 1964, 1977, 1991, 1992, 1993, 1994, 1995, 1996, 1997, 1998, 1999, 2000, 2001, 2002, 2003, 2004, 2005, 2006, 2007, 2008, 2009, 2010, 2011, 2012, 2016, 2018, 2021, 2022, 2023, 2024, 2025, 2026	9	1948, 1951, 1952, 1953, 1955, 1956, 1964, 1996, 1998
Michigan State University	Spartans	East Lansing	Michigan	Big Ten	Big Ten	1921	1947	29	1959, 1966, 1967, 1982, 1983, 1984, 1985, 1986, 1987, 1988, 1989, 1990, 1992, 1994, 1995, 1996, 1997, 1998, 1999, 2000, 2001, 2002, 2004, 2006, 2007, 2008, 2012, 2024, 2025, 2026	3	1966, 1986, 2007
Michigan Technological University	Huskies	Houghton	Michigan	CCHA	GLIAC (D-II)	1919	1947	16	1956, 1960, 1962, 1965, 1969, 1970, 1974, 1975, 1976, 1981, 2015, 2017, 2018, 2022, 2023, 2024	3	1962, 1965, 1975
University of Minnesota	Golden Gophers	Minneapolis	Minnesota	Big Ten	Big Ten	1921	1947	42	1953, 1954, 1961, 1971, 1974, 1975, 1976, 1979, 1980, 1981, 1983, 1985, 1986, 1987, 1988, 1989, 1990, 1991, 1992, 1993, 1994, 1995, 1996, 1997, 2001, 2002, 2003, 2004, 2005, 2006, 2007, 2008, 2012, 2013, 2014, 2015, 2017, 2021, 2022, 2023, 2024, 2025	5	1974, 1976, 1979, 2002, 2003
University of Minnesota Duluth	Bulldogs	Duluth	Minnesota	NCHC	NSIC (D-II)	1930	1947	15	1983, 1984, 1985, 1993, 2004, 2009, 2011, 2012, 2015, 2016, 2017, 2018, 2019, 2021, 2022	3	2011, 2018, 2019
Minnesota State University, Mankato	Mavericks	Mankato	Minnesota	CCHA	NSIC (D-II)	1969	1996	10	2003, 2013, 2014, 2015, 2018, 2019, 2021, 2022, 2023, 2025	0	^{G}
University of New Hampshire	Wildcats	Durham	New Hampshire	Hockey East	America East	1924	1947	22	1977, 1979, 1982, 1987, 1992, 1994, 1995, 1997, 1998, 1999, 2000, 2002, 2003, 2004, 2005, 2006, 2007, 2008, 2009, 2010, 2011, 2013	0	
Niagara University	Purple Eagles	Lewiston (Note: Mailing address is "Niagara University".)	New York	AHA	Metro	1996	1996	4	2000, 2004, 2008, 2013	0	
University of North Dakota	Fighting Hawks	Grand Forks	North Dakota	NCHC	Summit League	1929	1947	35	1958, 1959, 1963, 1965, 1967, 1968, 1979, 1980, 1982, 1984, 1987, 1990, 1997, 1998, 1999, 2000, 2001, 2003, 2004, 2005, 2006, 2007, 2008, 2009, 2010, 2011, 2012, 2013, 2014, 2015, 2016, 2017, 2021, 2022, 2024	8	1959, 1963, 1980, 1982, 1987, 1997, 2000, 2016
Northeastern University	Huskies	Boston	Massachusetts	Hockey East	CAA	1929	1947	8	1982, 1988, 1994, 2008, 2016, 2018, 2019, 2022	0	
Northern Michigan University	Wildcats	Marquette	Michigan	CCHA	GLIAC (D-II)	1976	1976	8	1980, 1981, 1989, 1991, 1992, 1993, 1999, 2010	1	1991
University of Notre Dame	Fighting Irish	Notre Dame	Indiana	Big Ten	ACC	1912	1947	13	2004, 2007, 2008, 2009, 2011, 2013, 2014, 2016, 2017, 2018, 2019, 2021, 2022	0	
Ohio State University	Buckeyes	Columbus	Ohio	Big Ten	Big Ten	1963	1963	11	1998, 1999, 2003, 2004, 2005, 2009, 2017, 2018, 2019, 2023, 2025	0	
University of Nebraska Omaha	Mavericks	Omaha	Nebraska	NCHC	Summit League	1997	1997	5	2006, 2011, 2015, 2021, 2024	0	
Pennsylvania State University	Nittany Lions	University Park (Note: The entire Penn State campus is treated by the U.S. Postal Service as "University Park". It straddles the boundary between State College and College Township; the hockey arena is in the latter.)	Pennsylvania	Big Ten	Big Ten	1909	2012	4	2017, 2018, 2023, 2025	0	
Princeton University	Tigers	Princeton	New Jersey	ECAC	Ivy League	1900	1947	4	1998, 2008, 2009, 2018	0	
Providence College	Friars	Providence	Rhode Island	Hockey East	Big East	1926	1947	16	1964, 1978, 1981, 1983, 1985, 1989, 1991, 1996, 2001, 2014, 2015, 2016, 2017, 2018, 2019, 2025	1	2015
Quinnipiac University	Bobcats	Hamden	Connecticut	ECAC	Metro	1975	1999	11	2002, 2013, 2014, 2015, 2016, 2019, 2021, 2022, 2023, 2024, 2025	1	2023
Rensselaer Polytechnic Institute	Engineers	Troy	New York	ECAC	Liberty (D-III)	1901	1947	9	1953, 1954, 1961, 1964, 1984, 1985, 1994, 1995, 2011	2	1954, 1985
Robert Morris University	Colonials	Moon Township	Pennsylvania	AHA	Horizon	2004	2023 (Note: Robert Morris dropped both men's and women's ice hockey after the 2020–21 season due to financial issues brought on by COVID-19. A subsequent fundraising drive was successful enough that RMU announced both teams would be reinstated in the 2023–24 season.)	1	2014	0	
Rochester Institute of Technology^{H}	Tigers	Rochester	New York	AHA	Liberty (D-III)	1962	2005	4	2010, 2015, 2016, 2024	0	
Sacred Heart University	Pioneers	Fairfield	Connecticut	AHA	Metro	1993	1993	0		0	
St. Cloud State University	Huskies	St. Cloud	Minnesota	NCHC	NSIC (D-II)	1931	1987	17	1989, 2000, 2001, 2002, 2003, 2007, 2008, 2010, 2013, 2014, 2015, 2016, 2018, 2019, 2021, 2022, 2023	0	
St. Lawrence University	Saints	Canton	New York	ECAC	Liberty (D-III)	1925	1947	16	1952, 1955, 1956, 1959, 1960, 1961, 1962, 1983, 1987, 1988, 1989, 1992, 1999, 2000, 2001, 2007	0	
University of St. Thomas	Tommies	Saint Paul	Minnesota	NCHC	Summit League	1925	2021	0		0	
Stonehill College	Skyhawks	Easton	Massachusetts	Independent	NEC	1999	2022	0		0	
Union College	Garnet Chargers	Schenectady	New York	ECAC	Liberty (D-III)	1903	1991^{I}	5	2011, 2012, 2013, 2014, 2017	1	2014
University of Vermont	Catamounts	Burlington	Vermont	Hockey East	America East	1963	1975	6	1988, 1996, 1997, 2009, 2010, 2014	0	
Western Michigan University	Broncos	Kalamazoo	Michigan	NCHC	MAC	1973	1975	10	1986, 1994, 1996, 2011, 2012, 2017, 2022, 2023, 2024, 2025	1	2025
University of Wisconsin-Madison	Badgers	Madison	Wisconsin	Big Ten	Big Ten	1921	1947	28	1970, 1972, 1973, 1977, 1978, 1981, 1982, 1983, 1988, 1989, 1990, 1991, 1992, 1993, 1994, 1995, 1998, 2000, 2001, 2004, 2005, 2006, 2008, 2010, 2013, 2014, 2021, 2024	6	1973, 1977, 1981, 1983, 1990, 2006
Yale University	Bulldogs	New Haven	Connecticut	ECAC	Ivy League	1895	1947	8	1952, 1998, 2009, 2010, 2011, 2013, 2015, 2016	1	2013

=== Notes ===
^A The NCAA began sponsoring ice hockey in the 1947–48 season. All teams before 1956, and those classified in the 'University Division' from 1956 to 1972 are retroactively considered Division I.
^B Bemidji State also competed in Division I from 1947 to 1950 and 1959 to 1967.
^C Bemidji State won Division II National Championships in 1984, 1993, 1994, 1995, and 1997, and a Division III Championship in 1986.
^D UMass also competed in Division I from 1947 to 1961.
^E UMass Lowell won Division II National Championships in 1979, 1981, and 1982.
^F Merrimack won a Division II National Championship in 1978.
^G Minnesota State won a Division II National Championship in 1980.
^H RIT won a Division II National Championship in 1983 and a Division III Championship in 1985.
^I Union also competed in Division I from 1947 to 1949.

Map

The below maps show the locations of teams that have won the championship; the color of the dot indicates the number of titles.

Schools with D1 Men's Ice Hockey championships
– 10 championships, – 9 championships, – 8 championships, – 6 championships, – 5 championships, – 3 championships, – 2 championships, – 1 championship
Schools with D1 Men's Ice Hockey championships
– 5 championships, – 1 championship
Schools with D1 Men's Ice Hockey championships
– 9 championships, – 3 championships, – 1 championship

== Women ==
School	Team	City	State	Current Conference	Primary Conference	First Played	Joined Div I (Note: The NCAA began sponsoring women's hockey in the 2000–01 season.)	NCAA Tourneys (Qty)	NCAA Tourneys (Years)	National Champs (Qty)	National Champs (Years)
Assumption University	Greyhounds	Worcester	Massachusetts	NEWHA	NE10 (D-II)	2023	2023 (Note: Assumption joined the NEWHA for administrative purposes in July 2022, but did not start varsity play until 2023–24.)	0		0	
Bemidji State University	Beavers	Bemidji	Minnesota	WCHA	NSIC (D-II)	1998	2000	0		0	
Boston College	Eagles	Chestnut Hill	Massachusetts	Hockey East	ACC	1994	2000	12	2007, 2009, 2011, 2012, 2013, 2014, 2015, 2016, 2017, 2018, 2019, 2021	0	
Boston University	Terriers	Boston	Massachusetts	Hockey East	Patriot League	2005	2005	7	2010, 2011, 2012, 2013, 2014, 2015, 2025	0	
Brown University	Bears	Providence	Rhode Island	ECAC	Ivy League	1967	2000	1	2002	0	
Clarkson University	Golden Knights	Potsdam	New York	ECAC	Liberty (D-III)	2003	2003	13	2010, 2013, 2014, 2015, 2016, 2017, 2018, 2019, 2020, 2022, 2023, 2024, 2025	3	2014, 2017, 2018
Colgate University	Raiders	Hamilton	New York	ECAC	Patriot League	1997	2001	6	2018, 2021, 2022, 2023, 2024, 2025	0	
University of Connecticut	Huskies	Storrs	Connecticut	Hockey East	Big East	2000	2000	1	2024	0	
Cornell University	Big Red	Ithaca	New York	ECAC	Ivy League	1972	2000	10	2010, 2011, 2012, 2013, 2014, 2017, 2019, 2020, 2024, 2025	0	
Dartmouth College	Big Green	Hanover	New Hampshire	ECAC	Ivy League	1977	2000	7	2001, 2003, 2004, 2005, 2007, 2009, 2011	0	
University of Delaware	Blue Hens	Newark	Delaware	AHA	CUSA	2003	2025	0		0	
Franklin Pierce University	Ravens	Rindge	New Hampshire	NEWHA	NE-10 (D-II)	2012	2017	0		0	
Harvard University	Crimson	Cambridge	Massachusetts	ECAC	Ivy League	1977	2000	12	2001, 2003, 2004, 2005, 2006, 2007, 2008, 2010, 2013, 2014, 2015, 2022	0	
College of the Holy Cross	Crusaders	Worcester	Massachusetts	Hockey East	Patriot League	1999	2017	0		0	
Lindenwood University	Lady Lions	St. Charles	Missouri	AHA	OVC	2003	2011	0		0	
Long Island University	Sharks	Brooklyn & Brookville (Note: LIU has main campuses in both Brooklyn and Brookville. All LIU varsity teams are open to students from both campuses who meet NCAA eligibility requirements.)	New York	NEWHA	NEC	2019	2019	1	2023	0	
University of Maine	Black Bears	Orono	Maine	Hockey East	America East	1997	2000	0		0	
Mercyhurst University	Lakers	Erie	Pennsylvania	AHA	NEC (Transitioning to D-I, 2024–27)	1999	2000	13	2005, 2006, 2007, 2008, 2009, 2010, 2011, 2012, 2013, 2014, 2016, 2018, 2020	0	
Merrimack College	Warriors	North Andover	Massachusetts	Hockey East	Metro	1956	2013	1	2015	0	
University of Minnesota	Golden Gophers	Minneapolis	Minnesota	WCHA	Big Ten	1997	2000	24	2002, 2003, 2004, 2005, 2006, 2008, 2009, 2010, 2011, 2012, 2013, 2014, 2015, 2016, 2017, 2018, 2019, 2020, 2022, 2023, 2024, 2025	6	2004, 2005, 2012, 2013, 2015, 2016 (Note: Minnesota won the American Women's College Hockey Alliance championship in 2000.)
University of Minnesota Duluth	Bulldogs	Duluth	Minnesota	WCHA	NSIC (D-II)	1999	2000	16	2001, 2002, 2003, 2005, 2006, 2007, 2008, 2009, 2010, 2011, 2017, 2021, 2022, 2023, 2024, 2025	5	2001, 2002, 2003, 2008, 2010
Minnesota State University, Mankato	Mavericks	Mankato	Minnesota	WCHA	NSIC (D-II)	1998	2000	0		0	
University of New Hampshire	Wildcats	Durham	New Hampshire	Hockey East	America East	1977	2000	5	2006, 2007, 2008, 2009, 2010	0	
Northeastern University	Huskies	Boston	Massachusetts	Hockey East	CAA	1980	2000	7	2016, 2018, 2019, 2020, 2021, 2022, 2023	0	
Ohio State University	Buckeyes	Columbus	Ohio	WCHA	Big Ten	1999	2000	7	2018, 2020, 2021, 2022, 2023, 2024, 2025	2	2022, 2024
Pennsylvania State University	Nittany Lions	University Park (Note: The entire Penn State campus is treated by the U.S. Postal Service as "University Park". It straddles the boundary between State College and College Township.)	Pennsylvania	AHA	Big Ten	1996	2012	3	2023, 2024, 2025	0	
Post University	Eagles	Waterbury	Connecticut	NEWHA	CACC (D-II)	2016	2017	0		0	
Princeton University	Tigers	Princeton	New Jersey	ECAC	Ivy League	1979	2000	4	2006, 2016, 2019, 2020	0	
Providence College	Friars	Providence	Rhode Island	Hockey East	Big East	1974	2000	2	2005, 2021	0	
Quinnipiac University	Bobcats	Hamden	Connecticut	ECAC	Metro	2001	2001	4	2015, 2016, 2022, 2023	0	
Rensselaer Polytechnic Institute	Engineers	Troy	New York	ECAC	Liberty (D-III)	1996	2005	0		0	
Robert Morris University	Colonials	Moon Township	Pennsylvania	AHA	Horizon	2004	2023 (Note: Robert Morris dropped both men's and women's ice hockey after the 2020–21 season due to financial issues brought on by COVID-19. A subsequent fundraising drive was successful enough that RMU announced both teams would be reinstated in the 2023–24 season.)	2	2017, 2021	0	
Rochester Institute of Technology	Tigers	Henrietta	New York	AHA	Liberty (D-III)	1975	2012	1	2015	0	
Sacred Heart University	Pioneers	Fairfield	Connecticut	NEWHA	Metro	1996	2003	1	2025	0	
Saint Anselm College	Hawks	Goffstown	New Hampshire	NEWHA	NE-10 (D-II)	2004	2017	0		0	
St. Cloud State University	Huskies	St. Cloud	Minnesota	WCHA	NSIC (D-II)	1998	2000	0		0	
St. Lawrence University	Saints	Canton	New York	ECAC	Liberty (D-III)	1978	2000	11	2001, 2003, 2004, 2005, 2006, 2007, 2008, 2012, 2017, 2024, 2025	0	
Saint Michael's College	Purple Knights	Colchester	Vermont	NEWHA	NE-10 (D-II)	2001	2017	0		0	
University of St. Thomas	Tommies	Saint Paul	Minnesota	WCHA	Summit League	1998	2021	0		0	
Stonehill College	Skyhawks	Easton	Massachusetts	NEWHA	NEC	2022	2022	1	2024	0	
Syracuse University	Orange	Syracuse	New York	AHA	ACC	2008	2008	2	2019, 2022	0	
Union College	Garnet Chargers	Schenectady	New York	ECAC	Liberty (D-III)	1999	2003	0		0	
University of Vermont	Catamounts	Burlington	Vermont	Hockey East	America East	1998	2000	0		0	
University of Wisconsin-Madison	Badgers	Madison	Wisconsin	WCHA	Big Ten	1999	2000	18	2005, 2006, 2007, 2008, 2009, 2011, 2012, 2014, 2015, 2016, 2017, 2018, 2019, 2020, 2021, 2022, 2023, 2024, 2025	8	2006, 2007, 2009, 2011, 2019, 2021, 2023, 2025
Yale University	Bulldogs	New Haven	Connecticut	ECAC	Ivy League	1977	2000	2	2022, 2023	0	

== See also ==
- List of NCAA Division II ice hockey programs
- List of NCAA Division III ice hockey programs
- List of defunct men's college ice hockey teams
- List of NCAA Division I institutions
- List of NCAA Division I baseball programs
- List of NCAA fencing schools
- List of NCAA Division I FBS football programs
- List of NCAA Division I FCS football programs
- List of NCAA Division I lacrosse programs
- List of college swimming and diving teams
- List of NCAA Division I ice hockey arenas
