= List of NCAA Division I FBS football programs =

Schools playing American football at the highest level

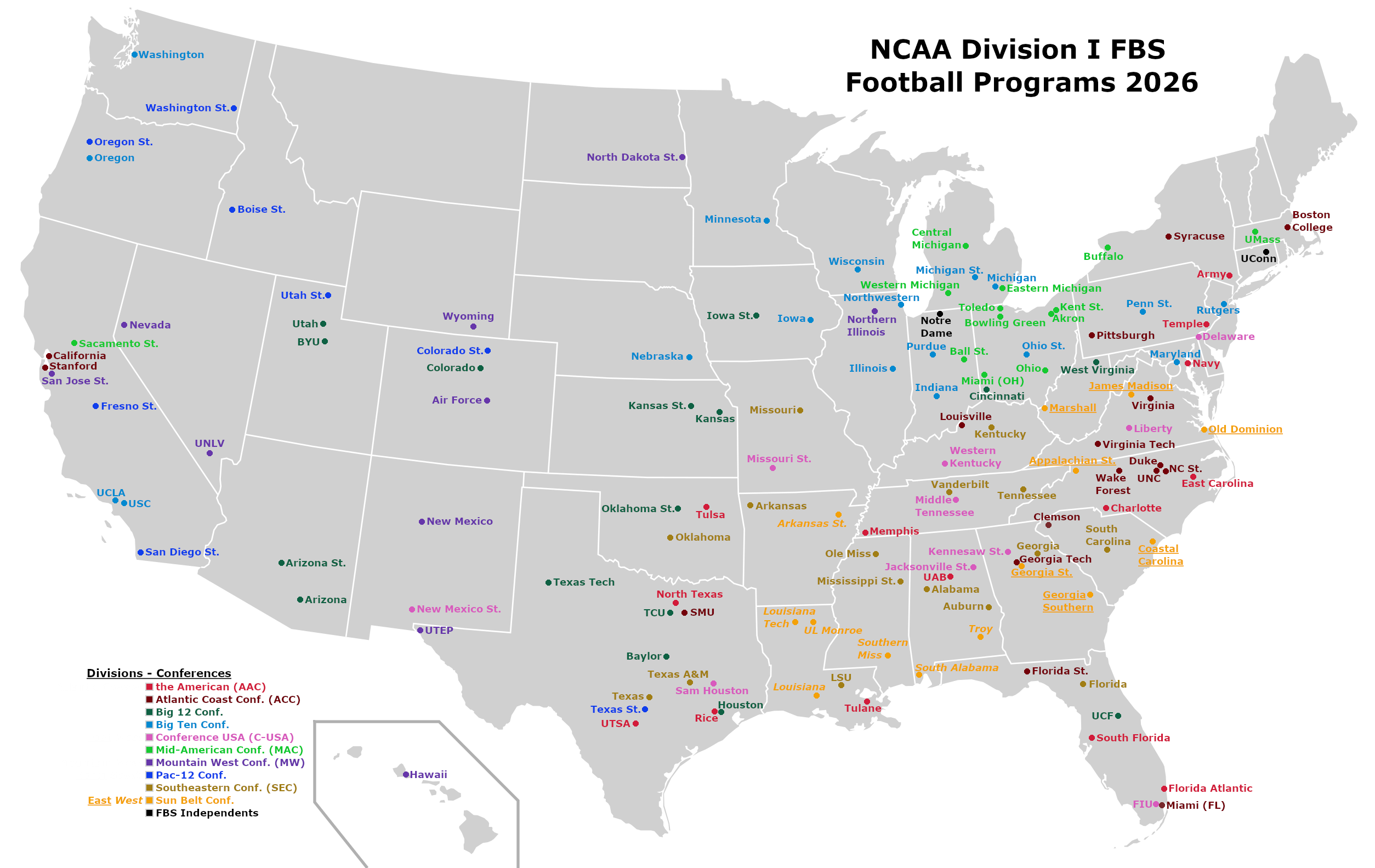
Map of FBS football programs as of 2026

This is a list of the 138 schools in the Division I Football Bowl Subdivision (FBS) of the National Collegiate Athletic Association (NCAA) in the United States. By definition, all schools in this grouping have varsity football teams.

Schools in Division I FBS are distinguished from those in the Division I Football Championship Subdivision (FCS) by being allowed to provide scholarship aid to a total of 85 players, and may grant a full scholarship to all 85. FCS schools are limited to financial assistance amounting to a maximum of 63 full scholarships, although some conferences voluntarily place further restrictions on athletic aid. The NCAA classifies FBS football as a "head-count" sport, meaning that each player receiving any athletically-related aid from the school counts fully against the 85-player limit. By contrast, FCS football is classified as an "equivalency" sport, which means that scholarship aid is limited to the equivalent of a specified number of full scholarships. In turn, this means that FCS schools can freely grant partial scholarships, but are also limited to a total of 85 players receiving assistance. Another NCAA rule mandates that any multi-sport athlete who plays football and receives any athletic aid is counted against the football limit, with an exception for players in non-scholarship FCS programs who receive aid in another sport. The three service academies that play in Division I FBS, Air Force, Army, and Navy, are theoretically subject to this rule, but are exempt in practice because all students at these schools receive full scholarships from the federal government.

Starting in 2014, the FBS began playing a tournament known as the College Football Playoff (CFP) culminating in a National Championship Game to determine its national champion, a system that has been in place from the 2014–2025 seasons by contract with ESPN, broadcaster of the games. The CFP featured four teams from its first season in 2014 through the 2023 season, and expanded to 12 teams in 2024. But since the CFP is not sanctioned by the NCAA, this makes FBS football the only sport without an NCAA-sanctioned champion. The FCS is the highest division in college football to hold a playoff tournament sanctioned by the NCAA to determine its champion.

The list includes all current and former FBS, Division I-A, Division I, University Division, and Major-College football teams since 1946 when the NCAA started having continuous records of major football teams. In the 1940s, 50s, and 60s major-status was only based on whether the team had a majority of their schedule filled with major opponents which caused schools like Arizona State to lose "major" status in certain years and schools that were on the borderline like Idaho and Pacific who scheduled each other in certain seasons to change status almost every other year.

== FBS programs ==
In addition to the following list of FBS programs, there is also a List of NCAA Division I FBS football stadiums. Conference affiliations are current for the upcoming 2026 season.

School	Nickname	City	State (Note: 7 states (Alaska, Maine, Montana, New Hampshire, Rhode Island, South Dakota, Vermont) and Washington, D.C. do not currently have FBS programs.)	Enrollment	Current conference (Note: According to conferences in football, not necessarily a team's primary conference.)	Former conferences	First year	Joined FBS	First joined FBS	Left FBS
Air Force	Falcons	USAF Academy (Note: While the academy is often described as being in Colorado Springs, virtually the entire grounds, including the football stadium, lies outside the city limits in an area designated by the U.S. Census Bureau as "Air Force Academy" and the U.S. Postal Service as "USAF Academy".)	CO	4,181	Mountain West	WAC	1955	1957		–
Akron	Zips	Akron	OH	14,516	MAC	OAC, MCC, OVC	1891	1987		–
Alabama	Crimson Tide	Tuscaloosa	AL	38,316	SEC	SIAA, SoCon	1892			
Appalachian State	Mountaineers	Boone	NC	21,798	Sun Belt	NSC, SoCon	1928	2014	1974	1981
Arizona	Wildcats	Tucson	AZ	49,471	Big 12	BIAA, WAC, Pac-12	1899			
Arizona State	Sun Devils	Tempe	AZ	77,881	Big 12	BIAA, WAC, Pac-12	1896			
Arkansas	Razorbacks	Fayetteville	AR	29,068	SEC	SWC	1894			
Arkansas State	Red Wolves	Jonesboro	AR	12,863	Sun Belt	AIC, Southland, Big West	1911	1992	1975	1981
Army	Black Knights	West Point	NY	4,594	American (Note: American football-only member. Primary conference: Patriot.)	CUSA, Independent	1890			
Auburn	Tigers	Auburn	AL	31,526	SEC	SIAA, SoCon	1892			
Ball State	Cardinals	Muncie	IN	19,337	MAC	IIC, ICC	1924	1982	1975	1981
Baylor	Bears	Waco	TX	20,626	Big 12	TIAA, SWC	1899			
Boise State	Broncos	Boise	ID	25,830	Pac-12	ICAC, Big Sky, Big West, WAC, Mountain West	1933 (Note: At that time, the school was a two-year college known as Boise Junior College. The school did not become a four-year institution until 1965, and only began playing football against four-year schools in 1968.)	1996		–
Boston College	Eagles	Chestnut Hill (Note: BC's main campus and stadium have Chestnut Hill mailing addresses. However, Chestnut Hill is not an incorporated community; the stadium is within the city limits of Newton.)	MA	15,046	ACC	Big East	1893			
Bowling Green	Falcons	Bowling Green	OH	17,645	MAC	NOIAA, OAC	1919	1982	1962	1981
Buffalo	Bulls	Buffalo (Note: UB's campus has a Buffalo mailing address, but most of the campus, including the football stadium, is in the adjacent town of Amherst.)	NY	32,332	MAC	NYSC	1894	1999	1962	1970
BYU	Cougars	Provo	UT	34,802	Big 12	Rocky Mountain, Mountain States, WAC, MW, Independent	1922			
California	Golden Bears	Berkeley	CA	45,435	ACC	PCC, Pac-12	1882			
Central Michigan	Chippewas	Mount Pleasant	MI	15,465	MAC	MCC, IIAC	1896	1975		–
Charlotte	49ers	Charlotte	NC	30,448	American	FCS independent, CUSA	1946 (Note: The team played in its first three years of existence (1946–1948), but folded in 1949. The football program was restarted in 2013; 13 years ago.)	2015		–
Cincinnati	Bearcats	Cincinnati	OH	50,921	Big 12	OAC, Buckeye, MAC, MVC, CUSA, Big East, American	1885	1983	- 1948	1946; 1948; 1981
Clemson	Tigers	Clemson	SC	27,341	ACC	SIAA, SAIAA, SoCon	1896			
Coastal Carolina	Chanticleers	Conway	SC	10,473	Sun Belt	Big South	2003	2017		–
Colorado	Buffaloes	Boulder	CO	37,956	Big 12	CFA, Rocky Mountain, Mountain States, Big Eight, Pac-12	1890			
Colorado State	Rams	Fort Collins	CO	32,777	Pac-12	CFA, Rocky Mountain, Mountain States, WAC, Mountain West	1890			
Delaware	Fightin' Blue Hens	Newark	DE	24,221	CUSA	Mason–Dixon, MAC, DII independent, FCS independent, Yankee, A-10, CAA Football	1889	2025		–
Duke	Blue Devils	Durham	NC	17,620	ACC	SoCon	1888			
East Carolina	Pirates	Greenville	NC	28,021	American	NSC, Carolinas, SoCon, CUSA	1932	1966		–
Eastern Michigan	Eagles	Ypsilanti	MI	15,370	MAC	MIAA, MCC, IIAC, PAC	1891	1982	1976	1981
Florida Atlantic	Owls	Boca Raton	FL	30,155	American	Sun Belt, C-USA	2001	2006		–
FIU	Panthers	Miami (Note: The FIU campus has a Miami mailing address, but is located outside the Miami city limits in University Park, Florida, an unincorporated area of Miami-Dade County.)	FL	56,732	CUSA	Sun Belt	2002	2006		–
Florida	Gators	Gainesville	FL	55,781	SEC	SIAA, SoCon	1906			
Florida State	Seminoles	Tallahassee	FL	45,130	ACC	Dixie	1947	1955		–
Fresno State	Bulldogs	Fresno	CA	24,585	Pac-12	CCC, NCAC, CCAA, Big West, WAC, Mountain West	1921	1969		–
Georgia	Bulldogs	Athens	GA	40,118	SEC	SIAA, SoCon	1892			
Georgia Southern	Eagles	Statesboro	GA	27,091	Sun Belt	SoCon	1924	2014		–
Georgia State	Panthers	Atlanta	GA	55,466	Sun Belt	CAA Football	2010	2013		–
Georgia Tech	Yellow Jackets	Atlanta	GA	43,844	ACC	SIAA, SoCon, SEC	1892			
Hawaiʻi	Rainbow Warriors	Honolulu	HI	19,097	Mountain West	WAC	1909	1974		–
Houston	Cougars	Houston	TX	47,031	Big 12	Lone Star, Gulf Coast, MVC, SWC, CUSA, American (Note: Houston, Memphis, and SMU had originally planned to join the Big East Conference in 2013. However, the conference split along football lines in July 2013, with the seven non-FBS schools of the original conference buying the "Big East" name and reorganizing as a new, Non-football Big East Conference. The FBS schools that did not leave at that time for the ACC joined the three newcomers, remaining in the original conference structure under the new name of American Athletic Conference.)	1946	1949		–
Illinois	Fighting Illini	Urbana-Champaign (Note: The Illinois campus is bisected by the Urbana–Champaign border. The academic administration and most of the undergraduate campus are in Urbana; the athletic administration and most athletic facilities, including the football stadium, are in Champaign.)	IL	56,607	Big Ten	IIFL	1890			
Indiana	Hoosiers	Bloomington	IN	45,328	Big Ten	IIAA	1887			
Iowa	Hawkeyes	Iowa City	IA	29,909	Big Ten	WIUFA, MVC	1889			
Iowa State	Cyclones	Ames	IA	30,708	Big 12	MVC, Big 8	1892			
Jacksonville State	Gamecocks	Jacksonville	AL	9,540	CUSA	Independent, SIAA, SSC, GSC, DII Independent, Southland, OVC, AQ7, ASUN	1904	2023		–
James Madison	Dukes	Harrisonburg	VA	22,224	Sun Belt	DII Independent, VCAA, Yankee, A-10, CAA Football	1972	2022		–
Kansas	Jayhawks	Lawrence (Note: Due to stadium renovations, Kansas is playing its 2024 home schedule at two off-campus venues. The two non-conference games are being played at Children's Mercy Park in Kansas City, Kansas, and the four conference games at Arrowhead Stadium in Kansas City, Missouri.)	KS	26,780	Big 12	KCAC, WIUFA, MVC, Big 8	1890			
Kansas State	Wildcats	Manhattan	KS	20,229	Big 12	MVC, Big 8	1896			
Kennesaw State	Owls	Kennesaw (Note: The KSU campus has a Kennesaw mailing address, but is located in unincorporated Cobb County.)	GA	45,152	CUSA	ASUN, FCS independent	2015	2024		–
Kent State	Golden Flashes	Kent	OH	26,597	MAC	OAC	1920	1982	1962	1981
Kentucky	Wildcats	Lexington	KY	30,390	SEC	SIAA, SoCon	1881			
Liberty	Flames	Lynchburg	VA	95,148	CUSA	Big South, Independent	1973	2018		–
Louisiana	Ragin' Cajuns	Lafayette	LA	16,225	Sun Belt	LIAA, LIC, Gulf States, SIAA, Southland, Big West	1902	1974		–
Louisiana Tech	Bulldogs	Ruston	LA	11,037	Sun Belt	LIAA, LIC, Gulf States, SIAA, Southland, Big West, WAC, CUSA	1901	1989	1975	1981
Louisville	Cardinals	Louisville	KY	22,140	ACC	KIAC, SIAA, KIAC, OVC, MVC, CUSA, Big East, American	1910	1962	1951	1951
LSU	Tigers	Baton Rouge	LA	35,912	SEC	SIAA, SoCon	1893			
Marshall	Thundering Herd	Huntington	WV	11,125	Sun Belt	WVIAC, Buckeye, OVC, MAC, SoCon, CUSA	1895	1997	1962	1981
Maryland	Terrapins	College Park	MD	41,272	Big Ten	MIFA, SAIAA, SoCon, ACC	1888			
Memphis	Tigers	Memphis	TN	21,622	American	Mississippi Valley, SIAA, Missouri Valley, CUSA	1912	1960		–
Miami (FL)	Hurricanes	Coral Gables (Note: Miami currently plays its home games off campus in Miami Gardens, Florida at Hard Rock Stadium, home of the NFL's Miami Dolphins.)	FL	19,096	ACC	SIAA, Big East	1926			
Miami (OH)	RedHawks	Oxford	OH	19,216	MAC	OAC, Buckeye	1888	1982	1948; 1961	1949; 1981
Michigan	Wolverines	Ann Arbor	MI	50,278	Big Ten	None (Note: Michigan, Minnesota, Northwestern, and Wisconsin have never switched conferences.)	1879			
Michigan State	Spartans	East Lansing	MI	49,659	Big Ten	MIAA	1885			
Middle Tennessee	Blue Raiders	Murfreesboro	TN	20,857	CUSA	VSAC, SIAA, OVC, Sun Belt	1911	1999		–
Minnesota	Golden Gophers	Minneapolis	MN	52,376	Big Ten	None	1882			
Mississippi State	Bulldogs	Starkville (Note: Although Mississippi State is usually identified as being in Starkville, virtually all of the Mississippi State campus, including the athletic facilities, is actually in an unincorporated area of Oktibbeha County designated by the U.S. Census Bureau and U.S. Postal Service as "Mississippi State".)	MS	23,086	SEC	SIAA, SoCon	1895			
Missouri	Tigers	Columbia	MO	31,412	SEC	WIUFA, Big 8, Big 12	1890			
Missouri State	Bears	Springfield	MO	23,418	CUSA	MIAA, Mid-Continent, MVFC	1909	2025		–
Navy	Midshipmen	Annapolis	MD	4,528	American	Independent	1879			
NC State	Wolfpack	Raleigh	NC	36,831	ACC	SAIAA, SIAA, SoCon	1892			
Nebraska	Cornhuskers	Lincoln	NE	24,431	Big Ten	WIUFA, MVC, Big 8, Big 12	1890			
Nevada	Wolf Pack	Reno	NV	21,034	Mountain West	NCAC, Big Sky, Big West, WAC	1896	1992	1950	
New Mexico	Lobos	Albuquerque	NM	21,738	Mountain West	BIAA, WAC	1892			
New Mexico State	Aggies	Las Cruces	NM	13,904	CUSA	BIAA, MVC, Big West, Sun Belt, WAC, Independent	1893	1959	- 1952	1947; 1953
North Carolina	Tar Heels	Chapel Hill	NC	31,733	ACC	SAIAA, SIAA, SoCon	1888			
North Dakota State	Bison	Fargo	ND	11,952	Mountain West (Note: Mountain West football-only member. Primary conference: Summit.)	North Central, Great West, MVFC	1894	2026		–
North Texas	Mean Green	Denton	TX	46,940	American	TIAA, Lone Star, GCC, MVC, Southland, Big West, Sun Belt, CUSA	1913	1995	1957	1981
Northern Illinois	Huskies	DeKalb	IL	16,234	Mountain West (Note: Mountain West football-only member. Primary conference: Horizon.)	IIAC, Big West, MAC	1899	1982	1969	1981
Northwestern	Wildcats	Evanston (Note: With Northwestern having demolished its on-campus stadium to replace it on-site with a new stadium, it will play its 2024 home schedule at two separate venues. Most games will be played at a temporary on-campus stadium, while two games will be played at Wrigley Field in Chicago.)	IL	22,933	Big Ten	None	1876			
Notre Dame	Fighting Irish	South Bend	IN	13,139	Independent	ACC (Note: Even though Notre Dame is a member of the ACC in other sports, it was a member of the ACC in football for the 2020 season due to COVID-19 impacts.)	1887			
Ohio	Bobcats	Athens	OH	24,429	MAC	OAC, Buckeye	1894	1982	1948; 1961	1948; 1981
Ohio State	Buckeyes	Columbus	OH	61,677	Big Ten	OAC	1889			
Oklahoma	Sooners	Norman	OK	28,042	SEC	Southwest, Big 8, Big 12	1895			
Oklahoma State	Cowboys	Stillwater	OK	24,660	Big 12	Southwest, MVIAA, MVC, Big 8	1901			
Old Dominion	Monarchs	Norfolk	VA	23,494	Sun Belt	FCS independent, CAA Football, CUSA	1930 (Note: The team played in its first eleven years of existence (1930–1940) as the Norfolk Division of the College of William & Mary, but folded in 1940. The football program was restarted in 2009; 17 years ago.)	2014		–
Ole Miss	Rebels	Oxford (Note: Although Ole Miss is usually identified as being in Oxford, the entire campus is in an unincorporated area of Lafayette County designated by both the U.S. Census Bureau and U.S. Postal Service as "University".)	MS	21,203	SEC	SIAA, SoCon	1893			
Oregon	Ducks	Eugene	OR	22,257	Big Ten	PCC, Independent, Pac-12	1894			
Oregon State	Beavers	Corvallis	OR	33,193	Pac-12	PCC, Independent	1893			
Penn State	Nittany Lions	University Park (Note: "University Park" is the United States Postal Service designation for the Penn State campus, which straddles the boundary between State College and College Township. The football stadium is in College Township.)	PA	47,560	Big Ten	Independent	1881			
Pittsburgh	Panthers	Pittsburgh (Note: Pittsburgh plays its home games off campus at Acrisure Stadium, home of the NFL's Pittsburgh Steelers.)	PA	29,238	ACC	Big East	1890			
Purdue	Boilermakers	West Lafayette	IN	49,639	Big Ten	IIAA	1887			
Rice	Owls	Houston	TX	8,285	American	TIAA, SWC, WAC, CUSA	1912			
Rutgers	Scarlet Knights	Piscataway (Note: The Rutgers campus is divided between New Brunswick and Piscataway. The overall administration and most campus buildings are in New Brunswick, while the athletic administration and most sports facilities, including the football stadium, are in Piscataway.)	NJ	50,804	Big Ten	Middle Atlantic, Big East, American	1869			
Sacramento State	Hornets	Sacramento	CA	31,274	MAC (Note: MAC football-only member. Primary conference: Big West.)	NCAC, WFC, AWC, Big Sky	1954	2026		-
Sam Houston	Bearkats	Huntsville	TX	21,679	CUSA	Independent, TIAA, LSC, GSC, Southland, WAC	1912	2023		–
San Diego State	Aztecs	San Diego	CA	35,732	Pac-12	SCJCC, SCIAC, CCAA, Big West, WAC, Mountain West	1921	1969		–
San Jose State	Spartans	San Jose	CA	37,133	Mountain West	CCC, NCAC, CCAA, Big West, WAC	1892	1950		–
SMU	Mustangs	University Park	TX	12,385	ACC	TIAA, SWC, WAC, CUSA, American	1915	1989	1986	
South Alabama	Jaguars	Mobile	AL	13,992	Sun Belt	FCS Independent	2009	2012		–
South Carolina	Gamecocks	Columbia	SC	35,471	SEC	SIAA, SoCon, ACC	1892			
South Florida	Bulls	Tampa (Note: South Florida plays its home games off campus at Raymond James Stadium, home of the NFL's Tampa Bay Buccaneers.)	FL	44,322	American	C-USA, Big East	1997	2001		–
Southern Miss	Golden Eagles	Hattiesburg	MS	14,146	Sun Belt	Gulf States, SIAA. C-USA	1912	1963	1960	1960
Stanford	Cardinal	Stanford (Note: While the university is often described as being in Palo Alto, the core of the campus, including the football stadium, lies outside the city limits in the census-designated place of Stanford. The entire campus, including the small parts within the Palo Alto city limits, has a mailing address of Stanford.)	CA	17,680	ACC	PCC, Pac-12	1891			
Syracuse	Orange	Syracuse	NY	21,772	ACC	Big East	1889			
TCU	Horned Frogs	Fort Worth	TX	11,938	Big 12	TIAA, SWC, WAC, CUSA, MW	1896			
Temple	Owls	Philadelphia (Note: Temple plays its home games off campus at Lincoln Financial Field, home of the NFL's Philadelphia Eagles.)	PA	35,626	American	Middle Atlantic, Big East, MAC, Big East	1894	1971		–
Tennessee	Volunteers	Knoxville	TN	31,701	SEC	SIAA, SoCon	1891			
Texas	Longhorns	Austin	TX	51,991	SEC	SIAA, TIAA, SWC, Big 12	1883			
Texas A&M	Aggies	College Station	TX	72,530	SEC	SIAA, SWC, Big 12	1876			
Texas State	Bobcats	San Marcos	TX	37,864	Pac-12	TIAA, Lone Star, Gulf Star, Southland, WAC, Sun Belt	1904	2012		–
Texas Tech	Red Raiders	Lubbock	TX	40,542	Big 12	BIAA, SWC	1925			
Toledo	Rockets	Toledo	OH	17,045	MAC	NOIAA, OAC	1917	1962		–
Troy	Trojans	Troy	AL	14,901	Sun Belt	AIC, SIAA, ACC, MSAC, Gulf South, Southland	1909	2002		–
Tulane	Green Wave	New Orleans	LA	13,127	American	SIAA, SoCon, SEC, CUSA	1893			
Tulsa	Golden Hurricane	Tulsa	OK	3,832	American	OIC, Big Four, MVC, WAC, CUSA	1895			
UAB	Blazers	Birmingham	AL	22,289	American	FCS Independent, CUSA	1991	2017	1996	2014
UCF	Knights	Orlando (Note: UCF has an Orlando mailing address, but the main campus, including all athletic facilities, is located in unincorporated Orange County.)	FL	70,406	Big 12	MAC, CUSA, American	1979	1996		–
UCLA	Bruins	Los Angeles	CA	47,516	Big Ten	SCIAC, PCC, Pac-12	1919			
UConn	Huskies	Storrs (Note: UConn currently plays its home games off campus at Rentschler Field in East Hartford, Connecticut.)	CT	32,146	Independent	Yankee, A-10, Big East, American	1896	2000		–
ULM	Warhawks	Monroe	LA	8,565	Sun Belt	Gulf States, Southland, Independent	1951	1994	1975	1981
UMass	Minutemen	Amherst (Note: The UMass campus has an Amherst mailing address, but the football stadium is in the adjacent town of Hadley.)	MA	32,045	MAC	Yankee, A-10, CAA Football, Independent	1879	2012		–
UNLV	Rebels	Las Vegas (Note: The UNLV campus is not within the City of Las Vegas, but is instead in the unincorporated community of Paradise. The Rebels play off campus at Allegiant Stadium, home of the NFL's Las Vegas Raiders, also within the boundaries of Paradise. The U.S. Postal Service considers all unincorporated communities in the Las Vegas Valley, including Paradise, to have a Las Vegas address.)	NV	30,679	Mountain West	Big West, WAC	1968	1978		–
USC	Trojans	Los Angeles	CA	49,318	Big Ten	PCC, Pac-12	1888			
Utah	Utes	Salt Lake City	UT	34,464	Big 12	CFA, RMAC, Mountain States, WAC, MW, Pac-12	1892			
Utah State	Aggies	Logan	UT	27,426	Pac-12	CFA, RMAC, Mountain States, Big West, Independent, Sun Belt, WAC, Mountain West	1892			
UTEP	Miners	El Paso	TX	24,003	Mountain West	BIAA, WAC, CUSA	1914			
UTSA	Roadrunners	San Antonio	TX	34,734	American	WAC, CUSA	2011	2012		–
Vanderbilt	Commodores	Nashville	TN	13,796	SEC	SIAA, SoCon	1890			
Virginia	Cavaliers	Charlottesville	VA	26,026	ACC	SAIAA, SoCon	1887			
Virginia Tech	Hokies	Blacksburg	VA	37,279	ACC	SAIAA, SIAA, SoCon, Big East	1892			
Wake Forest	Demon Deacons	Winston-Salem	NC	8,947	ACC	SoCon	1888			
Washington	Huskies	Seattle	WA	52,439	Big Ten	PCC, Pac-12	1889			
Washington State	Cougars	Pullman	WA	29,843	Pac-12	PCC, Independent	1893			
West Virginia	Mountaineers	Morgantown	WV	25,474	Big 12	SoCon, WVIAC, Big East	1891			
Western Kentucky	Hilltoppers	Bowling Green	KY	16,750	CUSA	SIAA, KIAC, OVC, MVFC, Sun Belt	1913	2009		–
Western Michigan	Broncos	Kalamazoo	MI	19,038	MAC	MCC	1905	1982	1962	1981
Wisconsin	Badgers	Madison	WI	47,932	Big Ten	None	1889			
Wyoming	Cowboys	Laramie	WY	11,479	Mountain West	CFA, RMAC, WAC	1893			

== Transitioning FBS programs ==
School	Team	City	State	Former conference	Current conference	First played	FBS transition begins	FBS football full membership
North Dakota State	Bison	Fargo	North Dakota	MVFC	Mountain West	1894	2026	2028
Sacramento State	Hornets	Sacramento	California	Big Sky	MAC	1954	2026	2028

== Former programs ==
Team	School	City	State	Former FBS conference	First FBS season	Final FBS season	Subsequent and current status
Alcorn State Braves	Alcorn State University	Lorman	Mississippi	SWAC	1977		FCS
Boston University Terriers	Boston University	Boston	Massachusetts	Independent	1947	1967	College Division; Discontinued
Brown Bears	Brown University	Providence	Rhode Island	Ivy		1981	FCS
Bucknell Bison	Bucknell University	Lewisburg	Pennsylvania	Independent		1947	Small-College; FCS
Cal State Fullerton Titans	California State University, Fullerton	Fullerton	California	Big West	1975	1992	Discontinued
Centenary Gentlemen	Centenary College of Louisiana	Shreveport	Louisiana	LIC	1947		Discontinued; Division III
Chattanooga Mocs	University of Tennessee at Chattanooga	Chattanooga	Tennessee	Southern	1977	1981	FCS
Chicago Maroons	University of Chicago	Chicago	Illinois	Big Ten		1939	Discontinued; Division III
Colgate Raiders	Colgate University	Hamilton	New York	Independent		1981	FCS
Colorado College Tigers	Colorado College	Colorado Springs	Colorado	Rocky Mountain		1947	Small-College; Discontinued
Columbia Lions	Columbia University	Manhattan	New York	Ivy		1981	FCS
Cornell Big Red	Cornell University	Ithaca	New York	Ivy		1981	FCS
Dartmouth Big Green	Dartmouth College	Hanover	New Hampshire	Ivy		1981	FCS
Davidson Wildcats	Davidson College	Davidson	North Carolina	Southern	- 1967	1953; 1976	Division II; FCS
Dayton Flyers	University of Dayton	Dayton	Ohio	Independent	1956	1976	Division III; FCS
Denver Pioneers	University of Denver	Denver	Colorado	Skyline		1960	Discontinued
Detroit Titans	University of Detroit Mercy	Detroit	Michigan	Independent		1964	Discontinued
Drake Bulldogs	Drake University	Des Moines	Iowa	Missouri Valley	1973	1981	FCS
Duquesne Dukes	Duquesne University	Pittsburgh	Pennsylvania	Independent	1947	1950	Discontinued; FCS
East Tennessee State Buccaneers	East Tennessee State University	Johnson City	Tennessee	Southern	1978	1981	FCS
Florida A&M Rattlers (Note: Florida A&M did not complete the FBS transition phase and backed out after the first year.)	Florida A&M University	Tallahassee	Florida	Independent	2004		FCS
Fordham Rams	Fordham University	Bronx	New York	Independent		1954	Discontinued; FCS
Furman Paladins	Furman University	Greenville	South Carolina	Southern	- 1965; 1971	1957; 1965; 1981	FCS
Georgetown Hoyas	Georgetown University	Washington	District of Columbia	Independent		1950	Discontinued; FCS
Grambling State Tigers	Grambling State University	Grambling	Louisiana	SWAC	1977		FCS
Hardin-Simmons Cowboys	Hardin-Simmons University	Abilene	Texas	Independent	- 1950	1948; 1962	College Division; Division III
Harvard Crimson	Harvard University	Cambridge (Note: Harvard's overall administration and undergraduate campus are in Cambridge. However, the athletic department offices and most athletic facilities, including the football stadium, are within the Boston city limits and have a Boston mailing address.)	Massachusetts	Ivy		1981	FCS
Holy Cross Crusaders	College of the Holy Cross	Worcester	Massachusetts	Independent		1981	FCS
Idaho Vandals	University of Idaho	Moscow	Idaho	WAC	- 1969; 1996	1966; 1977; 2017	FCS
Illinois State Redbirds	Illinois State University	Normal	Illinois	Missouri Valley	1976	1981	FCS
Indiana State Sycamores	Indiana State University	Terre Haute	Indiana	Missouri Valley	1976	1981	FCS
Jackson State Tigers	Jackson State University	Jackson	Mississippi	SWAC	1977		FCS
Lafayette Leopards	Lafayette College	Easton	Pennsylvania	Middle Three		1950	Small-College; FCS
Lamar Cardinals	Lamar University	Beaumont	Texas	Southland	1974	1981	FCS
Lehigh Engineers	Lehigh University	Bethlehem	Pennsylvania	Middle Three		1947	Small-College; FCS
Long Beach State 49ers (Note: Long Beach State rebranded its athletic program as "The Beach" effective in 2020–21, long after football was discontinued.)	California State University, Long Beach	Long Beach	California	Big West	1973	1991	Discontinued
Loyola Lions	Loyola Marymount University	Los Angeles	California	Independent	1950	1951	Small-College; Discontinued
Marquette Warriors	Marquette University	Milwaukee	Wisconsin	Independent		1960	Discontinued
McNeese Cowboys (Note: McNeese dropped the word "State" from its athletic branding in 2016. The university's formal name has not changed.)	McNeese State University	Lake Charles	Louisiana	Southland	1975	1981	FCS
Merchant Marine Mariners	United States Merchant Marine Academy	Kings Point	New York	Independent		1947	Small-College; Division III
Montana Grizzlies	University of Montana	Missoula	Montana	Independent		1962	College Division; FCS
Montana State Bobcats	Montana State University	Bozeman	Montana	Rocky Mountain		1948	Small-College; FCS
NYU Violets	New York University	New York	New York	Independent	- 1951	1948; 1952	Discontinued
Northern Arizona Lumberjacks	Northern Arizona University	Flagstaff	Arizona	Border		1947	Small-College; FCS
Northern Colorado Bears	University of Northern Colorado	Greeley	Colorado	Rocky Mountain		1947	Small-College; FCS
Pacific Tigers	University of the Pacific	Stockton	California	Big West	- 1962; 1966; 1969	1960; 1963; 1966; 1995	Discontinued
Penn Quakers	University of Pennsylvania	Philadelphia	Pennsylvania	Ivy		1981	FCS
Princeton Tigers	Princeton University	Princeton	New Jersey	Ivy		1981	FCS
Richmond Spiders	University of Richmond	Richmond	Virginia	Independent		1981	FCS
Southern Illinois Salukis	Southern Illinois University Carbondale	Carbondale	Illinois	Missouri Valley	1973	1981	FCS
Tennessee State Tigers	Tennessee State University	Nashville	Tennessee	Independent	1977	1980	FCS
Texas Arlington Mavericks (Note: The school now brands itself in both athletics and academics as UT Arlington or UTA, although the university's formal name has not changed.)	University of Texas at Arlington	Arlington	Texas	Southland	1972	1981	I-AA; Discontinued
The Citadel Bulldogs	The Citadel	Charleston	South Carolina	Southern	- 1959	1952; 1981	FCS
VMI Keydets	Virginia Military Institute	Lexington	Virginia	Southern		1981	FCS
William & Mary Tribe	College of William & Mary	Williamsburg	Virginia	Independent		1981	FCS
Villanova Wildcats	Villanova University	Villanova	Pennsylvania	Independent		1980	Discontinued; FCS
Western Carolina Catamounts	Western Carolina University	Cullowhee	North Carolina	Southern	1977	1981	FCS
Western Reserve Red Cats	Western Reserve University	Cleveland	Ohio	MAC	1948		Small-College; Division III
West Texas State Buffalos	West Texas State University (Note: West Texas State joined the Texas A&M University System in 1990, and in 1993 the university's name was renamed to West Texas A&M University.)	Canyon	Texas	Missouri Valley	1958	1981	FCS; Division II
Wichita State Shockers	Wichita State University	Wichita	Kansas	Independent		1986	Discontinued
Xavier Musketeers	Xavier University	Cincinnati	Ohio	Independent	1960	1973	Discontinued
Yale Bulldogs	Yale University	New Haven	Connecticut	Ivy		1981	FCS

== See also ==
- List of NCAA Division I FCS football programs
- List of NCAA Division I non-football programs
- List of NCAA Division II football programs
- List of NCAA Division III football programs
- List of NAIA football programs
- List of junior college football programs in the United States

== Notes ==
- Several schools have different athletic nicknames for men's and women's teams. Usually, this is a matter of preceding the main nickname with "Lady", such as LSU Lady Tigers and Tennessee Lady Vols. The two FBS schools nicknamed Cowboys, Oklahoma State and Wyoming, use Cowgirls for women's teams. However, in some cases, the women's team nickname has a completely different form, as in Hawaii Rainbow Wahine and Louisiana Tech Lady Techsters. Because this is a list of American football programs, which are traditionally all-male, only the men's form is given.
- The Pac-12 considers the Pacific Coast Conference or PCC as part of its own history, even though the PCC was established with different charter members and was disbanded due to major crisis and scandal. There is considerable continuity between the two leagues. The Athletic Association of Western Universities (AAWU), which would eventually become the Pac-12, was founded by five former PCC members, and by 1964 all of the final PCC members except for Idaho had been reunited in the AAWU.
- Texas leads the nation with 13 FBS programs based in the state.
