= List of NCAA Division I FCS playoff appearances by team =

The list of current Football Championship Subdivision (FCS) schools that have participated in the playoffs leading to the NCAA Division I Football Championship stands at 92. Known as Division I-AA from 1978 through 2005, it was renamed FCS prior to the 2006 season.

== Field ==
The playoffs began with four teams in 1978, then expanded to eight in 1981, twelve in 1982, and sixteen in 1986. The bracket went to five rounds with a field of twenty teams in 2010, and to 24 teams in 2013.

Years	Teams	Byes
1978–1980	4	
1981	8	
1982–1985	12	4
1986–2009	16	0
2010–2012	20	12
2013–	24	8

- Since the 2010 season, the championship game has been played in January, three weeks after the semifinals.
- An exception was the 2020 season, delayed until spring 2021 due to COVID-19; it had a reduced field of sixteen teams in the bracket, with the championship game in mid-May, eight days after the semifinals.

== Current FCS members ==
- This list reflects FCS membership in the 2026 football season. Teams in **bold** participated in the 2026 fall postseason.

Team	Appearances	First	Last	Wins	Losses	Total	Pct.	Championships
Abilene Christian Wildcats	2	2024	2025	1	1	2	.500	
**Albany Great Danes**	4	2011	2026	2	2	4	.500	
Alcorn State Braves	3	1984	1994	0	3	3	.000	
**Austin Peay Governors**	3	2019	2026	2	2	4	.500	
Bethune–Cookman Wildcats	5	2002	2013	0	5	5	.000	
Butler Bulldogs	1	2013	2013	0	1	1	.000	
Cal Poly Mustangs	4	2005	2016	1	4	5	.200	
Central Arkansas Bears	5	2011	2019	2	5	7	.286	
Central Connecticut Blue Devils	4	2017	2025	0	3	3	.000	
Charleston Southern Buccaneers	1	2015	2015	1	1	2	.500	
Chattanooga Mocs	5	1984	2023	4	5	9	.444	
The Citadel Bulldogs	5	1988	2016	2	5	6	.286	
Colgate Raiders	11	1982	2018	7	11	18	.389	
Davidson Wildcats	3	2020	2022	0	3	3	.000	
**Dayton Flyers**	2	2015	2026	0	1	1	.000	
Delaware State Hornets	1	2007	2007	0	1	1	.000	
Drake Bulldogs	3	2023	2025	0	2	2	.000	
Duquesne Dukes	3	2015	2023	1	3	4	.250	
East Tennessee State Buccaneers	3	1996	2021	2	3	5	.400	
Eastern Illinois Panthers	16	1982	2015	4	16	20	.200	
Eastern Kentucky Colonels	23	1979	2024	16	20	36	.444	1979, 1982
Eastern Washington Eagles	15	1985	2021	20	14	34	.588	2010
Elon Phoenix	4	2009	2022	0	4	4	.000	
Florida A&M Rattlers	8	1978	2021	5	7	12	.417	1978
Fordham Rams	6	2002	2022	3	6	9	.333	
Furman Paladins	20	1982	2023	21	18	39	.538	1988
Gardner–Webb Runnin' Bulldogs	2	2022	2023	1	2	3	.333	
Grambling State Tigers	3	1980	1989	0	3	3	.000	
Hampton Pirates	5	1997	2006	0	5	5	.000	
**Harvard Crimson**	2	2025	2026	0	0	0	–	
Holy Cross Crusaders	6	1983	2022	2	5	7	.286	
Howard Bison	1	1993	1993	0	1	1	.000	
Idaho Vandals	14	1982	2024	7	12	19	.368	
**Idaho State Bengals**	3	1981	2026	3	1	4	.750	1981
**Illinois State Redbirds**	11	1998	2026	10	8	18	.556	
**Incarnate Word Cardinals**	5	2018	2026	2	2	4	.500	
Indiana State Sycamores	3	1983	2014	2	3	5	.400	
Jackson State Tigers	12	1978	1997	0	12	12	.000	
Lafayette Leopards	5	2004	2023	0	5	5	.000	
**Lamar Cardinals**	3	2018	2026	0	1	1	.000	
**Lehigh Mountain Hawks**	14	1979	2026	6	11	17	.353	
**LIU Sharks**	1	2026	2026					
Maine Black Bears	8	1987	2018	5	8	13	.385	
McNeese Cowboys	16	1991	2015	11	16	27	.407	
**Mercer Bears**	4	2023	2026	2	2	4	.500	
Mississippi Valley State Delta Devils	1	1984	1984	0	1	1	.000	
**Monmouth Hawks**	4	2017	2026	1	3	4	.250	
**Montana Grizzlies** (Note: Montana's competition in the 2011 Division I FCS Championship was vacated by action of the NCAA Committee on Infractions (record was 2–1).)	30	1982	2026	38	25	63	.603	1995, 2001
**Montana State Bobcats**	16	1984	2026	17	13	30	.567	1984, 2025
Morgan State Bears	1	2014	2014	0	1	1	.000	
Murray State Racers	5	1979	2002	1	5	6	.167	
New Hampshire Wildcats	19	1991	2025	15	18	33	.455	
Nicholls Colonels	7	1986	2023	3	7	10	.300	
Norfolk State Spartans	1	2011	2011	0	1	1	.000	
North Carolina A&T Aggies	5	1986	2016	1	5	6	.167	
North Carolina Central Eagles	1	2023	2023	0	1	1	.000	
**North Dakota Fighting Hawks**	7	2016	2026	1	5	6	.167	
**Northern Arizona Lumberjacks** (Note: Northern Arizona's competition in the 1999 Division I-AA Championship was vacated by action of the NCAA Committee on Infractions (record was 0–1).)	8	1996	2026	1	6	7	.143	
Northern Iowa Panthers	22	1985	2021	26	22	48	.542	
Northwestern State Demons	6	1988	2004	4	6	10	.400	
Portland State Vikings	2	2000	2015	0	2	2	.000	
Rhode Island Rams	5	1981	2025	3	4	7	.429	
Richmond Spiders	14	1984	2024	17	13	30	.567	2008
Robert Morris Colonials	1	2010	2010	0	1	1	.000	
Sacred Heart Pioneers	4	2013	2021	0	4	4	.000	
Samford Bulldogs	6	1991	2022	3	5	8	.375	
San Diego Toreros	5	2014	2019	2	5	7	.286	
South Carolina State Bulldogs	6	1981	2013	2	6	8	.250	
**South Dakota Coyotes**	6	2017	2026	4	4	8	.500	
**South Dakota State Jackrabbits**	16	2009	2026	24	12	36	.667	2022, 2023
Southeast Missouri State Redhawks	5	2010	2024	1	4	5	.200	
Southeastern Louisiana Lions	6	2013	2025	4	5	9	.444	
Southern Illinois Salukis	11	1983	2023	11	10	21	.524	1983
Southern Utah Thunderbirds	3	2013	2017	0	3	3	.000	
**Stephen F. Austin Lumberjacks** (Note: Stephen F. Austin's competition in the 1989 Division I-AA Championship was vacated by action of the NCAA Committee on Infractions (record was 3–1).)	10	1988	2026	7	8	15	.467	
Stony Brook Seawolves	4	2011	2018	3	4	7	.429	
**Tarleton State Texans**	3	2024	2026	1	1	2	.500	
Tennessee State Tigers (Note: Tennessee State's competition in the 1981 and 1982 Division I-AA Championships was vacated by action of the NCAA Committee on Infractions (record was 1–2).)	5	1986	2024	1	4	5	.200	
**Tennessee Tech Golden Eagles**	3	2011	2026	0	1	1	.000	
Towson Tigers	3	2011	2018	3	3	6	.500	
UC Davis Aggies	4	2018	2025	2	3	5	.333	
UT Martin Skyhawks	3	2006	2024	1	2	3	.333	
Villanova Wildcats	17	1989	2025	14	15	29	.483	2009
VMI Keydets	1	2020	2020	0	1	1	.000	
Wagner Seahawks	1	2012	2012	1	1	2	.500	
**Weber State Wildcats**	11	1987	2026	8	10	18	.444	
Western Carolina Catamounts	1	1983	1983	3	1	4	.750	
**Western Illinois Leathernecks**	12	1988	2026	7	11	18	.389	
William & Mary Tribe	11	1986	2022	8	10	18	.444	
Wofford Terriers	10	2003	2019	9	10	19	.474	
Yale Bulldogs	1	2025	2025	0	0	0	–	
**Youngstown State Penguins**	15	1987	2026	30	9	39	.769	1991, 1993, 1994, 1997

=== No appearances ===
Thirty-six Division I FCS teams have never made the FCS playoffs. Conference alignments are current for the upcoming 2026 season. (Note: According to conferences in football, not necessarily a team's primary conference.)

NCAA Division I FCS school with no playoff appearances
Team	Conference	First Division I-AA or FCS season
Northern Colorado Bears	**Big Sky**	2004
Utah Tech Trailblazers	**Big Sky**	2020
Bryant Bulldogs	**CAA Football** (Note: CAA Football is technically separate from the all-sports Coastal Athletic Association, although both leagues share the same administration.)	2008
Campbell Fighting Camels	**CAA Football**	2008
Chicago State Cougars	**Independent**	2026
Merrimack Warriors	**Independent**	2019
Brown Bears	**Ivy League** (Note: The Ivy League did not participate in the FCS playoffs prior to the 2025 season.)	1982
Columbia Lions	**Ivy League**	1982
Cornell Big Red	**Ivy League**	1982
Dartmouth Big Green	**Ivy League**	1982
Penn Quakers	**Ivy League**	1982
Princeton Tigers	**Ivy League**	1982
Mercyhurst Lakers	**Northeast Conference**	2024 (Note: eligible in 2027)
New Haven Chargers	**Northeast Conference**	2025 (Note: eligible in 2028)
Stonehill Skyhawks	**Northeast Conference**	2022
Lindenwood Lions	**Ohio Valley Conference**	2022
Bucknell Bison	**Patriot League**	1978
Georgetown Hoyas	**Patriot League**	1993
Marist Red Foxes	**Pioneer Football League**	1993
Morehead State Eagles	**Pioneer Football League**	1978
Presbyterian Blue House	**Pioneer Football League**	2011
St. Thomas Tommies	**Pioneer Football League**	2022
Stetson Hatters	**Pioneer Football League**	2013
Valparaiso Beacons	**Pioneer Football League**	1993
East Texas A&M Lions	**Southland Conference**	2022
Houston Christian Huskies	**Southland Conference**	2014
UT Rio Grande Valley Vaqueros	**Southland Conference**	2025
Alabama A&M Bulldogs	**Southwestern Athletic Conference** (Note: The SWAC does not has an auto-bid for FCS Playoffs, due to SWAC champion earn a bid for Celebration Bowl instead. SWAC teams can still earn a at-large bid for FCS Playoffs.)	1999
Alabama State Hornets	**Southwestern Athletic Conference**	1982
Arkansas–Pine Bluff Golden Lions	**Southwestern Athletic Conference**	1998
Prairie View A&M Panthers	**Southwestern Athletic Conference**	1978
Southern Jaguars	**Southwestern Athletic Conference**	1978
Texas Southern Tigers	**Southwestern Athletic Conference**	1978
North Alabama Lions	**United Athletic Conference** (Note: The United Athletic Conference began play in 2023 as a merger of the football leagues of the Atlantic Sun Conference and Western Athletic Conference.)	2018
West Florida Argonauts (Note: eligible in 2029)	**United Athletic Conference**	2026
West Georgia Wolves	**United Athletic Conference**	2024

== Former FCS members ==
Thirty-three former FCS schools have participated in the playoffs. Of these, 29 have moved up to the Football Bowl Subdivision (FBS), one reclassified to Division III, and the other three no longer sponsor football.

Team	Appearances	First	Last	Wins	Losses	Total	Pct.	Championships
Akron Zips^{[FBS]}	1	1985	1985	0	1	1	.000	
Appalachian State Mountaineers^{[FBS]}	20	1986	2012	24	17	41	.585	2005, 2006, 2007
Arkansas State Red Wolves^{[FBS]} (Note: During Arkansas State's entire tenure in Division I-AA (1982–1991), the school nickname was Indians. The Red Wolves nickname was adopted in 2008.)	4	1984	1987	6	4	10	.600	
Boise State Broncos^{[FBS]}	5	1980	1994	8	4	12	.667	1980
Boston University Terriers^{[NF]}	5	1982	1994	2	5	7	.286	
Coastal Carolina Chanticleers^{[FBS]}	6	2006	2015	4	6	10	.400	
Delaware Fightin' Blue Hens^{[FBS]}	19	1981	2023	26	18	44	.591	2003
Florida Atlantic Owls^{[FBS]}	1	2003	2003	2	1	3	.667	
Georgia Southern Eagles^{[FBS]}	19	1985	2012	45	13	58	.776	1985, 1986, 1989; 1990, 1999, 2000
Hofstra Pride^{[NF]}	5	1995	2001	2	5	7	.286	
Jacksonville State Gamecocks^{[FBS]}	10	2003	2020	7	10	17	.412	
James Madison Dukes^{[FBS]}	18	1987	2021	24	16	40	.600	2004, 2016
Kennesaw State Owls^{[FBS]}	4	2017	2021	5	4	9	.556	
Liberty Flames^{[FBS]}	1	2014	2014	1	1	2	.500	
Louisiana–Monroe Warhawks^{[FBS]} (Note: The team was the Northeast Louisiana Indians during its entire tenure in Division I-AA (1982–1993). The school changed its name to the University of Louisiana at Monroe in 1999, and its nickname to Warhawks in 2006.)	4	1987	1993	5	3	8	.625	1987
Louisiana Tech Bulldogs^{[FBS]}	2	1982	1984	4	2	6	.667	
Marshall Thundering Herd^{[FBS]}	8	1987	1996	23	6	29	.793	1992, 1996
Middle Tennessee Blue Raiders^{[FBS]}	7	1984	1994	6	7	13	.462	
Missouri State Bears^{[FBS]}	4	1989	2021	1	4	5	.200	
Nevada Wolf Pack^{[FBS]}	7	1978	1991	9	7	16	.563	
North Dakota State Bison^{[FBS]}	15	2010	2025	51	5	56	.911	2011, 2012, 2013, 2014, 2015, 2017, 2018, 2019, 2021, 2024
North Texas Mean Green^{[FBS]}	4	1983	1994	0	4	4	.000	
Northeastern Huskies^{[NF]}	1	2002	2002	0	1	1	.000	
Old Dominion Monarchs^{[FBS]}	2	2011	2012	2	2	4	.500	
Sacramento State Hornets^{[FBS]}	4	2019	2023	2	4	6	.333	
Saint Francis Red Wolves^{[D3]} (Note: During Saint Francis' entire FCS tenure (1993–2025), the school nickname was the Red Flash. The Red Wolves nickname was adopted in 2026.)	2	2016	2022	0	2	2	.000	
Sam Houston Bearkats^{[FBS]} (Note: The program was officially branded as "Sam Houston State" for almost all of its FCS tenure. The word "State" was dropped from the athletic branding, but not the university name, in 2020.)	13	1986	2021	24	12	36	.667	2020
Texas State Bobcats^{[FBS]}	2	2005	2008	2	2	4	.500	
Troy Trojans^{[FBS]} (Note: During Troy's entire tenure in Division I-AA (1993–2001), its name was Troy State University. The school adopted its current name in 2005.)	7	1993	2000	5	7	12	.417	
UCF Knights^{[FBS]}	2	1990	1993	2	2	4	.500	
UConn Huskies^{[FBS]} (Note: The program was officially branded as "Connecticut" before 2013 (well after its move to FBS), though "UConn" was widely used informally before that time.)	1	1998	1998	1	1	2	.500	
UMass Minutemen^{[FBS]}	8	1978	2007	10	7	17	.588	1998
Western Kentucky Hilltoppers^{[FBS]}	8	1987	2004	8	7	15	.533	2002

== See also ==
- List of NCAA Division I FCS football programs
- List of NCAA Division I FBS football bowl records
- List of NCAA Division II Football Championship appearances by team
- List of NCAA Division III Football Championship appearances by team
- List of NAIA national football championship series appearances by team

== Notes ==
=== Program changes ===
- ^{FBS} Program has since joined Division I FBS.
- ^{D3} Program has since joined Division III.
- ^{NF} Program remains in Division I, but no longer sponsors football.
