= List of NCAA Division II ice hockey programs =

The following is a list of the 6 schools who field men's ice hockey teams in NCAA Division II competition.

== History ==
Second-tier ice hockey has twice collapsed since 1980. Its current iteration is solely a result of the NCAA policy barring Division II schools from participating in Division III tournament which would have prevented those conferences from receiving an automatic bid into the national tournament. Because only six schools play at the D-II level, no NCAA tournament is currently held as of 2025. A seventh school, Stonehill, left the D-II ranks in July 2022 when it moved its athletic program to the Division I Northeast Conference. American International left Division I hockey in 2025, and intends to compete in Division II in the future, increasing the number of teams to seven. However, American International did not field a team for the 2025–26 season. Several other NCAA Division II schools compete in NCAA Division I ice hockey.

The teams comprising the Division II level played in Division III conferences until 2009 but have been playing their conference tournaments since 2000.

== Men ==
| School | Team | City | State | Current Conference | Primary Conference | First Played | Joined Div II | Conference Championships |
|---|---|---|---|---|---|---|---|---|
| Assumption University | Greyhounds | Worcester | Massachusetts | Northeast-10 Conference | Northeast-10 Conference | 1964 | 2009^{A} | (2) 2017, 2022 |
| Franklin Pierce University | Ravens | Rindge | New Hampshire | Northeast-10 Conference | Northeast-10 Conference | 2002 | 2009 | (0) |
| Post University | Eagles | Waterbury | Connecticut | Northeast-10 Conference | CACC | 2016 | 2016 | (0) |
| Saint Anselm College | Hawks | Goffstown | New Hampshire | Northeast-10 Conference | Northeast-10 Conference | 1969 | 2017^{A} ^{B} | (10) 2000, 2001, 2005, 2006, 2010, 2011, 2012, 2013, 2015, 2018 |
| Saint Michael's College | Purple Knights | Colchester | Vermont | Northeast-10 Conference | Northeast-10 Conference | 1982 | 2017^{A} ^{B} | (6) 2002, 2003, 2004, 2008, 2009, 2025 |
| Southern New Hampshire University | Penmen | Manchester | New Hampshire | Northeast-10 Conference | Northeast-10 Conference | 1975 | 2009 | (2) 2014, 2019 |

=== Notes ===
^A Teams previously played at the Division II level until 1984.
^B Saint Anselm and Saint Michael's were jointly members of Division II and III conferences from 2009 to 2017.

- As of 2023–24, no women's ice hockey programs operate at the Division II level. Five of the six D-II men's ice hockey schools (Assumption, Franklin Pierce, Post, Saint Anselm, Saint Michael's) field women's varsity teams; all compete in the New England Women's Hockey Alliance, a fully recognized league at the National Collegiate level (the de facto equivalent of Division I).

== See also ==
- List of NCAA Division I ice hockey programs
- List of NCAA Division III ice hockey programs
- List of NCAA Division II institutions
