= List of NCAA Division III ice hockey programs =

The following is a list of the 91 schools that currently field men's ice hockey teams and the 83 schools that currently field women's ice hockey teams in NCAA Division III competition.

== Men ==
School	Team	City	State	Current conference	Primary conference	First played	Joined Div. III^{A}	NCAA Tournament appearances^{E}	National championships
Adrian College	Bulldogs	Adrian	Michigan	NCHA	MIAA	2007	2007	(12) 2010, 2011, 2013, 2014, 2015, 2016, 2017, 2018, 2020, 2022, 2023, 2024	(1) 2022
Albertus Magnus College	Falcons	New Haven	Connecticut	UCHC	GNAC	2019	2019	(0)	(0)
Albright College	Lions	Reading	Pennsylvania	MAC	MAC Commonwealth	2026	2026		
Alvernia University	Golden Wolves	Reading	Pennsylvania	MAC	MAC Commonwealth	2022	2022	(0)	(0)
Amherst College	Mammoths	Amherst	Massachusetts	NESCAC	NESCAC	1908	1983	(4) 1999, 2009, 2012, 2015	(0)
Arcadia University	Knights	Glenside	Pennsylvania	MAC	MAC Freedom	2021	2021	(0)	(0)
Augsburg University	Auggies	Minneapolis	Minnesota	MIAC	MIAC	2001	2001	(6) 2016, 2017, 2018, 2019, 2022, 2023	(0)
Aurora University	Spartans	Aurora	Illinois	NCHA	NACC	2014	2014	(2) 2025, 2026	(0)
Babson College	Beavers	Wellesley	Massachusetts	Little East	NEWMAC	1965	1983	(16) 1984, 1985, 1986, 1987, 1988, 1989, 1990, 1991, 1992, 1993, 2007, 2009, 2013, 2014, 2020, 2022	(1) 1984
Beloit College	Buccaneers	Beloit	Wisconsin	WIAC	Midwest	2025	2025	(0)	(0)
Bethel University	Royals	Arden Hills	Minnesota	MIAC	MIAC	1979	1983	(1) 2007	(0)
Bowdoin College	Polar Bears	Brunswick	Maine	NESCAC	NESCAC	1919	1983	(7) 1996, 2002, 2010, 2011, 2013, 2014, 2023	(0)
Buffalo State University	Bengals	Buffalo	New York	SUNYAC	SUNYAC	1993	1993	(0)	(0)
Chatham University	Cougars	Pittsburgh	Pennsylvania	UCHC	PAC	2017	2017	(0)	(0)
Colby College	Mules	Waterville	Maine	NESCAC	NESCAC	1995	1995	(2) 1996, 2018	(0)
Concordia College	Cobbers	Moorhead	Minnesota	MIAC	MIAC	1927	1983	(2) 1987, 1999	(0)
Concordia University Wisconsin	Falcons	Mequon	Wisconsin	NCHA	NACC	2007	2007	(0)	(0)
Connecticut College	Camels	New London	Connecticut	NESCAC	NESCAC	1980	1983	(0)	(0)
Curry College	Colonels	Milton	Massachusetts	CNE	CNE	1974	1983	(6) 2005, 2010, 2011, 2023, 2024, 2025	(0)
University of Dubuque	Spartans	Dubuque	Iowa	NCHA	ARC	2023	2023	(0)	(0)
Endicott College	Gulls	Beverly	Massachusetts	CNE	CNE	2015	2015	(5) 2017, 2020, 2023, 2024, 2026	(0)
Elmira College	Soaring Eagles	Elmira	New York	UCHC	Empire 8	1975	1983	(17) 1986, 1988, 1990, 1991, 1992, 1993, 1994, 1997, 2003, 2006, 2008, 2009, 2010, 2011, 2012, 2022, 2024	(0)
Fitchburg State University	Falcons	Fitchburg	Massachusetts	MASCAC	MASCAC	1934	1983	(2) 2018, 2025	(0)
Framingham State University	Rams	Framingham	Massachusetts	MASCAC	MASCAC	1971	1983	(0)	(0)
Gustavus Adolphus College	Golden Gusties	St. Peter	Minnesota	MIAC	MIAC	1936	1983	(7) 1990, 1991, 1993, 2009, 2010, 2012, 2025	(0)
Hamilton College	Continentals	Clinton	New York	NESCAC	NESCAC	1918	1983	(3) 2017, 2025, 2026	(1) 2026
Hamline University	Pipers	Saint Paul	Minnesota	MIAC	MIAC	2001	2001	(2) 2011, 2015	(0)
Hiram College	Terriers	Hiram	Ohio	Independent	PAC	2025	2025	(0)	(0)
Hobart College	Statesmen	Geneva	New York	SUNYAC	Liberty	1970	1983	(15) 2004, 2006, 2008, 2009, 2014, 2016, 2017, 2018, 2019, 2020, 2022, 2023, 2024, 2025, 2026	(3) 2023, 2024, 2025
Johnson and Wales University	Wildcats	Providence	Rhode Island	CNE	CNE	1997	1997	(0)	(0)
Keene State College	Owls	Keene	New Hampshire	Little East	Little East	1983^{F}	2024	(0)	(0)
King's College	Monarchs	Wilkes-Barre	Pennsylvania	MAC	MAC Freedom	2017	2017	(0)	(0)
Lake Forest College	Foresters	Lake Forest	Illinois	NCHA	Midwest	1965	1983	(2) 1991, 2020	(0)
Lawrence University	Vikings	Appleton	Wisconsin	NCHA	Midwest	1986	1986	(0)	(0)
Lebanon Valley College	Flying Dutchmen	Annville	Pennsylvania	MAC	MAC Commonwealth	1998	2016^{C}	(0)	(0)
Manhattanville University	Valiants	Purchase	New York	UCHC	Skyline	1999	1999	(5) 2005, 2006, 2007, 2008, 2019	(0)
Marian University	Sabres	Fond du Lac	Wisconsin	NCHA	NACC	1995	1995	(1) 2018	(0)
University of Massachusetts Boston	Beacons	Dorchester	Massachusetts	Little East	Little East	1980	1983	(2) 2016, 2019	(0)
University of Massachusetts Dartmouth	Corsairs	Dartmouth	Massachusetts	Little East	Little East	1974	1983	(4) 2006, 2007, 2008, 2013	(0)
Massachusetts College of Liberal Arts	Trailblazers	North Adams	Massachusetts	MASCAC	MASCAC	2023	2023	(0)	(0)
Middlebury College	Panthers	Middlebury	Vermont	NESCAC	NESCAC	1922	1983	(14) 1995, 1996, 1997, 1998, 1999, 2000, 2001, 2002, 2003, 2004, 2005, 2006, 2007, 2010	(8) 1995, 1996, 1997, 1998, 1999, 2004, 2005, 2006
Milwaukee School of Engineering	Raiders	Milwaukee	Wisconsin	NCHA	NACC	2001	2001	(1) 2012	(0)
Misericordia University	Cougars	Dallas	Pennsylvania	MAC	MAC Freedom	2024	2024	(0)	(0)
Nazareth University	Golden Flyers	Rochester	New York	UCHC	Empire 8	2012	2012	(0)	(0)
Neumann University	Knights	Aston	Pennsylvania	MAC	CSAC	1998	1998	(3) 2009, 2011, 2026	(1) 2009
University of New England	Nor'easters	Biddeford	Maine	CNE	CNE	2009	2009	(6) 2018, 2019, 2022, 2023, 2025, 2026	(0)
New England College	Pilgrims	Henniker	New Hampshire	Little East	NAC	1969	1983	(3) 1984, 2001, 2005	(0)
Nichols College	Bison	Dudley	Massachusetts	CNE	CNE	1931	1983	(4) 2009, 2014, 2015, 2018	(0)
Norwich University	Cadets	Northfield	Vermont	Little East	GNAC	1925	1983	(21) 1987, 1997, 1999, 2000, 2002, 2003, 2004, 2006, 2007, 2008, 2010, 2011, 2012, 2013, 2014, 2015, 2017, 2019, 2020, 2023, 2026	(4) 2000, 2003, 2010, 2017
Plymouth State University	Panthers	Plymouth	New Hampshire	Little East	Little East	1971	1983	(7) 2011, 2015, 2019, 2020, 2022, 2023, 2024	(0)
Rivier University	Raiders	Nashua	New Hampshire	MASCAC	GNAC	2021	2021	(0)	(0)
Roger Williams University	Hawks	Bristol	Rhode Island	CNE	CNE	2025	2025	(0)	(0)
Saint John's University	Johnnies	Collegeville	Minnesota	MIAC	MIAC	1920	1983	(7) 1996, 1997, 2001, 2003, 2005, 2013, 2026	(0)
St. John Fisher University	Cardinals	Pittsford	New York	UCHC	Empire 8	2025	2025	(0)	(0)
University of Saint Joseph	Blue Jays	West Hartford	Connecticut	MASCAC	GNAC	2026	2026	(0)	(0)
St. Mary’s University	Cardinals	Winona	Minnesota	MIAC	MIAC	1928	1983	(2) 1989, 1994	(0)
St. Norbert College	Green Knights	De Pere	Wisconsin	NCHA	NACC	1988	1988	(23) 1997, 1998, 1999, 2002, 2003, 2004, 2005, 2006, 2007, 2008, 2010, 2011, 2012, 2013, 2014, 2016, 2017, 2018, 2019, 2022, 2024, 2025, 2026	(5) 2008, 2011, 2012, 2014, 2018
St. Olaf College	Oles	Northfield	Minnesota	MIAC	MIAC	1927	1983	(3) 2006, 2022, 2024	(0)
College of St. Scholastica	Saints	Duluth	Minnesota	MIAC	MIAC	1972	1983	(1) 2009	(0)
Salem State University	Vikings	Salem	Massachusetts	MASCAC	MASCAC	1961	1983	(9) 1985, 1987, 1992, 1993, 1994, 1995, 2014, 2016, 2017	(0)
Salve Regina University	Seahawks	Newport	Rhode Island	CNE	NEWMAC	1997	1997	(3) 2016, 2018, 2026	(0)
Skidmore College	Thoroughbreds	Saratoga Springs	New York	SUNYAC	Liberty	1982	1983	(0)	(0)
University of Southern Maine	Huskies	Portland	Maine	Little East	Little East	1972	1983	(0)	(0)
State University of New York at Brockport	Golden Eagles	Brockport	New York	UCHC	Empire 8	1973	1983	(0)	(0)
State University of New York at Canton	Kangaroos	Canton	New York	SUNYAC	SUNYAC	2012	2012	(0)	(0)
State University of New York at Cortland	Red Dragons	Cortland	New York	SUNYAC	SUNYAC	2001	2001	(1) 2024	(0)
State University of New York at Fredonia	Blue Devils	Fredonia	New York	SUNYAC	SUNYAC	1987	1987	(3) 1994, 1995, 2007	(0)
State University of New York at Geneseo	Knights	Geneseo	New York	UCHC	Empire 8	1975	1983	(11) 1990, 2005, 2006, 2014, 2016, 2018, 2019, 2020, 2022, 2024, 2025	(0)
State University of New York at Morrisville	Mustangs	Morrisville	New York	SUNYAC	SUNYAC	2006	2006	(0)	(0)
State University of New York at Oswego	Lakers	Oswego	New York	SUNYAC	SUNYAC	1966	1983	(17) 1984, 1987, 1988, 1989, 1991, 1998, 2003, 2007, 2010, 2011, 2012, 2013, 2014, 2015, 2017, 2019, 2025	(1) 2007
State University of New York at Plattsburgh	Cardinals	Plattsburgh	New York	SUNYAC	SUNYAC	1975	1983	(23) 1985, 1986*, 1987*, 1988, 1990, 1992, 1993, 1995, 1997, 1998, 1999, 2000, 2001, 2002, 2004, 2008, 2009, 2010, 2011, 2012, 2015, 2017, 2023	(3) 1987*, 1992, 2001 ^{B}
State University of New York at Potsdam	Bears	Potsdam	New York	SUNYAC	SUNYAC	1976	1983	(1) 1996	(0)
Stevenson University	Mustangs	Stevenson	Maryland	MAC	MAC Commonwealth	2016	2016	(1) 2025	(0)
Suffolk University	Rams	Boston	Massachusetts	CNE	CNE	1980	1983	(0)	(0)
Trine University	Thunder	Angola	Indiana	NCHA	MIAA	2017	2017	(1) 2025	(0)
Trinity College	Bantams	Hartford	Connecticut	NESCAC	NESCAC	1974	1983	(9) 2003, 2005, 2008, 2015, 2016, 2017, 2019, 2022, 2024	(1) 2015
Tufts University	Jumbos	Medford	Massachusetts	NESCAC	NESCAC	1917	1983	(0)	(0)
Utica University	Pioneers	Utica	New York	UCHC	Empire 8	2001	2001	(7) 2013, 2020, 2022, 2023, 2024, 2025, 2026	(0)
Vermont State University Castleton	Spartans	Castleton	Vermont	Little East	Little East	2003	2003	(0)	(0)
Wentworth Institute of Technology	Leopards	Boston	Massachusetts	CNE	CNE	1992	1992	(6) 2000, 2002, 2003, 2004, 2012, 2013	(0)
Wesleyan University	Cardinals	Middletown	Connecticut	NESCAC	NESCAC	1971	1983	(1) 2020	(0)
Western Connecticut State University	Wolves	Danbury	Connecticut	Little East	Little East	2025	2025	(0)	(0)
Western New England University	Golden Bears	Springfield	Massachusetts	CNE	CNE	1980	1983	(0)	(0)
Westfield State University	Owls	Westfield	Massachusetts	MASCAC	MASCAC	1974	2008^{D}	(0)	(0)
Wilkes University	Colonels	Wilkes-Barre	Pennsylvania	MAC	Landmark Conference	2018	2018	(0)	(0)
Williams College	Ephs	Williamstown	Massachusetts	NESCAC	NESCAC	1902	1983	(2) 2016, 2026	(0)
University of Wisconsin–Eau Claire	Blugolds	Eau Claire	Wisconsin	WIAC	WIAC	1977	1983	(4) 1989, 2013, 2020, 2025	(1) 2013
University of Wisconsin–River Falls	Falcons	River Falls	Wisconsin	WIAC	WIAC	1964	1983	(11) 1984, 1988, 1993, 1994, 1995, 1996, 1998, 2001, 2003, 2004, 2007	(2) 1988, 1994
University of Wisconsin–Stevens Point	Pointers	Stevens Point	Wisconsin	WIAC	WIAC	1981	1983	(16) 1989, 1990, 1991, 1992, 1993, 1994, 1995, 1998, 2014, 2015, 2016, 2017, 2018, 2019, 2023, 2024	(6) 1989, 1990, 1991, 1993, 2016, 2019
University of Wisconsin–Stout	Blue Devils	Menomonie	Wisconsin	WIAC	WIAC	1968	1983	(3) 2008, 2009, 2026	(0)
University of Wisconsin–Superior	Yellowjackets	Superior	Wisconsin	WIAC	UMAC	1965	1983	(12) 1992, 1993, 1994, 1995, 1996, 1997, 1999, 2000, 2001, 2002, 2006, 2009	(1) 2002
Worcester State University	Lancers	Worcester	Massachusetts	MASCAC	MASCAC	1966	1983	(0)	(0)

=== Future teams ===
School	Team	City	State	Future conference	Primary conference	First playing	Joining Div 3^{A}
Saint Anselm College	Hawks	Goffstown	NH	Little East	NEWMAC	2027	2027

=== Notes ===
^A The NCAA began sponsoring Division III hockey as a championship sport in the 1983–84 season.
^B SUNY Plattsburgh's 1987 national championship was vacated by the NCAA Committee on Infractions. (No championship was awarded that year.)
^C Lebanon Valley previously competed in Division III from 1998–2010. The school dropped varsity hockey in 2010, competing at the ACHA Division I club level until 2016 when it re-elevated its men's team and added women's hockey.
^D Westfield State dropped its program from 1989 to 2008.
^E In 2020, the 12-team field was selected but the tournament was not played due to the COVID-19 pandemic.
^F Keene State previously competed in Division III from 1983 to 1986. The school dropped varsity hockey in 1986 but recreated its men's team and added women's hockey, both in 2024.

== Women ==
School	Team	City	State	Current conference	Primary conference	First played	Joined Div. III^{A}	NCAA Tournament appearances	National championships
Adrian College	Bulldogs	Adrian	Michigan	NCHA	MIAA	2007	2007	(6) 2011, 2016, 2017, 2018, 2019, 2020	(0)
Albertus Magnus College	Falcons	New Haven	Connecticut	UCHC	GNAC	2023	2023	(0)	(0)
Alvernia University	Golden Wolves	Reading	Pennsylvania	UCHC	MAC Commonwealth	2019	2019	(0)	(0)
Amherst College	Mammoths	Amherst	Massachusetts	NESCAC	NESCAC	1995	2001	(8) 2007, 2008, 2009, 2010, 2012, 2016, 2020, 2025	(2) 2009, 2010
Arcadia University	Knights	Glenside	Pennsylvania	UCHC	MAC Freedom	2021	2021	(0)	(0)
Augsburg University	Auggies	Minneapolis	Minnesota	MIAC	MIAC	1995	2001	(1) 2025	(0)
Aurora University	Spartans	Aurora	Illinois	NCHA	NACC	2017	2017	(1) 2022	(0)
Beloit College	Buccaneers	Beloit	Wisconsin	WIAC	Midwest	2025	2025	(0)	(0)
Bethel University	Royals	Arden Hills	Minnesota	MIAC	MIAC	1999	2001	(0)	(0)
Bowdoin College	Polar Bears	Brunswick	Maine	NESCAC	NESCAC	1984	2001	(5) 2002, 2003, 2004, 2005, 2013	(0)
Buffalo State University	Bengals	Buffalo	New York	SUNYAC	SUNYAC	1999	2001	(0)	(0)
Chatham University	Cougars	Pittsburgh	Pennsylvania	UCHC	PAC	2002	2002	(0)	(0)
Colby College	White Mules	Waterville	Maine	NESCAC	NESCAC	2001	2001	(2) 2022, 2025	(0)
Concordia College	Cobbers	Moorhead	Minnesota	MIAC	MIAC	1999	2001	(1) 2012	(0)
Concordia University Wisconsin	Falcons	Mequon	Wisconsin	NCHA	NAC	2007	2007	(0)	(0)
Connecticut College	Camels	New London	Connecticut	NESCAC	NESCAC	1997	2001	(0)	(0)
Curry College	Colonels	Milton	Massachusetts	CNE	CNE	2021	2021	(0)	(0)
University of Dubuque	Spartans	Dubuque	Iowa	NCHA	ARC	2023	2023	(0)	(0)
Elmira College	Soaring Eagles	Elmira	New York	UCHC	Empire 8	2001	2001	(18) 2002, 2003, 2004, 2005, 2006, 2008, 2009, 2010, 2013, 2014, 2015, 2016, 2017, 2018, 2019, 2020, 2022, 2025	(3) 2002, 2003, 2013
Endicott College	Gulls	Beverly	Massachusetts	CNE	CNE	2015	2015	(4) 2019, 2020, 2022, 2025	(0)
Framingham State University	Rams	Framingham	Massachusetts	MASCAC	MASCAC	2024	2024	(0)	(0)
Gustavus Adolphus College	Golden Gusties	St. Peter	Minnesota	MIAC	MIAC	1997	2001	(16) 2002, 2004, 2005, 2006, 2007, 2008, 2009, 2010, 2011, 2012, 2013, 2017, 2018, 2020, 2022, 2025	(0)
Hamilton College	Continentals	Clinton	New York	NESCAC	NESCAC	1996	2001	(0)	(0)
Hamline University	Pipers	St. Paul	Minnesota	MIAC	MIAC	2000	2001	(2) 2018, 2019	(0)
Hilbert College	Hawks	Hamburg	New York	UCHC	AMCC	2022	2022	(0)	(0)
Hiram College	Terriers	Hiram	Ohio	Independent	PAC	2026	2026	(0)	(0)
Johnson and Wales University	Wildcats	Providence	Rhode Island	CNE	CNE	2015	2015	(0)	(0)
Keene State College	Owls	Keene	New Hampshire	Little East	Little East	2024	2024	(0)	(0)
King's College	Monarchs	Wilkes-Barre	Pennsylvania	UCHC	MAC Freedom	2017	2017	(0)	(0)
Lake Forest College	Foresters	Lake Forest	Illinois	NCHA	Midwest	2000	2001	(2) 2014, 2015	(0)
Lawrence University	Vikings	Appleton	Wisconsin	NCHA	Midwest	2021	2021	(0)	(0)
Lebanon Valley College	Flying Dutchmen	Annville	Pennsylvania	UCHC	MAC Commonwealth	2016	2016	(0)	(0)
Manhattanville University	Valiants	Purchase	New York	UCHC	Skyline	1999	2001	(8) 2002, 2003, 2004, 2005, 2006, 2007, 2008, 2011	(0)
Marian University	Sabres	Fond du Lac	Wisconsin	NCHA	NAC	2009	2009	(0)	(0)
University of Massachusetts Boston	Beacons	Dorchester	Massachusetts	Little East	Little East	2003	2003	(1) 2016	(0)
Massachusetts College of Liberal Arts	Trailblazers	North Adams	Massachusetts	MASCAC	MASCAC	2023	2023	(0)	(0)
Middlebury College	Panthers	Middlebury	Vermont	NESCAC	NESCAC	1981	2001	(18) 2002, 2003, 2004, 2005, 2006, 2007, 2008, 2009, 2011, 2012, 2013, 2015, 2016, 2017, 2018, 2020, 2022, 2025	(4) 2004, 2005, 2006, 2022
Milwaukee School of Engineering	Raiders	Milwaukee	Wisconsin	NCHA	NACC	2024	2024	(0)	(0)
Nazareth University	Golden Flyers	Pittsford	New York	UCHC	Empire 8	2018	2018	(2) 2022, 2025	(0)
Neumann University	Knights	Aston	Pennsylvania	UCHC	CSAC	2001	2001	(0)	(0)
University of New England	Nor'easters	Biddeford	Maine	CNE	CNE	2012	2012	(0)	(0)
New England College	Pilgrims	Henniker	New Hampshire	Little East	NAC	2001	2001	(0)	(0)
Nichols College	Bison	Dudley	Massachusetts	CNE	CNE	2008	2008	(0)	(0)
Norwich University	Cadets	Northfield	Vermont	Little East	GNAC	2007	2007	(11) 2009, 2010, 2011, 2012, 2013, 2014, 2015, 2017, 2018, 2019, 2020	(2) 2011, 2018
Plymouth State University	Panthers	Plymouth	New Hampshire	Little East	Little East	2006	2006	(0)	(0)
Rivier University	Raiders	Nashua	New Hampshire	MASCAC	GNAC	2021	2021	(0)	(0)
Roger Williams University	Hawks	Bristol	Rhode Island	CNE	CNE	2026	2026	(0)	(0)
College of Saint Benedict	Blazers	St. Joseph	Minnesota	MIAC	MIAC	1997	2001	(0)	(0)
St. Catherine University	Wildcats	St. Paul	Minnesota	MIAC	MIAC	1998	2001	(0)	(0)
St. John Fisher University	Cardinals	Pittsford	New York	UCHC	Empire 8	2025	2025	(0)	(0)
University of Saint Joseph	Blue Jays	West Hartford	Connecticut	MASCAC	GNAC	2026	2026	(0)	(0)
St. Mary’s University	Cardinals	Winona	Minnesota	MIAC	MIAC	1998	2001	(1) 2002	(0)
St. Norbert College	Green Knights	De Pere	Wisconsin	NCHA	Midwest	2010	2010	(2) 2013, 2025	(0)
St. Olaf College	Oles	Northfield	Minnesota	MIAC	MIAC	2000	2001	(0)	(0)
College of St. Scholastica	Saints	Duluth	Minnesota	MIAC	MIAC	2010	2010	(0)	(0)
Salem State University	Vikings	Salem	Massachusetts	MASCAC	MASCAC	2015	2015	(0)	(0)
Salve Regina University	Seahawks	Newport	Rhode Island	CNE	NEWMAC	1999	2001	(0)	(0)
University of Southern Maine	Huskies	Portland	Maine	Little East	Little East	1998	2001	(0)	(0)
Stevenson University	Mustangs	Stevenson	Maryland	UCHC	MAC	2012	2012	(0)	(0)
Suffolk University	Rams	Boston	Massachusetts	CNE	CNE	2018	2018	(0)	(0)
State University of New York at Canton	Kangaroos	Canton	New York	SUNYAC	SUNYAC	2015	2015	(0)	(0)
State University of New York at Cortland	Red Dragons	Cortland	New York	SUNYAC	SUNYAC	2000	2001	(0)	(0)
State University of New York at Morrisville	Mustangs	Morrisville	New York	SUNYAC	SUNYAC	2015	2015	(1) 2018	(0)
State University of New York at Oswego	Lakers	Oswego	New York	SUNYAC	SUNYAC	2006	2006	(0)	(0)
State University of New York at Plattsburgh	Cardinals	Plattsburgh	New York	SUNYAC	SUNYAC	2001	2001	(18) 2004, 2005, 2006, 2007, 2008, 2009, 2010, 2012, 2013, 2014, 2015, 2016, 2017, 2018, 2019, 2020, 2022, 2025	(7) 2007, 2008, 2014, 2015, 2016, 2017, 2019
State University of New York at Potsdam	Bears	Potsdam	New York	SUNYAC	SUNYAC	2008	2008	(0)	(0)
Trine University	Thunder	Angola	Indiana	NCHA	MIAA	2017	2017	(0)	(0)
Trinity College	Bantams	Hartford	Connecticut	NESCAC	NESCAC	1998	2001	(2) 2010, 2015	(0)
Utica University	Pioneers	Utica	New York	UCHC	Empire 8	2001	2001	(0)	(0)
Vermont State University Castleton	Spartans	Castleton	Vermont	Little East	Little East	2004	2004	(0)	(0)
Wesleyan University	Cardinals	Middletown	Connecticut	NESCAC	NESCAC	1996	2001	(0)	(0)
Western Connecticut State University	Wolves	Danbury	Connecticut	Little East	Little East	2026	2026	(0)	(0)
Western New England University	Golden Bears	Springfield	Massachusetts	CNE	CNE	2021	2021	(0)	(0)
Wilkes University	Colonels	Wilkes-Barre	Pennsylvania	UCHC	MAC Freedom	2017	2017	(1) 2025	(0)
Williams College	Ephs	Williamstown	Massachusetts	NESCAC	NESCAC	1999	1999	(3) 2003, 2014, 2019	(0)
William Smith College	Herons	Geneva	New York	SUNYAC	Liberty League	2014	2014	(0)	(0)
University of Wisconsin–Eau Claire	Blugolds	Eau Claire	Wisconsin	WIAC	WIAC	2000	2001	(4) 2018, 2019, 2020, 2022	(0)
University of Wisconsin–River Falls	Falcons	River Falls	Wisconsin	WIAC	WIAC	1999	2001	(15) 2003, 2009, 2010, 2011, 2012, 2013, 2014, 2015, 2016, 2017, 2019, 2020, 2022, 2024, 2025	(2) 2024, 2025
University of Wisconsin–Stevens Point	Pointers	Stevens Point	Wisconsin	WIAC	WIAC	2000	2001	(5) 2004, 2005, 2006, 2007, 2014	(0)
University of Wisconsin–Superior	Yellowjackets	Superior	Wisconsin	WIAC	UMAC	2001	2001	(2) 2006, 2008	(0)
Worcester State University	Lancers	Milton	Massachusetts	MASCAC	MASCAC	2021	2021	(0)	(0)

=== Future teams ===
School	Team	City	State	Future conference	Primary conference	First playing	Joining Div 3^{A}
Fitchburg State University	Falcons	Fitchburg	MA	MASCAC	MASCAC	2027	2027
Saint Anselm College	Hawks	Goffstown	NH	Little East	NEWMAC	2027	2027

=== Notes ===
^A The NCAA began sponsoring Division III women's hockey as a championship sport in the 2001–02 season.

== See also ==
- List of NCAA ice hockey programs
- List of NCAA Division I ice hockey programs
- List of NCAA Division II ice hockey programs
- List of NCAA Division III institutions
- List of NCAA Division III football programs
