= List of NCAA Division I FCS football programs =

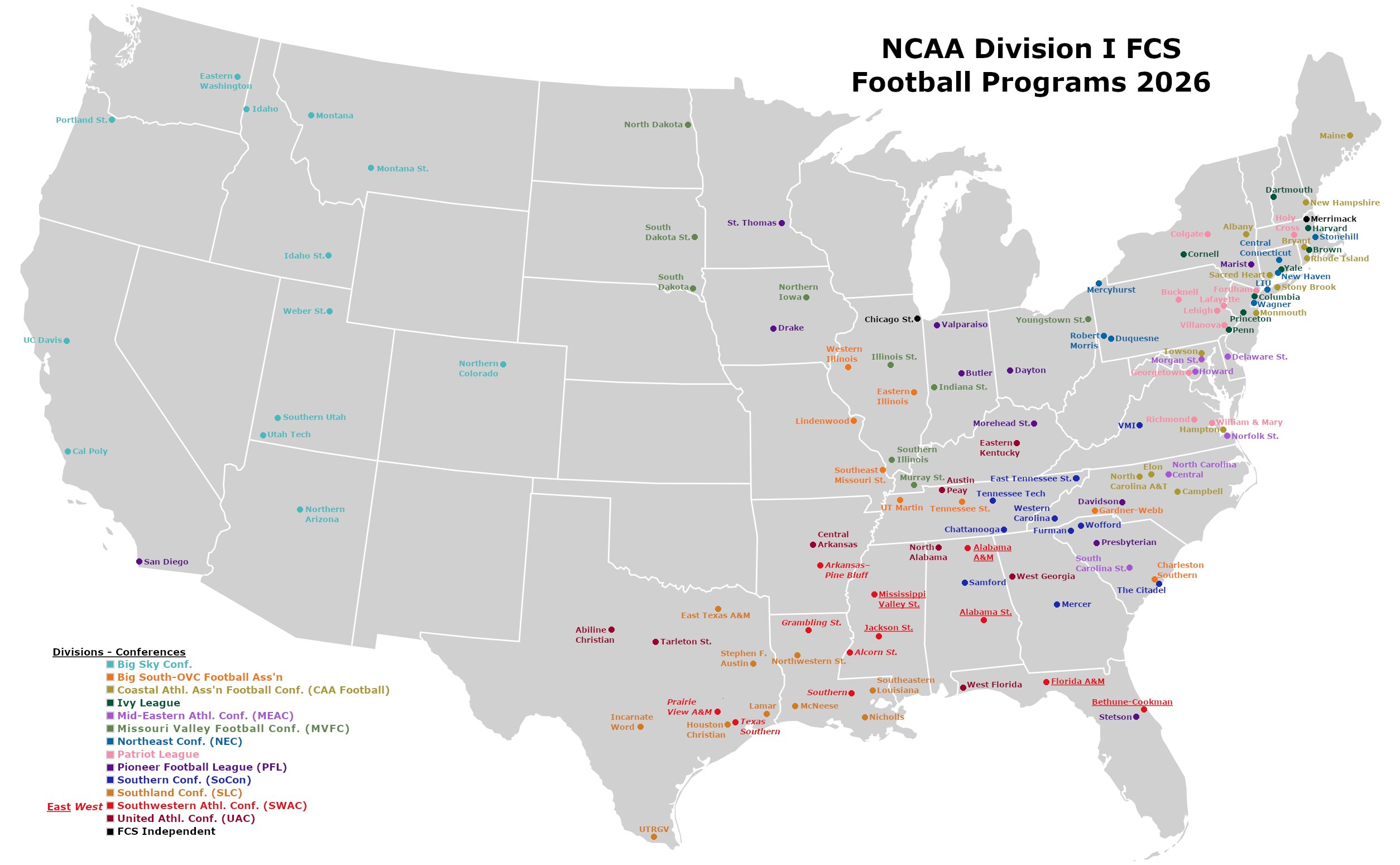
Map of the FCS football programs, 2026

This is a list of schools in Division I of the National Collegiate Athletic Association (NCAA) that play football in the United States as a varsity sport and are members of the Football Championship Subdivision (FCS), known as Division I-AA from 1978 through 2005. There are 128 FCS programs as of the 2026 season. Conference affiliations are current for the 2026 season. The teams in this subdivision compete in a 24-team playoff for the NCAA Division I Football Championship. All leagues allow scholarships with the exception of the Ivy League and Pioneer Football League.

== FCS programs ==
Team	Name	School	City	State (Note: 12 states (Alaska, Hawaii, Kansas, Michigan, Nebraska, Nevada, New Mexico, Oklahoma, Vermont, West Virginia, Wisconsin, and Wyoming) do not currently have FCS programs.)	Program established	First FCS season	Conference (Note: According to conferences in football, not necessarily a team's primary conference.)
Abilene Christian	Wildcats	Abilene Christian University	Abilene	Texas	1919	2013	UAC
Alabama A&M	Bulldogs	Alabama A&M University	Normal (Note: The campus mailing address is Huntsville; Normal is a Huntsville neighborhood that encompasses the AAMU campus.)	Alabama	1912	1999	SWAC
Alabama State	Hornets	Alabama State University	Montgomery	Alabama	1901	1982	SWAC
Albany	Great Danes	State University of New York at Albany	Albany	New York	1922 (Note: The first fielded team only played three seasons (1922–1924), from 1925 through 1969 Albany did not have a football program. The modern era of Albany football began in 1970, when the school restored football as a club sport. The team was upgraded to full varsity status in 1973.)	1999	CAA Football
Alcorn State	Braves	Alcorn State University	Lorman (Note: The Alcorn State campus has a Lorman mailing address, but is in unincorporated Claiborne County and is designated by the US Census Bureau as Alcorn State, Mississippi.)	Mississippi	1921	1978	SWAC
Arkansas–Pine Bluff	Golden Lions	University of Arkansas at Pine Bluff	Pine Bluff	Arkansas	1916	1998	SWAC
Austin Peay	Governors	Austin Peay State University	Clarksville	Tennessee	1930	1978	UAC
Bethune–Cookman	Wildcats	Bethune–Cookman University	Daytona Beach	Florida	1925	1980	SWAC
Brown	Bears	Brown University	Providence	Rhode Island	1878	1982	Ivy
Bryant	Bulldogs	Bryant University	Smithfield	Rhode Island	1999	2012	CAA Football
Bucknell	Bison	Bucknell University	Lewisburg	Pennsylvania	1883	1978	Patriot
Butler	Bulldogs	Butler University	Indianapolis	Indiana	1887	1993	PFL
Cal Poly	Mustangs	California Polytechnic State University	San Luis Obispo	California	1915	1994	Big Sky
Campbell	Fighting Camels	Campbell University	Buies Creek	North Carolina	1925; 2008	2008	CAA Football
Central Arkansas	Bears	University of Central Arkansas	Conway	Arkansas	1908	2010	UAC
Central Connecticut	Blue Devils	Central Connecticut State University	New Britain	Connecticut	1935	1993	NEC
Charleston Southern	Buccaneers	Charleston Southern University	North Charleston	South Carolina	1985	1993	OVC
Chattanooga	Mocs	University of Tennessee at Chattanooga	Chattanooga	Tennessee	1899	1982	SoCon
Chicago State	Cougars	Chicago State University	Chicago	Illinois	2026	2026	Independent (Note: Chicago State will join NEC in 2027.)
The Citadel	Bulldogs	The Citadel, The Military College of South Carolina	Charleston	South Carolina	1905	1982	SoCon
Colgate	Raiders	Colgate University	Hamilton	New York	1890	1982	Patriot
Columbia	Lions	Columbia University	New York	New York	1870	1982	Ivy
Cornell	Big Red	Cornell University	Ithaca	New York	1887	1982	Ivy
Dartmouth	Big Green	Dartmouth College	Hanover	New Hampshire	1881	1982	Ivy
Davidson	Wildcats	Davidson College	Davidson	North Carolina	1896	1978; 1993	PFL
Dayton	Flyers	University of Dayton	Dayton	Ohio	1903	1993	PFL
Delaware State	Hornets	Delaware State University	Dover	Delaware	1924	1978; 1980	MEAC
Drake	Bulldogs	Drake University	Des Moines	Iowa	1893	1982; 1993	PFL
Duquesne	Dukes	Duquesne University	Pittsburgh	Pennsylvania	1891	1993	NEC
East Tennessee State	Buccaneers	East Tennessee State University	Johnson City	Tennessee	1920; 2015	1982; 2015	SoCon
East Texas A&M	Lions	East Texas A&M University	Commerce	Texas	1915	2022	Southland
Eastern Illinois	Panthers	Eastern Illinois University	Charleston	Illinois	1899	1981	OVC
Eastern Kentucky	Colonels	Eastern Kentucky University	Richmond	Kentucky	1891	1978	UAC
Eastern Washington	Eagles	Eastern Washington University	Cheney	Washington	1901	1984	Big Sky
Elon	Phoenix	Elon University	Elon	North Carolina	1909	1999	CAA Football
Florida A&M	Rattlers	Florida A&M University	Tallahassee	Florida	1907	1979	SWAC
Fordham	Rams	Fordham University	New York	New York	1881	1989	Patriot
Furman	Paladins	Furman University	Greenville	South Carolina	1889	1982	SoCon
Gardner–Webb	Runnin' Bulldogs	Gardner–Webb University	Boiling Springs	North Carolina	1946	2002	OVC
Georgetown	Hoyas	Georgetown University	Washington	District of Columbia	1881	1993	Patriot
Grambling State	Tigers	Grambling State University	Grambling	Louisiana	1927	1978	SWAC
Hampton	Pirates	Hampton University	Hampton	Virginia	1902	1997	CAA Football
Harvard	Crimson	Harvard University	Cambridge (Note: Although the academic core of the Harvard campus, including the university administration, is located in Cambridge, the school's athletic complex, including the football stadium, is within the city limits of Boston.)	Massachusetts	1873	1982	Ivy
Holy Cross	Crusaders	College of the Holy Cross	Worcester	Massachusetts	1891	1982	Patriot
Houston Christian	Huskies	Houston Christian University	Houston	Texas	2013	2014	Southland
Howard	Bison	Howard University	Washington	District of Columbia	1882	1978; 1980	MEAC
Idaho	Vandals	University of Idaho	Moscow	Idaho	1893	1978; 2018	Big Sky (Note: This is Idaho's second stint in the grouping now known as FCS; it had been a member of what was then known as Division I-AA from the group's creation in 1978 through 1995, after which it moved to the league then known as the Pacific Coast Athletic Association (now the Big West Conference). At that time, the PCAA sponsored FBS (then Division I-A) football.)
Idaho State	Bengals	Idaho State University	Pocatello	Idaho	1902	1978	Big Sky
Illinois State	Redbirds	Illinois State University	Normal	Illinois	1887	1982	MVFC
Incarnate Word	Cardinals	University of the Incarnate Word	San Antonio	Texas	2009	2013	Southland
Indiana State	Sycamores	Indiana State University	Terre Haute	Indiana	1895	1982	MVFC
Jackson State	Tigers	Jackson State University	Jackson	Mississippi	1911	1978	SWAC
Lafayette	Leopards	Lafayette College	Easton	Pennsylvania	1882	1978	Patriot
Lamar	Cardinals	Lamar University	Beaumont	Texas	1923; 2009	1982; 2010	Southland
Lehigh	Mountain Hawks	Lehigh University	Bethlehem	Pennsylvania	1884	1978	Patriot
Lindenwood	Lions	Lindenwood University	St. Charles	Missouri	1990	2022	OVC
LIU (Note: Effective in 2019-20, Long Island University merged its two athletic programs the Division I non-football LIU Brooklyn Blackbirds and Division II football-sponsoring LIU Post Pioneers into a single D-I athletic program under the Sharks name. The LIU Post football team became the new LIU football team, playing at its current home on the Post campus and joining the Northeast Conference. LIU was immediately eligible for the playoffs, as it was treated as a new football program of an existing D-I institution, but lost all its Division I games in the 2019 season and failed to qualify.)	Sharks	Long Island University	Brookville	New York	1957 (Note: First season of the LIU Post program that became the LIU program in 2019. The Brooklyn campus first played football in 1928, but dropped the sport in 1940, before the Post campus existed; LIU traces the history of its current football program through Post.)	2019	NEC
Maine	Black Bears	University of Maine	Orono	Maine	1892	1978	CAA Football
Marist	Red Foxes	Marist University	Poughkeepsie	New York	1965	1993	PFL
McNeese	Cowboys	McNeese State University	Lake Charles	Louisiana	1950	1982	Southland
Mercer	Bears	Mercer University	Macon	Georgia	1891; 2013	2013	SoCon
Merrimack	Warriors	Merrimack College	North Andover	Massachusetts	1947	2019	Independent
Mississippi Valley State	Delta Devils	Mississippi Valley State University	Itta Bena (Note: The MVSU campus has an Itta Bena mailing address, but is in unincorporated Leflore County and is designated by the US Census Bureau as Mississippi Valley State, Mississippi.)	Mississippi	1953	1980	SWAC
Monmouth	Hawks	Monmouth University	West Long Branch	New Jersey	1993	1994	CAA Football
Montana	Grizzlies	University of Montana	Missoula	Montana	1897	1978	Big Sky
Montana State	Bobcats	Montana State University	Bozeman	Montana	1897	1978	Big Sky
Morehead State	Eagles	Morehead State University	Morehead	Kentucky	1924	1978	PFL
Morgan State	Bears	Morgan State University	Baltimore	Maryland	1897	1986	MEAC
Murray State	Racers	Murray State University	Murray	Kentucky	1924	1978	MVFC
New Hampshire	Wildcats	University of New Hampshire	Durham	New Hampshire	1893	1978	CAA Football
Nicholls	Colonels	Nicholls State University	Thibodaux	Louisiana	1972	1980	Southland
Norfolk State	Spartans	Norfolk State University	Norfolk	Virginia	1938	1997	MEAC
North Alabama	Lions	University of North Alabama	Florence	Alabama	1912	2018	UAC
North Carolina A&T	Aggies	North Carolina A&T State University	Greensboro	North Carolina	1901	1978; 1980	CAA Football
North Carolina Central	Eagles	North Carolina Central University	Durham	North Carolina	1921	2011	MEAC
North Dakota	Fighting Hawks	University of North Dakota	Grand Forks	North Dakota	1894	2012	MVFC
Northern Arizona	Lumberjacks	Northern Arizona University	Flagstaff	Arizona	1915	1978	Big Sky
Northern Colorado	Bears	University of Northern Colorado	Greeley	Colorado	1892	2007	Big Sky
Northern Iowa	Panthers	University of Northern Iowa	Cedar Falls	Iowa	1895	1981	MVFC
Northwestern State	Demons	Northwestern State University	Natchitoches	Louisiana	1907	1978	Southland
Penn	Quakers	University of Pennsylvania	Philadelphia	Pennsylvania	1876	1982	Ivy
Portland State	Vikings	Portland State University	Portland (Note: Portland State's campus is in the city of Portland, but it plays its home football games in the suburb of Hillsboro.)	Oregon	1947	1978; 1998	Big Sky
Prairie View A&M	Panthers	Prairie View A&M University	Prairie View	Texas	1906	1978	SWAC
Presbyterian	Blue Hose	Presbyterian College	Clinton	South Carolina	1913	2011	PFL
Princeton	Tigers	Princeton University	Princeton	New Jersey	1869	1982	Ivy
Rhode Island	Rams	University of Rhode Island	Kingston	Rhode Island	1895	1978	CAA Football
Richmond	Spiders	University of Richmond	Richmond	Virginia	1881	1982	Patriot
Robert Morris	Colonials	Robert Morris University	Moon Township	Pennsylvania	1994	1998	NEC
Sacred Heart	Pioneers	Sacred Heart University	Fairfield	Connecticut	1991	1999	CAA Football
St. Thomas	Tommies	University of St. Thomas	Saint Paul	Minnesota	1904	2021	PFL
Samford	Bulldogs	Samford University	Birmingham	Alabama	1902	1989	SoCon
San Diego	Toreros	University of San Diego	San Diego	California	1956	1993	PFL
South Carolina State	Bulldogs	South Carolina State University	Orangeburg	South Carolina	1906	1978; 1980	MEAC
South Dakota	Coyotes	University of South Dakota	Vermillion	South Dakota	1889	2012	MVFC
South Dakota State	Jackrabbits	South Dakota State University	Brookings	South Dakota	1889	2008	MVFC
Southeast Missouri State	Redhawks	Southeast Missouri State University	Cape Girardeau	Missouri	1902	1990	OVC
Southeastern Louisiana	Lions	Southeastern Louisiana University	Hammond	Louisiana	1930; 2003	1980; 2003	Southland
Southern	Jaguars	Southern University	Baton Rouge	Louisiana	1915	1978	SWAC
Southern Illinois	Salukis	Southern Illinois University Carbondale	Carbondale	Illinois	1904	1982	MVFC
Southern Utah	Thunderbirds	Southern Utah University	Cedar City	Utah	1929	1993	Big Sky
Stephen F. Austin	Lumberjacks	Stephen F. Austin State University	Nacogdoches	Texas	1923	1986	Southland
Stetson	Hatters	Stetson University	DeLand	Florida	1901; 2013	2013	PFL
Stonehill	Skyhawks	Stonehill College	Easton	Massachusetts	1970	2022	NEC
Stony Brook	Seawolves	Stony Brook University	Stony Brook	New York	1969	1999	CAA Football
Tarleton State (Note: Also known simply as Tarleton.)	Texans	Tarleton State University	Stephenville	Texas	1899	2024	UAC
Tennessee State	Tigers	Tennessee State University	Nashville	Tennessee	1916	1981	OVC
Tennessee Tech	Golden Eagles	Tennessee Technological University	Cookeville	Tennessee	1917	1978	SoCon
Texas Southern	Tigers	Texas Southern University	Houston	Texas	1947	1978	SWAC
Towson	Tigers	Towson University	Towson	Maryland	1968	1987	CAA Football
UC Davis	Aggies	University of California, Davis	Davis	California	1915	2007	Big Sky
UT Martin	Skyhawks	University of Tennessee at Martin	Martin	Tennessee	1953	1992	OVC
Utah Tech	Trailblazers	Utah Tech University	St. George	Utah	1911	2020	Big Sky
UTRGV	Vaqueros	University of Texas Rio Grande Valley	Brownsville & Edinburg (Note: While UTRGV has multiple campuses within its service area, its athletic program is based at the Edinburg campus, which it inherited from its athletic predecessor, the University of Texas–Pan American. The football team plans to play home games in both Brownsville (home to a UTRGV campus inherited from the University of Texas at Brownsville) and Edinburg; when UTRGV confirmed the addition of football in late 2022, it committed to establishing separate marching bands and spirit programs for the two campuses.)	Texas	2025 (Note: The former UTPA played football while it was a junior college, but never had a football program as a four-year institution.)	2025	Southland
Valparaiso	Beacons	Valparaiso University	Valparaiso	Indiana	1906	1993	PFL
Villanova	Wildcats	Villanova University	Villanova	Pennsylvania	1894	1987	Patriot
VMI	Keydets	Virginia Military Institute	Lexington	Virginia	1873	1982	SoCon
Wagner	Seahawks	Wagner College	New York	New York	1927	1993	NEC
Weber State	Wildcats	Weber State University	Ogden	Utah	1962	1978	Big Sky
Western Carolina	Catamounts	Western Carolina University	Cullowhee	North Carolina	1931	1982	SoCon
Western Illinois	Leathernecks	Western Illinois University	Macomb	Illinois	1903	1981	OVC
William & Mary	Tribe	College of William & Mary	Williamsburg	Virginia	1893	1982	Patriot
Wofford	Terriers	Wofford College	Spartanburg	South Carolina	1889	1995	SoCon
Yale	Bulldogs	Yale University	New Haven	Connecticut	1872	1982	Ivy
Youngstown State	Penguins	Youngstown State University	Youngstown	Ohio	1938	1981	MVFC

== Transitioning from Division II ==
The following programs are transitioning from NCAA Division II to FCS, or have announced definitive plans to do so. Under current NCAA rules, they must have an invitation from a Division I conference to begin the transition. During the normally four-year transition period, they are ineligible for the FCS playoffs. Since January 2025, the NCAA has expedited the reclassification period for schools, by one year, with schools already reclassifying to Division I being given the option to use either the new, shorter reclassification period or the original, longer period they initially agreed to. The new transition period is three years instead of the previous four for schools transitioning from Division II.

Team	School	City	State	Founded	First played	Conference	FCS transition begins	Full membership
Mercyhurst Lakers (Note: Mercyhurst started a transition from Division II to Division I in 2024, joining the Northeast Conference.)	Mercyhurst University	Erie	Pennsylvania	1926	1981	NEC	2024	2027
New Haven Chargers (Note: New Haven started a transition from Division II to Division I in July 2025, joining the Northeast Conference as a full member, including football.)	University of New Haven	West Haven	Connecticut	1920	1973	NEC	2025	2028
West Florida Argonauts (Note: West Florida started a transition from Division II to Division I in July 2026 as a new member of the Atlantic Sun Conference (ASUN). Their football team plays as a football-only member in the United Athletic Conference (UAC).)	University of West Florida	Pensacola	Florida	1963	2016	UAC	2026	2029
West Georgia Wolves (Note: West Georgia started a transition from Division II to Division I in 2024 as a new member of the Atlantic Sun Conference (ASUN). The football team plays in the United Athletic Conference, which was a single-sport alliance between the ASUN and the Western Athletic Conference through the 2025 season. The UAC became an all-sports conference in July 2026 as a rebranded WAC, with West Georgia as a member.)	University of West Georgia	Carrollton	Georgia	1906	1981	UAC	2024	2027

== Former Division I FCS football programs ==
School	Nickname	City	State	First Division I FCS season	Last Division I FCS season	Former FCS conference	Current level
University of Akron	Zips	Akron	Ohio	1979	1986	Ohio Valley Conference	Division I FBS
Appalachian State University	Mountaineers	Boone	North Carolina	1982	2013	Southern Conference	Division I FBS
University of Alabama at Birmingham	Blazers	Birmingham	Alabama	1993	1995	I-AA independent	Division I FBS
Arkansas State University	Indians (Note: Nickname changed to Red Wolves in 2008.)	Jonesboro	Arkansas	1982	1991	I-AA independent	Division I FBS
Ball State University	Cardinals	Muncie	Indiana	1982	1983 (Note: 8 of the 10 schools in the MAC at the time were reclassified from Division I-A to Division I-AA prior to the 1982 season. However, following appeals from Bowling Green, Miami (OH), Northern Illinois, and Western Michigan, the conference as a whole was permitted to remain in I-A beginning in the 1983 season.)	Mid-American Conference	Division I FBS
Boise State University	Broncos	Boise	Idaho	1978	1995	Big Sky Conference	Division I FBS
Boston University	Terriers	Boston	Massachusetts	1978	1997	Atlantic 10 Conference	Program dropped
Bowling Green State University	Falcons	Bowling Green	Ohio	1982	1983	Mid-American Conference	Division I FBS
University at Buffalo	Bulls	Buffalo	New York	1993	1998	I-AA independent	Division I FBS
California State University, Northridge	Matadors	Northridge	California	1993	2001	I-AA independent	Program dropped
Canisius University	Golden Griffins	Buffalo	New York	1993	2002	Metro Atlantic Athletic Conference	Program dropped
University of Central Florida	Golden Knights (Note: Nickname changed to Knights in 2007.)	Orlando (Note: UCF's campus has an Orlando mailing address, but is located entirely within unincorporated Orange County.)	Florida	1990	1995	I-AA independent	Division I FBS
University of Cincinnati	Bearcats	Cincinnati	Ohio	1982	1982 (Note: Cincinnati was initially reclassified from Division I-A to Division I-AA prior to the 1982 season. However, the university filed an injunction to postpone their demotion to after the 1982 season, and was ultimately successful in remaining in I-A.)	I-AA independent	Division I FBS
Coastal Carolina University	Chanticleers	Conway	South Carolina	2003	2016	I-AA independent	Division I FBS
University of Connecticut	Huskies	Storrs (Note: UConn currently plays its home games in East Hartford, Connecticut.)	Connecticut	1978	1999	Atlantic 10 Conference	Division I FBS
University of Delaware	Fightin' Blue Hens	Newark	Delaware	1980	2024	CAA Football	Division I FBS
Eastern Michigan University	Hurons (Note: Nickname changed to Eagles in 1991.)	Ypsilanti	Michigan	1982	1983	Mid-American Conference	Division I FBS
University of Evansville	Purple Aces	Evansville	Indiana	1993	1997	Pioneer Football League	Program dropped
Fairfield University	Stags	Fairfield	Connecticut	1997	2002	Metro Atlantic Athletic Conference	Program dropped
Florida Atlantic University	Owls	Boca Raton	Florida	2001	2004	I-AA independent	Division I FBS
Florida International University	Panthers	Miami (Note: FIU's campus has a Miami mailing address, but is located entirely within unincorporated Miami-Dade County.)	Florida	2003	2004	I-AA independent	Division I FBS
Georgia Southern University	Eagles	Statesboro	Georgia	1984	2013	Southern Conference	Division I FBS
Georgia State University	Panthers	Atlanta	Georgia	2010	2012	CAA Football	Division I FBS
Hofstra University	Pride	Hempstead	New York	1993	2009	CAA Football	Program dropped
Iona University	Gaels	New Rochelle	New York	1993	2008	FCS independent	Program dropped
Jacksonville University	Dolphins	Jacksonville	Florida	1998	2019	Pioneer Football League	Program dropped
Jacksonville State University	Gamecocks	Jacksonville	Alabama	1997	2022	ASUN Conference	Division I FBS
James Madison University	Dukes	Harrisonburg	Virginia	1980	2021	CAA Football	Division I FBS
Kennesaw State University	Owls	Kennesaw (Note: Kennesaw State's campus has a Kennesaw mailing address, but is located entirely within unincorporated Cobb County.)	Georgia	2015	2023	FCS independent	Division I FBS
Kent State University	Golden Flashes	Kent	Ohio	1982	1983	Mid-American Conference	Division I FBS
La Salle University	Explorers	Philadelphia	Pennsylvania	1997	2007	Metro Atlantic Athletic Conference	Program dropped
Liberty University	Flames	Lynchburg	Virginia	1989	2017	Big South Conference	Division I FBS
Louisiana Tech University	Bulldogs	Ruston	Louisiana	1982	1988	I-AA independent	Division I FBS
Marshall University	Thundering Herd	Huntington	West Virginia	1982	1996	Southern Conference	Division I FBS
University of Massachusetts Amherst	Minutemen	Amherst	Massachusetts	1978	2011	CAA Football	Division I FBS
Miami University	Redskins (Note: Nickname changed to RedHawks in 1996.)	Oxford	Ohio	1982	1983	Mid-American Conference	Division I FBS
Middle Tennessee State University	Blue Raiders	Murfreesboro	Tennessee	1978	1998	Ohio Valley Conference	Division I FBS
Missouri State University	Bears	Springfield	Missouri	1982	2024	MVFC	Division I FBS
Morris Brown College	Wolverines	Atlanta	Georgia	2001	2003	I-AA independent	Dropped athletics
University of Nevada, Reno	Wolf Pack	Reno	Nevada	1978	1991	Big Sky Conference	Division I FBS
University of North Carolina at Charlotte	49ers	Charlotte	North Carolina	2013	2014	FCS independent	Division I FBS
North Dakota State University	Bison	Fargo	North Dakota	2004	2025	MVFC	Division I FBS
University of North Texas	Mean Green	Denton	Texas	1982	1994	Southland Conference	Division I FBS
Northeast Louisiana University (Note: University of Louisiana at Monroe (ULM) since 1999.)	Indians (Note: Nickname changed to Warhawks in 2006.)	Monroe	Louisiana	1982	1993	Southland Conference	Division I FBS
Northeastern University	Huskies	Boston	Massachusetts	1978	2009	CAA Football	Program dropped
Northern Illinois University	Huskies	DeKalb	Illinois	1982	1983	Mid-American Conference	Division I FBS
Ohio University	Bobcats	Athens	Ohio	1982	1983	Mid-American Conference	Division I FBS
Old Dominion University	Monarchs	Norfolk	Virginia	2009	2013	FCS independent	Division I FBS
California State University, Sacramento	Hornets	Sacramento	California	1993	2025	Big Sky Conference	Division I FBS
Saint Francis University	Red Flash (Note: Nickname changed to Red Wolves in 2026.)	Loretto	Pennsylvania	1993	2025	NEC	Division III
St. John's University	Red Storm	Queens	New York	1993	2002	Metro Atlantic Athletic Conference	Program dropped
Saint Mary's College of California	Gaels	Moraga	California	1993	2003	I-AA independent	Program dropped
Saint Peter's University	Peacocks	Jersey City	New Jersey	1993	2006	Metro Atlantic Athletic Conference	Program dropped
Sam Houston State University	Bearkats	Huntsville	Texas	1986	2022	Western Athletic Conference	Division I FBS
Savannah State University	Tigers	Savannah	Georgia	2002	2018	Mid-Eastern Athletic Conference	Division II
Siena College (Note: Siena University since 2025.)	Saints	Loudonville	New York	1993	2003	Metro Atlantic Athletic Conference	Program dropped
University of South Alabama	Jaguars	Mobile	Alabama	2010	2011	FCS independent	Division I FBS
University of South Florida	Bulls	Tampa	Florida	1997	2000	I-AA independent	Division I FBS
Southwest Texas State University (Note: Texas State University since 2013.)	Bobcats	San Marcos	Texas	1984	2010	FCS independent	Division I FBS
University of Texas at Arlington	Mavericks	Arlington	Texas	1982	1985	Southland Conference	Program dropped
University of Texas at San Antonio (UTSA)	Roadrunners	San Antonio	Texas	2011	2011	FCS independent	Division I FBS
Troy State University (Note: Troy University since 2004.)	Trojans	Troy	Alabama	1978	2000	Southland Conference	Division I FBS
West Texas State University (Note: West Texas A&M University since 1993.)	Buffaloes	Canyon	Texas	1982	1985	Missouri Valley Conference	Division II
Western Kentucky University	Hilltoppers	Bowling Green	Kentucky	1978	2008	FCS independent	Division I FBS
Western Michigan University	Broncos	Kalamazoo	Michigan	1982	1983	Mid-American Conference	Division I FBS

== See also ==
- List of NCAA Division I FCS football stadiums
- List of NCAA Division I FCS playoff appearances by team
- List of NCAA Division I non-football programs
- List of NCAA Division I institutions
- List of NCAA Division II institutions
- List of NCAA Division III institutions
- List of NCAA Division I FBS football programs
- List of NCAA Division II football programs
- List of NCAA Division III football programs
- List of NAIA football programs
- List of community college football programs
- List of colleges and universities with club football teams
- List of defunct college football teams
