= NCAA Division I Football Championship Subdivision =

Level of college football in the US

NCAA Division I Football Championship Subdivision (FCS)
- Current season, competition or edition: 2026 NCAA Division I FCS football season
- Sport: American football
- Founded: 1978
- First season: 1978; 48 years ago
- Organizing body: NCAA
- Division: 1
- No. of teams: 128
- Country: United States
- Most recent champion: Montana State (2025)
- Most titles: North Dakota State (10 titles)
- Website: ncaa.com/football/fcs

The NCAA Division I Football Championship Subdivision (FCS), formerly known as Division I-AA, is the second-highest level of college football in the United States, after the Football Bowl Subdivision (FBS). Sponsored by the National Collegiate Athletic Association (NCAA), the FCS level comprises 128 teams in 13 conferences as of the 2026 season.

== History ==
From 1906 to 1955, the NCAA had no divisional structure for member schools. Prior to the 1956 college football season, NCAA schools were organized into an upper University Division and lower College Division. In the summer of 1973, the University Division became Division I, but by 1976, there was a desire to further separate the major football programs from those that were less financially successful, while allowing their other sports to compete at the top level.

Division I-AA was created in January 1978, when Division I was subdivided into Division I-A and Division I-AA for football only. The initial criteria for a program's admittance to I-A included (1) scheduling 60% of its games against other I-A teams, and either (2) having a 30,000-seat stadium and an average attendance of 17,000 for one year in the last four, or (3) drawing an average of 17,000 over the last four years. Division I football schools satisfying #1 and either #2 or #3 also had to maintain eight sports overall. Schools failing to meet either #2 or #3 could still qualify for I-A if they maintained twelve sports overall. (NOTE: the NCAA, at the time, governed male sports only; women's teams did not count toward these totals). Of 144 schools participating in Division I football in the 1977 season, 79 were expected to qualify for I-A, with the remaining 65 relegated to I-AA.

But because the NCAA allowed four years for criteria #2 and #3 to be met, just eight schools (seven from the Southwestern Athletic Conference, a league of HBCUs that had just moved to Division I in 1977) opted for Division I-AA for the 1978 season. Meanwhile, another 35 reclassified from Division II to Division I-AA, including four entire conferences. Thus, at least initially, the creation of Division I-AA appeared to backfire; rather than serve as a home for the smaller or less competitive football programs of Division I, it created a pathway for football-playing Division II schools to join Division I without the burden of funding a major football program. Division I-AA still had just 50 members when the four-year deadline set in January 1978 expired, forcing 41 schools that did not meet I-A criteria to reclassify to I-AA. Some successfully appealed the decision, including eight members of the Mid-American Conference along with Cincinnati, a football independent at the time. Thus I-AA membership hit an early peak of 91 in 1982, before settling down into the 80–90 range for the next several years.

The next big increase in Division I-AA membership came after the January 1991 NCAA convention voted to require every athletic program to maintain all of its sports at the same divisional level by the 1993 season. In order to comply, 28 Division I schools with football programs at the Division II and Division III levels were forced to upgrade their teams to the Division I level, and all of them (at least initially) chose Division I-AA as their new football home. At the same time, the number of football scholarships allowed in I-AA was reduced from the original 70 to 63, effective in 1994; it has remained at that number ever since. With the new additions, membership in I-AA hit a new high of 118 in 1993.

The subdivision stabilized thereafter, maintaining at least 120 members from 1997 onward. Membership peaked at 130 in 2022 before settling at the current 128.

NCAA Division I-A and NCAA Division I-AA were renamed as NCAA Division I FBS and NCAA Division I FCS prior to the 2006 season.

== Playoff Format ==
The FCS has held a post-season playoff to award an NCAA-sanctioned national championship since its inception in 1978, starting with a 4-team playoff.

The field first expanded to 8 in 1981. This grew to 12 teams the following season. It expanded to 16 in 1986 until 2010 when it grew to 20 teams. As of 2013, the playoff format consists of 24 teams.

The Ivy League began participating in the FCS playoffs in 2025, making their conference champion one of the 11 automatic bids. The rest of the field consists of 13 at-large bids, determined by a playoff committee.

Until 2024, only the Top 8 teams were seeded. This created a scenario where the first round host sites were determined via a bid submitted by each school participating in the playoff. Currently, seeds 9-16 host the remaining unseeded schools based on proximity in the first round. The second round is hosted by the 1-8 seeds. The higher-seeded school hosts the quarterfinals and semifinals.

The championship game is currently played in Nashville, Tennessee at FirstBank Stadium.

== Conferences ==
As of the 2026 football season, there are 13 Division I FCS football conferences:

- Big Sky Conference
- CAA Football – While administered by the multi-sports Coastal Athletic Association, it is a separate legal entity – although the NCAA considers both sides of the CAA to be a single conference.
- Ivy League
- Mid-Eastern Athletic Conference
- Missouri Valley Football Conference
- NEC (historically the Northeast Conference)
- Ohio Valley Conference
  - Replaced the OVC–Big South Football Association, an alliance between the OVC and Big South Conference that shared a single automatic FCS playoff berth from 2023–2025. The two all-sports conferences agreed that from 2026 on, football would be organized solely by the OVC. The two Big South members that had participated in the alliance became OVC football members.
- Patriot League
- Pioneer Football League
- Southern Conference
- Southland Conference
- Southwestern Athletic Conference
- United Athletic Conference
  - The name had been used from 2023–2025 by a football-only league created as an alliance between the Atlantic Sun Conference (then ASUN Conference) and Western Athletic Conference. In the 2021 and 2022 seasons, those two all-sports conferences had been partners in a football alliance that shared a single berth in the FCS playoffs. Before 2026, the NCAA technically considered the UAC to be a continuation of this alliance instead of a fully formed conference. In July 2026, the WAC rebranded as the UAC, absorbing the football-only UAC.

== See also ==
- List of NCAA Division I FCS football programs
- List of NCAA Division I FCS football stadiums
- List of NCAA Division I FCS playoff appearances by team
- List of NCAA Division I-AA/FCS football seasons
- NCAA Division I FBS
