= List of NCAA Division III football programs =

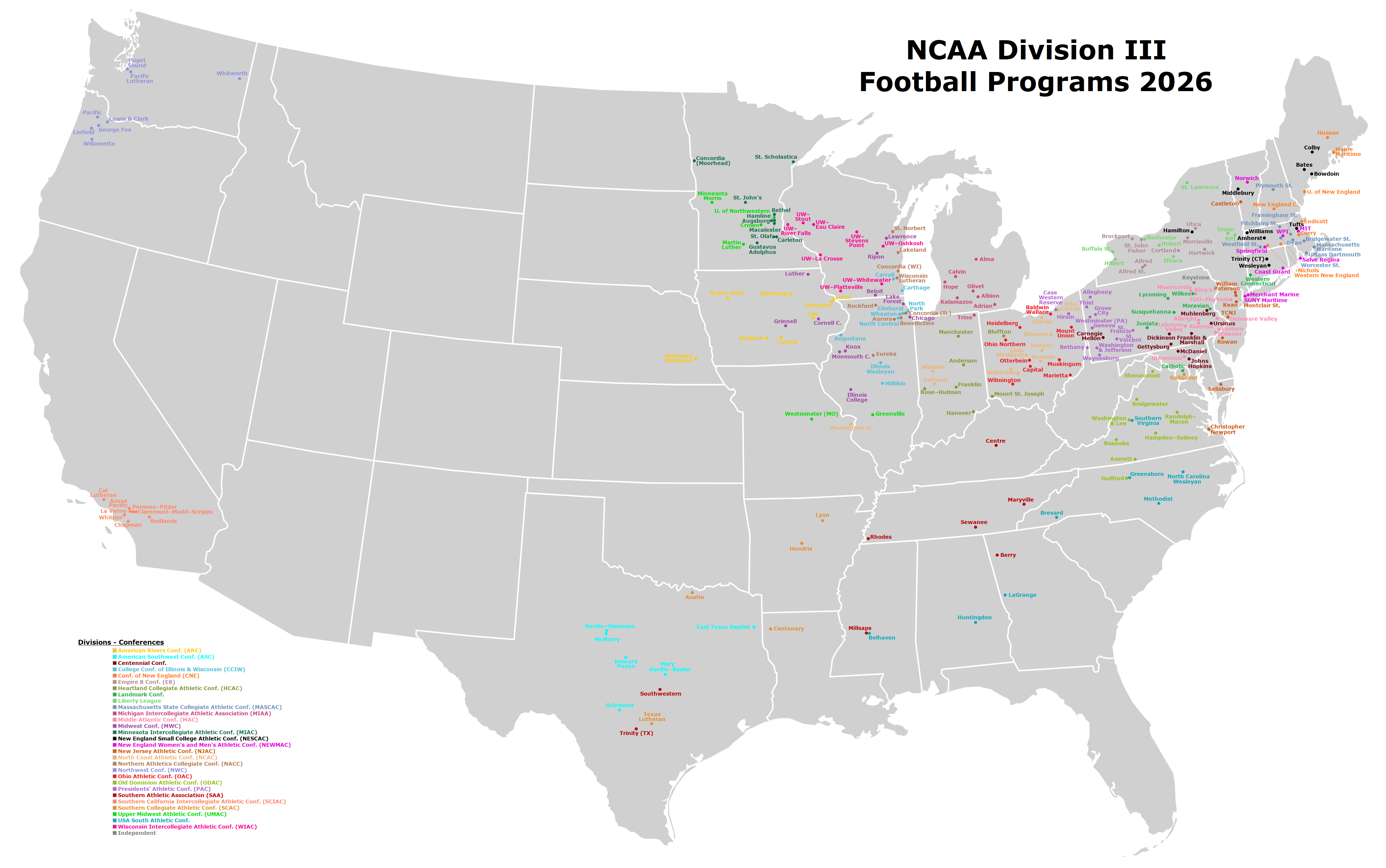
Map of NCAA Division III football programs, 2026

There are 244 NCAA Division III football programs in the United States. Teams and conference affiliations are current for the 2026 season.

== NCAA Division III football programs ==
Legend
*	Former NCAA Division I (or equivalent) national champions
^	Former NCAA Division I (or equivalent) member

Team	Nickname	City	State (Note: 17 states (Alaska, Arizona, Colorado, Delaware, Florida, Hawaii, Idaho, Kansas, Montana, Nevada, New Mexico, North Dakota, Oklahoma, South Carolina, South Dakota, Utah, and Wyoming) do not currently have Division III football programs.)	Enrollment	Current conference (Note: According to conferences in football, not necessarily a team's primary conference.)	First played	Joined Division III
Adrian	Bulldogs	Adrian	Michigan	1,654	MIAA	1892	1973
Albion	Britons	Albion	Michigan	1,500	MIAA	1984	1973
Albright	Lions	Reading	Pennsylvania	2,320	MAC	1912	1973
Alfred	Saxons	Alfred	New York	2,300	Empire 8	1895	1973
Alfred State	Pioneers	Alfred	New York	3,737	Empire 8	2003	2013
Allegheny	Gators	Meadville	Pennsylvania	1,771	PAC	1893	1973
Alma	Scots	Alma	Michigan	1,378	MIAA	1894	1973
Alvernia	Golden Wolves	Reading	Pennsylvania	2,900	MAC	2018	2018
Amherst^	Mammoths	Amherst	Massachusetts	1,855	NESCAC	1877	1973
Anderson (IN)	Ravens	Anderson	Indiana	1,566	HCAC	1947	1992
Augsburg	Auggies	Minneapolis	Minnesota	3,822	MIAC	1926	1982
Augustana (IL)	Vikings	Rock Island	Illinois	3,822	CCIW	1920	1973
Aurora	Spartans	Aurora	Illinois	3,800	NACC	1899	1988
Austin	Kangaroos	Sherman	Texas	1,223	SCAC	1896	1997 (Note: Austin was previously a Division III member between 1973 and 1977.)
Averett	Cougars	Danville	Virginia	1,870	ODAC	2000	2000
Azusa Pacific	Cougars	Azusa	California	7,120	SCIAC	1965	2026
Baldwin Wallace^	Yellow Jackets	Berea	Ohio	2,912	OAC	1893	1973
Bates	Bobcats	Lewiston	Maine	1,780	NESCAC	1875	1973
Belhaven	Blazers	Jackson	Mississippi	4,245	USA South	1998	2015
Beloit	Buccaneers	Beloit	Wisconsin	1,402	MWC	1889	1973
Benedictine	Eagles	Lisle	Illinois	4,885	NACC	1917	1973
Berry	Vikings	Mount Berry	Georgia	2,110	SAA	2013	2013
Bethany	Bison	Bethany	West Virginia	650	PAC	1894	1973
Bethel	Royals	Arden Hills	Minnesota	2,533	MIAC	1947	1983
Bluffton	Beavers	Bluffton	Ohio	1,094	HCAC	1913	1992 (Note: Bluffton was previously a Division III member in 1990.)
Bowdoin	Polar Bears	Brunswick	Maine	1,805	NESCAC	1889	1973
Brevard	Tornados	Brevard	North Carolina	703	USA South	1924	2017
Bridgewater	Eagles	Bridgewater	Virginia	1,800	ODAC	1899	1973
Bridgewater State	Bears	Bridgewater	Massachusetts	10,651	MASCAC	1960	1973
Brockport	Golden Eagles	Brockport	New York	8,287	Empire 8	1947	1973
Buena Vista	Beavers	Storm Lake	Iowa	2,775	ARC	1896	1973
Buffalo State	Bengals	Buffalo	New York	9,118	Liberty	1981	1981
Cal Lutheran	Kingsmen	Thousand Oaks	California	3,888	SCIAC	1962	1991 (Note: Cal Lutheran was previously a Division III member between 1975 and 1977.)
Calvin	Knights	Grand Rapids	Michigan	3,256	MIAA	2024	2024
Capital	Comets	Columbus	Ohio	3,367	OAC	1923	1973
Carleton	Knights	Northfield	Minnesota	2,105	MIAC	1883	1973
Carnegie Mellon^	Tartans	Pittsburgh	Pennsylvania	14,799	Centennial	1906	1973
Carroll (WI)	Pioneers	Waukesha	Wisconsin	3,358	CCIW	1894	1976
Carthage	Firebirds	Kenosha	Wisconsin	2,800	CCIW	1895	1976
Case Western Reserve^	Spartans	Cleveland	Ohio	12,266	PAC	1890	1973
Catholic University^	Cardinals	Washington	District of Columbia	5,956	Landmark	1895	1978
Centenary	Gentlemen	Shreveport	Louisiana	563	SCAC	1909	2024
Central (IA)	Dutch	Pella	Iowa	1,100	ARC	1892	1973
Centre*	Colonels	Danville	Kentucky	1,430	SAA	1880	1973
Chapman	Panthers	Orange	California	8,542	SCIAC	1923	1994
Chicago*	Maroons	Chicago	Illinois	16,445	MWC	1892	1973
Christopher Newport	Captains	Newport News	Virginia	4,957	NJAC	2001	2001
Claremont-Mudd-Scripps	Stags	Claremont	California	8,500	SCIAC	1958	1973
Coast Guard	Bears	New London	Connecticut	1,045	NEWMAC		1973
Coe	Kohawks	Cedar Rapids	Iowa	1,400	ARC	1891	1973
Colby	Mules	Waterville	Maine	1,917	NESCAC	1892	1973
TCNJ	Lions	Ewing	New Jersey	7,340	NJAC	1921	1973
Concordia (IL)	Cougars	River Forest	Illinois	6,005	NACC	1923	1981 (Note: Concordia was previously a Division III member between 1973 and 1975.)
Concordia (Moorhead)	Cobbers	Moorhead	Minnesota	2,531	MIAC	1916	1977
Concordia (WI)	Falcons	Mequon	Wisconsin	7,721	NACC (Note: Joining CCIW in 2027.)	1980	1997
Cornell (IA)	Rams	Mount Vernon	Iowa	1,033	MWC	1891	1973
Cortland	Red Dragons	Cortland	New York	6,858	Empire 8	1893	1973
Crown	Polars	St. Bonifacius	Minnesota	1,320	UMAC	2008	2008
Curry	Colonels	Milton	Massachusetts	4,700	CNE	1965	1973
Dean	Bulldogs	Franklin	Massachusetts	1,355	MASCAC	1957	2017
Delaware Valley	Aggies	Doylestown	Pennsylvania	1,950	MAC	1948	1973
Denison	Big Red	Granville	Ohio	2,300	NCAC	1889	1973
DePauw^	Tigers	Greencastle	Indiana	2,315	NCAC	1884	1973
Dickinson	Red Devils	Carlisle	Pennsylvania	2,420	Centennial	1896	1973
Dubuque	Spartans	Dubuque	Iowa	2,190	ARC	1909	1976
East Texas Baptist	Tigers	Marshall	Texas	1,613	ASC	1924	2000
Eastern	Eagles	St. Davids	Pennsylvania	3,420	MAC	2022	2022
Elmhurst	Bluejays	Elmhurst	Illinois	3,350	CCIW	1920	1973
Endicott	Gulls	Beverly	Massachusetts	5,685	CNE	2003	2003
Eureka	Red Devils	Eureka	Illinois	567	NACC	1891	1978
Fairleigh Dickinson-Florham	Devils	Madison	New Jersey	2,546	MAC	1974	1974
Fitchburg State	Falcons	Fitchburg	Massachusetts	4,659	MASCAC	1984	1984
Framingham State	Rams	Framingham	Massachusetts	4,876	MASCAC	1974	1974
Franklin	Grizzlies	Franklin	Indiana	1,000	HCAC	1886	1992
Franklin & Marshall^	Diplomats	Lancaster	Pennsylvania	2,426	Centennial	1887	1973
Gallaudet	Bison	Washington	District of Columbia	1,860	SCAC	1883	2007 (Note: Gallaudet was previously a Division III member between 1973 and 1979, 1987 and 1994, and 2001 and 2003.)
Geneva^	Golden Tornadoes	Beaver Falls	Pennsylvania	1,418	PAC	1890	2011
George Fox	Bruins	Newberg	Oregon	3,747	NWC	2014	2014
Gettysburg	Bullets	Gettysburg	Pennsylvania	2,451	Centennial	1890	1973
Greensboro	Pride	Greensboro	North Carolina	1,300	USA South	1997	1997
Greenville	Panthers	Greenville	Illinois	872	UMAC	1998	1998
Grinnell^	Pioneers	Grinnell	Iowa	1,733	MWC	1889	1973
Grove City	Wolverines	Grove City	Pennsylvania	2,400	PAC	1892	1973
Guilford	Quakers	Greensboro	North Carolina	2,137	ODAC	1893	1990
Gustavus Adolphus	Gusties	St. Peter	Minnesota	2,450	MIAC	1960	1973
Hamilton	Continentals	Clinton	New York	1,850	NESCAC	1890	1973
Hamline	Pipers	St. Paul	Minnesota	3,717	MIAC	1882	1973
Hampden-Sydney	Tigers	Hampden Sydney	Virginia	993	ODAC	1892	1973
Hanover	Panthers	Hanover	Indiana	1,089	HCAC	1898	1992
Hardin-Simmons^	Cowboys	Abilene	Texas	2,392	ASC	1897	1994 (Note: Hardin-Simmons was previously a Division III member between 1990 and 1992.)
Hartwick	Hawks	Oneonta	New York	1,200	Empire 8	1928	1992
Heidelberg^	Student Princes	Tiffin	Ohio	1,300	OAC	1892	1973
Hendrix	Warriors	Conway	Arkansas	1,348	SCAC	1906	2013
Hilbert	Hawks	Hamburg	New York	1,100	Liberty	2022	2022
Hiram	Terriers	Hiram	Ohio	1,116	PAC	1892	1973
Hobart	Statesmen	Geneva	New York	2,229	Liberty	1891	1973
Hope	Flying Dutchmen	Holland	Michigan	3,149	MIAA	1902	1973
Howard Payne	Yellow Jackets	Brownwood	Texas	1,170	ASC	1903	1994
Huntingdon	Hawks	Montgomery	Alabama	1,107	USA South	2003	2003
Husson	Eagles	Bangor	Maine	3,500	CNE	2003	2003
Illinois College	Blueboys	Jacksonville	Illinois	1,048	MWC	1890	1978
Illinois Wesleyan	Titans	Bloomington	Illinois	1,893	CCIW	1887	1978
Ithaca	Bombers	Ithaca	New York	6,266	Liberty	1930	1973
John Carroll^	Blue Streaks	University Heights	Ohio	3,673	NCAC	1920	1973
Johns Hopkins	Blue Jays	Baltimore	Maryland	26,402	Centennial	1882	1973
Juniata	Eagles	Huntingdon	Pennsylvania	1,573	Landmark	1920	1973
Kalamazoo	Hornets	Kalamazoo	Michigan	1,436	MIAA	1892	1973
Kean	Cougars	Union Township	New Jersey	16,633	NJAC	1970	1973
Kenyon	Owls	Gambier	Ohio	1,676	NCAC	1890	1973
Keystone	Giants	La Plume	Pennsylvania	1,600	Independent	1936	2021
King's	Monarchs	Wilkes-Barre	Pennsylvania	2,300	MAC	1946	1994
Knox	Prairie Fire	Galesburg	Illinois	1,200	MWC	1884	1973
La Verne	Leopards	La Verne	California	2,713	SCIAC	1921	1982
LaGrange	Panthers	LaGrange	Georgia	1,137	USA South	2006	2006
Lake Forest^	Foresters	Lake Forest	Illinois	1,592	MWC	1882	1973
Lakeland	Muskies	Sheboygan	Wisconsin	3,973	NACC	1934	1994
Lawrence	Vikings	Appleton	Wisconsin	1,555	MWC	1893	1973
Lebanon Valley	Flying Dutchmen	Annville	Pennsylvania	1,916	MAC	1897	1973
Lewis & Clark	River Otters	Portland	Oregon	3,390	NWC	1893	1998
Linfield	Wildcats	McMinnville	Oregon	2,282	NWC	1896	1998
Loras	Duhawks	Dubuque	Iowa	1,600	ARC	1907	1986
Luther	Norse	Decorah	Iowa	2,337	MWC	1892	1973
Lycoming	Warriors	Williamsport	Pennsylvania	1,400	Landmark	1954	1973
Lyon	Scots	Batesville	Arkansas	2,684	SCAC	2015	2023
Macalester	Scots	Saint Paul	Minnesota	2,174	MIAC	1887	1973
Maine Maritime	Mariners	Castine	Maine	941	CNE	1946	2024 (Note: Maine Maritime was previously a Division III member football between 1973 and 2019 when the program was suspended indefinitely due to COVID-19 in 2020.)
Manchester (Note: Manchester will leave D-III to join NAIA in 2027.)	Spartans	North Manchester	Indiana	1,770	HCAC		1992
Marietta	Pioneers	Marietta	Ohio	1,200	OAC	1892	1973
Martin Luther	Knights	New Ulm	Minnesota	860	UMAC		1991
Mary Hardin-Baylor	Crusaders	Belton	Texas	3,914	ASC	1998	2000
Maryville (TN)	Scots	Maryville	Tennessee	1,213	SAA	1889	1973
UMass Dartmouth	Corsairs	North Dartmouth	Massachusetts	8,513	MASCAC	1988	1988
Massachusetts Maritime	Buccaneers	Buzzards Bay	Massachusetts	1,637	MASCAC	1973	1973
McDaniel^	Green Terror	Westminster	Maryland	1,629	Centennial	1891	1973
McMurry	War Hawks	Abilene	Texas	1,176	ASC	1923	2015 (Note: McMurry was previously a Division III member between 1977 and 2011.)
Merchant Marine	Mariners	Kings Point	New York	1,011	NEWMAC		1989
Methodist	Monarchs	Fayetteville	North Carolina	2,200	USA South	1989	1989
Middlebury	Panthers	Middlebury	Vermont	2,549	NESCAC	1893	1973
Millikin^	Big Blue	Decatur	Illinois	2,000	CCIW	1903	1976
Millsaps^	Majors	Jackson	Mississippi	985	SAA (Note: Joining SCAC in 2027.)	1920	1973
Minnesota Morris	Cougars	Morris	Minnesota	1,431	UMAC	1961	2008 (Note: Minnesota–Morris was previously a Division III member between 1978 and 1984.)
Misericordia	Cougars	Dallas	Pennsylvania	3,196	MAC	2012	2012
MIT	Engineers	Cambridge	Massachusetts	11,520	NEWMAC	1881	1988
Monmouth (IL)	Fighting Scots	Monmouth	Illinois	1,100	MWC	1888	1973
Montclair State	Red Hawks	Upper Montclair	New Jersey	21,115	NJAC	1928	1973
Moravian	Greyhounds	Bethlehem	Pennsylvania	2,075	Landmark	1931	1973
Morrisville	Mustangs	Morrisville	New York	2,986	Empire 8		2009
Mount Union^	Purple Raiders	Alliance	Ohio	2,200	OAC	1893	1973
Mount St. Joseph	Lions	Cincinnati	Ohio	1,889	HCAC		1998
Muhlenberg	Mules	Allentown	Pennsylvania	2,225	Centennial	1900	1973
Muskingum	Fighting Muskies	New Concord	Ohio	2,600	OAC	1895	1973
Nebraska Wesleyan	Prairie Wolves	Lincoln	Nebraska	2,095	ARC	1896	1973
New England (ME)	Nor'easters	Biddeford	Maine	13,743	CNE	2018	2018
New England College	Pilgrims	Henniker	New Hampshire	4,327	CNE	2025	2025
Nichols	Bison	Dudley	Massachusetts	1,570	CNE	1932	1973
North Carolina Wesleyan	Battling Bishops	Rocky Mount	North Carolina	2,093	USA South		2004
North Central (IL)	Cardinals	Naperville	Illinois	3,000	CCIW	1898	1973
North Park	Vikings	Chicago	Illinois	3,136	CCIW	1934	1973
Northwestern (MN)	Eagles	Roseville	Minnesota	1,800	UMAC	1973	2009
Norwich	Cadets	Northfield	Vermont	3,400	NEWMAC	1893	1973
Oberlin^	Yeomen	Oberlin	Ohio	2,785	NCAC	1891	1973
Ohio Northern	Polar Bears	Ada	Ohio	3,088	OAC	1893	1973
Ohio Wesleyan	Battling Bishops	Delaware	Ohio	1,600	NCAC	1890	1973
Olivet	Comets	Olivet	Michigan	1,040	MIAA	1884	1973
Otterbein	Cardinals	Westerville	Ohio	2,342	OAC	1890	1973
Pacific (OR)	Boxers	Forest Grove	Oregon	3,900	NWC	2010	2010
Pacific Lutheran	Lutes	Tacoma	Washington	3,100	NWC	1927	1998
Plymouth State	Panthers	Plymouth	New Hampshire	4,491	MASCAC	1970	1973
Pomona-Pitzer	Sagehens	Claremont	California	2,498	SCIAC	1893	1973
Puget Sound	Loggers	Tacoma	Washington	2,666	NWC	1901	1999
Randolph-Macon	Yellow Jackets	Ashland	Virginia	1,419	ODAC	1881	1973
Redlands	Bulldogs	Redlands	California	4,898	SCIAC	1910	1982 (Note: Redlands was previously a Division III member between 1973 and 1978.)
Rhodes^	Lynx	Memphis	Tennessee	2,030	SAA	1896	1984
Ripon	Red Hawks	Ripon	Wisconsin	807	MWC	1891	1973
Roanoke	Maroons	Salem	Virginia	1,920	ODAC	2025	2025
Rochester	Yellowjackets	Rochester	New York	12,233	Liberty	1889	1973
Rockford	Regents	Rockford	Illinois	1,298	NACC	2000	2000
Rose-Hulman^	Engineers	Terre Haute	Indiana	2,233	HCAC	1892	1973
Rowan	Profs	Glassboro	New Jersey	19,465	NJAC	1947	1973
RPI	Engineers	Troy	New York	8,142	Liberty	1886	1973
Saint Francis^	Red Wolves	Loretto	Pennsylvania	2,111	PAC	1892	2026 (Note: Saint Francis was previously a Division III member between 1978 and 1992.)
St. John Fisher	Cardinals	Pittsford	New York	3,700	Empire 8	1971	1988
Saint John's (MN)	Johnnies	Collegeville	Minnesota	3,640	MIAC	1900	1973
St. Lawrence	Saints	Canton	New York	2,493	Liberty	1894	1973
St. Norbert	Green Knights	De Pere	Wisconsin	2,132	NACC	1931	1973
St. Olaf	Oles	Northfield	Minnesota	3,048	MIAC	1917	1973
St. Scholastica	Saints	Duluth	Minnesota	3,906	MIAC	2008	2008
St. Vincent	Bearcats	Latrobe	Pennsylvania	1,867	PAC	1923	2010
Salisbury	Seagulls	Salisbury	Maryland	8,650	NJAC	1972	1973
Salve Regina	Seahawks	Newport	Rhode Island	2,600	NEWMAC	1992	1993
Schreiner	Mountaineers	Kerrville	Texas	1,326	ASC	1925	2026
Sewanee^	Tigers	Sewanee	Tennessee	1,653	SAA	1891	1973
Shenandoah	Hornets	Winchester	Virginia	2,034	ODAC	2000	2000
Simpson	Storm	Indianola	Iowa	1,444	ARC	1893	1973
Southern Virginia	Knights	Buena Vista	Virginia	1,444	USA South	2003	2013
Southwestern^	Pirates	Georgetown	Texas	1,515	SAA	1908	2013
Springfield	Pride	Springfield	Massachusetts	5,021	NEWMAC	1890	1995
Stevenson	Mustangs	Owings Mills	Maryland	3,615	MAC	2011	2011
SUNY-Maritime	Privateers	Bronx	New York	1,734	NEWMAC	1985	2006 (Note: SUNY Maritime was previously a Division III member in 1985 and 1988.)
Susquehanna	River Hawks	Selinsgrove	Pennsylvania	2,203	Landmark	1892	1973
Texas Lutheran	Bulldogs	Seguin	Texas	2,203	SCAC	1912	2002
Thiel	Tomcats	Greenville	Pennsylvania	894	PAC	1892	1973
Trine	Thunder	Angola	Indiana	5,074	MIAA	1995	2007
Trinity (CT)	Bantams	Hartford	Connecticut	2,235	NESCAC	1877	1973
Trinity (TX)	Tigers	San Antonio	Texas	2,606	SAA	1901	1973
Tufts^	Jumbos	Medford	Massachusetts	6,200	NESCAC	1875	1973
Union	Garnet Chargers	Schenectady	New York	2,200	Liberty	1886	1973
Ursinus	Bears	Collegeville	Pennsylvania	1,472	Centennial	1893	1973
Utica	Pioneers	Utica	New York	4,184	Empire 8	2000	2001
Vermont State Castleton	Spartans	Castleton	Vermont	1,850	NJAC (Note: Joining MASCAC in 2027.)	2009	2009
Wabash^	Little Giants	Crawfordsville	Indiana	882	NCAC	1884	1973
Wartburg	Knights	Waverly	Iowa	1,600	ARC	1929	1973
Washington & Jefferson*	Presidents	Washington	Pennsylvania	1,405	PAC	1890	1973
Washington & Lee^	Generals	Lexington	Virginia	2,223	ODAC	1890	1973
Washington (St. Louis)^	Bears	St. Louis	Missouri	15,045	NCAC	1887	1973
Waynesburg	Yellow Jackets	Waynesburg	Pennsylvania	1,800	PAC	1895	1990
Wesleyan^	Cardinals	Middletown	Connecticut	3,230	NESCAC	1875	1973
Western Connecticut	Wolves	Danbury	Connecticut	5,246	Landmark	1969	1977
Western New England	Golden Bears	Springfield	Massachusetts	3,955	CNE	1981	1981
Westfield State	Owls	Westfield	Massachusetts	5,400	MASCAC	1982	1982
Westminster (MO)	Blue Jays	Fulton	Missouri	658	UMAC	1897	1997
Westminster (PA)	Titans	New Wilmington	Pennsylvania	1,138	PAC	1891	2002
Wheaton (IL)	Thunder	Wheaton	Illinois	2,810	CCIW	1914	1973
Whittier	Poets	Whittier	California	815	SCIAC	1907	2026 (Note: Whittier was previously a Division III member between 1973 and 2022.)
Whitworth	Pirates	Spokane	Washington	3,100	NWC		1998
Widener	Pride	Chester	Pennsylvania	6,464	MAC	1879	1973
Wilkes	Colonels	Wilkes-Barre	Pennsylvania	2,245	Landmark	1946	1973
Willamette	Bearcats	Salem	Oregon	2,245	NWC	1894	1998
William Paterson	Pioneers	Wayne	New Jersey	10,252	NJAC	1972	1973
Williams	Ephs	Williamstown	Massachusetts	2,081	NESCAC	1881	1973
Wilmington	Quakers	Wilmington	Ohio	1,103	OAC	1900	1990 (Note: Wilmington was previously a Division III member between 1977 and 1980.)
Wisconsin Lutheran	Warriors	Milwaukee	Wisconsin	1,188	NACC	2000	2000
Wisconsin-Eau Claire	Blugolds	Eau Claire	Wisconsin	10,737	WIAC	1917	1986
Wisconsin-La Crosse	Eagles	La Crosse	Wisconsin	9,617	WIAC	1911	1983
Wisconsin-Oshkosh	Titans	Oshkosh	Wisconsin	13,902	WIAC	1893	1975
Wisconsin-Platteville	Pioneers	Platteville	Wisconsin	8,712	WIAC	1905	1980
Wisconsin-River Falls	Falcons	River Falls	Wisconsin	6,061	WIAC	1895	1982 (Note: Wisconsin-River Falls was previously a Division III member in 1977.)
Wisconsin-Stevens Point	Pointers	Stevens Point	Wisconsin	7,725	WIAC	1894	1980
Wisconsin-Stout	Blue Devils	Menomonie	Wisconsin	9,401	WIAC	1911	1980
Wisconsin-Whitewater	Warhawks	Whitewater	Wisconsin	11,142	WIAC	1889	1980 (Note: Wisconsin-Whitewater was previously a Division III member between 1973 and 1977.)
Wittenberg	Tigers	Springfield	Ohio	1,794	NCAC	1892	1973
Wooster	Fighting Scots	Wooster	Ohio	2,000	NCAC	1889	1973
WPI	Engineers	Worcester	Massachusetts	6,077	NEWMAC	1887	1973
Worcester State	Lancers	Worcester	Massachusetts	6,434	MASCAC	1985	1985

== Future Division III football programs ==
School	Nickname	City	State/ province	Enrollment	Future conference	Note	Begins play
Saint Anselm	Hawks	Goffstown	New Hampshire	2,111	NEWMAC	(Note: Transitioning from Division II.)	2027

== Former NCAA Division III football programs ==
School	Nickname	City	State	First Division III season	Last Division III season	Current level (Note: As of the 2026 football season.)
University at Albany	Great Danes	Albany	New York	1973	1994	Division I FCS
Albany State University	Golden Rams	Albany	Georgia	1973	1975	Division II
American International College	Yellow Jackets	Springfield	Massachusetts	1973	1973	Division II
Anna Maria College	Amcats	Paxton	Massachusetts	2009	2025	College closed
Ashland University	Eagles	Ashland	Ohio	1973	1979	Division II
Assumption University	Greyhounds	Worcester	Massachusetts	1988	1992	Division II
Becker College	Hawks	Leicester	Massachusetts	2005	2019	College closed
Bentley University	Falcons	Waltham	Massachusetts	1988	1992	Division II
Blackburn College	Beavers	Carlinville	Illinois	1990	2008	Program dropped
Birmingham–Southern College	Panthers	Birmingham	Alabama	2009	2023	College closed
Commonwealth University-Bloomsburg	Huskies	Bloomsburg	Pennsylvania	1973	1979	Division II
Bowie State University	Bulldogs	Bowie	Maryland	1973	1979	Division II
University of Bridgeport	Purple Knights	Bridgeport	Connecticut	1973	1973	Program dropped
Brooklyn College	Kingsmen	Brooklyn	New York	1978	1991	Program dropped
University at Buffalo	Bulls	Amherst	New York	1978	1992	Division I FBS
University of California, Santa Barbara (UC Santa Barbara)	Gauchos	Isla Vista	California	1986	1990	Program dropped
California Institute of Technology (Caltech)	Beavers	Pasadena	California	1973	1977	Program dropped
California State University, Chico (Chico State)	Wildcats	Chico	California	1973	1977	Program dropped
Cameron University	Aggies	Lawton	Oklahoma	1973	1973	Program dropped
Canisius College (Note: Now Canisius University.)	Golden Griffins	Buffalo	New York	1975	1992	Program dropped
Charleston Southern University	Buccaneers	North Charleston	South Carolina	1991	1992	Division I FCS
Cheyney University of Pennsylvania	Wolves	Cheyney	Pennsylvania	1973	1979	Program dropped
Chowan University	Hawks	Murfreesboro	North Carolina	1997	2004	Division II
Clark Atlanta University	Panthers	Atlanta	Georgia	1973	1979	Division II
University of Central Florida (Note: Though now athletically branded and academically marketed as UCF, this usage was not adopted until after the school left D-III.)	Golden Knights (Note: Now nicknamed Knights.)	Orlando	Florida	1980	1981	Division I FBS
Colorado College	Tigers	Colorado Springs	Colorado	1973	2008	Program dropped
Colorado School of Mines (Colorado Mines)	Orediggers	Golden	Colorado	1973	1973	Division II
C. W. Post College (Note: Now marketed as LIU Post, one of the two primary campuses of Long Island University.)	Pioneers	Brookville	New York	1975	1977	Division I FCS (Note: As the LIU Sharks, following the 2019 merger of the LIU Post athletic program with the NCAA Division I non-football program of LIU's other primary campus in Brooklyn. Post was the only one of the two campuses that sponsored football.)
C. W. Post College	Pioneers	Brookville	New York	1985	1992	Division I FCS
Davidson College	Wildcats	Davidson	North Carolina	1990	1992	Division I FCS
University of Dayton	Flyers	Dayton	Ohio	1976	1992	Division I FCS
Defiance College	Yellow Jackets	Defiance	Ohio	1973	1975	NAIA
Defiance College	Yellow Jackets	Defiance	Ohio	1991	2023	NAIA
Delaware State University	Hornets	Dover	Delaware	1973	1977	Division I FCS
University of the District of Columbia	Firebirds	Washington	District of Columbia	1978	1978	Program dropped
Drake University	Bulldogs	Des Moines	Iowa	1987	1992	Division I FCS
Duquesne University	Dukes	Pittsburgh	Pennsylvania	1979	1992	Division I FCS
Earlham College	Quakers	Richmond	Indiana	1982	2018	Program dropped
Eastern Oregon University	Mountaineers	La Grande	Oregon	1999	2003	NAIA
University of Evansville	Purple Aces	Evansville	Indiana	1973	1977	Program dropped
University of Evansville	Purple Aces	Evansville	Indiana	1989	1992	Program dropped
Ferris State University	Bulldogs	Big Rapids	Michigan	1975	1976	Division II
Ferrum College	Panthers	Ferrum	Virginia	1985	2024	Division II
Finlandia University	Lions	Hancock	Michigan	2015	2022	College closed
Fisk University	Bulldogs	Nashville	Tennessee	1973	1983	NAIA
Fordham University	Rams	Bronx	New York	1973	1988	Division I FCS
Fort Valley State University	Wildcats	Fort Valley	Georgia	1973	1980	Division II
Frostburg State University	Bobcats	Frostburg	Maryland	1977	2018	Division II
Gannon University	Golden Knights	Erie	Pennsylvania	1989	1992	Division II
Georgetown University	Hoyas	Washington	D.C.	1973	1992	Division I FCS
Hillsdale College	Chargers	Hillsdale	Michigan	1975	1975	Division II
Hofstra University	Pride	Hempstead	New York	1973	1992	Program dropped
Humboldt State University (Note: Now known as California State Polytechnic University, Humboldt, and athletically branded and academically marketed as Cal Poly Humboldt.)	Lumberjacks	Arcata	California	1975	1979	Program dropped
University of Illinois, Chicago Circle (Note: Athletically branded as "Chicago Circle" when it played football. Now known as the University of Illinois Chicago, and athletically branded and academically marketed as UIC.)	Chikas (Note: Nickname dropped shortly after the team's last season. The current nickname of Flames was adopted in 1982.)	Chicago	Illinois	1973	1973	Program dropped
Iona College (Note: Now Iona University.)	Gaels	New Rochelle	New York	1978	1992	Program dropped
Iowa Wesleyan University	Tigers	Mt. Pleasant	Iowa	2013	2020	College closed
James Madison University	Dukes	Harrisonburg	Virginia	1977	1979	Division I FBS
Kentucky Wesleyan College	Panthers	Owensboro	Kentucky	1983	1992	Division II
Knoxville College	Bulldogs	Knoxville	Tennessee	1973	1988	Athletics dropped
Kutztown University of Pennsylvania	Golden Bears	Kutztown	Pennsylvania	1973	1979	Division II
Lane College	Dragons	Jackson	Tennessee	1973	1987	Division II
Livingston University (Note: Now the University of West Alabama.)	Tigers	Livingston	Alabama	1973	1973	Division II
Commonwealth University-Lock Haven	Bald Eagles	Lock Haven	Pennsylvania	1973	1979	Division II
Louisiana Christian University	Wildcats	Pineville	Louisiana	2000	2020	NAIA
MacMurray College	Highlanders	Jacksonville	Illinois	1984	2019	College closed
Commonwealth University-Mansfield	Mountaineers	Mansfield	Pennsylvania	1973	1979	Program dropped
Maranatha Baptist University	Sabercats	Watertown	Wisconsin	1974	2016	Program dropped
Marist College (Note: Now Marist University.)	Red Foxes	Poughkeepsie	New York	1978	1992	Division I FCS
University of Massachusetts Boston (UMass Boston)	Beacons	Boston	Massachusetts	1988	2000	Program dropped
University of Massachusetts Lowell (UMass Lowell)	River Hawks	Lowell	Massachusetts	1981	1992	Program dropped
Mercyhurst University	Lakers	Erie	Pennsylvania	1982	1992	Division I FCS
Menlo College	Oaks	Atherton	California	1986	2009	Program dropped
Merrimack College	Warriors	North Andover	Massachusetts	1989	1989	Division I FCS
Miles College	Golden Bears	Fairfield	Alabama	1973	1987	Division II
Millersville University of Pennsylvania	Marauders	Millersville	Pennsylvania	1973	1979	Division II
Minnesota State University, Mankato (Note: Now athletically branded as Minnesota State, with no city identifier.)	Mavericks	Mankato	Minnesota	1977	1977	Division II
Mississippi College (Note: Now Mississippi Christian University.)	Choctaws	Clinton	Mississippi	1997	2013	Program dropped
Morehouse College	Maroon Tigers	Atlanta	Georgia	1973	1980	Program dropped
Mount Ida College	Mustangs	Newton	Massachusetts	2002	2017	College closed
University of New Haven	Chargers	West Haven	Connecticut	1973	1973	Division I FCS
University of New Haven	Chargers	West Haven	Connecticut	1977	1980	Division I FCS
New Jersey City University (Note: Now Kean Jersey City.)	Gothic Knights	Jersey City	New Jersey	1973	2002	Program dropped
New York Institute of Technology	Bears	Old Westbury	New York	1973	1973	Program dropped
State University of New York at Oswego	Lakers	Oswego	New York	1976	1976	Program dropped
Occidental College	Tigers	Los Angeles	California	1973	2019	Program dropped
Pace University	Setters	Pleasantville	New York	1978	1992	Division II
State University of New York at Plattsburgh	Cardinals	Plattsburgh	New York	1973	1978	Program dropped
Presentation College	Saints	Aberdeen	South Dakota	2011	2012	College closed
Principia College	Panthers	Elsah	Illinois	1973	2008	Program dropped
Quincy University	Hawks	Quincy	Illinois	1987	1992	Division II
Ramapo College	Roadrunners	Mahwah	New Jersey	1981	1992	Program dropped
Rochester Institute of Technology (RIT)	Tigers	Henrietta	New York	1973	1977	Program dropped
Sacred Heart University	Pioneers	Fairfield	Connecticut	1991	1992	Division I FCS
St. John's University	Redmen (Note: The current athletic nickname of Red Storm was not adopted until 1994, two years after football was dropped.)	Queens	New York	1978	1992	Program dropped
Saint Joseph's College	Pumas	Rensselaer	Indiana	1973	1978	College closed
Saint Mary's College of California	Gaels	Moraga	California	1973	1980	Program dropped
Saint Peter's College (Note: Now Saint Peter's University.)	Peacocks	Jersey City	New Jersey	1973	1992	Program dropped
University of St. Thomas	Tommies	Saint Paul	Minnesota	1973	2020	Division I FCS
Samford University	Bulldogs	Homewood	Alabama	1985	1988	Division I FCS
University of San Diego	Toreros	San Diego	California	1973	1992	Division I FCS
San Francisco State University	Gators	San Francisco	California	1973	1978	Program dropped
Savannah State University	Tigers	Savannah	Georgia	1973	1980	Division II
Seton Hall University	Pirates	South Orange	New Jersey	1973	1976	Program dropped
Seton Hall University	Pirates	South Orange	New Jersey	1978	1980	Program dropped
Shepherd University	Rams	Shepherdstown	West Virginia	1973	1975	Division II
Shippensburg University of Pennsylvania	Red Raiders	Shippensburg	Pennsylvania	1973	1975	Division II
Siena College (Note: Now Siena University.)	Saints	Colonie	New York	1988	1992	Program dropped
Slippery Rock University of Pennsylvania	The Rock	Slippery Rock	Pennsylvania	1973	1978	Division II
Sonoma State University	Cossacks	Rohnert Park	California	1980	1983	Program dropped
Stillman College	Tigers	Tuscaloosa	Alabama	1999	2003	Program dropped
Stonehill College	Skyhawks	Easton	Massachusetts	1989	1992	Division II
Stony Brook University	Seawolves	Stony Brook	New York	1983	1994	Division I FCS
Sul Ross State University	Lobos	Alpine	Texas	1997	2023	Division II
Swarthmore College	Garnet	Swarthmore	Pennsylvania	1973	2000	Program dropped
Tarleton State University (Note: Now athletically branded as Tarleton, without "State".)	Texans	Stephenville	Texas	1977	1977	Division I FCS
Thomas More University	Saints	Crestview Hills	Kentucky	1990	2018	Division II
Towson State University (Note: Now Towson University.)	Tigers	Towson	Maryland	1973	1979	Division I FCS
Upper Iowa University	Peacocks	Fayette	Iowa	1976	2002	Division II
Upsala College	Vikings	East Orange	New Jersey	1973	1996	College closed
Valparaiso University	Crusaders (Note: Nickname changed to Beacons in 2021.)	Valparaiso	Indiana	1973	1978	Division I FCS
Villanova University	Wildcats	Villanova	Pennsylvania	1985	1986	Division I FCS
Wagner College	Seahawks	Staten Island	New York	1973	1992	Division I FCS
Wesley College	Wolverines	Dover	Delaware	1986	2019	College merged
West Georgia College (Note: Now the University of West Georgia.)	Wolves	Carrollton	Georgia	1981	1982	Division I FCS
William Penn University	Statesmen	Oskaloosa	Iowa	1976	2000	NAIA
Winona State University	Warriors	Winona	Minnesota	1975	1975	Division II
University of Wisconsin–Superior	Yellowjackets	Superior	Wisconsin	1973	1992	Program dropped

== See also ==
- NCAA Division III Football Championship
- List of NCAA Division III Football Championship appearances by team
- List of NCAA Division III institutions
- List of current NCAA Division III football coaches
- List of NCAA Division I institutions
- List of NCAA Division II institutions
- List of NCAA Division I FBS football programs
- List of NCAA Division I FCS football programs
- List of NCAA Division II football programs
- List of NAIA football programs
- List of community college football programs
- List of colleges and universities with club football teams
- List of defunct college football teams
