= List of NCAA Division II football programs =

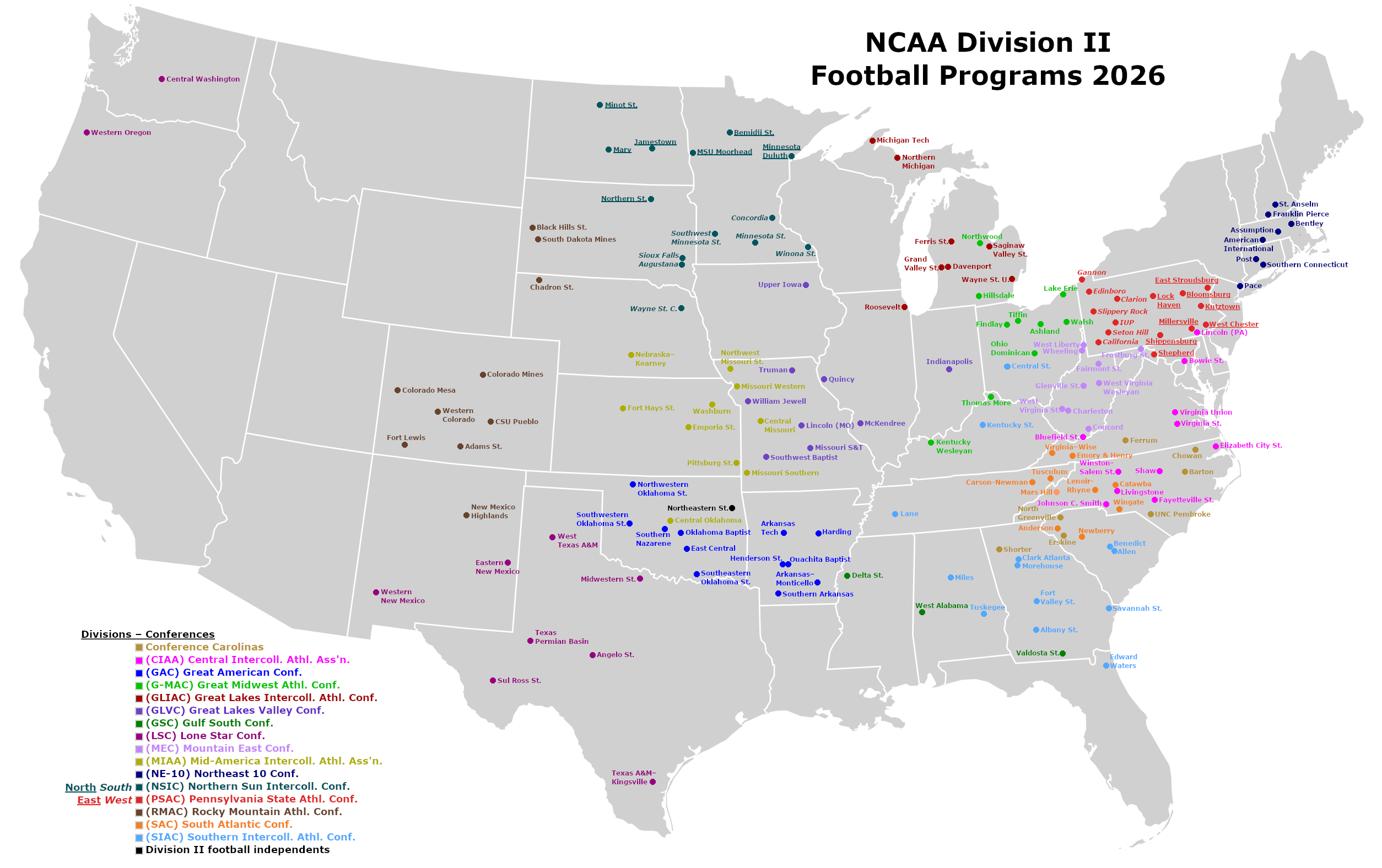
Map of NCAA Division II football programs, 2026

This is a list of the schools in Division II of the National Collegiate Athletic Association (NCAA) in the United States that have football as a varsity sport. In the 2026 season, there are a total of 160 Division II football programs - one fewer than 2025.

== NCAA Division II football programs ==
- Reclassifying institutions in yellow.
- Departing institutions in red.

School	Common name	Nickname	City	State (Note: 16 states (Alaska, Arizona, California, Delaware, Hawaii, Idaho, Louisiana, Maine, Montana, Nevada, New Jersey, Rhode Island, Utah, Vermont, Wisconsin, Wyoming) and Washington, D.C., do not currently have Division II football programs.)	First Division II season	Conference (Note: According to conferences in football, not necessarily a team's primary conference.)	Stadium	Cap.	Note
Adams State University	Adams State	Grizzlies	Alamosa	Colorado	1990 (Note: Adams State was previously a Division II member during the 1983 season.)	RMAC	Rex Stadium	6,000	
Albany State University	Albany State	Golden Rams	Albany	Georgia	1976	SIAC	Albany State University Coliseum	11,000	
Allen University	Allen	Yellow Jackets	Columbia	South Carolina	2021	SIAC	Westwood High School Stadium (Blythewood, SC)	Varies	
American International College	American International (Note: Also known as AIC.)	Yellow Jackets	Springfield	Massachusetts	1974	NE-10	Ronald J. Abdow Field	4,000	
Anderson University	Anderson (Note: Also known as Anderson (SC).)	Trojans	Anderson	South Carolina	2024	SAC	Spero Financial Field	5,000	
Angelo State University	Angelo State	Rams	San Angelo	Texas	1981	LSC	LeGrand Stadium at 1st Community Credit Union Field	5,670	
Arkansas Tech University	Arkansas Tech	Wonder Boys	Russellville	Arkansas	1997	GAC	Thone Stadium at Buerkle Field	6,500	
University of Arkansas at Monticello	Arkansas–Monticello	Boll Weevils	Monticello	Arkansas	1997	GAC	Willis Convoy Leslie Cotton Boll Stadium	5,000	
Ashland University	Ashland	Eagles	Ashland	Ohio	1980	G-MAC	Jack Miller Stadium	6,000	
Assumption University	Assumption	Greyhounds	Worcester	Massachusetts	1993	NE-10	Greyhound Stadium	1,200	
Augustana University	Augustana (SD)	Vikings	Sioux Falls	South Dakota	1973	NSIC	Kirkeby-Over Stadium	6,500	
Barton College	Barton	Bulldogs	Wilson	North Carolina	2021	Carolinas	Electric Supply Company Field	4,000	
Bemidji State University	Bemidji State	Beavers	Bemidji	Minnesota	1979	NSIC	Chet Anderson Stadium	4,000	
Benedict College	Benedict	Tigers	Columbia	South Carolina	2002	SIAC	Charlie W. Johnson Stadium	11,000	
Bentley University	Bentley	Falcons	Waltham	Massachusetts	1993	NE-10	Bentley Athletic Field	3,100	
Black Hills State University	Black Hills State	Yellow Jackets	Spearfish	South Dakota	2011	RMAC	Lyle Hare Stadium	4,200	
Bluefield State University	Bluefield State	Big Blues	Bluefield	West Virginia	2021	CIAA	Mitchell Stadium	10,000	
Bowie State University	Bowie State	Bulldogs	Bowie	Maryland	1980	CIAA	Bulldog Stadium	2,964	
PennWest California (Note: Institutional name changed from California University of Pennsylvania in July 2022. The athletic program continues to be known as California, typically referred to by media as "California (PA)" to distinguish from the D-I program of the University of California, Berkeley, known simply as "California".)	California (PA)	Vulcans	California	Pennsylvania	1973	PSAC	Hepner-Bailey Field at Adamson Stadium	6,500	
Carson-Newman University	Carson–Newman	Eagles	Jefferson City	Tennessee	1991	SAC	Burke-Tarr Stadium	5,500	
Catawba College	Catawba	Indians	Salisbury	North Carolina	1991	SAC	Shuford Stadium	4,500	
University of Central Missouri	Central Missouri	Mules	Warrensburg	Missouri	1973	MIAA	Audrey J. Walton Stadium	12,000	
University of Central Oklahoma	Central Oklahoma	Bronchos	Edmond	Oklahoma	1988 (Note: Central Oklahoma, known then as Central State, was previously a Division II member between 1976 and 1978.)	MIAA	Chad Richison Stadium	12,000	
Central State University	Central State	Marauders	Wilberforce	Ohio	2008 (Note: Central State was previously a Division II member between 1973 and 1986.)	SIAC	McPherson Stadium	7,000	
Central Washington University	Central Washington	Wildcats	Ellensburg	Washington	1998 (Note: Central Washington was previously a Division II member between 1973 and 1975 and then again between 1982 and 1983.)	LSC	Tomlinson Stadium	4,000	(Note: Central Washington - LSC affiliate member / Primary: Great Northwest Athletic Conference.)
Chadron State College	Chadron State	Eagles	Chadron	Nebraska	1990	RMAC	Elliot Field	3,800	
University of Charleston	Charleston (Note: Also known as Charleston (WV).)	Golden Eagles	Charleston	West Virginia	2003	MEC	University of Charleston Stadium	18,500	
Chowan University	Chowan	Hawks	Murfreesboro	North Carolina	2007	Carolinas	Garrison Stadium	5,000	
PennWest Clarion (Note: Institutional name changed from Clarion University of Pennsylvania in July 2022. The athletic program continues to be known as Clarion.)	Clarion	Golden Eagles	Clarion	Pennsylvania	1973	PSAC	Memorial Stadium	5,000	
Clark Atlanta University	Clark Atlanta	Panthers	Atlanta	Georgia	1980	SIAC	Panther Stadium	6,000	
Colorado Mesa University	Colorado Mesa	Mavericks	Grand Junction	Colorado	1990 (Note: Colorado Mesa, known then as Mesa State, was previously a Division II member between 1982 and 1983.)	RMAC	Ralph Stocker Stadium	8,000	
Colorado School of Mines	Colorado Mines	Orediggers	Golden	Colorado	1974	RMAC	Harry D. Campbell Field	4,000	
Colorado State University Pueblo	CSU Pueblo	ThunderWolves	Pueblo	Colorado	2008 (Note: CSU Pueblo, known then as Southern Colorado, was previously a Division II member between 1974 and 1984.)	RMAC	Neta and Eddie DeRose ThunderBowl	6,500	
Commonwealth University-Bloomsburg	Bloomsburg	Huskies	Bloomsburg	Pennsylvania	1980	PSAC	Robert B. Redman Stadium	4,775	
Commonwealth University-Lock Haven	Lock Haven	Bald Eagles	Lock Haven	Pennsylvania	1980	PSAC	Hubert Jack Stadium	3,500	
Concord University	Concord	Mountain Lions	Athens	West Virginia	1993	MEC	Callaghan Stadium	5,000	
Concordia University, Saint Paul	Concordia (Note: Also known as Concordia-St. Paul.)	Golden Bears	St. Paul	Minnesota	2002	NSIC	Sea Foam Stadium	3,500	
Davenport University	Davenport	Panthers	Grand Rapids	Michigan	2017	GLIAC	Meyering Field	2,300	
Delta State University	Delta State	Statesmen	Cleveland	Mississippi	1973	GSC	Parker Field at McCool Stadium	8,000	
East Central University	East Central	Tigers	Ada	Oklahoma	1998	GAC	Norris Field	5,000	
East Stroudsburg University	East Stroudsburg	Warriors	East Stroudsburg	Pennsylvania	1973	PSAC	Eiler-Martin Stadium	6,000	
Eastern New Mexico University	Eastern New Mexico	Greyhounds	Portales	New Mexico	1985	LSC	Greyhound Stadium	5,200	
PennWest Edinboro (Note: Institutional name changed from Edinboro University of Pennsylvania in July 2022. The athletic program continues to be known as Edinboro.)	Edinboro	Fighting Scots	Edinboro	Pennsylvania	1973	PSAC	Sox Harrison Stadium	6,000	
Edward Waters University	Edward Waters	Tigers	Jacksonville	Florida	2021	SIAC	Community Field and Athletic Stadium	3,000	
Elizabeth City State University	Elizabeth City State	Vikings	Elizabeth City	North Carolina	1973	CIAA	Roebuck Stadium	6,500	
Emory and Henry University	Emory & Henry	Wasps	Emory	Virginia	2021	SAC	Fred Selfe Stadium at Nicewonder Field	5,500	
Emporia State University	Emporia State	Hornets	Emporia	Kansas	1990	MIAA	Francis G. Welch Stadium	7,000	
Erskine College	Erskine	Flying Fleet	Due West	South Carolina	2021	Carolinas	J. W. Babb Stadium	4,000	
Fairmont State University	Fairmont State	Fighting Falcons	Fairmont	West Virginia	1993 (Note: Fairmont State was previously a Division II member between 1978 and 1979.)	MEC	Duvall-Rosier Field	5,000	
Fayetteville State University	Fayetteville State	Broncos	Fayetteville	North Carolina	1973	CIAA	Luther "Nick" Jeralds Stadium	5,520	
Ferris State University	Ferris State	Bulldogs	Big Rapids	Michigan	1977	GLIAC	Top Taggart Field	6,200	
Ferrum College	Ferrum	Panthers	Ferrum	Virginia	2025	Carolinas	W. B. Adams Stadium	5,500	(Note: Transitioning from Division III.)
University of Findlay	Findlay	Oilers	Findlay	Ohio	2000	G-MAC	Donnell Stadium	7,500	
Fort Hays State University	Fort Hays State	Tigers	Hays	Kansas	1988	MIAA	Lewis Field Stadium	6,100	
Fort Lewis College	Fort Lewis	Skyhawks	Durango	Colorado	1990 (Note: Fort Lewis was previously a Division II member between 1973 and 1984.)	RMAC	Ray Dennison Memorial Field	4,000	
Fort Valley State University	Fort Valley State	Wildcats	Fort Valley	Georgia	1981	SIAC	Wildcat Stadium	10,000	
Franklin Pierce University	Franklin Pierce	Ravens	Rindge	New Hampshire	2019	NE-10	Sodexo Field	1,000	
Frostburg State University	Frostburg State	Bobcats	Frostburg	Maryland	2019	MEC	Bobcat Stadium	4,000	
Gannon University	Gannon	Golden Knights	Erie	Pennsylvania	1993	PSAC	Gannon Field	2,500	
Glenville State University	Glenville State	Pioneers	Glenville	West Virginia	1993	MEC	Morris Stadium	5,500	
Grand Valley State University	Grand Valley State	Lakers	Allendale	Michigan	1976	GLIAC	Lubbers Stadium	10,700	
Harding University	Harding	Bisons	Searcy	Arkansas	1997	GAC	First Security Stadium	6,500	
Henderson State University	Henderson State	Reddies	Arkadelphia	Arkansas	1992	GAC	Carpenter-Haygood Stadium at Ruggles Field	9,600	
Hillsdale College	Hillsdale	Chargers	Hillsdale	Michigan	1984 (Note: Hillsdale was previously a Division II member between 1976 and 1978.)	G-MAC	Frank "Muddy" Waters Stadium	8,500	
Indiana University of Pennsylvania	IUP	Crimson Hawks	Indiana	Pennsylvania	1973	PSAC	Frank Cignetti Field at George P. Miller Stadium	6,000	
University of Indianapolis	Indianapolis (Note: Also known as UIndy.)	Greyhounds	Indianapolis	Indiana	1976	GLVC	Key Stadium	5,500	(Note: Joining the GMAC in 2027.)
University of Jamestown	Jamestown	Jimmies	Jamestown	North Dakota	2025 (Note: Jamestown was previously a Division II member from 1982 to 1983.)	NSIC	Rollie Greeno Field		
Johnson C. Smith University	Johnson C. Smith	Golden Bulls	Charlotte	North Carolina	1973	CIAA	Irwin Belk Complex	4,500	
Kentucky State University	Kentucky State	Thorobreds	Frankfort	Kentucky	1973	SIAC	Alumni Field	5,000	
Kentucky Wesleyan College	Kentucky Wesleyan	Panthers	Owensboro	Kentucky	1993	G-MAC	Steele Stadium	3,000	
Kutztown University	Kutztown	Golden Bears	Kutztown	Pennsylvania	1980	PSAC	University Field at Andre Reed Stadium	5,600	
Lake Erie College	Lake Erie	Storm	Painesville	Ohio	2010	G-MAC	Jack Britt Memorial Stadium	2,500	
Lane College	Lane	Dragons	Jackson	Tennessee	1993	SIAC	Rothrock Stadium	3,500	
Lenoir-Rhyne University	Lenoir–Rhyne	Bears	Hickory	North Carolina	1989	SAC	Moretz Stadium	8,500	
Lincoln University	Lincoln (MO)	Blue Tigers	Jefferson City	Missouri	2001	GLVC	Dwight T. Reed Stadium	3,000	
Lincoln University	Lincoln (PA)	Lions	Lower Oxford	Pennsylvania	2011	CIAA	Lincoln Stadium	2,600	
Livingstone College	Livingstone	Blue Bears	Salisbury	North Carolina	1973	CIAA	Alumni Memorial Stadium	5,500	
Mars Hill University	Mars Hill	Lions	Mars Hill	North Carolina	1991	SAC	Meares Stadium	5,000	
University of Mary	Mary (Note: Also known as UMary.)	Marauders	Bismarck	North Dakota	2007	NSIC	MDU Resources Community Bowl	6,000	
McKendree University	McKendree	Bearcats	Lebanon	Illinois	2012	GLVC	Leemon Stadium	2,000	
Michigan Technological University	Michigan Tech	Huskies	Houghton	Michigan	1973	GLIAC	Sherman Field	3,000	
Midwestern State University	Midwestern State	Mustangs	Wichita Falls	Texas	1997	LSC	Memorial Stadium	14,500	
Miles College	Miles	Golden Bears	Fairfield	Alabama	1988	SIAC	Albert J. Sloan-Alumni Stadium	8,500	
Millersville University	Millersville	Marauders	Millersville	Pennsylvania	1980	PSAC	Biemesderfer Stadium	6,500	
University of Minnesota Duluth	Minnesota Duluth	Bulldogs	Duluth	Minnesota	1973	NSIC	Griggs Field at James S. Malosky Stadium	4,000	
Minnesota State University, Mankato	Minnesota State	Mavericks	Mankato	Minnesota	1978 (Note: Minnesota State, then known as Mankato State, was previously a Division II member between 1973 and 1976.)	NSIC	Blakeslee Stadium	7,500	
Minnesota State University Moorhead	Minnesota State–Moorhead	Dragons	Moorhead	Minnesota	1993 (Note: Moorhead State was previously a Division II member between 1973 and 1982.)	NSIC	Alex Nemzek Stadium	5,000	
Minot State University	Minot State	Beavers	Minot	North Dakota	2011	NSIC	Herb Parker Stadium	4,500	
Missouri University of Science and Technology	Missouri S&T	Miners	Rolla	Missouri	1973	GLVC	Allgood-Bailey Stadium	8,000	
Missouri Southern State University	Missouri Southern	Lions	Joplin	Missouri	1988	MIAA	Fred G. Hughes Stadium	7,000	
Missouri Western State University	Missouri Western	Griffons	St. Joseph	Missouri	1988	MIAA	Spratt Stadium	7,500	
Morehouse College	Morehouse	Maroon Tigers	Atlanta	Georgia	1981	SIAC	B. T. Harvey Stadium	9,850	
University of Nebraska at Kearney	Nebraska–Kearney (Note: Also known as UNK.)	Lopers	Kearney	Nebraska	1988	MIAA	Ron & Carol Cope Stadium	6,000	
New Mexico Highlands University	New Mexico Highlands	Cowboys	Las Vegas	New Mexico	1991 (Note: New Mexico Highlands was previously a Division II member between 1982 and 1984.)	RMAC	Perkins Stadium	5,000	
Newberry College	Newberry	Wolves	Newberry	South Carolina	1990	SAC	Setzler Field	4,000	
University of North Carolina at Pembroke	UNC Pembroke	Braves	Pembroke	North Carolina	2007	Carolinas	Grace P. Johnson Stadium	2,500	
North Greenville University	North Greenville	Trailblazers	Tigerville	South Carolina	2003	Carolinas	Younts Stadium	5,000	
Northeastern State University	Northeastern State	RiverHawks	Tahlequah	Oklahoma	1998	Independent	Doc Wadley Stadium	8,300	(Note: Northeastern State - Independent / Primary: MIAA.)
Northern Michigan University	Northern Michigan	Wildcats	Marquette	Michigan	1973	GLIAC	Superior Dome	8,000	
Northern State University	Northern State	Wolves	Aberdeen	South Dakota	1993 (Note: Northern State was previously a Division II member between 1980 and 1981.)	NSIC	Golden Eagle Field	6,000	
Northwest Missouri State University	Northwest Missouri State	Bearcats	Maryville	Missouri	1973	MIAA	Bearcat Stadium	6,500	
Northwestern Oklahoma State University	Northwestern Oklahoma State	Rangers	Alva	Oklahoma	2012	GAC	Ranger Field	6,000	
Northwood University	Northwood	Timberwolves	Midland	Michigan	1992 (Note: Northwood was previously a Division II member between 1981 and 1987.)	G-MAC	Hantz Stadium	3,000	
Ohio Dominican University	Ohio Dominican	Panthers	Columbus	Ohio	2011	G-MAC	Panther Field	1,750	
Oklahoma Baptist University	Oklahoma Baptist	Bison	Shawnee	Oklahoma	2015	GAC	Crain Family Stadium	2,500	
Ouachita Baptist University	Ouachita Baptist	Tigers	Arkadelphia	Arkansas	1997	GAC	Cliff Harris Stadium	5,225	
Pace University	Pace	Setters	Pleasantville	New York	1993	NE-10	Pace Field	1,500	
Pittsburg State University	Pittsburg State	Gorillas	Pittsburg	Kansas	1988	MIAA	Carnie Smith Stadium	8,344	
Post University	Post	Eagles	Waterbury	Connecticut	2022	NE-10	Municipal Stadium	6,000	(Note: Post - NE-10 affiliate member / Primary: Central Atlantic Collegiate Conference.)
Quincy University	Quincy	Hawks	Quincy	Illinois	2012 (Note: Quincy was previously a Division II member between 1993 and 1994 and then again between 1996 and 2003.)	GLVC	Flinn Stadium	4,000	
Roosevelt University	Roosevelt	Lakers	Chicago	Illinois	2024	GLIAC	Morris Field		
Saginaw Valley State University	Saginaw Valley State	Cardinals	University Center	Michigan	1981	GLIAC	Wickes Memorial Stadium	6,800	
Saint Anselm College	Saint Anselm	Hawks	Goffstown	New Hampshire	1999	NE-10	Grappone Stadium	4,500	(Note: Transitioning to Division III in the 2027 season.)
Savannah State University	Savannah State	Tigers	Savannah	Georgia	2019 (Note: Savannah State was previously a Division II member between 1981 and 2000.)	SIAC	Theodore A. Wright Stadium	8,500	
Seton Hill University	Seton Hill	Griffins	Greensburg	Pennsylvania	2008	PSAC	Offutt Field	5,000	
Shaw University	Shaw	Bears	Raleigh	North Carolina	2003	CIAA	Durham County Stadium	8,500	
Shepherd University	Shepherd	Rams	Shepherdstown	West Virginia	1990	PSAC	Ram Stadium	5,000	
Shippensburg University	Shippensburg	Raiders	Shippensburg	Pennsylvania	1976	PSAC	Seth Grove Stadium	7,700	
Shorter University	Shorter	Hawks	Rome	Georgia	2012	Carolinas	Barron Stadium	6,500	
University of Sioux Falls	Sioux Falls	Cougars	Sioux Falls	South Dakota	2012	NSIC	Bob Young Field	5,400	
Slippery Rock University	Slippery Rock	The Rock (Note: Unofficial nickname.)	Slippery Rock	Pennsylvania	1979	PSAC	N. Kerr Thompson Stadium	10,000	
South Dakota School of Mines and Technology	South Dakota Mines	Hardrockers	Rapid City	South Dakota	2011	RMAC	Dunham Field at O'Harra Stadium	4,000	
Southeastern Oklahoma State University	Southeastern Oklahoma State	Savage Storm	Durant	Oklahoma	1998	GAC	Paul Laird Field	9,000	
Southern Arkansas University	Southern Arkansas	Muleriders	Magnolia	Arkansas	1997	GAC	Wilkins Stadium	6,000	
Southern Connecticut State University	Southern Connecticut	Owls	New Haven	Connecticut	1973	NE-10	Jess Dow Field	6,000	
Southern Nazarene University	Southern Nazarene	Crimson Storm	Bethany	Oklahoma	2012	GAC	SNU Stadium	2,500	
Southwest Baptist University	Southwest Baptist	Bearcats	Bolivar	Missouri	1986	GLVC	Plaster Stadium	2,500	
Southwest Minnesota State University	Southwest Minnesota State	Mustangs	Marshall	Minnesota	1993 (Note: Southwest Minnesota, known then as Southwest State, was previously a Division II member between 1978 and 1983.)	NSIC	Mattke Field at the Regional Events Center	3,500	
Southwestern Oklahoma State University	Southwestern Oklahoma State	Bulldogs	Weatherford	Oklahoma	1998	GAC	ASAP Energy Field at Milam Stadium	8,600	
Sul Ross State University	Sul Ross State	Lobos	Alpine	Texas	2024	LSC	Jackson Field	4,000	
Texas A&M University–Kingsville	Texas A&M–Kingsville	Javelinas	Kingsville	Texas	1980	LSC	Javelina Stadium	15,000	
Thomas More University	Thomas More	Saints	Crestview Hills	Kentucky	2023	G-MAC	Republic Bank Field		
Tiffin University	Tiffin	Dragons	Tiffin	Ohio	2002	G-MAC	Frost-Kalnow Stadium	4,500	
Truman State University	Truman (Note: It may also be known as Truman State.)	Bulldogs	Kirksville	Missouri	1973	GLVC	Stokes Stadium	4,000	
Tusculum University	Tusculum	Pioneers	Tusculum	Tennessee	1998	SAC	Pioneer Field	3,500	
Tuskegee University	Tuskegee	Golden Tigers	Tuskegee	Alabama	1973	SIAC	Abbott Memorial Alumni Stadium	10,000	
Upper Iowa University	Upper Iowa	Peacocks	Fayette	Iowa	2005	GLVC	Eischeid Stadium	3,500	
University of Texas Permian Basin	UT Permian Basin (Note: Also known as Texas–Permian Basin and UTPB.)	Falcons	Odessa	Texas	2016	LSC	Ratliff Stadium	17,931	
University of Virginia's College at Wise	UVA Wise	Cavaliers	Wise	Virginia	2013	SAC	Carl Smith Stadium	3,100	
Valdosta State University	Valdosta State	Blazers	Valdosta	Georgia	1982	GSC	Bazemore-Hyder Stadium	11,211	
Virginia State University	Virginia State	Trojans	Ettrick	Virginia	1973	CIAA	Rogers Stadium	7,909	
Virginia Union University	Virginia Union	Panthers	Richmond	Virginia	1973	CIAA	Hovey Field	10,000	
Walsh University	Walsh	Cavaliers	Canton	Ohio	2012	G-MAC	Larry Staudt Field		
Washburn University	Washburn	Ichabods	Topeka	Kansas	1988	MIAA	Yager Stadium at Moore Bowl	7,250	
Wayne State University	Wayne State (MI)	Warriors	Detroit	Michigan	1973	GLIAC	Tom Adams Field	6,000	
Wayne State College	Wayne State (NE)	Wildcats	Wayne	Nebraska	1988	NSIC	Memorial Stadium	3,500	
University of West Alabama	West Alabama	Tigers	Livingston	Alabama	1974	GSC	Tiger Stadium	7,000	
West Chester University	West Chester	Golden Rams	West Chester	Pennsylvania	1973	PSAC	John A. Farrell Stadium	7,500	
West Liberty University	West Liberty	Hilltoppers	West Liberty	West Virginia	1991	MEC	West Family Stadium	3,200	
West Texas A&M University	West Texas A&M	Buffaloes	Canyon	Texas	1992 (Note: West Texas A&M, then known as West Texas State, was previously a Division II member between 1986 and 1990.)	LSC	Bain-Schaeffer Buffalo Stadium	8,500	
West Virginia State University	West Virginia State	Yellow Jackets	Institute	West Virginia	1997	MEC	Lakin Field	5,000	
West Virginia Wesleyan College	West Virginia Wesleyan	Bobcats	Buckhannon	West Virginia	1993 (Note: West Virginia Wesleyan was previously a Division II member between 1973 and 1980.)	MEC	Cebe Ross Field	3,000	
Western Colorado University	Western Colorado	Mountaineers	Gunnison	Colorado	1990 (Note: Western Colorado, then known as Western State, was previously a Division II member between 1973 and 1978 and then again between 1982 and 1985.)	RMAC	Mountaineer Bowl	4,000	
Western New Mexico University	Western New Mexico	Mustangs	Silver City	New Mexico	1994 (Note: Western New Mexico was previously a Division II member in 1983.)	LSC	Ben Altamirano Memorial Stadium	3,000	
Western Oregon University	Western Oregon	Wolves	Monmouth	Oregon	2001	LSC	McArthur Field	2,500	(Note: Western Oregon - LSC affiliate member / Primary: Great Northwest Athletic Conference.)
Wheeling University	Wheeling	Cardinals	Wheeling	West Virginia	2019	MEC	Bishop Schmitt Field	2,200	
William Jewell College	William Jewell	Cardinals	Liberty	Missouri	2012	GLVC	Greene Stadium	7,000	
Wingate University	Wingate	Bulldogs	Wingate	North Carolina	1991	SAC	Irwin Belk Stadium	3,000	
Winona State University	Winona State	Warriors	Winona	Minnesota	1978	NSIC	Maxwell Field at Warrior Stadium	3,500	
Winston-Salem State University	Winston-Salem State	Rams	Winston-Salem	North Carolina	2010 (Note: Winston-Salem State was previously a Division II member between 1973 and 2005.)	CIAA	Bowman Gray Stadium	22,000	

== Future Division II football programs ==
School	Nickname	City	State	Future conference	Stadium	Cap.	Note	Begins play
Lackawanna College	Falcons	Scranton	Pennsylvania	PSAC	Scranton Memorial Stadium	15,000	(Note: Transitioning from the NJCAA.)	2027
Monroe University	Mustangs	New Rochelle	New York	NE-10	The Stadium at Memorial Field	3,900	(Note: Monroe - NE-10 affiliate member / Primary: Central Atlantic Collegiate Conference.)	2027
Texas A&M University–Texarkana	Eagles	Texarkana	Texas	LSC	Red River Credit Union Stadium	—N/a	(Note: Transitioning from the NAIA.) (Note: The Eagles hope to play in their football stadium in 2028.)	2027
Shawnee State University	Bears	Portsmouth	Ohio	MEC	Spartan Municipal Stadium	8,500		2028
Texas Wesleyan University	Rams	Fort Worth	Texas	LSC	Karen Cramer Stadium	—N/a		2028

== Former Division II football programs ==
School names and nicknames reflect those last in use while each institution played D-II football. Name changes that do not reflect a complete change of identity (e.g., "College" to "University") are not included.

School	Nickname	City	State/ province	First Division II season	Last Division II season	Current level
Abilene Christian University	Wildcats	Abilene	Texas	1981	2012	Division I FCS
Alabama A&M University	Bulldogs	Normal	Alabama	1973	1998	Division I FCS
Alabama State University	Hornets	Montgomery	Alabama	1973	1981	Division I FCS
State University of New York at Albany	Great Danes	Albany	New York	1995	1998	Division I FCS
Alcorn State University	Braves	Lorman	Mississippi	1973	1976	Division I FCS
Alderson Broaddus University	Battlers	Philippi	West Virginia	2013	2022	University closed
University of Akron	Zips	Akron	Ohio	1973	1979	Division I FBS
University of Arkansas at Pine Bluff	Golden Lions	Pine Bluff	Arkansas	1973	1982	Division I FCS
Arkansas State University	Indians (Note: Nickname changed to Red Wolves in 2008.)	Jonesboro	Arkansas	1973	1974	Division I FBS
Austin Peay State University	Governors	Clarksville	Tennessee	1973	1979	Division I FCS
Azusa Pacific University	Cougars	Azusa	California	2012	2019	Division III (Note: Azusa Pacific dropped their football program in 2019 and remained a Division II non-football member until 2026. However, in 2026 they transitioned to NCAA Division III and reinstated football at D-III level.)
Ball State University	Cardinals	Muncie	Indiana	1973	1974	Division I FBS
Boise State University	Broncos	Boise	Idaho	1973	1977	Division I FBS
Boston University	Terriers	Boston	Massachusetts	1973	1977	Program dropped
Brevard College	Tornadoes	Brevard	North Carolina	2008	2016	Division III
Bryant University	Bulldogs	Smithfield	Rhode Island	1999	2008	Division I FCS
Bucknell University	Bison	Lewisburg	Pennsylvania	1973	1977	Division I FCS
Butler University	Bulldogs	Indianapolis	Indiana	1973	1992	Division I FCS
University of California, Davis	Aggies	Davis	California	1973	2004	Division I FCS
University of California, Riverside	Highlanders	Riverside	California	1973	1975	Program dropped
University of California, Santa Barbara	Gauchos	Santa Barbara	California	1991	1991	Program dropped
California Lutheran University	Kingsmen	Thousand Oaks	California	1985	1990	Division III
California Polytechnic State University	Mustangs	San Luis Obispo	California	1973	1993	Division I FCS
California State Polytechnic University, Pomona	Broncos	Pomona	California	1973	1982	Program dropped
California State University, Chico	Wildcats	Chico	California	1978	1996	Program dropped
California State University, Hayward (Note: California State University, East Bay since 2005.)	Pioneers	Hayward	California	1973	1993	Program dropped
California State University, Fullerton	Titans	Fullerton	California	1973	1974	Program dropped
California State University, Los Angeles	Golden Eagles	Los Angeles	California	1973	1977	Program dropped
California State University, Northridge	Matadors	Los Angeles	California	1973	1992	Program dropped
Cameron University	Aggies	Lawton	Oklahoma	1988	1992	Program dropped
University of Central Arkansas	Bears	Conway	Arkansas	1992	2005	Division I FCS
University of Central Florida (Note: Now athletically branded and academically marketed as UCF, although the legal name has not changed.)	Golden Knights (Note: Nickname changed to Knights in 2007.)	Orlando	Florida	1982	1989	Division I FBS
Central Michigan University	Chippewas	Mount Pleasant	Michigan	1973	1974	Division I FBS
Central Connecticut State University	Blue Devils	New Britain	Connecticut	1973	1992	Division I FCS
Cheyney University	Wolves	Cheyney	Pennsylvania	1973	2017	Program dropped
University of Connecticut (Note: Now athletically branded and academically marketed as UConn, although the legal name has not changed.)	Huskies	Storrs (Note: UConn's campus is in Storrs, and the Huskies played football on campus until their current home venue, Pratt & Whitney Stadium, opened in East Hartford in 2003.)	Connecticut	1973	1977	Division I FBS
Davidson College	Wildcats	Davidson	North Carolina	1977	1977	Division I FCS
University of Delaware	Fightin' Blue Hens	Newark	Delaware	1973	1979	Division I FBS
University of the District of Columbia	Firebirds	Washington	District of Columbia	1973	1975	Program dropped
Dixie State University (Note: Utah Tech University since July 1, 2022. The nickname of Trailblazers did not change.)	Trailblazers	St. George	Utah	2008	2019*	Division I FCS
East Tennessee State University	Buccaneers	Johnson City	Tennessee	1973	1977	Division I FCS
Eastern Illinois University	Panthers	Charleston	Illinois	1973	1980	Division I FCS
Eastern Kentucky University	Colonels	Richmond	Kentucky	1973	1977	Division I FCS
Eastern Michigan University	Hurons (Note: Nickname changed to Eagles in 1991.)	Ypsilanti	Michigan	1973	1975	Division I FBS
Eastern Washington University	Eagles	Cheney	Washington	1978	1983	Division I FCS
Elon University	Fighting Christians (Note: Nickname changed to Phoenix in 2000.)	Elon	North Carolina	1991	1998	Division I FCS
University of Evansville	Purple Aces	Evansville	Indiana	1978	1988	Program dropped
Florida A&M University	Rattlers	Tallahassee	Florida	1973	1977	Division I FCS
Florida Institute of Technology	Panthers	Melbourne	Florida	2013	2019	Program dropped
Franklin College	Grizzlies	Franklin	Indiana	1979	1985	Division III
Gardner-Webb University	Runnin' Bulldogs	Boiling Springs	North Carolina	1991	2001	Division I FCS
Grambling State University	Tigers	Grambling	Louisiana	1973	1976	Division I FCS
Georgetown College (Note: Usually referred to in print as "Georgetown (KY)" to distinguish from the Division I FCS Georgetown University in Washington, D.C.)	Tigers	Georgetown	Kentucky	1980	1982	NAIA
Hampton University	Pirates	Hampton	Virginia	1973	1994	Division I FCS
Hardin-Simmons University	Cowboys	Abilene	Texas	1993	1993	Division III
Howard Payne University	Yellow Jackets	Brownwood	Texas	1981	1986	Division III
Howard University	Bison	Washington	D.C.	1973	1977	Division I FCS
Humboldt State University (Note: California State Polytechnic University, Humboldt (Cal Poly Humboldt) since 2022.)	Lumberjacks	Arcata	California	1973	1973	Program dropped
Humboldt State University	Lumberjacks	Arcata	California	1980	2018	Program dropped
Idaho State University	Bengals	Pocatello	Idaho	1973	1977	Division I FCS
Illinois State University	Redbirds	Normal	Illinois	1973	1975	Division I FCS
University of the Incarnate Word	Cardinals	San Antonio	Texas	2009	2012	Division I FCS
Indiana State University	Sycamores	Terre Haute	Indiana	1973	1975	Division I FCS
Jackson State University	Tigers	Jackson	Mississippi	1973	1976	Division I FCS
Jacksonville State University	Gamecocks	Jacksonville	Alabama	1973	1994	Division I FBS
James Madison University	Dukes	Harrisonburg	Virginia	1974	1976	Division I FBS
Knoxville College	Bulldogs	Knoxville	Tennessee	1989	1989	Program dropped
Lafayette College	Leopards	Easton	Pennsylvania	1973	1977	Division I FCS
Lambuth University	Eagles	Jackson	Tennessee	2010	2010	University closed
Lehigh University	Engineers (Note: Nickname changed to Mountain Hawks in 1996.)	Bethlehem	Pennsylvania	1973	1977	Division I FCS
Liberty University	Flames	Lynchburg	Virginia	1981	1987	Division I FBS
Limestone University	Saints	Gaffney	South Carolina	2014	2024	University closed
Lindenwood University	Lions	St. Charles	Missouri	2011	2021	Division I FCS
C. W. Post Campus of Long Island University	Pioneers	Brookville	New York	1973	1973	Division I FCS (Note: As the LIU Sharks. Long Island University merged the Post athletic program with the Division I non-football program of its other main campus, LIU Brooklyn, in 2019 to create the current LIU Sharks.)
C. W. Post Campus of Long Island University	Pioneers	Brookville	New York	1978	1984	Division I FCS
C. W. Post Campus of Long Island University	Pioneers	Brookville	New York	1993	2018	Division I FCS
Louisiana Tech University	Bulldogs	Ruston	Louisiana	1973	1974	Division I FBS
University of Maine	Black Bears	Orono	Maine	1973	1977	Division I FCS
Malone University	Pioneers	Canton	Ohio	2013	2018	Program dropped
Commonwealth University-Mansfield	Mountaineers	Mansfield	Pennsylvania	1980	2006	Program dropped (Note: Mansfield currently plays sprint football, a variant played under standard college rules but with a strictly enforced player weight limit of 178 pounds (81 kg).)
University of Maryland Eastern Shore	Hawks	Princess Anne	Maryland	1973	1979	Program dropped
University of Massachusetts Amherst	Minutemen	Amherst	Massachusetts	1973	1977	Division I FBS
University of Massachusetts Lowell	River Hawks	Lowell	Massachusetts	1993	2003	Program dropped
McMurry University	War Hawks	Abilene	Texas	2012	2014	Division III
McNeese State University (Note: McNeese dropped the word "State" from its athletic branding in 2015. The university name has not changed.)	Cowboys	Lake Charles	Louisiana	1973	1974	Division I FCS
United States Merchant Marine Academy	Mariners	Kings Point	New York	1978	1981	Division III
Mercyhurst University	Lakers	Erie	Pennsylvania	1993	2023	Division I FCS
Merrimack College	Warriors	North Andover	Massachusetts	1996	2018	Division I FCS
Middle Tennessee State University (Note: Middle Tennessee no longer uses "State" in its athletic branding. The university name has not changed.)	Blue Raiders	Murfreesboro	Tennessee	1973	1977	Division I FBS
University of Minnesota Crookston	Golden Eagles	Crookston	Minnesota	2000	2019	Program dropped
University of Minnesota Morris	Cougars	Morris	Minnesota	1993	2004	Division III
Mississippi College (Note: Mississippi Christian University since 2026.)	Choctaws	Clinton	Mississippi	1973	1996	Program dropped
Mississippi College	Choctaws	Clinton	Mississippi	2014	2024	Program dropped
Mississippi Valley State University	Delta Devils	Itta Bena	Mississippi	1973	1979	Division I FCS
University of Montana	Grizzlies	Missoula	Montana	1973	1977	Division I FCS
Montana State University	Bobcats	Bozeman	Montana	1973	1977	Division I FCS
Morehead State University	Eagles	Morehead	Kentucky	1973	1977	Division I FCS
Morgan State University	Bears	Baltimore	Maryland	1973	1985	Division I FCS
Morningside University	Mustangs	Sioux City	Iowa	1973	2000	NAIA
Morris Brown College	Wolverines	Atlanta	Georgia	1973	2000	Program dropped
Murray State University	Racers	Murray	Kentucky	1973	1977	Division I FCS
University of Nebraska Omaha (Note: Now athletically branded as "Omaha", though the university's legal name has not changed.)	Mavericks	Omaha	Nebraska	1973	2010	Program dropped
University of Nevada, Las Vegas (UNLV)	Rebels	Las Vegas (Note: The UNLV campus is not within the City of Las Vegas, but is instead in the unincorporated community of Paradise.)	Nevada	1973	1977	Division I FBS
University of Nevada, Reno	Wolf Pack	Reno	Nevada	1973	1977	Division I FBS
University of New Hampshire	Wildcats	Durham	New Hampshire	1973	1977	Division I FCS
University of New Haven	Chargers	West Haven	Connecticut	1975	1976	Division I FCS
University of New Haven	Chargers	West Haven	Connecticut	1981	2003	Division I FCS
University of New Haven	Chargers	West Haven	Connecticut	2009	2024	Division I FCS
New York Institute of Technology	Bears	New York City	New York	1974	1983	Program dropped
Nicholls State University (Note: Nicholls dropped the word "State" from its athletic branding in 2017. The university name has not changed.)	Colonels	Thibodaux	Louisiana	1973	1979	Division I FCS
Norfolk State University	Spartans	Norfolk	Virginia	1973	1996	Division I FCS
University of North Alabama	Lions	Florence	Alabama	1973	2017	Division I FCS
North Carolina A&T State University	Aggies	Greensboro	North Carolina	1973	1977	Division I FCS
North Carolina Central University	Eagles	Durham	North Carolina	1973	2007	Division I FCS
University of North Dakota	Fighting Sioux (Note: Nickname changed to Fighting Hawks during the 2015 football season.)	Grand Forks	North Dakota	1973	2008	Division I FCS
North Dakota State University	Bison	Fargo	North Dakota	1973	2004	Division I FBS
Northeastern University	Huskies	Boston	Massachusetts	1973	1977	Program dropped
Northeast Louisiana University (Note: University of Louisiana at Monroe since 1999. Its preferred athletic brand is "ULM", but national media continue to use "Louisiana-Monroe".)	Indians (Note: Nickname changed to Warhawks in 2006.)	Monroe	Louisiana	1973	1974	Division I FBS
Northern Arizona University	Lumberjacks	Flagstaff	Arizona	1973	1977	Division I FCS
University of Northern Colorado	Bears	Greeley	Colorado	1973	2004	Division I FCS
University of Northern Iowa	Panthers	Cedar Falls	Iowa	1973	1980	Division I FCS
Northwestern State University	Demons	Natchitoches	Louisiana	1973	1975	Division I FCS
Notre Dame College	Falcons	South Euclid	Ohio	2010	2023	University closed
Oklahoma Panhandle State University	Aggies	Goodwell	Oklahoma	1999	2016	NAIA
Paine College	Lions	Augusta	Georgia	2014	2015	Program dropped
Portland State University	Vikings	Portland	Oregon	1973	1977	Division I FCS
Portland State University	Vikings	Portland	Oregon	1981	1997	Division I FCS
Prairie View A&M University	Panthers	Prairie View	Texas	1973	1979	Division I FCS
Presbyterian College	Blue Hose	Clinton	South Carolina	1991	2007	Division I FCS
University of Puget Sound	Loggers	Tacoma	Washington	1973	1988	Division III
University of Rhode Island	Rams	Kingston	Rhode Island	1973	1977	Division I FCS
California State University, Sacramento	Hornets	Sacramento	California	1973	1992	Division I FBS
Sacred Heart University	Pioneers	Fairfield	Connecticut	1993	1998	Division I FCS
Saint Augustine's University	Falcons	Raleigh	North Carolina	2003	2023	Program suspended
St. Cloud State University	Huskies	St. Cloud	Minnesota	1973	2019	Program dropped
University of St. Francis (IL)	Fighting Saints	Joliet	Illinois	1993	1998	NAIA
Saint Joseph's College	Pumas	Rensselaer	Indiana	1979	2016	Program dropped
Saint Mary's College of California	Gaels	Moraga	California	1981	1992	Program dropped
Saint Paul's College	Tigers	Lawrenceville	Virginia	1973	1986	University closed
Saint Paul's College	Tigers	Lawrenceville	Virginia	2005	2011	University closed
Sam Houston State University (Note: Sam Houston dropped the word "State" from its athletic branding in 2020. The university name has not changed.)	Bearkats	Huntsville	Texas	1981	1985	Division I FBS
San Francisco State University	Gators	San Francisco	California	1979	1994	Program dropped
Santa Clara University	Broncos	Santa Clara	California	1973	1992	Program dropped
Simon Fraser University	Red Leafs	Burnaby	British Columbia	2010	2022	Program dropped
Sonoma State University	Cossacks	Rohnert Park	California	1984	1997	Program dropped
South Carolina State University	Bulldogs	Orangeburg	South Carolina	1973	1977	Division I FCS
University of South Dakota	Coyotes	Vermillion	South Dakota	1973	2008	Division I FCS
South Dakota State University	Jackrabbits	Brookings	South Dakota	1973	2004	Division I FCS
Southeast Missouri State University (Note: The university uses "Southeast Missouri" and "SEMO" interchangeably in its athletic branding. National media continue to use "Southeast Missouri State".)	Redhawks	Cape Girardeau	Missouri	1973	1990	Division I FCS
Southeastern Louisiana University	Lions	Hammond	Louisiana	1973	1979	Division I FCS
Southern University	Jaguars	Baton Rouge	Louisiana	1973	1976	Division I FCS
Southern Oregon University	Raiders	Ashland	Oregon	1981	1983	NAIA
Southern Utah University	Thunderbirds	Cedar City	Utah	1982	1992	Division I FCS
Southwest Missouri State University (Note: Missouri State University since 2005.)	Bears	Springfield	Missouri	1973	1979	Division I FBS
Springfield College	Pride	Springfield	Massachusetts	1973	1994	Division III
Southwest Texas State University (Note: Texas State University since 2013.)	Bobcats	San Marcos	Texas	1978	1983	Division I FBS
Stephen F. Austin State University	Lumberjacks	Nacogdoches	Texas	1981	1985	Division I FCS
Stillman College	Tigers	Tuscaloosa	Alabama	2005	2015	Program dropped
Stonehill College	Skyhawks	Easton	Massachusetts	1993	2021	Division I FCS
State University of New York at Stony Brook	Seawolves	Stony Brook	New York	1995	1998	Division I FCS
Tarleton State University	Texans	Stephenville	Texas	1994	2019	Division I FCS
University of Tennessee at Chattanooga (Note: Now athletically branded as "Chattanooga", though the legal name has not changed.)	Mocs	Chattanooga	Tennessee	1973	1976	Division I FCS
University of Tennessee at Martin	Pacers (Note: Nickname changed to Skyhawks in 1995.)	Martin	Tennessee	1973	1991	Division I FCS
Tennessee State University	Tigers	Nashville	Tennessee	1973	1976	Division I FCS
Tennessee Technological University	Golden Eagles	Cookeville	Tennessee	1973	1977	Division I FCS
Texas A&M University-Commerce (Note: East Texas A&M University since 2024.)	Lions	Commerce	Texas	1981	2021	Division I FCS
Texas Lutheran University	Bulldogs	Seguin	Texas	1988	1988	Division III
Texas Lutheran University	Bulldogs	Seguin	Texas	1998	2002	Division III
Texas Southern University	Tigers	Houston	Texas	1973	1976	Division I FCS
Towson State University (Note: Towson University since 1997.)	Tigers	Towson	Maryland	1980	1986	Division I FCS
Troy State University (Note: Troy University since 2004.)	Trojans	Troy	Alabama	1973	1992	Division I FBS
Urbana University	Blue Knights	Urbana	Ohio	2009	2019	University closed
Valparaiso University	Crusaders (Note: Nickname changed to Beacons in 2021.)	Valparaiso	Indiana	1979	1992	Division I FCS
University of Vermont	Catamounts	Burlington	Vermont	1973	1974	Program dropped
Weber State University	Wildcats	Ogden	Utah	1973	1977	Division I FCS
West Virginia University Institute of Technology	Golden Bears	Montgomery (Note: WVU Tech relocated its campus to Beckley in 2016.)	West Virginia	1993	2005	Program dropped
Western Carolina University	Catamounts	Cullowhee	North Carolina	1973	1976	Division I FCS
University of West Florida	Argonauts	Pensacola	Florida	2016	2025	Division I FCS
University of West Georgia	Wolves	Carrollton	Georgia	1983	2023	Division I FCS
Western Illinois University	Leathernecks	Macomb	Illinois	1973	1980	Division I FCS
Western Kentucky University	Hilltoppers	Bowling Green	Kentucky	1973	1977	Division I FBS
Western Washington University	Vikings	Bellingham	Washington	1998	2008	Program dropped
Westminster College (Pennsylvania)	Titans	New Wilmington	Pennsylvania	1998	2002	Division III
University of Wisconsin-La Crosse	Eagles	La Crosse	Wisconsin	1975	1975	Division III
University of Wisconsin-Milwaukee (Note: The athletic program is now branded as "Milwaukee", though the university's legal name has not changed.)	Panthers	Milwaukee	Wisconsin	1973	1974	Program dropped
University of Wisconsin-Oshkosh	Titans	Oshkosh	Wisconsin	1973	1974	Division III
Wofford College	Terriers	Spartanburg	South Carolina	1988	1994	Division I FCS
Youngstown State University	Penguins	Youngstown	Ohio	1973	1980	Division I FCS

== See also ==
- NCAA Division II Football Championship
- List of NCAA Division II Football Championship appearances by team
- List of NCAA Division II institutions
- List of NCAA Division II baseball programs
- List of NCAA Division II lacrosse programs
- List of NCAA Division II men's soccer programs
- List of NCAA Division II men's wrestling programs
- List of NCAA Division II men's basketball programs
- List of NCAA Division I FBS football programs
- List of NCAA Division I FCS football programs
- List of NCAA Division III football programs
- List of NAIA football programs
- List of community college football programs
- List of colleges and universities with club football teams
- List of defunct college football teams
- Collegiate Sprint Football League
