= List of NAIA football programs =

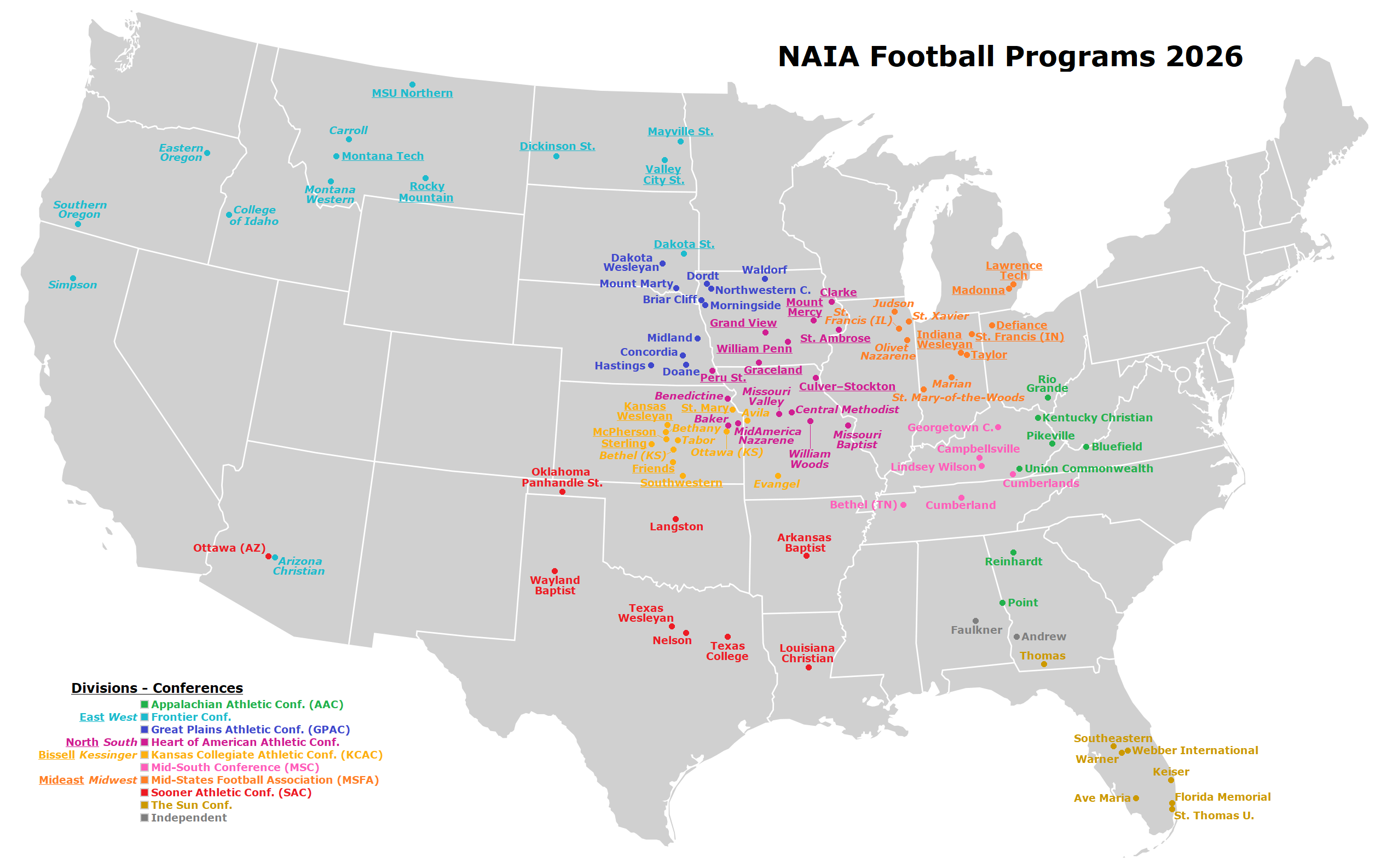
Map of NAIA football programs, 2026

This is a list of schools in the National Association of Intercollegiate Athletics (NAIA) that have football as a varsity sport. In the 2026 season, there are a total of 96 NAIA football programs.

== NAIA football programs ==
Institution	Nickname	City	State	Program Established	Conference for football	Primary conference
Andrew College	Fighting Tigers	Cuthbert	Georgia	2024	Independent (Appalachian Athletic Conference in 2027.)	Southern States Athletic Conference
Arizona Christian University	Firestorm	Phoenix	Arizona	2014	Frontier Conference	Great Southwest Athletic Conference
Arkansas Baptist College	Buffaloes	Little Rock	Arkansas	2007	Sooner Athletic Conference	Continental Athletic Conference
Ave Maria University	Gyrenes	Naples	Florida	2011	The Sun Conference	
Avila University	Eagles	Kansas City	Missouri	1999	Kansas Collegiate Athletic Conference	
Baker University	Wildcats	Baldwin City	Kansas	1890	Heart of America Athletic Conference	
Benedictine College	Ravens	Atchison	Kansas	1902	Heart of America Athletic Conference	
Bethany College	Terrible Swedes	Lindsborg	Kansas	1893	Kansas Collegiate Athletic Conference	
Bethel University	Wildcats	McKenzie	Tennessee	1900	Mid-South Conference	
Bethel College	Threshers	Newton	Kansas	1914	Kansas Collegiate Athletic Conference	
Bluefield University	Rams	Bluefield	Virginia	1941; 2012	Appalachian Athletic Conference	
Briar Cliff University	Chargers	Sioux City	Iowa	2003	Great Plains Athletic Conference	
Campbellsville University	Tigers	Campbellsville	Kentucky	1988	Mid-South Conference	
Carroll College	Fighting Saints	Helena	Montana	1920	Frontier Conference	
Central Methodist University	Eagles	Fayette	Missouri	1896	Heart of America Athletic Conference	
Clarke University	Pride	Dubuque	Iowa	2019	Heart of America Athletic Conference	
Concordia University-Nebraska	Bulldogs	Seward	Nebraska	2000	Great Plains Athletic Conference	
Culver–Stockton College	Wildcats	Canton	Missouri	N/A	Heart of America Athletic Conference	
Cumberland University	Phoenix	Lebanon	Tennessee	1894	Mid-South Conference	
University of the Cumberlands	Patriots	Williamsburg	Kentucky	1985	Mid-South Conference	
Dakota State University	Trojans	Madison	South Dakota	2006	Frontier Conference	
Dakota Wesleyan University	Tigers	Mitchell	South Dakota	1897	Great Plains Athletic Conference	
Defiance College	Yellow Jackets	Defiance	Ohio	1903	Mid-States Football Association	Wolverine-Hoosier Athletic Conference
Dickinson State University	Blue Hawks	Dickinson	North Dakota	1925	Frontier Conference	
Doane University	Tigers	Crete	Nebraska	1891	Great Plains Athletic Conference	
Dordt University	Defenders	Sioux Center	Iowa	2008	Great Plains Athletic Conference	
Eastern Oregon University	Mountaineers	La Grande	Oregon	1929	Frontier Conference	Cascade Collegiate Conference
Evangel University	Valor	Springfield	Missouri	1977	Kansas Collegiate Athletic Conference	
Faulkner University	Eagles	Montgomery	Alabama	2007	Independent (Appalachian Athletic Conference in 2027.)	Southern States Athletic Conference
Florida Memorial University	Lions	Miami Gardens	Florida	1945; 2020	The Sun Conference	
Friends University	Falcons	Wichita	Kansas	N/A	Kansas Collegiate Athletic Conference	
Georgetown College	Tigers	Georgetown	Kentucky	1893	Mid-South Conference	
Graceland University	Yellowjackets	Lamoni	Iowa	1910	Heart of America Athletic Conference	
Grand View University	Vikings	Des Moines	Iowa	2008	Heart of America Athletic Conference	
Hastings College	Broncos	Hastings	Nebraska	1895	Great Plains Athletic Conference	
College of Idaho	Coyotes	Caldwell	Idaho	1905; 2014	Frontier Conference	Cascade Collegiate Conference
Indiana Wesleyan University	Wildcats	Marion	Indiana	2018	Mid-States Football Association	Crossroads League
Judson University	Eagles	Elgin	Illinois	2021	Mid-States Football Association	Chicagoland Collegiate Athletic Conference
Kansas Wesleyan University	Coyotes	Salina	Kansas	1893	Kansas Collegiate Athletic Conference	
Keiser University	Seahawks	West Palm Beach	Florida	2018	The Sun Conference	
Kentucky Christian University	Knights	Grayson	Kentucky	2008	Appalachian Athletic Conference	River States Conference
Langston University	Lions	Langston	Oklahoma	1922	Sooner Athletic Conference	
Lawrence Technological University	Blue Devils	Southfield	Michigan	1933; 2018	Mid-States Football Association	Wolverine-Hoosier Athletic Conference
Lindsey Wilson University	Blue Raiders	Columbia	Kentucky	2010	Mid-South Conference	
Louisiana Christian University	Wildcats	Pineville	Louisiana	1908; 2000	Sooner Athletic Conference	Red River Athletic Conference
Madonna University	Crusaders	Livonia	Michigan	2020	Mid-States Football Association	Wolverine-Hoosier Athletic Conference
Marian University	Knights	Indianapolis	Indiana	2007	Mid-States Football Association	Crossroads League
Mayville State University	Comets	Mayville	North Dakota	N/A	Frontier Conference	
McPherson College	Bulldogs	McPherson	Kansas	1917	Kansas Collegiate Athletic Conference	
MidAmerica Nazarene University	Pioneers	Olathe	Kansas	1979	Heart of America Athletic Conference	
Midland University	Warriors	Fremont	Nebraska	1895	Great Plains Athletic Conference	
Missouri Baptist University	Spartans	St. Louis	Missouri	2014	Heart of America Athletic Conference	
Missouri Valley University	Vikings	Marshall	Missouri	1892	Heart of America Athletic Conference	
Montana State University-Northern	Lights	Havre	Montana	1957	Frontier Conference	
Montana Technological University	Orediggers	Butte	Montana	1902	Frontier Conference	
University of Montana Western	Bulldogs	Dillon	Montana	N/A	Frontier Conference	
Morningside University	Mustangs	Sioux City	Iowa	1898	Great Plains Athletic Conference	
Mount Marty University	Lancers	Yankton	South Dakota	2021	Great Plains Athletic Conference	
Mount Mercy University	Mustangs	Cedar Rapids	Iowa	2026	Heart of America Athletic Conference	
Nelson University	Lions	Waxahachie	Texas	1996	Sooner Athletic Conference	
Northwestern College	Red Raiders	Orange City	Iowa	1950	Great Plains Athletic Conference	
Oklahoma Panhandle State University	Aggies	Goodwell	Oklahoma	N/A	Sooner Athletic Conference	
Olivet Nazarene University	Tigers	Bourbonnais	Illinois	1976	Mid-States Football Association	Chicagoland Collegiate Athletic Conference
Ottawa University	Braves	Ottawa	Kansas	1891	Kansas Collegiate Athletic Conference	
Ottawa University Arizona	Spirit	Surprise	Arizona	2018	Sooner Athletic Conference	Great Southwest Athletic Conference
Peru State College	Bobcats	Peru	Nebraska	1900	Heart of America Athletic Conference	
University of Pikeville	Bears	Pikeville	Kentucky	2001	Appalachian Athletic Conference	
Point University	Skyhawks	West Point	Georgia	2012	Appalachian Athletic Conference	
Reinhardt University	Eagles	Waleska	Georgia	2013	Appalachian Athletic Conference	
University of Rio Grande	RedStorm	Rio Grande	Ohio	2025	Appalachian Athletic Conference	River States Conference
Rocky Mountain College	Battlin' Bears	Billings	Montana	1931	Frontier Conference	
St. Ambrose University	Fighting Bees	Davenport	Iowa	1893; 1974	Heart of America Athletic Conference	
University of St. Francis (IL)	Fighting Saints	Joliet	Illinois	1986	Mid-States Football Association	Chicagoland Collegiate Athletic Conference
University of Saint Francis (IN)	Cougars	Fort Wayne	Indiana	1998	Mid-States Football Association	Crossroads League
University of Saint Mary	Spires	Leavenworth	Kansas	2000	Kansas Collegiate Athletic Conference	
Saint Mary-of-the-Woods College	Pomeroys	Saint Mary-of-the-Woods	Indiana	2022	Mid-States Football Association	River States Conference
Saint Thomas University	Bobcats	Miami Gardens	Florida	2019	The Sun Conference	
Saint Xavier University	Cougars	Chicago	Illinois	1993	Mid-States Football Association	Chicagoland Collegiate Athletic Conference
Simpson University	Red Hawks	Redding	California	2023	Frontier Conference	California Pacific Conference (Cascade Collegiate Conference in 2027.)
Southeastern University	Fire	Lakeland	Florida	2014	The Sun Conference	
Southern Oregon University	Raiders	Ashland	Oregon	1927	Frontier Conference	Cascade Collegiate Conference
Southwestern College	Moundbuilders	Winfield	Kansas	1903	Kansas Collegiate Athletic Conference	
Sterling College	Warriors	Sterling	Kansas	1893	Kansas Collegiate Athletic Conference	
Tabor College	Bluejays	Hillsboro	Kansas	N/A	Kansas Collegiate Athletic Conference	
Taylor University	Trojans	Upland	Indiana	N/A	Mid-States Football Association	Crossroads League
Texas College	Steers	Tyler	Texas	1922; 2004	Sooner Athletic Conference	Red River Athletic Conference
Texas Wesleyan University	Rams	Fort Worth	Texas	1933; 2017	Sooner Athletic Conference	
Thomas University	Night Hawks	Thomasville	Georgia	2022	The Sun Conference	Southern States Athletic Conference
Union Commonwealth University	Bulldogs	Barbourville	Kentucky	1905; 1922; 1984	Appalachian Athletic Conference	
Valley City State University	Vikings	Valley City	North Dakota	N/A	Frontier Conference	
Waldorf University	Warriors	Forest City	Iowa	1965	Great Plains Athletic Conference	
Warner University	Royals	Lake Wales	Florida	2013	The Sun Conference	
Wayland Baptist University	Pioneers	Plainview	Texas	2012	Sooner Athletic Conference	
Webber International University	Warriors	Babson Park	Florida	2003	The Sun Conference	
William Penn University	Statesmen	Oskaloosa	Iowa	1892	Heart of America Athletic Conference	
William Woods University	Owls	Fulton	Missouri	2024	Heart of America Athletic Conference	

== Future NAIA football programs ==
School	Nickname	City	State	Conference for football	Primary conference	Begins play
Bismarck State College	Mystics	Bismarck	North Dakota	Frontier Conference		2027
Calumet College of St. Joseph	Crimson Wave	Hammond	Indiana	Mid-States Football Association	Chicagoland Collegiate Athletic Conference	2027
Manchester University	Spartans	North Manchester	Indiana	TBA	Crossroads League	2027
Midway University	Eagles	Midway	Kentucky	Mid-States Football Association	River States Conference	2027
Our Lady of the Lake University	Saints	San Antonio	Texas	Sooner Athletic Conference	Red River Athletic Conference	2027
Stillman College	Tigers	Tuscaloosa	Alabama	TBA	HBCU Athletic Conference	2027
Wilberforce University	Bulldogs	Wilberforce	Ohio	TBA	HBCU Athletic Conference	2027

== See also ==
- List of NAIA institutions
- List of current NAIA football coaches
- NAIA football national championship
- List of NAIA national football championship series appearances by team
- List of NCAA Division I FBS football programs
- List of NCAA Division I FCS football programs
- List of NCAA Division II football programs
- List of NCAA Division III football programs
- List of community college football programs
- List of NCAA institutions with club football teams
- List of defunct college football teams
