= List of colleges and universities with club football teams =

This is a list of post-secondary colleges and universities that have club football teams. Operating independently of their colleges' athletics programs, these teams are typically administered, coached, and played by students. In addition to playing other club teams, they play against institution-supported football programs at the college, community college, and collegiate prep school level. The vast majority of such schools are members of the National Collegiate Athletic Association (NCAA). Several teams in the club football circuits are from colleges that belong to the National Junior College Athletic Association (NJCAA), the equivalent sanctioning body for two-year institutions; three club teams in Canada belong to The Atlantic Football League in the Maritime Provinces of Canada; and two others from two-year colleges in Ontario play in the Canadian Junior Football League.

== Current club football teams ==
=== NCAA members ===
- Boston University
- Central Connecticut State University
- Clarkson University
- Columbus State University
- Coppin State University
- Eastern Connecticut State University
- Eastern Michigan University
- University of Fort Lauderdale
- George Mason University
- Johnson & Wales University
- Longwood University
- Loyola University Chicago
- Michigan State University
- Middle Georgia State University
- Metropolitan State University of Denver
- Miami University of Ohio
- Oakland University
- Ohio State University
- Princeton University (launched 2016)
- Sacred Heart University
- Southern Illinois University - Edwardsville
- University of Florida
- University of Michigan-Flint
- University of North Carolina - Chapel Hill
- University of North Carolina - Greensboro
- University of Pittsburgh
- University of South Carolina
- University of Toledo
- University of Vermont
- University of Wisconsin - Milwaukee
- Wright State University

=== NJCAA members ===
- Onondaga Community College
- Housatonic Community College

=== Atlantic Football League members ===
- Dalhousie University
- University of New Brunswick Fredericton Campus
- University of New Brunswick Saint John Campus
- Holland College

=== CCAA members ===
- St. Clair College Windsor Campus
- Sault College

== Former club football teams ==
- Appalachian State University
- Chattahoochee Technical College
- Clemson University
- Cleveland State University
- Davidson College
- DePaul University
- Duke University
- Kennesaw State University
- King College
- Lake Erie College*
- Loyola Marymount University
- Manhattan College
- Marquette University
- University of New Orleans
- New York University
- Old Dominion University
- Orangeburg-Calhoun Technical College
- North Carolina State University
- Providence College
- Queens College, City University of New York
- Radford University
- Rollins College
- St. Bonaventure University
- St. Francis College
- Texas Tech University
- University of California, San Diego
- University of Maine
- University of Maryland Eastern Shore
- University of New Orleans
- University of Texas at Arlington
- University of Wisconsin–Parkside
- Virginia Commonwealth University
- Xavier University

== Former club football teams that upgraded to NCAA level ==
Active programs

- University at Albany
- Duquesne University
- Fordham University
- Gallaudet University
- Georgetown University
- Georgia Southern University
- Georgia State University
- Marist College
- Nicholls State University
- Post University
- University of San Diego
- University of South Alabama

Inactive programs

- Alderson Broaddus University
- Brooklyn College
- Fairfield University
- Iona College
- St. John's University
- St. Paul's College, Virginia
- Seton Hall University
- Siena College

== See also ==
- Collegiate club sports
- List of NCAA Division I institutions
- List of NCAA Division II institutions
- List of NCAA Division III institutions
- List of NCAA Division I FBS football programs
- List of NCAA Division I FCS football programs
- List of NCAA Division II football programs
- List of NCAA Division III football programs
- List of NAIA football programs
- List of community college football programs
- List of defunct college football teams
- National Club Football Association
- Yankee Conference#Modern club football conference
- Atlantic Football League
