= Queens Silver Knights football =

New York college football team (1972–1974)

Queens Silver Knights
- First season: 1972
- Last season: 1974
- Location: Flushing, Queens, New York City
- All-time record: 3–15–0 (.167)

Conference championships
- 0

Division championships
- 0

The Queens Silver Knights team was a college football representing Queens College, City University of New York, from 1972 to 1974.

== History ==
The team gained approval in 1970 to begin play, but could not because of lack of funding. A team was approved for 1971, but no games were played until 1972. The team was disbanded in 1974 because of "mismanagement" by the head coach, Tony Cruz.

== See also ==
- Queens Knights
