= List of defunct college football teams =

This is a list of universities in the United States that sponsored football at one time but have since discontinued their programs. The last season that the school fielded a football team is included.

Schools are split up based on their current athletics affiliation. The affiliation of the football team while it was active may have been different.

== NCAA Division I schools ==
School	Team	City	State	Type	Last year
American University	Eagles	Washington	DC	Private, Methodist	1941
University of Arkansas at Little Rock (Note: UALR, now branded athletically as Little Rock, fielded a football team when it was known as Little Rock Junior College.)	Trojans	Little Rock	AR	Public	1955
Boston University	Terriers	Boston	MA	Private, formerly Methodist	1997
Bradley University	Braves	Peoria	IL	Private, Independent	1970
California Baptist University	Lancers	Riverside	CA	Private	1955 (Note: It may be inexact.)
California State University, Fullerton	Titans	Fullerton	CA	Public	1992
California State University, Long Beach	49ers (Note: Long Beach State now officially brands its athletic program as "The Beach" (or "Long Beach State Beach"), but it did not fully adopt the new branding until 2020–21, long after the demise of football.)	Long Beach	CA	Public	1991
California State University, Northridge	Matadors	Northridge	CA	Public	2001
University of California, Riverside	Highlanders	Riverside	CA	Public	1975
University of California, San Diego	Tritons	La Jolla	CA	Public	1968 (Note: Under head coach Walt Hackett, UC San Diego football went 0–7 in its first and only season in 1968.)
University of California, Santa Barbara	Gauchos	Santa Barbara (Note: The campus has a Santa Barbara mailing address but is physically in the unincorporated community of Isla Vista.)	CA	Public	1991
Canisius University (Note: Was known as Canisius College when football was discontinued.)	Golden Griffins	Buffalo	NY	Private, Catholic (Jesuit)	2002
College of Charleston	Cougars	Charleston	SC	Public	1923
Creighton University	Bluejays	Omaha	NE	Private, Catholic (Jesuit)	1942
University of Denver	Pioneers	Denver	CO	Private, Methodist founding	1960
DePaul University	Blue Demons	Chicago	IL	Private, Catholic (Vincentian)	1938
University of Detroit Mercy (Note: In 1990, Detroit merged with Mercy College to form the University of Detroit Mercy. Despite the new institutional name, the athletic program did not adopt "Detroit Mercy" until 2017.)	Titans	Detroit	MI	Private, Catholic (Jesuit/Sisters of Mercy)	1964
Drexel University	Dragons	Philadelphia	PA	Private, non-sectarian	1973
University of Evansville	Purple Aces	Evansville	IN	Private, Methodist	1997
Fairfield University	Stags	Fairfield	CT	Private, Catholic (Jesuit)	2002
George Washington University	Colonials (Note: George Washington did not adopt its current nickname of "Revolutionaries" until 2023, long after the demise of football.)	Washington	DC	Private, non-sectarian	1966
Gonzaga University	Bulldogs	Spokane	WA	Private, Catholic (Jesuit)	1941
High Point University	Panthers	High Point	NC	Private, Methodist	1950
Hofstra University	Pride	Hempstead	NY	Private, non-sectarian	2009
University of Illinois Chicago (Note: From 1965–1982, UIC was known as University of Illinois at Chicago Circle. In September 1982, UICC merged with the University of Illinois at the Medical Center, and the consolidated university was renamed the University of Illinois Chicago.)	Chikas (Note: After its consolidation with the University of Illinois at the Medical Center in 1982, students from both UICC and the Medical Center voted to change the athletic nickname to Flames.)	Chicago	IL	Public	1973
Iona University (Note: Was known as Iona College when football was discontinued.)	Gaels	New Rochelle	NY	Private, Catholic (Christian Brothers)	2008
Jacksonville University	Dolphins	Jacksonville	FL	Private	2019
La Salle University	Explorers	Philadelphia	PA	Private, Catholic (Lasallian)	2007
Long Island University (Note: At the time this program was active, Long Island University consisted only of what is now the school's Brooklyn campus. LIU opened what is now known as the Post campus in 1951, and the two campuses maintained separate athletic programs until 2019. The Post campus added football in 1957, competing in the NCAA College Division; when the College Division was split into Division II and Division III in 1973, Post became part of Division II. It then spent more than a decade shuttling between Divisions II and III until aligning permanently with D-II in 1986. Post continued playing in D-II until LIU merged its two athletic programs in July 2019. Following the athletic merger, the Post football team became the new LIU football team, competing as the LIU Sharks.)	Blackbirds	Brooklyn	NY	Private, non-sectarian	1940
Loyola Marymount University (Note: Was known as Loyola University of Los Angeles (Loyola–Los Angeles) when playing football.)	Lions	Los Angeles	CA	Private, Catholic (Jesuit)	1951
Loyola University Chicago	Ramblers	Chicago	IL	Private, Catholic (Jesuit)	1930
Loyola University Maryland	Greyhounds	Baltimore	MD	Private, Catholic (Jesuit)	1933
Manhattan University	Jaspers	Riverdale	NY	Private, Catholic (Lasallian)	1942
Marquette University	Golden Avalanche (Note: Marquette used the "Golden Avalanche" nickname for football, though also used "Warriors" for other sports. After the demise of football, "Warriors" became the sole nickname until the current nickname of "Golden Eagles" was adopted in 1994.)	Milwaukee	WI	Private, Catholic (Jesuit)	1960
University of Maryland Eastern Shore (Note: Was known as Maryland State College until 1970.)	Hawks	Princess Anne (Note: The campus has a Princess Anne mailing address but is physically in unincorporated Somerset County.)	MD	Public	1979
University of Massachusetts Lowell	River Hawks	Lowell	MA	Public	2002
Mount Saint Mary's University	Mountaineers	Emmitsburg (Note: The campus has an Emmitsburg mailing address but is physically in unincorporated Frederick County.)	MD	Private, Catholic	1950
University of Nebraska Omaha	Mavericks	Omaha	NE	Public	2010
Niagara University	Purple Eagles	Lewiston (Note: The campus mailing address is "Niagara University".)	NY	Private, Catholic (Vincentian)	1950
University of North Carolina at Asheville (Note: UNCA was known as Asheville–Biltmore College when it last competed in football.)	Bulldogs	Asheville	NC	Public	1953
Northeastern University	Huskies	Boston	MA	Private, formerly Protestant (YMCA)	2009
University of the Pacific	Tigers	Stockton	CA	Private, formerly Methodist	1995
Pepperdine University	Waves	Malibu (Note: The campus has a Malibu mailing address but is physically in unincorporated Los Angeles County.)	CA	Private, Church of Christ	1961
University of Portland	Pilots	Portland	OR	Private, Catholic (Holy Cross)	1949
Providence College	Friars	Providence	RI	Private, Catholic (Dominican)	1941
Rider University	Roughriders	Lawrenceville	NJ	Private, non-sectarian	1951
St. Bonaventure University	Brown Indians	St. Bonaventure	NY	Private, Catholic (Franciscan)	1951
St. John's University	Red Storm	Queens	NY	Private, Catholic (Vincentian)	2002
Saint Joseph's University	Hawks	Philadelphia	PA	Private, Catholic (Jesuit)	1939
Saint Louis University	Billikens	St. Louis	MO	Private, Catholic (Jesuit)	1949
Saint Mary's College of California	Gaels	Moraga	CA	Private, Catholic (Christian Brothers)	2003
Saint Peter's University	Peacocks	Jersey City	NJ	Private, Catholic (Jesuit)	2006
University of San Francisco	Dons	San Francisco	CA	Private, Catholic (Jesuit)	1971
Santa Clara University	Broncos	Santa Clara	CA	Private, Catholic (Jesuit)	1992
Seton Hall University	Pirates	South Orange	NJ	Private, Catholic (diocesan)	1981
Siena University (Note: Was known as Siena College when football was dicontinued.)	Saints	Loudonville	NY	Private, Catholic (Franciscan)	2003
Texas A&M University–Corpus Christi (Note: Was known as University of Corpus Christi when football was discontinued.)	Tarpons	Corpus Christi	TX	Public	1965
University of Texas at Arlington	Mavericks	Arlington	TX	Public	1985
University of Vermont	Catamounts	Burlington	VT	Public	1974
Wichita State University	Shockers	Wichita	KS	Public	1986
University of Wisconsin–Milwaukee	Panthers	Milwaukee	WI	Public	1974
Xavier University	Musketeers	Cincinnati	OH	Private, Catholic (Jesuit)	1973

== NCAA Division II schools ==
School	Team	City	State	Type	Last year
Adelphi University	Panthers	Garden City	NY	Private, independent	1953
University of Alaska Fairbanks	Nanooks	Fairbanks	AK	Public (University of Alaska)	1952
University of Bridgeport	Purple Knights	Bridgeport	CT	Private, independent	1975
California State Polytechnic University, Humboldt (Note: Was known as Humboldt State University when the football program was discontinued in 2018.)	Lumberjacks	Arcata	CA	Public (California State University)	2018
California State Polytechnic University, Pomona	Broncos	Pomona	CA	Public (California State University)	1985
California State University, Chico	Wildcats	Chico	CA	Public (California State University)	1996
California State University, East Bay (Note: Was known as California State University, Hayward when the football program was discontinued.)	Pioneers	Hayward	CA	Public (California State University)	1993
California State University, Los Angeles	Diablos	Los Angeles	CA	Public (California State University)	1977
Cameron University	Aggies	Lawton	OK	Public (The University of Oklahoma system)	1992
Cedarville University	Yellow Jackets	Cedarville	OH	Private, Baptist	1953
Christian Brothers University	Buccaneers	Memphis	TN	Private, Catholic (Christian Brothers)	1922
Claflin University	Panthers	Orangeburg	SC	Private, Methodist (HBCU)	1965
Davis & Elkins College	Senators	Elkins	WV	Private, Presbyterian	1962
University of the District of Columbia	Firebirds	Washington	DC	Public (HBCU)	1990
Drury University	Panthers	Springfield	MO	Private, Disciples of Christ	1932
Florida Institute of Technology	Panthers	Melbourne	FL	Private, independent	2019 (Note: Eliminated in 2020 as a cost-saving measure during the COVID-19 pandemic.)
Florida Southern College	Moccasins	Lakeland	FL	Private, Methodist	1935
Lake Superior State University	Lakers	Sault Ste. Marie	MI	Public	1950
Lees–McRae College	Bobcats	Banner Elk	NC	Private, Presbyterian	1993
LeMoyne–Owen College	Magicians	Memphis	TN	Private, United Church of Christ (HBCU)	1950
Lewis University	Flyers	Romeoville	IL	Private, Catholic (Lasallian)	1956
Lincoln Memorial University	Railsplitters	Harrogate	TN	Private, independent	1931
Lubbock Christian University	Chaparrals	Lubbock	TX	Private, Churches of Christ	1982
Malone University	Pioneers	Canton	OH	Private, Quaker (Evangelical Friends Church - Eastern Region)	2018
Mansfield University of Pennsylvania	Mountaineers	Mansfield	PA	Public (PASSHE)	2006 (Note: Mansfield began play in sprint football in 2008.)
Menlo College	Oaks	Atherton	CA	Private, independent	2014
University of Minnesota Crookston	Golden Eagles	Crookston	MN	Public (University of Minnesota System)	2019
Mississippi Christian University (Note: Was known as Mississippi College when the football program was discontinued.)	Choctaws	Clinton	MS	Private university	2024
Montana State University Billings (Note: Was known as Eastern Montana College when the football program was discontinued.)	Yellowjackets	Billings	MT	Public (Montana University System)	1978
University of North Georgia (Note: Was known as North Georgia College when the football program was discontinued in 1931.)	Saints (Note: UNG athletics programs now known as the Nighthawks.)	Dahlonega	GA	Public (Military college; University System of Georgia)	1931
Northwood University	Timberwolves	Midland	MI	Private, Independent	1971
Regis University	Rangers	Denver	CO	Private, Catholic (Jesuit)	1942
Queens College, City University of New York	Silver Knights	Queens	NY	Public (City University of New York)	1974
Rollins College	Tars	Winter Park	FL	Private, originally Congregationalist	1949
St. Cloud State University	Huskies	St. Cloud	MN	Public (Minnesota State Colleges and Universities)	2019
Saint Leo University	Lions	Saint Leo	FL	Private, Catholic (Benedictine)	1980
St. Mary's University, Texas	Rattlers	San Antonio	TX	Private, Catholic (Marianist)	1941
Saint Martin's University	Rangers	Lacey	WA	Private, Catholic (Benedictine)	1951
Saint Michael's College	Purple Knights	Colchester	VT	Private, Catholic (Society of Saint Edmund)	1953
San Francisco State University	Gators	San Francisco	CA	Public (California State University)	1994
Simon Fraser University (Note: Despite the fact that Simon Fraser is a Canadian school, they are an NCAA Division II member. They are the only Canadian school member of the NCAA.)	Red Leafs	Burnaby	BC	Public (Canadian)	2022
Sonoma State University	Cossacks (Note: Sonoma State's athletic program now uses the nickname Seawolves.)	Rohnert Park	CA	Public (California State University)	1996
Spring Hill College	Badgers	Mobile	AL	Private, Catholic (Jesuit)	1941
University of Tampa	Spartans	Tampa	FL	Private, independent	1974
Thomas Jefferson University (Note: The athletic program is now known as Jefferson, reflecting the 2017 merger of Philadelphia University with Thomas Jefferson University.)	Rams	Philadelphia	PA	Private, independent	1900
Union University	Bulldogs	Jackson	TN	Private, Baptist (Tennessee Baptist Convention)	1952
Vanguard University (Note: Was known as Southern California College when the football program was discontinued in 1961.)	Lions	Costa Mesa	CA	Private, Assemblies of God	1961
Western Washington University	Vikings	Bellingham	WA	Public	2008
Westminster University (Note: Was known as Westminster College when the football program was discontinued in 1978.)	Parsons	Salt Lake City	UT	Private, originally Presbyterian	1978

== NCAA Division III schools ==
School	Team	City	State	Type	Last year
Aurora University	Spartans	Aurora	IL	Private, originally Advent Christian Church	1952
Arcadia University (Note: Was still known as Beaver College when the football program was discontinued in 1904.)	Knights	Glenside	PA	Private, Presbyterian	1904
Bard College	Raptors	Annandale-on-Hudson	NY	Private, Episcopal Church	1924
Blackburn College	Beavers	Carlinville	IL	Private, Presbyterian	2008
Brandeis University	Judges	Waltham	MA	Private, nonsectarian	1959
Brooklyn College	Bulldogs	Brooklyn	NY	Public (City University of New York)	1990
California Institute of Technology	Beavers	Pasadena	CA	Private, independent	1993
Clarkson University	Golden Knights	Potsdam	NY	Private, independent	1952
Colorado College	Tigers	Colorado Springs	CO	Private, originally Presbyterian	2008
Farmingdale State College (Note: Was known as State Institute of Applied Agriculture when the football program was discontinued.)	Rams	Farmingdale	NY	Public (State University of New York)	1937
Franciscan University of Steubenville (Note: Was still known as the College of Steubenville when the football program was discontinued in 1949.)	Barons	Steubenville	OH	Private, Catholic (Franciscan)	1949
Haverford College	Fords	Haverford	PA	Private, originally Quaker	1971
Keene State College	Owls	Keene	NH	Public (University System of New Hampshire)	1929
Maranatha Baptist University	Sabercats	Watertown	WI	Private, Baptist	2015
University of Massachusetts Boston	Beacons	Dorchester	MA	Public (UMass System)	2000
City College of New York	Beavers	New York City	NY	Public	1951
New York University	Violets	New York City	NY	Private, originally Presbyterian	1952
State University of New York at Fredonia	Blue Devils	Fredonia	NY	Public (State University of New York)	1916
State University of New York at Geneseo	Knights	Geneseo	NY	Public (State University of New York)	1913
State University of New York at New Paltz	Hawks	New Paltz	NY	Public (State University of New York)	1936
State University of New York at Oswego	Lakers	Oswego	NY	Public (State University of New York)	1976
State University of New York at Plattsburgh	Cardinals	Plattsburgh	NY	Public (State University of New York)	1978
State University of New York at Potsdam	Bears	Potsdam	NY	Public (State University of New York)	1903
Occidental College	Tigers	Los Angeles	CA	Private, originally Presbyterian	2019
Oglethorpe University	Stormy Petrels	Brookhaven	GA	Private, originally Presbyterian	1940
University of the Ozarks (Note: Was still known as the College of the Ozarks when the football program was discontinued in 1967.)	Eagles	Clarksville	AR	Private, Presbyterian	1967
Piedmont University (Note: Was still known as Piedmont College when the football program was discontinued.)	Lions	Demorest	GA	Private, United Church of Christ	1940
Principia College	Panthers	Elsah	IL	Private, Christian Science	2008
Ramapo College	Roadrunners	Mahwah	NJ	Public	1992
Rochester Institute of Technology	Tigers	Henrietta	NY	Private, Independent	1977
Roger Williams University	Hawks	Bristol	RI	Private, Independent	1987
Saint Mary's University of Minnesota	Cardinals	Winona	MN	Private, Catholic (Lasallian)	1954
University of Scranton	Royals	Scranton	PA	Private, Catholic (Jesuit)	1960
Stevens Institute of Technology	Ducks	Hoboken	NJ	Private, independent	1924
Swarthmore College	Garnet	Swarthmore	PA	Private, originally Quaker	2000
Transylvania University	Pioneers	Lexington	KY	Private, Disciples of Christ	1941
Washington College	Shoremen	Chestertown	MD	Private, independent	1950
Whitman College	Blues	Walla Walla	WA	Private, originally Congregationalist	1976
University of Wisconsin–Superior	Yellowjackets	Superior	WI	Public (University of Wisconsin System)	1992

== NAIA schools ==
School	Team	City	State	Type	Last year
Abraham Baldwin Agricultural College (Note: Was known as the Georgia State College for Men when its football program was discontinued in 1932.)	Golden Stallions	Tifton	GA	Public	1932
Aquinas College	Saints	Grand Rapids	MI	Private, Catholic (Dominican)	1951
Bacone College	Warriors	Muskogee	OK	Private, Indian (originally ABCUSA)	2017
Dillard University	Bleu Devils	New Orleans	LA	Private, Methodist/United Church of Christ (HBCU)	1965
Fisk University	Bulldogs	Nashville	TN	Private, originally United Church of Christ (HBCU)	1983
Haskell Indian Nations University	Fighting Indians	Lawrence	KS	Public, Indian	2014
Huntington University (Note: Was known as Huntington College when the football program was discontinued in 1949.)	Foresters	Huntington	IN	Private, Church of the United Brethren in Christ	1949
Jarvis Christian University (Note: Was known as Jarvis Christian College when the football program was discontinued in 1966.)	Bulldogs	Hawkins	TX	Private, Disciples of Christ (HBCU)	1966
Lewis–Clark State College (Note: Was known as Northern Idaho College of Education when the football program was discontinued in 1950.)	Warriors	Lewiston	ID	Public	1950
Loyola University New Orleans	Wolf Pack	New Orleans	LA	Private, Catholic (Jesuit)	1939
Milligan University (Note: Was known as Milligan College when the football program was discontinued in 1950.)	Buffaloes	Milligan College	TN	Private, Restoration Movement, originally Disciples of Christ	1950
Morris College	Hornets	Sumter	SC	Private, Baptist (HBCU)	1964
Oklahoma City University	Chiefs	Oklahoma City	OK	Private, Methodist	1950
Oregon Institute of Technology	Owls	Klamath Falls	OR	Public	1992
Paul Quinn College	Tigers	Dallas	TX	Private, Methodist (HBCU)	2006
Philander Smith University (Note: Was known as Philander Smith College when the football program was discontinued in 1964.)	Panthers	Little Rock	AR	Private, Methodist (HBCU)	1964
Rust College	Bearcats	Holly Springs	MS	Private, Methodist (HBCU)	1964
Stillman College	Tigers	Tuscaloosa	AL	Private, Presbyterian (HBCU)	2015
Talladega College	Tornadoes	Talladega	AL	Private, United Church of Christ (HBCU)	1940
Tennessee Wesleyan University (Note: Was known as Tennessee Wesleyan College when the football program was discontinued in 1993.)	Bulldogs	Athens	TN	Private, Methodist	1993
Tougaloo College	Bulldogs	Tougaloo	MS	Private, United Church of Christ/Disciples of Christ (HBCU)	1960
West Virginia University Institute of Technology	Golden Bears	Montgomery (Note: WVU Tech did not start its move to its current campus in Beckley until 2016. The athletic program did not move until the campus move was completed in 2017.)	WV	Public	2011
Wilberforce University	Bulldogs	Wilberforce	OH	Private, African Methodist Episcopal (HBCU)	1944
Wiley University (Note: Was known as Wiley College when the football program was discontinued in 1968.)	Wildcats	Marshall	TX	Private, Methodist (HBCU)	1968
William Carey University	Crusaders	Hattiesburg	MS	Private, Baptist	1955
Xavier University of Louisiana	Gold Rush	New Orleans	LA	Private, Catholic (Sisters of the Blessed Sacrament, HBCU)	1959
York University (Note: Was known as York College when the football program was discontinued in 1953.)	Panthers	York	NE	Private, Churches of Christ	1953

== USCAA schools ==
School	Team	City	State	Type	Last year
Andrews University (Note: Was known as Battle Creek College when its football program was discontinued in 1926.)	Cardinals	Berrien Springs	MI	Private, Seventh-Day Adventist	1926
Kean Jersey City (Note: Was known as New Jersey City University when football was discontinued.)	Gothic Knights	Jersey City	NJ	Public	2002
Webb Institute	Webbies	New York City	NY	Private, independent	1931

== NCCAA schools ==
School	Team	City	State	Last year
Paine College	Lions	Augusta	GA	2013
Simmons College of Kentucky (Note: Was known as Louisville Municipal College when its football program was discontinued in 1951.)	Falcons	Louisville	KY	1951
Trinity Bible College	Lions	Ellendale	ND	2019

== NJCAA schools ==
School	Team	City	State	Last year
Columbia Basin College	Hawks	Pasco	Washington	
Everett Community College	Trojans	Everett	Washington	
Gooding College	Bobcats	Gooding	Idaho	
Lassen Community College	Cougars	Susanville	California	
Northland Community Technical College	Pioneers	Thief River Falls	Minnesota	2019
Olympic College	Rangers	Bremerton	Washington	
Shoreline Community College	Dolphins	Shoreline	Washington	
South Georgia State College	Hawks	Douglas	GA	1940
Treasure Valley Community College	Chukars	Ontario	Oregon	
Utah State University Eastern	Eagles	Price	Utah	
Wenatchee Valley College	Knights	Wenatchee	Washington	
Yakima Valley College	Yaks	Yakima	Washington	1963

== Schools without athletics ==
School	City	State	Last Year
Athens State University	Athens	Alabama	1949
Atlantic University	Virginia Beach	Virginia	1930
University of Baltimore	Baltimore	Maryland	1935
Brigham Young University–Idaho	Rexburg	Idaho	2001
Champlain College	Burlington	Vermont	1953
Cheyney University of Pennsylvania (Note: Cheyney still field varsity teams in some sports but they compete as Independent without any affiliation.)	Cheyney	Pennsylvania	2017
Cooper Union	New York City	New York	1933
Knoxville College	Knoxville	Tennessee	1997
Morris Brown College	Atlanta	Georgia	2003
New York Institute of Technology	New York City	New York	1983
Northeastern Illinois University	Chicago	Illinois	1988
Midlands Technical College (Note: Was known as South Carolina Trade when its football program was discontinued in 1966.)	Columbia	South Carolina	1966
Quantico Marines	Quantico	Virginia	1972
Polytechnic University of New York (Note: Polytechnic is now the engineering school of New York University, and was known informally as "NYU Poly". The NYU Poly athletic program merged into that of NYU effective with the 2014–15 school year.)	New York City	New York	1902
Reed College	Portland	Oregon	1952
St. Francis College	Brooklyn	New York	1935
Selma University	Selma	Alabama	1940
U.S. International University (Note: Now known as Alliant International University.)	San Diego	California	1980

== Closed or merged schools ==
School	City	State	Last Year	Status
Alabama Presbyterian College	Anniston	Alabama	1917	Closed in 1918
Alderson Broaddus University	Philippi	West Virginia	2022	Closed in 2023
Alliance College	Cambridge Springs	Pennsylvania	1949	Closed in 1987
Anna Maria College	Paxton	Massachusetts	2025	Closed in 2026
Arnold College	New Haven	Connecticut	1953	Closed in 1953 (Note: Merged with the University of Bridgeport.)
Becker College	Worcester	Massachusetts	2020	Closed in 2021
Birmingham–Southern College	Birmingham	Alabama	2023	Closed in 2024
Bishop College	Dallas	Texas	1986	Closed in 1988 (Note: Absorbed by Paul Quinn College.)
Boston State College	Boston	Massachusetts	1974	Closed in 1982 (Note: Absorbed into the University of Massachusetts Boston.)
Broaddus College	Philippi	West Virginia	1921	Closed in 1932 (Note: Merged into Alderson Broaddus University. Alderson Broaddus later reinstated football in Division II in 2013 and added a sprint football team in 2019 before closing in 2023.)
Canterbury College (Indiana)	Danville	Indiana	1950	Closed in 1951
Carlisle Indian Industrial School	Carlisle	Pennsylvania	1917	Closed in 1918
Cincinnati Christian University	Cincinnati	Ohio	2019	Closed in 2019
Clarke Memorial College	Newton	Mississippi	1933	Closed in 1992 (Note: Absorbed into Mississippi College, now known as Mississippi Christian University.)
Clarks Summit University	Clarks Summit	Pennsylvania	2024	Closed in 2024
Concordia College Alabama	Selma	Alabama	2015	Closed in 2018
Dana College	Blair	Nebraska	2009	Closed in 2010
Daniel Baker College	Brownwood	Texas	1951	Closed in 1952 (Note: Absorbed into Howard Payne University.)
Detroit Institute of Technology	Detroit	Michigan	1951	Closed in 1981
College of Emporia	Emporia	Kansas	1972	Closed in 1974
Federal City College	Washington	District of Columbia	1974	Closed in 1974 (Note: Merged with the District of Columbia Teachers College and the Washington Technical Institute to form the University of the District of Columbia.)
Finlandia University	Hancock	Michigan	2022	Closed in 2023
Fort Lauderdale College (Note: Later known as Florida Metropolitan University and then became part of Everest University system.)	Fort Lauderdale	Florida	1981	Closed in 2015
Frederick College	Portsmouth	Virginia	1967	Closed in 1968 (Note: Campus absorbed by Tidewater Community College.)
Hiram Scott College	Scottsbluff	Nebraska	1970	Closed in 1970
Iowa Wesleyan University	Mount Pleasant	Iowa	2022	Closed in 2023
Lambuth University	Jackson	Tennessee	2010	Closed in 2011
Leland College	Baker	Louisiana	1959	Closed in 1960
Lindenwood University – Belleville	Belleville	Illinois	2018	Closed in 2020
Long Island University Post	Brookville	New York	2018	Closed in 2019 (Note: The LIU Post athletic program merged with the program of LIU Brooklyn, which did not sponsor football, in 2019. The Post football team now competes as the LIU Sharks.)
MacMurray College	Jacksonville	Illinois	2019	Closed in 2020
Middle Georgia College	Cochran	Georgia	1961	Closed in 2013 (Note: Merged with Macon State College to become Middle Georgia State University.)
Milton College	Milton	Wisconsin	1981	Closed in 1982
Mississippi Industrial College	Holly Springs	Mississippi	1964	Closed in 1982
Morthland College	West Frankfort	Illinois	2016	Closed in 2018
Mount Ida College	Newton	Massachusetts	2017	Closed in 2018 (Note: Now the Mount Ida Campus of UMass Amherst.)
Nebraska Central College	Central City	Nebraska	1951	Closed in 1953
New Bedford Textile (Note: Later known as the New Bedford Institute of Technology and the Southeastern Massachusetts Technological Institute before being merged into the University of Massachusetts Dartmouth.)	Dartmouth	Massachusetts	1950	Closed in 1964
Norman College	Norman Park	Georgia	1940	Closed in 1971
University of North Dakota–Ellendale	Ellendale	North Dakota	1971	Closed in 1971
Northland College	Ashland	Wisconsin	1975	Closed in 2025
Notre Dame College	South Euclid	Ohio	2023	Closed in 2024
Panzer College	Montclair	New Jersey	1950	Closed in 1958 (Note: Merged into Montclair State University.)
Parsons College	Fairfield	Iowa	1970	Closed in 1973
Phillips University	Enid	Oklahoma	1933	Closed in 1998
Pillsbury Baptist Bible College	Owatonna	Minnesota	1988	Closed in 2008
Presentation College	Aberdeen	South Dakota	2022	Closed in 2023
Robert Morris University Illinois	Chicago	Illinois	2019	Closed in 2020 (Note: Integrated into neighboring Roosevelt University.)
Saint Joseph's College	Rensselaer	Indiana	2016	Closed in 2017
St. Mary of the Plains College	Dodge City	Kansas	1991	Closed in 1992
Saint Michael's College (Note: Later known as Santa Fe University of Art and Design.)	Santa Fe	New Mexico	1950	Closed in 2018
Saint Paul's College	Lawrenceville	Virginia	2010	Closed in 2013
Samuel Huston College	Austin	Texas	1951	Closed in 1952 (Note: Merged into Huston–Tillotson University.)
Shaw College at Detroit	Detroit	Michigan	1951	Closed in 1983
Shurtleff College	Alton	Illinois	1950	Closed in 1957
Si Tanka-Huron University	Huron	South Dakota	2004	Closed in 2005
University of South Dakota - Springfield	Springfield	South Dakota	1982	Closed in 1984
Southern Idaho College of Education	Albion	Idaho	1950	Closed in 1951
Sue Bennett College	London	Kentucky	1997	Closed in 1997 (Note: Absorbed into Union College (KY), now known as Union Commonwealth University.)
Tarkio College	Tarkio	Missouri	1990	Closed in 1992
Tillotson College	Austin	Texas	1950	Closed in 1952
Trinity International University	Deerfield	Illinois	2022	Closed in 2023 (Note: Closed its residential campus in 2023, but still offers online undergraduate programs.)
Upsala College	East Orange	New Jersey	1993	Closed in 1995
Urbana University	Urbana	Ohio	2019	Closed in 2020
Wesley College (Delaware)	Dover	Delaware	2020	Closed in 2020 (Note: Absorbed into Delaware State University.)
Western Reserve University	Hudson	Ohio	1967	Closed in 1967 (Note: Merged with Case Institute of Technology to form Case Western Reserve University.)
Westmar University	Le Mars	Iowa	1997	Closed in 1997
University of Wisconsin–Extension	Milwaukee	Wisconsin	1955	Closed in 1955 (Note: Merged with Wisconsin State College of Milwaukee to form the current University of Wisconsin–Milwaukee.)
Yankton College	Yankton	South Dakota	1983	Closed in 1984

== International schools ==
Canada

- University College of Cape Breton (1990)
- Dalhousie University (1976)
- Laurentian University (1971)
- Loyola College (Montreal) (1974), merged with Sir George Williams University to become Concordia University
- Macdonald College, merged with McGill University (1973)
- University of New Brunswick (1980)
- University of Prince Edward Island (1979)
- Université du Québec à Montréal (1972)
- Université du Québec à Trois-Rivières (1979)
- Royal Military College of Canada (1972)
- St. Patrick's College, merged with Carleton University (1966)
- Sir George Williams University (1972)

Cuba

- University of Havana (c. 1958)

Guam

- University of Guam (c. 1981)

Mexico

- Borregos Salvajes ITESM Torreón (2004)
- Cóndores UNAM (1997)
- Heroico Colegio Militar (c. 1952)
- Lobos Universidad Autónoma de Coahuila (unknown)
- Mexico City College (c. 1954)
- Pieles Rojas ESIQIE-IPN (1998)

United Kingdom

- Aberdeen Steamroller
- Aston Rhinos
- Cambridge Pythons
- Dundee Bluedevils
- Eton (1873)
- Manchester MPs
- Strathclyde Hawks

== See also ==
- List of defunct college basketball teams
- List of defunct men's college ice hockey teams
- List of NCAA institutions with club football teams
- List of NCAA Division I non-football programs
- List of NCAA Division I institutions
- List of NCAA Division II institutions
- List of NCAA Division III institutions
